= Civil parishes in South Yorkshire =

Local government divisions of South Yorkshire, England

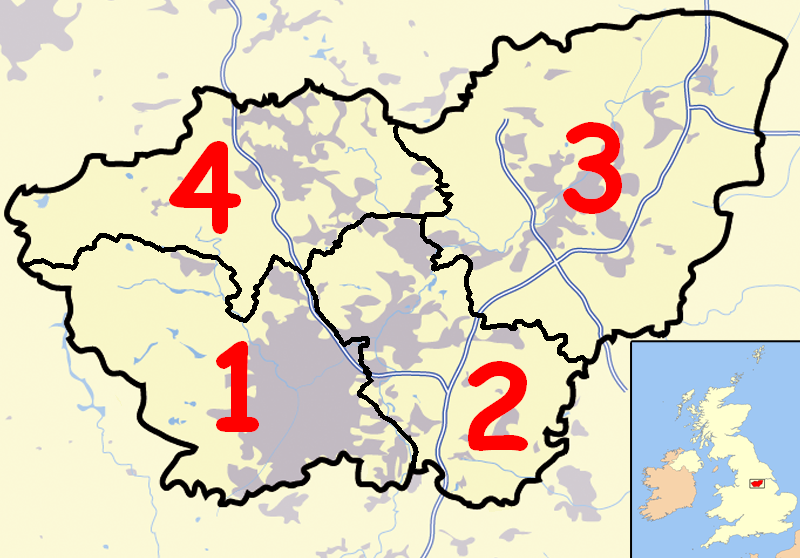
A map of South Yorkshire, showing the Metropolitan Boroughs: (1) Sheffield; (2) Rotherham; (3) Doncaster; and (4) Barnsley.

A civil parish is a country subdivision, forming the lowest unit of local government in England. There are 94 civil parishes in the ceremonial county of South Yorkshire, most of the county being unparished. At the 2001 census, there were 360,191 people living in the parishes, increasing to 369,220 in 2011, accounting for 27.5 per cent of the county's population.

== History ==
Parishes arose from Church of England divisions, and were originally purely ecclesiastical divisions. Over time they acquired civil administration powers.

The Highways Act 1555 made parishes responsible for the upkeep of roads. Every adult inhabitant of the parish was obliged to work four days a year on the roads, providing their own tools, carts and horses; the work was overseen by an unpaid local appointee, the Surveyor of Highways.

The poor were looked after by the monasteries, until their dissolution. In 1572, magistrates were given power to 'survey the poor' and impose taxes for their relief. This system was made more formal by the Poor Law Act 1601, which made parishes responsible for administering the Poor Law; overseers were appointed to charge a rate to support the poor of the parish. The 19th century saw an increase in the responsibility of parishes, although the Poor Law powers were transferred to Poor Law Unions. The Public Health Act 1872 grouped parishes into Rural Sanitary Districts, based on the Poor Law Unions; these subsequently formed the basis for Rural Districts.

Parishes were run by vestries, meeting annually to appoint officials, and were generally identical to ecclesiastical parishes, although some townships in large parishes administered the Poor Law themselves; under the Divided Parishes and Poor Law Amendment Act 1882, all extra-parochial areas and townships that levied a separate rate became independent civil parishes.

Civil parishes in their modern sense date from the Local Government Act 1894, which abolished vestries; established elected parish councils in all rural parishes with more than 300 electors; grouped rural parishes into Rural Districts; and aligned parish boundaries with county and borough boundaries. Urban civil parishes continued to exist, and were generally coterminous with the Urban District, Municipal Borough or County Borough in which they were situated; many large towns contained a number of parishes, and these were usually merged into one. Parish councils were not formed in urban areas, and the only function of the parish was to elect guardians to Poor Law Unions; with the abolition of the Poor Law system in 1930 the parishes had only a nominal existence.

The Local Government Act 1972 retained civil parishes in rural areas, and many former Urban Districts and Municipal Boroughs that were being abolished, were replaced by new successor parishes; urban areas that were considered too large to be single parishes became unparished areas.

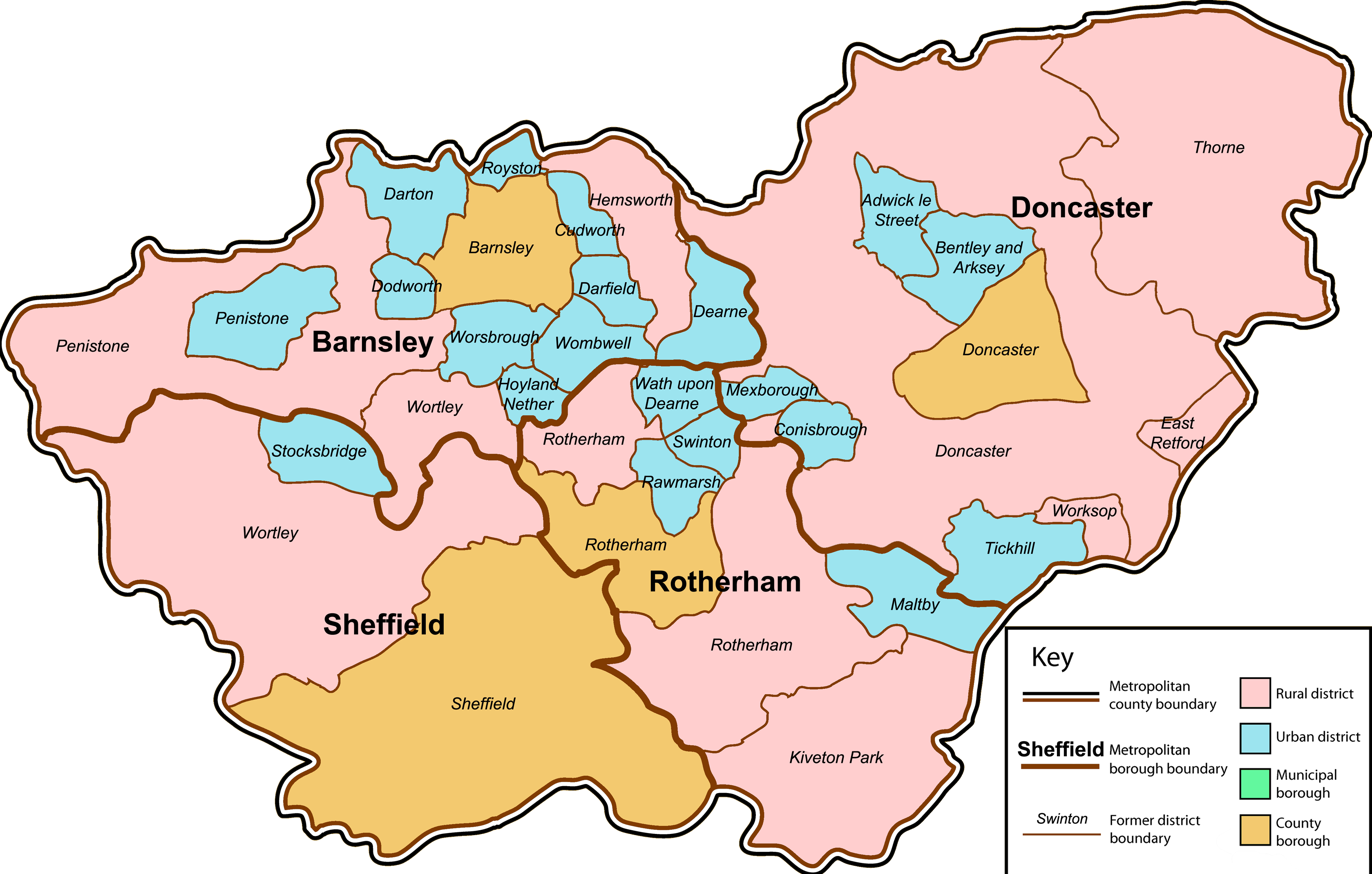
South Yorkshire showing the former local authorities

== The current position ==
Recent governments have encouraged the formation of town and parish councils in unparished areas, and the Local Government and Rating Act 1997 gave local residents the right to demand the creation of a new civil parish.

A parish council can become a town council unilaterally, simply by resolution; and a civil parish can also gain city status, but only if that is granted by the Crown. The chairman of a town or city council is called a mayor. The Local Government and Public Involvement in Health Act 2007 introduced alternative names: a parish council can now choose to be called a community; village; or neighbourhood council.

Civil parishes with town status

== List of civil parishes and unparished areas ==
Image	Name	Status	Population	District	Former local authority	Refs
	Barnsley	Unparished area	91,297	Barnsley	Barnsley; County Borough	
	Billingley	Civil parish	210	Barnsley	Hemsworth; Rural District	
	Brierley	Unparished area	7,267	Barnsley	Hemsworth; Rural District	
	Cawthorne	Civil parish	1,151	Barnsley	Penistone; Rural District	
	Cudworth	Unparished area	10,977	Barnsley	Cudworth; Urban District	
	Darfield	Unparished area	10,685	Barnsley	Darfield; Urban District	
	Darton	Unparished area	21,345	Barnsley	Darton; Urban District	
	Dearne	Unparished area	22,387	Barnsley	Dearne; Urban District	
	Dodworth	Unparished area	9,777	Barnsley	Dodworth; Urban District	
	Dunford	Civil parish	568	Barnsley	Penistone; Rural District	
	Great Houghton	Civil parish	2,475	Barnsley	Hemsworth; Rural District	
	Gunthwaite and Ingbirchworth	Civil parish	460	Barnsley	Penistone; Rural District	
	High Hoyland	Civil parish	128	Barnsley	Penistone; Rural District	
	Hoyland Nether	Unparished area	17,710	Barnsley	Hoyland Nether; Urban District	
	Hunshelf	Civil parish	346	Barnsley	Penistone; Rural District	
	Langsett	Civil parish	222	Barnsley	Penistone; Rural District	
	Little Houghton	Civil parish	659	Barnsley	Hemsworth; Rural District	
	Oxspring	Civil parish	1,225	Barnsley	Penistone; Rural District	
	Penistone	Town	11,270	Barnsley	Penistone; Urban District	
	Royston	Unparished area	10,728	Barnsley	Royston; Urban District	
	Shafton	Civil parish	3,447	Barnsley	Hemsworth; Rural District	
	Silkstone	Civil parish	3,153	Barnsley	Penistone; Rural District	
	Stainborough	Civil parish	390	Barnsley	Penistone; Rural District	
	Tankersley	Civil parish	1,671	Barnsley	Wortley; Rural District	
	Thurgoland	Civil parish	1,969	Barnsley	Penistone; Rural District	
	Wombwell	Unparished area	11,477	Barnsley	Wombwell; Urban District	
	Worsbrough	Unparished area	9,682	Barnsley	Worsbrough; Urban District	
	Wortley	Civil parish	626	Barnsley	Wortley; Rural District	
	Adwick le Street	Unparished area	19,222	Doncaster	Adwick le Street; Urban District	
	Adwick upon Dearne	Civil parish	333	Doncaster	Doncaster; Rural District	
	Armthorpe	Civil parish	14,457	Doncaster	Doncaster; Rural District	
	Askern	Town	5,570	Doncaster	Doncaster; Rural District	
	Auckley	Civil parish	3,745	Doncaster	Doncaster; Rural District	
	Austerfield	Civil parish	536	Doncaster	Doncaster; Rural District	
	Barnburgh	Civil parish	1,924	Doncaster	Doncaster; Rural District	
	Barnby Dun with Kirk Sandall	Civil parish	8,592	Doncaster	Doncaster; Rural District	
	Bawtry	Town	3,573	Doncaster	Doncaster; Rural District	
	Bentley with Arksey	Unparished area	14,191	Doncaster	Bentley with Arksey; Urban District	
	Blaxton	Civil parish	1,162	Doncaster	Doncaster; Rural District	
	Braithwell	Civil parish	1,060	Doncaster	Doncaster; Rural District	
	Brodsworth	Civil parish	2,936	Doncaster	Doncaster; Rural District	
	Burghwallis	Civil parish	300	Doncaster	Doncaster; Rural District	
	Cadeby	Civil parish	203	Doncaster	Doncaster; Rural District	
	Cantley	Civil parish	2,817	Doncaster	Doncaster; Rural District	
	Clayton with Frickley	Civil parish	230	Doncaster	Doncaster; Rural District	
	Conisbrough	Unparished area	15,934	Doncaster	Conisbrough; Urban District	
	Conisbrough Parks	Civil parish	374	Doncaster	Doncaster; Rural District	
	Denaby	Civil parish	329	Doncaster	Doncaster; Rural District	
	Doncaster	Unparished area	109,805	Doncaster	Doncaster; County Borough	
	Edenthorpe	Civil parish	4,776	Doncaster	Doncaster; Rural District	
	Edlington	Town	7,856	Doncaster	Doncaster; Rural District	
	Fenwick	Civil parish	121	Doncaster	Doncaster; Rural District	
	Finningley	Civil parish	1,497	Doncaster	East Retford; Rural District	
	Fishlake	Civil parish	682	Doncaster	Thorne; Rural District	
	Hampole	Civil parish	203	Doncaster	Doncaster; Rural District	
	Hatfield	Town	17,326	Doncaster	Thorne; Rural District	
	Hickleton	Civil parish	274	Doncaster	Doncaster; Rural District	
	High Melton	Civil parish	300	Doncaster	Doncaster; Rural District	
	Hooton Pagnell	Civil parish	201	Doncaster	Doncaster; Rural District	
	Kirk Bramwith	Civil parish	320	Doncaster	Doncaster; Rural District	
	Loversall	Civil parish	156	Doncaster	Doncaster; Rural District	
	Marr	Civil parish	146	Doncaster	Doncaster; Rural District	
	Mexborough	Unparished area	15,244	Doncaster	Mexborough; Urban District	
	Moss	Civil parish	389	Doncaster	Doncaster; Rural District	
	Norton	Civil parish	4,625	Doncaster	Doncaster; Rural District	
	Owston	Civil parish	145	Doncaster	Doncaster; Rural District	
	Rossington	Civil parish	13,537	Doncaster	Doncaster; Rural District	
	Sprotbrough and Cusworth	Civil parish	12,134	Doncaster	Doncaster; Rural District	
	Stainforth	Town	6,282	Doncaster	Thorne; Rural District	
	Stainton	Civil parish	271	Doncaster	Doncaster; Rural District	
	Sykehouse	Civil parish	515	Doncaster	Thorne; Rural District	
	Thorne	Town	17,295	Doncaster	Thorne; Rural District	
	Thorpe in Balne	Civil parish	203	Doncaster	Doncaster; Rural District	
	Tickhill	Town	5,228	Doncaster	Tickhill; Urban District	
	Wadworth	Civil parish	1,137	Doncaster	Doncaster; Rural District	
	Warmsworth	Civil parish	1,753	Doncaster	Doncaster; Rural District	
	Aston cum Aughton	Civil parish	15,134	Rotherham	Rotherham; Rural District	
	Bramley	Civil parish	7,491	Rotherham	Rotherham; Rural District	
	Brampton Bierlow	Civil parish	4,610	Rotherham	Rotherham; Rural District	
	Brinsworth	Civil parish	8,789	Rotherham	Rotherham; Rural District	
	Catcliffe	Civil parish	2,108 (including part of Waverley	Rotherham	Rotherham; Rural District	
	Dalton	Civil parish	10,292	Rotherham	Rotherham; Rural District	
	Dinnington St John's	Town	9,077	Rotherham	Kiveton Park; Rural District	
	Firbeck	Civil parish	299	Rotherham	Kiveton Park; Rural District	
	Gildingwells	Civil parish	226 (including Letwell)	Rotherham	Kiveton Park; Rural District	
	Harthill with Woodall	Civil parish	1,879	Rotherham	Kiveton Park; Rural District	
	Hellaby	Civil parish	825	Rotherham	Rotherham; Rural District	
	Hooton Levitt	Civil parish	132	Rotherham	Rotherham; Rural District	
	Hooton Roberts	Civil parish	210	Rotherham	Rotherham; Rural District	
	Laughton-en-le-Morthen	Civil parish	1,241	Rotherham	Rotherham; Rural District	
	Letwell	Civil parish		Rotherham	Kiveton Park; Rural District	
	Maltby	Town	16,856	Rotherham	Maltby; Urban District	
	North and South Anston	Civil parish	9,217	Rotherham	Kiveton Park; Rural District	
	Orgreave	Civil parish	739 (including part of Waverley)	Rotherham	Rotherham; Rural District	
	Ravenfield	Civil parish	2,828	Rotherham	Rotherham; Rural District	
	Rawmarsh	Unparished area	18,498	Rotherham	Rawmarsh; Urban District	
	Rotherham	Unparished area	109,691	Rotherham	Rotherham; County Borough	
	Swinton	Unparished area	11,701	Rotherham	Swinton; Urban District	
	Thorpe Salvin	Civil parish	476	Rotherham	Kiveton Park; Rural District	
	Thrybergh	Civil parish	4,058	Rotherham	Rotherham; Rural District	
	Thurcroft	Civil parish	6,900	Rotherham	Rotherham; Rural District	
	Todwick	Civil parish	1,634	Rotherham	Kiveton Park; Rural District	
	Treeton	Civil parish	3,189	Rotherham	Rotherham; Rural District	
	Ulley	Civil parish	172	Rotherham	Rotherham; Rural District	
	Wales	Civil parish	7,069	Rotherham	Kiveton Park; Rural District	
	Wath upon Dearne	Unparished area	11,816	Rotherham	Wath upon Dearne; Urban District	
	Waverley	Civil parish	created post census	Rotherham	Rotherham; Rural District	
	Wentworth	Civil parish	1,478	Rotherham	Rotherham; Rural District	
	Whiston	Civil parish	5,042	Rotherham	Rotherham; Rural District	
	Wickersley	Civil parish	7,392	Rotherham	Rotherham; Rural District	
	Woodsetts	Civil parish	1,746	Rotherham	Kiveton Park; Rural District	
	Bradfield	Civil parish	17,100	Sheffield	Wortley; Rural District	
	Ecclesfield	Civil parish	32,073	Sheffield	Wortley; Rural District	
	Sheffield	Unparished area	518,090	Sheffield	Sheffield; County Borough	
	Stocksbridge	Town	13,455	Sheffield	Stocksbridge; Urban District	

== See also ==
- List of civil parishes in England
