= List of settlements in South Yorkshire by population =

The 25 largest settlements of the county of South Yorkshire, with district centres in yellow, and key towns and areas shown in white.

This is a list of settlements in South Yorkshire by population based on the results of the 2011 census. The next United Kingdom census will take place in 2021. In 2011, there were 34 built-up area subdivisions with 5,000 or more inhabitants in South Yorkshire, shown in the table below.

== Administrative boundaries ==
Table taken from the South Yorkshire - Geography subsection:

Metropolitan borough		Centre of Governing	Other places in borough
1	City of Sheffield	Sheffield City Centre	Beighton, Chapeltown, Mosborough, Oughtibridge, Stocksbridge, Wharncliffe Side
2	Rotherham (borough)	Rotherham (town)	Anston, Aughton, Bolton-upon-Dearne, Brinsworth, Dinnington, Harthill, Kiveton Park, Maltby, Rawmarsh, Scholes, Swinton, Thorpe Hesley, Todwick, Treeton, Thurcroft, Wales, Wath-upon-Dearne, Woodsetts, Whiston
3	Doncaster (borough)	Doncaster (city)	Adwick le Street, Armthorpe, Askern, Auckley, Balby, Barnby Dun, Bawtry, Bentley, Bessacarr, Braithwell, Branton, Cantley, Carcroft, Conisbrough, Cusworth, Denaby, Dunscroft, Dunsville, Edenthorpe, Edlington, Finningley, Fishlake, Hatfield, Hyde Park, Intake, Kirk Sandall, Loversall, Marr, Mexborough, Micklebring, Moorends, Scawsby, Scawthorpe, Skellow, Stainforth, Rossington, Sykehouse, Norton, Thorne, Tickhill, Wadworth, Wheatley, Wheatley Hills
4	Barnsley (borough)	Barnsley (town)	Billingley, Birdwell, Cudworth, Darfield, Darton, Dodworth, Great Houghton, Grimethorpe, Hoyland Nether, Royston, Penistone, Thurnscoe, Wombwell, Worsbrough

== Population ranking ==
#	Places	Population			Outlying areas
#	Places	2001	2011	2021	Outlying areas
1	Sheffield	479,460	518,090	525,142	Excludes Butterthwaite, Catcliffe, Oughtibridge, Ringinglow, Stopes, Storrs, Thorpe Hesley, Treeton, Whitley, Worrall (Note: Small areas of North East Derbyshire also counted within Sheffield due to the built-up area extending to these locations - Bradway Grange to the north of Dronfield Woodhouse, Danes Balk/Windmill Hill north of Eckington, minor residential areas in Highlane and Ridgeway.)
2	Doncaster	101,940	109,805	113,566	Excludes Barnby Dun, Bentley, Branton, Loversall, Old Cantley, Old Edlington, Sprotbrough
3	Rotherham	105,720	109,691	109,697	Excludes Hellaby
4	Barnsley	87,460	91,297	96,888	Cudworth, Dodworth, Royston, Wombwell, Worsbrough counted separately.
5	Wath-upon-Dearne	31,730	33,427	37,103	Includes Bow Broom, Brampton, Kilnhurst, Newhill, Swinton, West Melton
6	Bentley	26,573	27,145	27,040	Includes Arksey, Cusworth, Scawthorpe, Stockbridge
7	Wombwell	21,560	23,355	25,520	Includes Darfield, Hemingfield. Excludes Smithley
8	Chapeltown	23,080	23,056	22,543	Includes Burncross, Charltonbrook, High Green, Mortomley, Warren
9	Dinnington	19,090	19,860	20,345	Includes Laughton Common, North Anston, South Anston, Throapham
10	Rawmarsh	18,210	18,498	18,908	Includes Parkgate, Ryecroft, Upper Haugh
11	Adwick-le-Street	18,656	19,222	18,693	Includes Carcroft, Highfields, Skellow, Woodlands
12	Hoyland	16,567	17,710	17,951	Includes Blacker Hill, Elsecar, Jump, Milton. Excludes Birdwell
13	Maltby	17,094	16,688	16,316	Includes Wood Lee. Excludes Braithwell, Hellaby, Hooton Leevit
14	Mexborough	14,750	15,244	15,855	Includes Dolcliffe Common, Highwoods, Roman Terrace, Windhill. Excludes Adwick-upon-Dearne
15	Conisbrough	15,360	15,934	15,773	Includes Denaby Main, Windgate Hill. Excludes Clifton Common, Conisbrough Common, Hill Top, Old Denaby
16	Swallownest	13,860	15,022	14,517	Includes Aston, Aughton, Netherthorpe. Excludes Beighton, Treeton, Ulley, Woodhouse
17	Armthorpe	12,630	14,457	14,163	Includes Nutwell. Excludes Cantley, Edenthorpe, Wheatley Hills
18	Dunscroft/ Hatfield	13,890	14,326	13,993	Includes Dunsville, Hatfield Woodhouse
19	New Rossington	13,260	13,537	13,920	Includes Littleworth
20	Stocksbridge	13,316	13,069	12,911	Includes Deepcar. Excludes Bolsterstone, Midhopestone, Waldershaigh
21	Cudworth	11,644	12,635	12,791	Includes Shafton. Excludes Brierley, Grimethorpe, North Field Laith, West Green
22	Thorne	11,387	11,840	12,295	Includes Canal Side. Moorends, Hatfield, Stainsforth counted separately. Excludes Fishlake, Waterside
23	Royston	9,375	10,069	10,757	Excludes Carlton, Notton
24	Penistone	8,940	9,817	10,730	Includes Broad Hill, Bridge End, Cubley, Oxspring, Scout Bridge, Spring Vale, Thurlstone, Water Hall. Excludes Millhouse Green, Scout Dike, Hill Side
25	Thurnscoe	9,122	8,687	9,517	Excludes Clayton, Goldthorpe, Great Houghton, Hickleton, Stotfold
26	Worsbrough	9,158	9,119	9,157	Includes Lewden Hill. Ward Green. Excludes Kendray, Lower Lewden, Oustlethwaite, Swaithe, Worsbrough Common
27	Kiveton Park	6,460	7,069	7,510	Includes Wales. Excludes Kiveton Bridge, Harthill, Todwick, Woodall
28	Bolton-upon-Dearne	6,530	6,744	6,826	Excludes Goldthorpe
29	Stainforth	6,342	6,282	6,380	Excludes Hatfield, Far Bank and Fishlake
30	Goldthorpe	5,958	6,051	6,367	Includes Highgate. Excludes Barnburgh and Harlington
31	Thurcroft	4,702	5,115	6,101	Excludes Brampton-en-le-Morthen, Morthen, Springvale
32	Askern	5,434	5,570	6,094	Includes Instoneville
33	Dodworth	5,742	5,900	5,977	Includes Gilroyd
34	Moorends	5,205	5,455	5,801	
34	Finningley	3,206	3,525	5,305	Excludes Blaxton, Auckley
35	Grimethorpe	3,740	4,672	5,068	
36	Tickhill	5,112	4,992	4,913	

== See also ==
- South Yorkshire (County)
- Sheffield urban area
