= Frenchgate Interchange =

Transport interchange in Doncaster, South Yorkshire, England

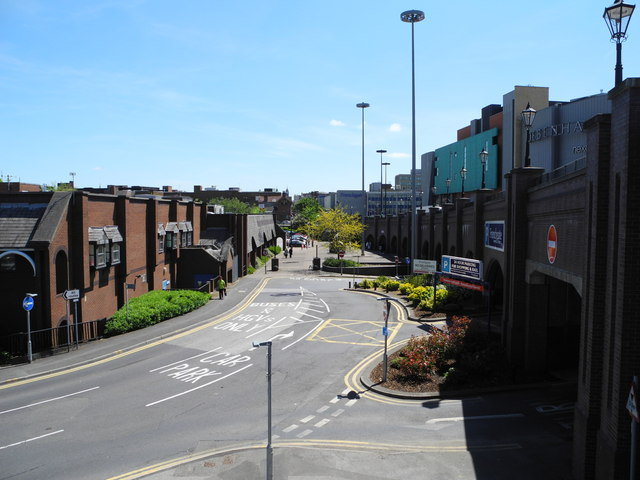
- Northern bus access to the Frenchgate Interchange beneath the North Bridge

General information
- Other names: Doncaster Interchange
- Location: Frenchgate Shopping Centre, St Sepulchre Gate, Doncaster; South Yorkshire; United Kingdom
- Coordinates: 53.5240°N 1.1388°W
- System: Transport interchange
- Owner: South Yorkshire Passenger Transport Executive
- Operator: Travel South Yorkshire
- Bus stands: 30
- Bus operators: David Goodfellows Travel Yorkshire, First South Yorkshire, Isle Coaches, National Express, Powell's Bus, Stagecoach Yorkshire & East Midlands, Stagecoach Yorkshire, David Goodfellow Coaches
- Connections: Doncaster railway station

Construction
- Parking: Yes
- Cycle facilities: Yes
- Accessible: Yes

History
- Opened: June 2006
Location

The Frenchgate Interchange (also known as Doncaster Interchange) is a rail and bus transport interchange located within the Frenchgate Shopping Centre in the city centre of Doncaster, South Yorkshire, England. It has 30 bus stands, with a large number of destinations accessible from Doncaster railway station.

== History ==
Frenchgate Interchange was designed by local transport executive South Yorkshire Passenger Transport Executive (SYPTE) and shopping centre owners Teesland. It had received planning permission by 2001, and was intended to open in 2004 at a cost of £70 million.

Work began in 2003. It opened in June 2006 and became the city's main transport hub, with SYPTE predicting that it would receive around 12 million passengers per year. The previous Doncaster North and Doncaster South bus stations, which dated from the 1960s and were located underneath multi-storey car parks, were closed. However, the South Bus Station remained a multi storey car park and has recently become the main car park for the developing civic area.

== Services ==
As of February 2021, the stand allocation is:

Stand	Route	Destination
A1	55, 56	Rossington via Belle Vue, Bessacarr and Lakeside (First)
A2	22	Worksop via Balby, Wadworth, Tickhill, Oldcotes, Langold, Costhorpe and Carlton-in-Lindrick (Stagecoach EM)
A2	205	Tickhill via Balby, Rossington and Harworth (First)
A2	i4	iPort via Lakeside (First)
A3	57a, 58a	Doncaster Sheffield Airport via Bessacarr, Parrots Corner, Auckley, Cantley, Blaxton and Finningley (First)
A4	57c, 57f, 58c, 58f	Doncaster Sheffield Airport via Finningley, Blaxton, Cantley, Auckley, Parrots Corner and Bessacarr (First)
A5	65, 66	Wheatley Hills via Town Moor and Intake (First)
A6	52	South Elmsall via Scawthorpe, Highfields, Woodlands and North Elmsall (First)
A6	405	Selby via Bentley, Askern, Campsall, Norton, Whitley, Hut Green and Eggborough (Arriva)
A6	408, 409, 412	Pontefract via Bentley, Toll Bar, Sutton, Askern, Campsall, Carcroft, Norton and Darrington (Arriva & First)
A7	66	Bentley via Scawthorpe (First)
A8	15, 215	Edlington via Balby, Warmsworth and Wadworth (First)
A8	64, 64a	Arksey via Bentley (First)
A9	50, 50a, 50b, 51, 51a	Askern via Highfields, Woodlands, Adwick-le-Street, Carcroft, Skellow, Burghwallis and Instoneville (First)
A10	54	Woodlands via Scawthorpe, Highfields and Adwick-le-Street (First)
A11	41, 41a	Scawsby via Cusworth (First)
A11	X19	Barnsley via Goldthorpe and Darfield (Stagecoach)
A12	49	Sprotbrough via Cusworth (Powell's Bus])
A12	219, 219a	Barnsley via Sprotbrough, Harlington, Barnburgh, Goldthorpe, Thurnscoe, Great Houghton, Darfield and Ardsley (Stagecoach)
B1	–	rail replacement bus services from Doncaster railway station
B2	–	rail replacement bus services from Doncaster railway station
B3	21, 25	Worksop via Bawtry, Bircotes, Harworth, Blyth, Oldcotes, Langold and Carlton-in-Lindrick (Stagecoach EM)
B3	29, 99	Retford via Bawtry, Bircotes, Harworth, Blyth, Ranskill and Barnby Moor (Stagecoach EM)
B3	98	Gainsborough via Bawtry, Everton, Misterton and Walkeringham (Stagecoach EM)
B4	10	Rotherham via Balby, Edlington, Braithwell, Maltby, Bramley, Wickersley, Rotherham General Hospital and Broom Valley (First)
B4	14	Edlington via Balby and Warmsworth (First)
B4	16	Balby via Hexthorpe (First)
B5	18	Hellaby via Edlington and Maltby (Powell's Bus)
B5	X20	Barnsley via Warmsworth, Conisbrough, Mexborough, Manvers, Old Moor and Wombwell (Powell's Bus)
B6	221	Rotherham via Conisbrough, Denaby Main, Mexborough, Swinton and Rawmarsh (Stagecoach)
B7	X3	Sheffield via Balby, Conisbrough, Thrybergh, Rotherham, Templeborough, Meadowhall and Attercliffe (First)
B8	73	Balby via Lakeside and Hexthorpe (First)
B9	71, 72	Lakeside via Balby and Hexthorpe (First)
B10	19	Balby via Hexthorpe (First)
B11	15, 15a, 215	Long Sandall via Wheatley (First)
C1	–	National Express intercity coach services
C2	81, 82	Armthorpe via Wheatley, Doncaster Royal Infirmary and Intake (First)
C3	84, 84a, 84b	Sykehouse via Doncaster Royal Infirmary, Kirk Sandall, Barnby Dun, Kirk Bramwith, Fishlake, Hatfield & Stainforth and Lindholme (First)
C4	87, 87a, 87b	Moorends via Doncaster Royal Infirmary, Edenthorpe, Dunscroft, Hatfield & Stainforth, Hatfield Woodhouse and Thorne (First)
C5	291, 399	Scunthorpe via Cantley, Auckley, Haxey, Owston Ferry and Epworth (Isle Coaches)
C6	–	National Express intercity coach services
C7	203	Wombwell via Scawthorpe, Highfields, Pickburn, Hooton Pagnell, Clayton, Thurnscoe and Middlecliffe (Watersons)
