= Doncaster Rural District =

Former local government area in the UK

Coordinates: 53°31′21″N 1°07′43″W

Doncaster
- Area
  - 1901: 90,373 acres (366 km^{2})
  - 1931: 77,865 acres (315 km^{2})
  - 1961: 75,094 acres (304 km^{2})
- Population
  - 1901: 27,756
  - 1931: 49,047
  - 1961: 66,251
- History
  - Created: 1894
  - Abolished: 1974
  - Succeeded by: Metropolitan Borough of Doncaster
- Status: Rural district
  - HQ: Netherhall, Doncaster

Doncaster was a rural district in the West Riding of Yorkshire, England from 1894 to 1974.

The rural district was created by the Local Government Act 1894 as successor to the Doncaster Rural Sanitary District. It consisted of an area surrounding, but not including, the town of Doncaster. Doncaster itself formed a separate municipal borough (from 1927 a county borough). The district underwent a number of boundary changes over its existence due to the expansion of Doncaster and the growth of a number of other towns.

Doncaster Rural District Council were granted armorial bearings on 30 October 1947.

== Civil parishes ==
Over its existence the rural district consisted of the following civil parishes:

| Parish | Notes |
|---|---|
| Adwick le Street | Constituted an urban district in 1915 |
| Adwick upon Dearne | |
| Armthorpe | |
| Askern | |
| Auckley | Partly in Nottinghamshire until 1895 |
| Austerfield | |
| Balby with Hexthorpe | Constituted an urban district in 1895 |
| Barnbrough | Renamed Barnburgh in 1951 |
| Barnby upon Don | Merged with Kirk Sandall parish 1921 |
| Barnby Dun with Kirk Sandall | Formed 1921 from union of parishes of Barnby upon Don and Kirk Sandall. The area of Edenthorpe was constituted a separate parish in 1956. |
| Bawtry | |
| Bentley with Arksey | Constituted an urban district in 1911 |
| Bilham | Absorbed by Hootton Pagnell parish in 1920 |
| Blaxton | |
| Bolton upon Dearne | Constituted an urban district in 1899 |
| Braithwell | |
| Brodsworth | |
| Burghwallis | |
| Cadeby | |
| Cantley | |
| Carr House and Elm Field | Absorbed by Doncaster MB in 1914 |
| Clayton with Frickley | |
| Conisbrough | Majority of parish constituted an urban district in 1921, remainder became new parish of Conisbrough Parks |
| Conisbrough Parks | Formed 1921 form the part of Conisbrough parish not created an urban district |
| Denaby | |
| Edenthorpe | Created 1956 from part of Barnby Dun with Kirk Sandall parish |
| Edlington | |
| Fenwick | |
| Hampole | |
| Hickleton | |
| Hooton Pagnell | Absorbed Stotfold and Bilham parishes in 1920 |
| Kirk Bramwith | |
| Kirk Sandall | Merged with Barnby upon Don parish to form Barnby Dun with Kirk Sandall in 1921 |
| Loversall | |
| Marr | |
| Melton | |
| Moss | |
| Norton | Absorbed Sutton parish in 1938 |
| Owston | |
| Skellow | Formed part of newly constituted Adwick le Street Urban District in 1915 |
| Rossington | |
| Sprotbrough | |
| Stainton | |
| Stotfold | Absorbed by Hootton Pagnell parish in 1920 |
| Sutton | Absorbed by Norton parish in 1938 |
| Thorpe in Balne | |
| Thurnscoe | Constituted an urban district in 1908 |
| Tickhill Outer | Absorbed by Tickhill Urban District in 1895 |
| Wadworth | |
| Warmsworth | |
| Wheatley | Constituted an urban district in 1900 |

== Abolition ==
On 1 April 1974 the Local Government Act 1972 came into effect, reorganising administrative areas throughout England and Wales. The rural district was abolished, and its area merged with the County Borough of Doncaster and a number of other districts to form the Metropolitan Borough of Doncaster, part of the metropolitan county of South Yorkshire.
