= Conisbrough Urban District =

History of the West Riding of Yorkshire, England

Coordinates: 53.484°N 1.226°W

Conisbrough
- Urban district
- Area
- 1,593 acres (645 ha)
- Population
  - 1911: 15,673
  - 1931: 18,174
  - 1961: 17,594
- History
  - Created: 1 April 1921
  - Abolished: 31 March 1974
  - Succeeded by: Metropolitan Borough of Doncaster
- Contained within
  - County Council: West Riding
- Map of boundary as of 1971

Conisbrough was an urban district in the West Riding of Yorkshire, England, between 1921 and 1974. It encompassed the towns of Conisbrough and Denaby Main. The local authority was Conisbrough Urban District Council.

== History ==
The Urban District was formed on 1 April 1921 by an order of West Riding County Council following a decision taken in March 1920 in response to an application by Conisbrough Parish Council to grant the powers of an urban district to an area constituting the Parish of Conisbrough and parts of the parishes of Denaby Main and Cadeby.

Similar applications had been made by the Conisborough Parish Council in 1898 and again in 1900. On both occasions the County Council made the order following the holding of enquiries, and they were both revoked on appeal to the Local Government Board. Before 1921, the Conisborough and Denaby area was administered by Doncaster Rural District via a parochial committee, a situation in which 900 rural electors returned six members to the RDC and this area with a population of 17,500 returned five.

Conisbrough UD was abolished under the Local Government Act 1972, becoming part of the Metropolitan Borough of Doncaster on 1 April 1974, along with the County Borough of Doncaster, Adwick-le-Street, Bentley with Arksey, Mexborough, and Tickhill urban districts, Doncaster and Thorne rural districts, and parts of East Retford and Worksop rural districts. No successor parish was created for the area.

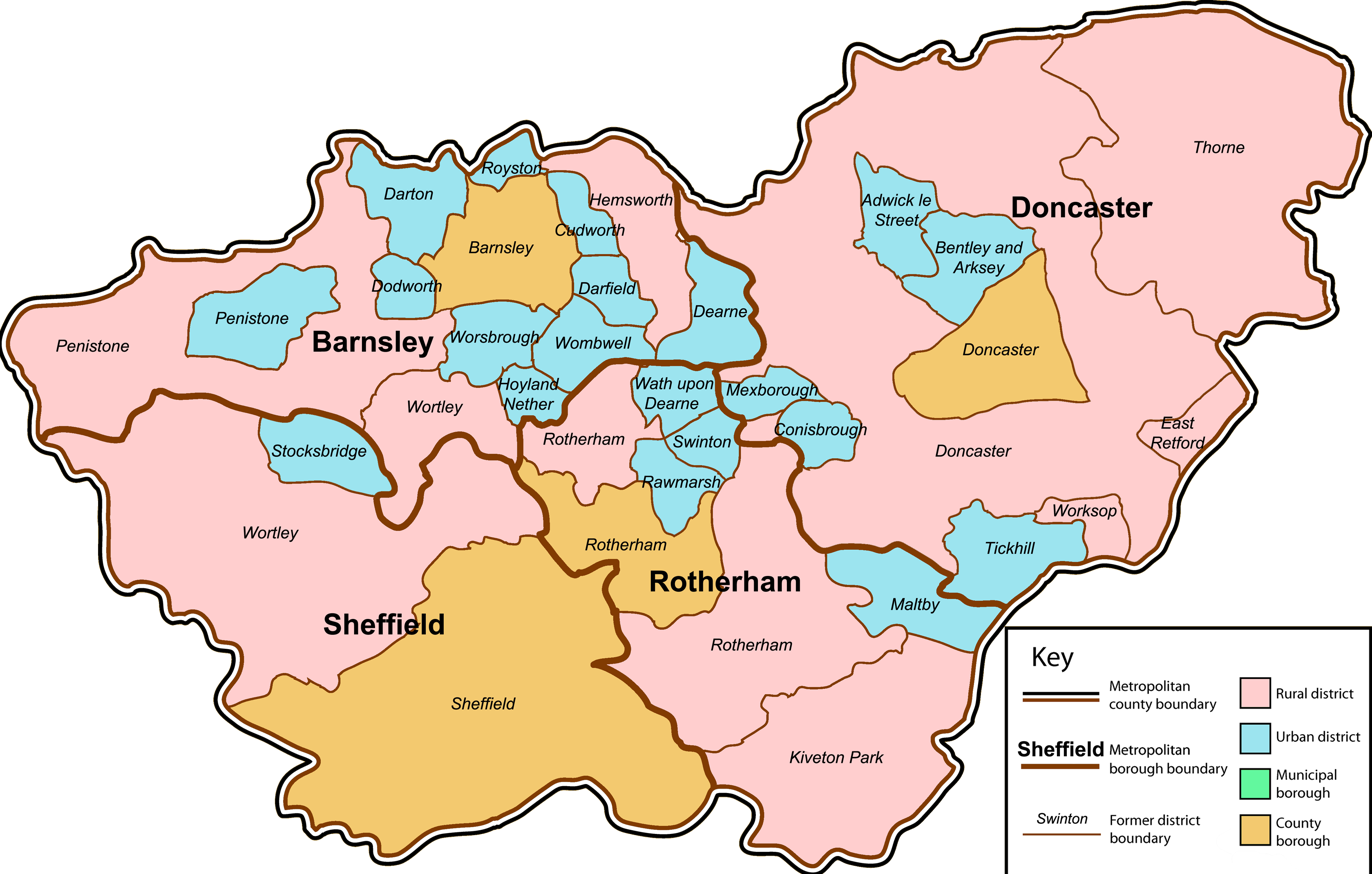
The surrounding pre-1974 districts which now make up South Yorkshire

== Conisbrough Urban District Council ==
Conisbrough Urban District Council held its first meeting on 9 April 1921, electing Mr H C Harrison, a mines manager, as its first chairman. In September 1921, the UDC purchased Albion House on Station Road at a cost of £2,650 to use as municipal premises.
