= Listed buildings in Doncaster =

The listed buildings in Doncaster are included in the following lists, divided by ward:

- Listed buildings in Doncaster (Balby South Ward)
- Listed buildings in Doncaster (Bentley Ward)
- Listed buildings in Doncaster (Bessacarr Ward)
- Listed buildings in Doncaster (Hexthorpe and Balby North Ward)
- Listed buildings in Doncaster (Town Ward)
- Listed buildings in Doncaster (Wheatley Hills and Intake Ward)
