= Wheatley, South Yorkshire =

Suburb of Doncaster, South Yorkshire, England

Coordinates: 53.5371°N 1.1103°W

Wheatley
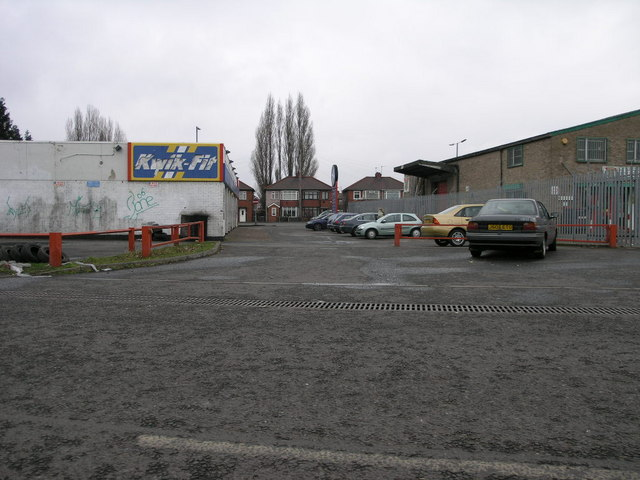

- Location within the Borough of Doncaster Location within South Yorkshire
- Metropolitan borough: Doncaster
- Metropolitan county: South Yorkshire
- Region: Yorkshire and the Humber
- Country: England
- Sovereign state: United Kingdom
- Post town: Doncaster
- Postcode district: DN2
- Dialling code: 01302
- Police: South Yorkshire
- Fire: South Yorkshire
- Ambulance: Yorkshire
- UK Parliament: Doncaster Central

Wheatley is an inner suburb of Doncaster, in South Yorkshire, England.

It lies immediately north-east of the centre of Doncaster, mostly south of the A630 dual carriageway. It is bounded to the north by the River Don, to the east by Wheatley Hills, and to the south by Intake. Until 1974 it was in the West Riding of Yorkshire.

There are numerous new housing and retail developments currently under construction to the north of the A630, opposite the Wheatley Centre shopping park.

== History ==
The name "Wheatley" means 'Wheat wood/clearing'. Wheatley was recorded in the Domesday Book as Watelag/Watelage.

Wheatley was historically a hamlet within the ancient parish of Doncaster, although it was sometimes described as an extra-parochial tract. From 1866 Wheatley was a civil parish in its own right.

When elected parish and district councils were established in 1894, Wheatley was given a parish council and included in the Doncaster Rural District. In 1900 the parish was removed from the rural district to become its own urban district. The parish and urban district were abolished on 9 November 1914 when the area was absorbed into the borough of Doncaster. In 1911 (the last census before the parish was abolished) it had a population of 5,363.
