= Listed buildings in Doncaster (Wheatley Hills and Intake Ward) =

Wheatley Hills and Intake is a ward in the metropolitan borough of Doncaster, South Yorkshire, England. The ward contains three listed buildings that are recorded in the National Heritage List for England. All the listed buildings are designated at Grade II, the lowest of the three grades, which is applied to "buildings of national importance and special interest". The ward contains the suburbs of Wheatley Hills and Intake, to the northeast of the centre of Doncaster. The listed buildings consist of two pairs of semi-detached houses, and a grandstand at Doncaster Racecourse.

== Buildings ==
Name and location	Photograph	Date	Notes
1 and 2 Clay Lane West, Long Sandall; 53.55367°N 1.09050°W		1867	A pair of mirror-image semi-detached houses in red brick with stone dressings and slate roofs. They have two storeys, and two bays each, the centre bays gabled with bargeboards. The doorways are recessed in four-centred arches, and the windows are sashes, some with mullions. At the rear is a gabled bay with a porch in the angle.
3 and 4 Clay Lane West, Long Sandall; 53.55386°N 1.09028°W		1867	A pair of mirror-image semi-detached houses in red brick with stone dressings and slate roofs. They have two storeys, and two bays each, the centre bays gabled with bargeboards. The doorways are recessed in four-centred arches, and the windows are sashes, some with mullions. At the rear is a gabled bay with a porch in the angle.
Second Enclosure, Doncaster Racecourse; 53.52130°N 1.10424°W		1881	The grandstand, which was extended in 1901, is in yellow brick, with stone dressings and a hipped slate roof. There are three storeys, a rectangular plan, and about twelve bays. The ground floor is colonnaded, and surmounted by a balustrade, over which is tiered seating. The roof is carried on iron columns, and on it is a square clock tower with a decorative finial.
