= Stancil, South Yorkshire =

Hamlet in South Yorkshire, England

Coordinates: 53.457°N 9.018°E

Stancil
- Location within South Yorkshire
- Civil parish: Tickhill
- Metropolitan borough: Doncaster
- Metropolitan county: South Yorkshire
- Region: Yorkshire and the Humber
- Country: England
- Sovereign state: United Kingdom
- Post town: DONCASTER
- Postcode district: DN11
- Dialling code: 01302
- Police: South Yorkshire
- Fire: South Yorkshire
- Ambulance: Yorkshire
- UK Parliament: Doncaster Central

Stancil is a rural hamlet in the civil parish of Tickhill, in the Doncaster district, in South Yorkshire, England, south of Doncaster. It is nearby to the similarly rural hamlets of Wellingley and Hesley, as well as north of the village of Tickhill.

The settlement was recorded in the 1086 Domesday Book, under the hundred of Strafforth, with a population of 0. However, a Roman villa had been constructed in the surrounding area, which was excavated in between 1938 and 1939 - suggesting that a small population may had resided in Stancil prior to the collection of the data within the Domesday Book.
