= Listed buildings in Thorpe in Balne =

Thorpe in Balne is a civil parish in the metropolitan borough of Doncaster, South Yorkshire, England. The parish contains three listed buildings that are recorded in the National Heritage List for England. Of these, one is listed at Grade II*, the middle of the three grades, and the others are at Grade II, the lowest grade. The parish contains the village of Thorpe in Balne, and is otherwise rural. The listed buildings consist of the remains of a chapel incorporated in farm buildings, a farmhouse, and a barn.

== Key ==
Grade	Criteria
II*	Particularly important buildings of more than special interest
II	Buildings of national importance and special interest

== Buildings ==
Name and location	Photograph	Date	Notes	Grade
Remains of chapel, Manor House Farm; 53.59294°N 1.09635°W		12th century	The chapel has been altered through the centuries and is now used for other purposes. It is in magnesian limestone on a plinth, with quoins, a chamfered eaves band, and a hipped pantile roof. Only parts of the two-bay chancel remain. On the north side is a Norman doorway that has a lintel with an arched soffit and a plain tympanum, and a semicircular hood mould. In the east side is a blocked Perpendicular window.	II*
Poplar Farmhouse; 53.59098°N 1.10190°W		c. 1700	The house was extended in the 19th century by the addition of a range to the front. The house is pebbledashed with a pantile roof, hipped on the later part, and pitched on the earlier part. The front range has two storeys and four bays, and the earlier part has two storeys and attics. On the front is a doorway with a moulded surround and a fanlight, and the windows are sashes in architraves.	II
Barn southwest of Manor Farmhouse; 53.59875°N 1.09303°W	—	Early to mid 18th century	The barn is in red brick on a stone plinth, with cogged eaves and a pantile roof. There are two storeys, and five or six bays. The openings include doorways, an inserted tractor entry, a casement window, hatches, and triangular vents.	II
