= Listed buildings in Doncaster (Balby South Ward) =

Balby South is a ward in the metropolitan borough of Doncaster, South Yorkshire, England. The ward contains three listed buildings that are recorded in the National Heritage List for England. All the listed buildings are designated at Grade II, the lowest of the three grades, which is applied to "buildings of national importance and special interest". The ward contains part of the suburb of Balby and part of the village of Warmsworth. The listed buildings in the ward consist of a church, and a large house, later a hospital and then offices, and associated structures.

== Buildings ==
Name and location	Photograph	Date	Notes
St Catherine's Hall; 53.49482°N 1.14599°W		1838–39	Originally a large house, later part of a hospital, and since used as offices. It is in gault brick with slate roofs, and a square plan with an inner courtyard. The main ranges have two storeys, the rear wing has three storeys, and there is a higher three-stage tower. The front has seven bays, and at the corners and flanking the wide central bay are octagonal buttresses rising to embattled turrets. In the centre is a porte-cochère with four-centred arches, corner buttresses rising to gableted pinnacles with crocketed finials, between which is an embattled parapet, and above is a gable containing a coat of arms.
Gates, gate piers and walls, St Catherine's Hall; 53.49456°N 1.14620°W	—	c. 1838–39	The walls surround three sides of the garden, they are in stone, about 2 feet (0.61 m) high, with moulded copings, and are embattled at the comers and flanking the gates. The gate piers have moulded plinths and moulded capitals with brattishing, and the gates are in wrought iron.
St Peter's Church, Warmsworth; 53.50023°N 1.16796°W		1939–42	The church is in painted and rendered brick, with brick dressings, and blue-green glazed pantile roofs. It consists of a nave, a south porch, a chancel with a dome, a canted apse with a half-dome, a northeast Lady chapel, and a southeast vestry. On the chancel are octagonal walls carrying an octagonal dome with a cross finial.
