= Clifton, Doncaster =

Village in South Yorkshire, England

Coordinates: 53.462°N 1.219°W

Clifton
- Location within South Yorkshire
- OS grid reference: SK519964
  - London: 145 mi (233 km) SSE
- Metropolitan borough: Doncaster
- Metropolitan county: South Yorkshire
- Region: Yorkshire and the Humber
- Country: England
- Sovereign state: United Kingdom
- Post town: Rotherham
- Postcode district: S66
- Dialling code: 01709
- Police: South Yorkshire
- Fire: South Yorkshire
- Ambulance: Yorkshire
- UK Parliament: Rawmarsh and Conisbrough

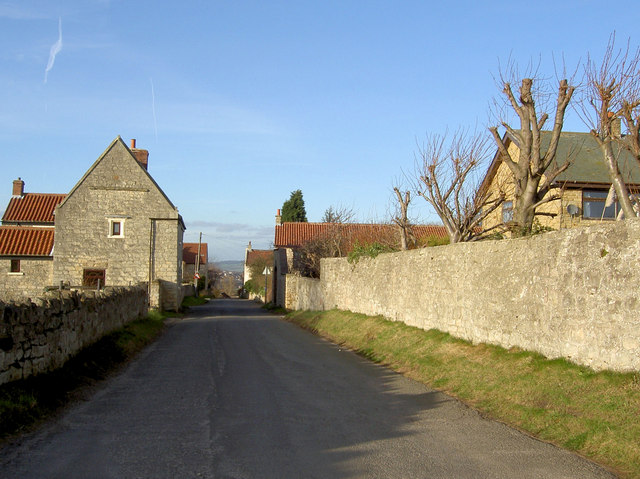
Common Lane, Clifton

Clifton is a small village to the south-west of Doncaster, within the boundary of the civil parish of Conisbrough Parks, which had a population of 385 at the 2001 Census, reducing to 374 at the 2011 Census.

Former Leeds United and Scotland football captain Billy Bremner was resident in Clifton until his death.
