= Thorpe in Balne =

Village and civil parish in South Yorkshire, England

Coordinates: 53.593°N 1.097°W

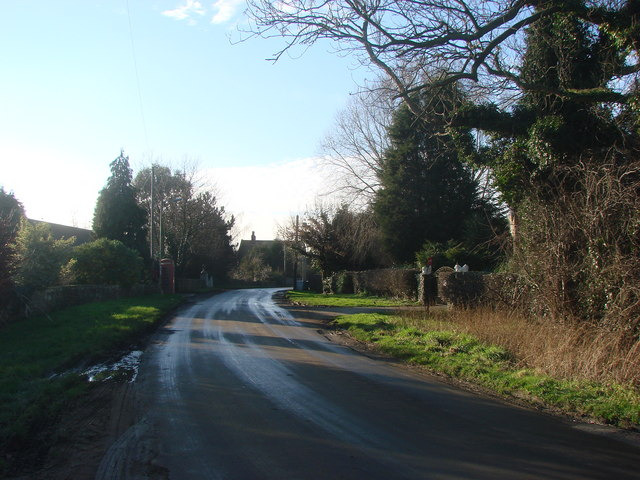
- Village street

- Location within South Yorkshire
- Population: 203 (2011 census)
- Civil parish: Thorpe in Balne
- Metropolitan borough: Doncaster
- Metropolitan county: South Yorkshire
- Region: Yorkshire and the Humber
- Country: England
- Sovereign state: United Kingdom
- Post town: DONCASTER
- Postcode district: DN6
- Dialling code: 01302
- Police: South Yorkshire
- Fire: South Yorkshire
- Ambulance: Yorkshire
- UK Parliament: Doncaster North

Thorpe in Balne is a village and civil parish in the Metropolitan Borough of Doncaster in South Yorkshire, England. It had a population of 176 at the 2001 census, increasing to 203 at the 2011 Census.

A moated site with a chapel and a fishpond near the manor house is a Grade II* listed monument. The chapel once served as the village church. Another moated site in the civil parish is located at Tilts.

Residents of Thorpe in Balne were asked to evacuate their homes during the 2019 United Kingdom floods.

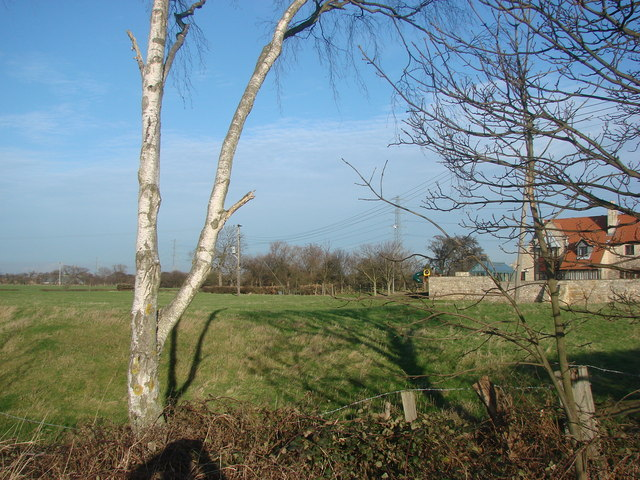
Moated site near the manor

== See also ==
- Listed buildings in Thorpe in Balne
