= Belle Vue, South Yorkshire =

Suburb of Doncaster, South Yorkshire, England

Coordinates: 53.5165°N 1.1045°W

Belle Vue
- Suburb
- Location within Borough of Doncaster Location within South Yorkshire
- Metropolitan borough: Doncaster
- Metropolitan county: South Yorkshire
- Region: Yorkshire and the Humber
- Country: England
- Sovereign state: United Kingdom
- Post town: Doncaster
- Postcode district: DN1, DN4
- Dialling code: 01302
- Police: South Yorkshire
- Fire: South Yorkshire
- Ambulance: Yorkshire
- UK Parliament: Doncaster Central

Belle Vue is an inner suburb of Doncaster, South Yorkshire, England.

It was the location of the home ground of Doncaster Rovers F.C. and the Doncaster Lakers RLFC, until 2007 (when the new Keepmoat Stadium replaced it. It had the 3rd biggest pitch in England at the time, and the pitch was in good state. In the 2005–06 season Doncaster had knocked out Aston Villa and Manchester City on this pitch in the League Cup.

The old ground was known as Belle Vue, but following commercial sponsorship (for the 2004–05 season) it was known as the Earth Stadium.

The stadium was demolished in 2007.
