= Bentley with Arksey =

Former civil parish in South Yorkshire, England

Coordinates: 53.551°N 1.137°W

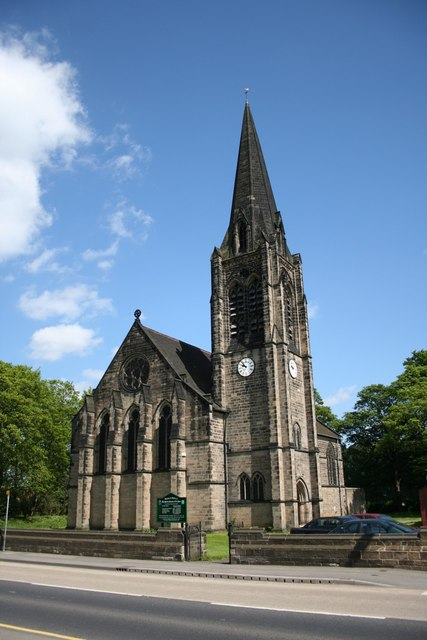
- Area
  - 1911: 3,227 acres (13.1 km^{2})
  - 1931: 5,128 acres (20.8 km^{2})
  - 1961: 4,950 acres (20.0 km^{2})
- Population
  - 1911: 6,497
  - 1931: 16,458
  - 1961: 22,961
- History
  - Created: 1866
  - Abolished: 1974
  - Succeeded by: Metropolitan Borough of Doncaster
- Status: Civil parish 1866–1974, Urban district 1911–1974
  - HQ: Bentley
- Boundary of Bentley with Arksey UD as of 1971

Bentley with Arksey is a former civil parish (1866–1974) and urban district (1911–1974) adjacent to the town of Doncaster in the West Riding of Yorkshire.

== Civil parish ==
The parish included the villages of Bentley, Arksey, Scawthorpe, Shaftholme and Tilts.

== Urban district ==
On 1 April 1911 the civil parish was removed from Doncaster Rural District and constituted a separate urban district. It was divided into five wards for election of members of the urban district council. The council's headquarters were in Cooke Street, Bentley.

== Abolition ==
From 1 April 1974 the Local Government Act 1972 reorganised administrative areas throughout England and Wales. Bentley and Arksey was combined with ten other authorities to form the Metropolitan Borough of Doncaster in South Yorkshire. At the census of 2001 it had a population of 33,968. No successor parish was formed so it became unparished.
