= Arksey =

Village in South Yorkshire, England

Coordinates: 53.5553°N 1.1256°W

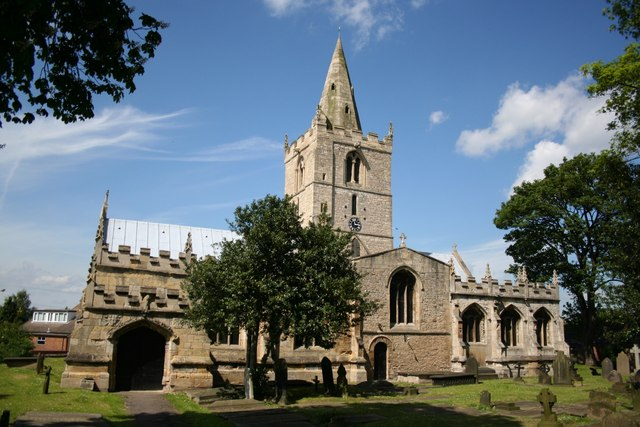
- All Saints' Church, Arksey

- Location within South Yorkshire
- Population: 1,303 (2010 est.)
- OS grid reference: SE580068
- Metropolitan borough: Doncaster
- Metropolitan county: South Yorkshire
- Region: Yorkshire and the Humber
- Country: England
- Sovereign state: United Kingdom
- Post town: DONCASTER
- Postcode district: DN5
- Dialling code: 01302
- Police: South Yorkshire
- Fire: South Yorkshire
- Ambulance: Yorkshire
- UK Parliament: Doncaster North

Arksey is a village in the City of Doncaster in South Yorkshire, England. It had an estimated population of 1,303 as of 2010. Arksey has four satellite hamlets: Shaftholme, Tilts, Almholme and Stockbridge.

Arksey is older than the Domesday Book. The name Arksey derives from the Old Norse personal name Arnkel combined with the Old English ēg meaning 'island'.

The Parish Church of All Saints is a Grade I listed building, dating back to the 1120s.

It was the birthplace of the children's writer Barbara Euphan Todd on 9 January 1890.

== See also ==
- Listed buildings in Doncaster (Bentley Ward)
- Arksey railway station
