= Sine FM =

Coordinates: 53.512°N 1.118°W

England
- Broadcast area: Doncaster, South Yorkshire (FM); Worldwide (Internet)
- Frequency: FM 102.6 MHz

Programming
- Format: Community

Ownership
- Owner: Higher Rhythm Ltd

History
- First air date: 26 September 2009

Links
- Webcast: 96 kbit/s
- Website: http://www.sinefm.com

Sine FM, sometimes known simply as Sine, is a community radio station based near the Eco-Power Stadium in Doncaster. It broadcasts 24/7 to the Metropolitan Borough of Doncaster on 102.6 FM and to the world on its website, Sine FM.com.

== History ==
Sine FM was Doncaster's first FM licensed community radio station and is now Doncaster's only licensed radio station, covering central Doncaster and the surrounding areas.

Sine FM was established in early 2007 by Higher Rhythm. It ran several trial broadcasts during 2007 and 2008 and its official 24/7 launch was in September 2009. The station was awarded its community radio licence from Ofcom in December 2007.

The station airs a wide range of programming based on a talk and music format.

It is an official media partner of local football club Doncaster Rovers and provides support for the club's podcasts.

The station holds the British record for the longest marathon radio show by a DJ team. A record 72 hours in length. It also held the world record for the longest marathon radio show by a DJ team for a short period in 2016.

== Location move ==
In October 2016, Sine FM moved from its old location at the Higher Rhythm recording studios on Nether Hall Road to its new location within the building of the XP School on Middle Bank next to the Keepmoat Stadium.
