= Conisbrough Parks =

Coordinates: 53.462°N 1.233°W

- Civil parish
- Location within South Yorkshire
- Area: 4.77 sq mi (12.4 km^{2})
- Population: 374 (2011)
  - Density: 78/sq mi (30/km^{2})
- Civil parish: Conisbrough Parks
- Metropolitan borough: Doncaster
- Metropolitan county: South Yorkshire
- Region: Yorkshire and the Humber
- Country: England
- Sovereign state: United Kingdom
- Post town: DONCASTER
- Postcode district: DN12
- Post town: ROTHERHAM
- Postcode district: S66
- Dialling code: 01709
- Police: South Yorkshire
- Fire: South Yorkshire
- Ambulance: Yorkshire

Conisbrough Parks is a civil parish in the Metropolitan Borough of Doncaster and ceremonial county of South Yorkshire in England. It had a population of 385 at the 2001 Census, reducing to 374 at the 2011 Census.

The parish covers mostly rural land between the towns of Conisbrough and Edlington including the small village of Clifton.
