= Listed buildings in Doncaster (Hexthorpe and Balby North Ward) =

Hexthorpe and Balby North is a ward in the metropolitan borough of Doncaster, South Yorkshire, England. The ward contains three listed buildings that are recorded in the National Heritage List for England. All the listed buildings are designated at Grade II, the lowest of the three grades, which is applied to "buildings of national importance and special interest". The ward is a suburb to the west of the centre of Doncaster, and the listed buildings consist of a cemetery chapel, a former Methodist chapel, and a memorial drinking fountain and lamp.

== Buildings ==
Name and location	Photograph	Date	Notes
Cemetery Chapel, Hyde Park Cemetery; 53.51475°N 1.13229°W		1855	The cemetery chapel is in stone, with slate roofs, and it consists of two single-storey chapels at right angles with a steeple between. At the base of the steeple is an archway with a pointed head, a moulded surround and moulded capitals, and above it are two lancet windows. The tower has two stages, the upper stage is square at the base and octagonal above, and on each corner is a buttress rising to a pinnacle. At the top is a moulded cornice and a low parapet with eight crocketed pinnacles, and it is surmounted by an octagonal spire with gableted lucarnes. The chapels have lean-to vestries, and Decorated tracery in the windows.
Former Primitive Methodist Chapel, Balby; 53.50943°N 1.14578°W	—	1867–68	The former chapel is in red brick with dressings in white and blue stone and brick, it has a slate roof, and it is in High Victorian style. The front has five bays, the wider three bays projecting under a gable with machicolations and ornate iron finials. In the outer of these bays are round-arched doorways with pilasters containing ornate carving in panels, in the capitals, and in the tympani. The middle bay contains an arcade of three arches, above which are three tall round-headed windows with carving in the spandrels, and in front is a Latin cross.
Patrick Stirling Memorial Lamp and Drinking Fountain; 53.51400°N 1.15150°W	—	1890	The drinking fountain was commissioned by workers of the Great Northern Railway to commemorate the birthday of the engineer Patrick Stirling. It is in granite on a sandstone base, and is 4.5 metres (15 ft) high. The base is octagonal on an octagonal step, and rising from it is a circular column in grey granite, and four semicircular basins. Above these are inscribed plaques flanked by pink granite colonnettes with moulded capitals, and a moulded cap. On the cap is a moulded finial with a replica lamp and a lion.
