= Penistone Rural District =

District in England

Coordinates: 53.526°N 1.631°W

Penistone Rural District was a rural district in the West Riding of Yorkshire. It was named after but did not contain Penistone. The town itself was contained within the Penistone Urban District.

The district was abolished in 1974 by the Local Government Act 1972 and went on to be part of the newly formed Metropolitan Borough of Barnsley in the, also newly formed, metropolitan county of South Yorkshire.
