= Tilts =

Hamlet in South Yorkshire, England

Coordinates: 53.5779°N 1.1373°W

- Hamlet
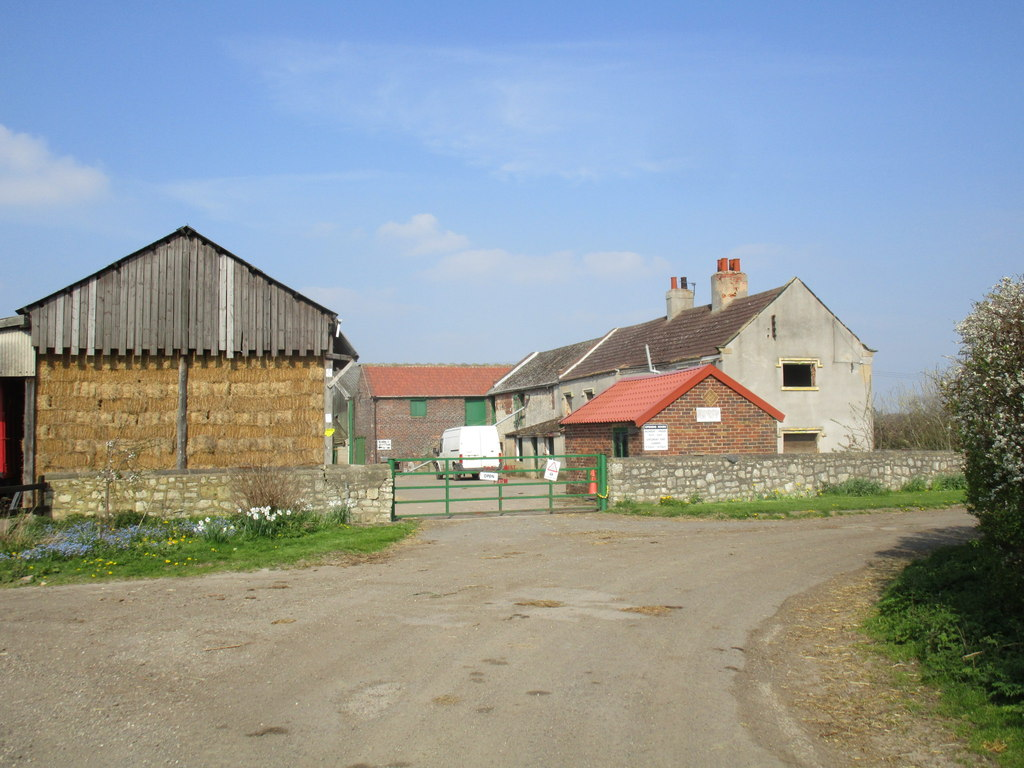
- Tilts West Farm

- Location within South Yorkshire
- OS grid reference: SE572093
  - London: 240 mi (390 km) SSE
- Metropolitan borough: Doncaster
- Metropolitan county: South Yorkshire
- Region: Yorkshire and the Humber
- Country: England
- Sovereign state: United Kingdom
- Post town: Doncaster
- Postcode district: DN5
- Dialling code: 01302
- Police: South Yorkshire
- Fire: South Yorkshire
- Ambulance: Yorkshire
- UK Parliament: Doncaster North

Tilts is a hamlet in the City of Doncaster, South Yorkshire, England, some 4 miles (6.4 km) north of Doncaster city centre and 3 miles (4.8 km) south of Askern. Aside from some farms, there is a moated site which is a scheduled monument.
