= Balby =

Suburb and civil parish in South Yorkshire, England

Coordinates: 53.5046°N 1.1533°W

- Suburb
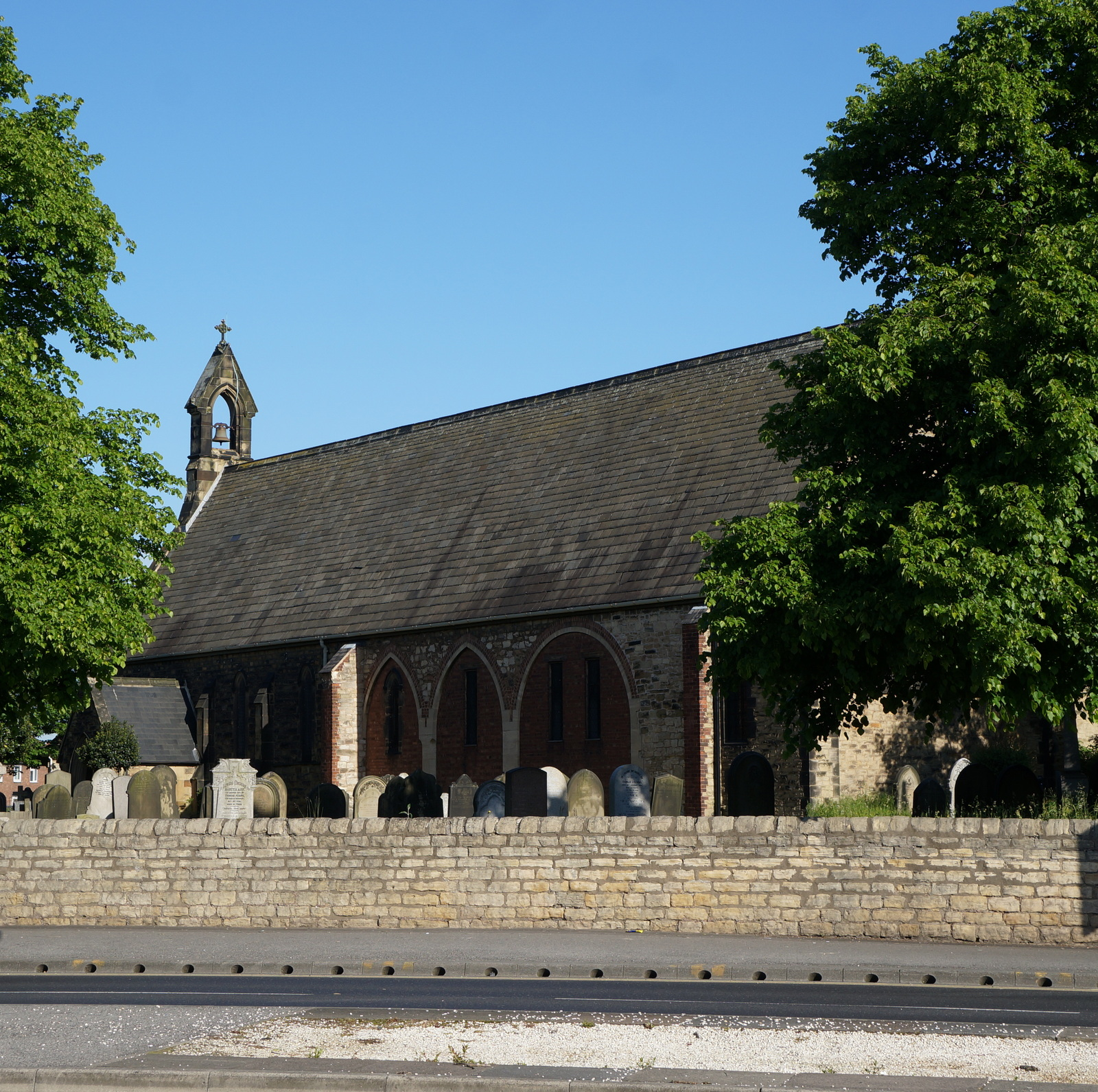
- St John the Evangelist Church

- Location within South Yorkshire
- Population: 15,332 (Population of Balby ward at 2011 census)
- OS grid reference: SE561012
- Metropolitan borough: City of Doncaster
- Metropolitan county: South Yorkshire
- Region: Yorkshire and the Humber
- Country: England
- Sovereign state: United Kingdom
- Post town: DONCASTER
- Postcode district: DN4
- Dialling code: 01302
- Police: South Yorkshire
- Fire: South Yorkshire
- Ambulance: Yorkshire
- UK Parliament: Doncaster Central

Balby is a suburb of Doncaster in South Yorkshire, England, located south-west of the city centre. Historically part of the West Riding of Yorkshire, Balby is within the Doncaster Central constituency and contains the electoral wards Balby South and Hexthorpe and Balby North.

Housing stock ranging from terraced housing nearer to Doncaster town centre and post-war suburbs to the south west. There are several new housing developments, including Woodfield Plantation, which is part of an attempt to regenerate the area following deindustrialisation.

Economic activity is still centred on heavy industry, especially around the Carr Hill Industrial Estate, home to Bridon, a large rope manufacturer.

== History ==
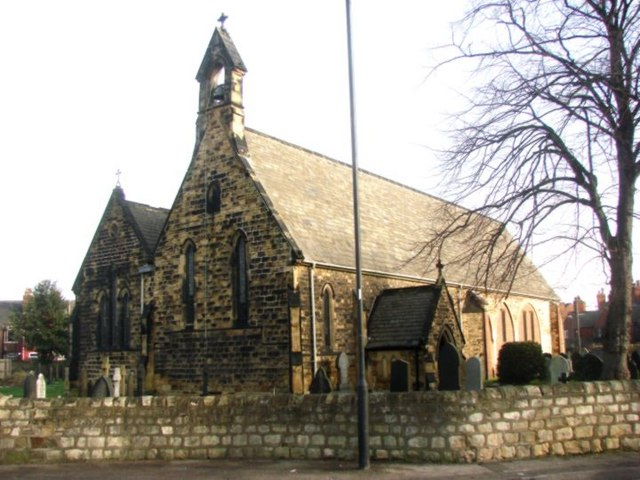
St John the Evangelist's Church

The earliest written reference to Balby occurs in the Domesday Book (1086), which records the name as Balle(s)bi. This almost certainly derives from a personal name, Balli, together with the Old Norse word býr (meaning a farmstead). This dates the foundation of Balby to some time in the period of Viking settlement, between the late 8th and early 11th centuries.

Balby, which then included Warmsworth, was home to several of the early followers of the Quaker faith in England, including Thomas Aldham, whose son William was instrumental in opening the first permanent meeting house in the area, in Quaker Lane, Warmsworth. Balby has long been associated, along with other areas of Doncaster, with Quakerism, having a large Quaker community.

More recently, the suburban town was a centre for steel and brass manufacture, especially at the well-known Pegler's Brass Foundry and Bridon Ropery.

In the 1830s, St Catherine's House, designed by Leeds-based architect John Clark, was built as a retirement home for George Banks, a wealthy cloth merchant and former Mayor of Leeds, in the south of Balby, near to the site of St Catherine's Well, an ancient site of healing and pilgrimage. In the 1920s it was bought by a local health board, together with a substantial area of the estate surrounding it, to operate as a mental health institution, St Catherine's Hospital, which continued to operate within the NHS until the 1980s. It remains owned by the NHS and operates as a not for profit social enterprise, offering conferencing facilities, a cafe and a walled garden.

== Education ==
Astrea Academy Woodfields is the only secondary school in the Balby area. Balby Central Primary Academy, Carr Lodge Academy, Mallard Primary School, St Francis Xavier Catholic Primary School, Waverley Primary Academy and Woodfield Primary School are the primary schools in Balby. Sycamore Hall Preparatory School is an independent primary and there is also specialist provision at Maple Medical PRU, incorporating Hospital Tuition, the Young Parents Centre/Link/JASP and the Mulberry unit.

== Amenities ==
Potteric Carr Nature Reserve is a natural wetland near the Lakeside development. The site reopened in 2011 following extensive restoration by Yorkshire Wildlife Trust and charges an admission fee.

Carr Lodge Nature Reserve is a low-lying grassland, managed by Yorkshire Wildlife Trust. It is flooded in winter but dries out in summer and is used by local birdwatchers.

Flourish Enterprises is a non-for-profit social enterprise based at St Catherine's House in Woodfield Park, which offers extensive grounds for walking and recreation. It runs a cafe based in the house, together with an historic Walled Garden which is free to access and grows and sells its own plants, and fruit and vegetables. A range of services are provided from the site including therapeutic services, an antiques shop, barbers, yoga studio, and squash club.

== Popular culture ==
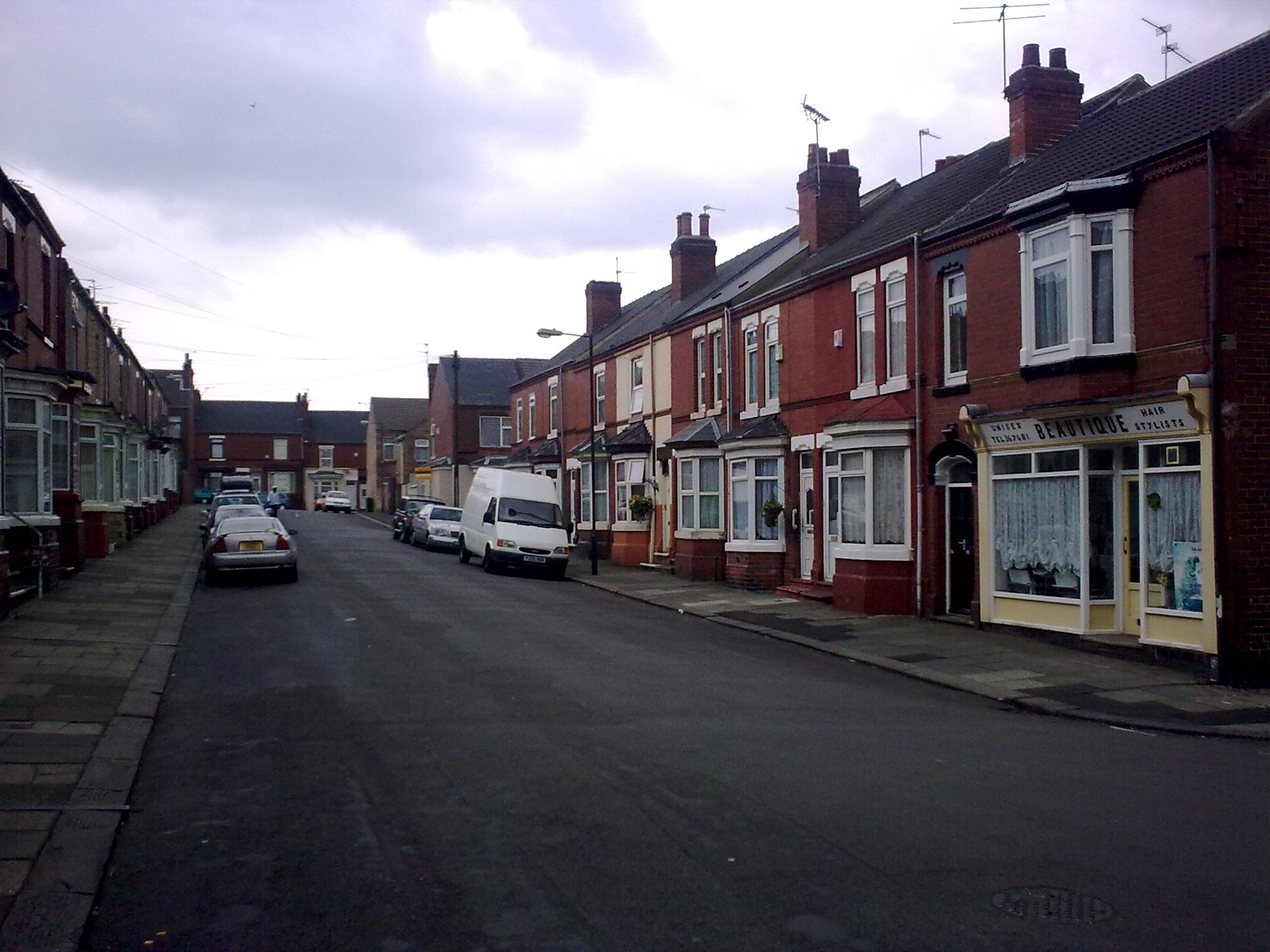
Lister Avenue; the setting for Open All Hours and Still Open All Hours

The external scenes for the BBC comedy Open All Hours were set and filmed on Lister Avenue, Balby. The shop (Lister Avenue at junction with Scarth Avenue) which served as Arkwright's grocery store was, and still is, a hairdresser's which was converted for the duration of filming.

== See also ==
- Listed buildings in Doncaster (Balby South Ward)
- Listed buildings in Doncaster (Hexthorpe and Balby North Ward)
