= Warmsworth =

Village and civil parish in South Yorkshire, England

Coordinates: 53.50°N 1.18°W

- Village
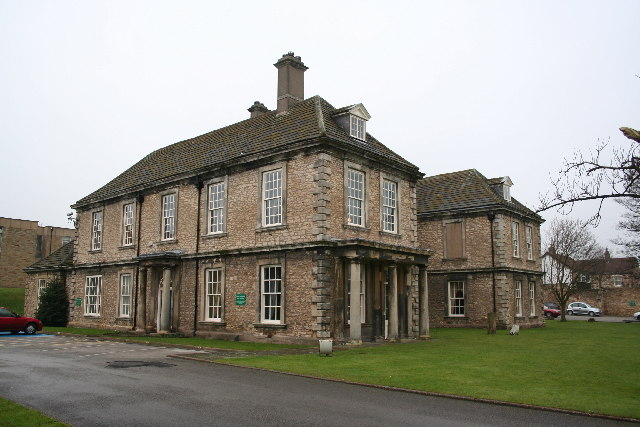
- Warmsworth Hall

- Location within South Yorkshire
- Population: 3,887 (2011 Census)
- Civil parish: Warmsworth
- Metropolitan borough: City of Doncaster
- Metropolitan county: South Yorkshire
- Region: Yorkshire and the Humber
- Country: England
- Sovereign state: United Kingdom
- Post town: DONCASTER
- Postcode district: DN4
- Dialling code: 01302
- Police: South Yorkshire
- Fire: South Yorkshire
- Ambulance: Yorkshire
- Website: Warmsworth Parish Council

Warmsworth is a village and civil parish of Doncaster in the City of Doncaster in South Yorkshire, England. Its population was estimated at 3,908 in 2019. The village lies along the A1(M) Doncaster Bypass and the A630. The River Don is close to the village. Sprotbrough, Edlington, Conisbrough, Levitt Hagg and Balby surround Warmsworth. It lies 4 miles (6.5 km) from Doncaster.

== History ==
Until 1974, Warmsworth was part of the West Riding of Yorkshire, when it then became part of the new county of South Yorkshire. Warmsworth was mentioned in the 11th century Domesday Book, a detailed survey and valuation of all the land held by the King William I and his chief tenants. At this time it was recorded as Wemesford. The name gradually changed to Wormsford, and then to the present day Warmsworth. It has been suggested that "ford" indicated that it was close to the river's edge, and the "Wemes" or "Worm" meant the most sheltered site in that area.

St Peter's Church, Warmsworth is in the deanery of Doncaster. Also known as The White Church, it was consecrated in 1942 to replace a small early 19th-century church on a different site. The church was designed after a period which the rector had spent in California, and his experiences there influenced the whitewashed brick appearance of the building.

Warmsworth was the home of the Quaker Thomas Aldham, who was instrumental, with George Fox, in founding the nearby Balby meeting (congregation). The parish included Carr House, where Leonard Childers bred the famous racehorse Flying Childers.

== Warmsworth Hall ==
Warmsworth Hall is a Grade II* listed building built in 1702–1703 for John Battie II. It is a smaller version of Belton House near Grantham, built to a compact H-plan. It remained a dwelling until the 1950s, when it became the headquarters of British Ropes Ltd, and later a hotel.

== Dolomite Quarry ==
Next to the village is a dolomite limestone quarry operated by Sibelco. It is the only site in the region producing industrial minerals on a major scale.

== See also ==
- Listed buildings in Warmsworth
- Listed buildings in Doncaster (Balby South Ward)
