= Loversall =

Village and civil parish in South Yorkshire, England

Coordinates: 53°28′52″N 1°08′11″W

- Village
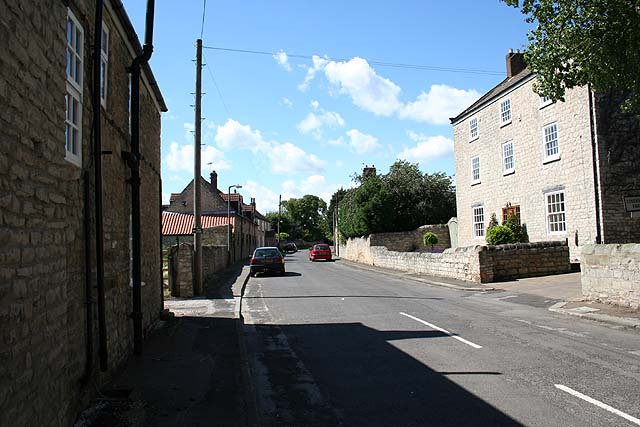

- Location within City of Doncaster Location within South Yorkshire
- Population: 156 (2011 Census)
- Civil parish: Loversall
- Metropolitan borough: Doncaster
- Metropolitan county: South Yorkshire
- Region: Yorkshire and the Humber
- Country: England
- Sovereign state: United Kingdom
- Post town: DONCASTER
- Postcode district: DN11
- Dialling code: 01302
- Police: South Yorkshire
- Fire: South Yorkshire
- Ambulance: Yorkshire
- UK Parliament: Doncaster Central

Loversall is a village and civil parish in the City of Doncaster in South Yorkshire, England. It has a population of 128, increasing to 156 at the 2011 Census.

The village consists mainly of residential properties and farm buildings. There is also a popular children's nursery. Although there was once a village shop there are no shops currently located within the village. However, there is a major supermarket adjacent to Loversall Parish, within the development known as Woodfield Plantation. There are also a small number of shops and a Post Office in the adjacent village of Wadworth.

Loversall Lakes (Quarry Farm) is a popular fishing facility and periodically the fields around Loversall are used for clay pigeon shooting.

The name Loversall derives from the Old English Leofhereshalh meaning 'Leofhere's nook of land'.

St Katherines Church is a Grade II* listed building. It appears to have been built before 1207 by the Fossard family, who owned the Manor of Hexthorpe under Count Robert de Mortain (half brother to William the Conqueror). Within the churchyard lies an early 14th-century tomb chest which is also Grade II* listed.

Loversall Hall, next to the church, is a large but plainly-built house, its principal front built by the Fenton family of Leeds between 1808 and 1816, although the buildings at the rear are probably seventeenth century. Loversall was part of the manor of Doncaster, and its church, dedicated to St Katherine, was technically a chapel of ease in the parish of Doncaster, rather than a fully-fledged parish church.

There are a number of working farms in the Parish, including Quarry Farm adjacent to the A60 and Loversall Farm, the farmhouse for which is located within the village. Pear Tree Farm, also within the village, is no longer a working farm but the farmhouse, thought to be around 250 years old, remains in residential use.

== History of the Parish of Loversall ==
The history of Loversall's parish records illustrates both the vulnerability of archives and one of the uses of bishop's transcripts. Although the church at Loversall is medieval, the parish registers begin only in the nineteenth century. The reason for this lies in the events of a winter's night on 7 and 8 February 1844, when thieves broke into the church. They broke open the parish chest, probably in hope of stealing the communion plate. Finding no valuable contents, they made a fire to warm themselves in the bitter winter weather. Their fuel was the oak chest and most of its contents, namely all the parish registers but the most recent marriage and burial registers.

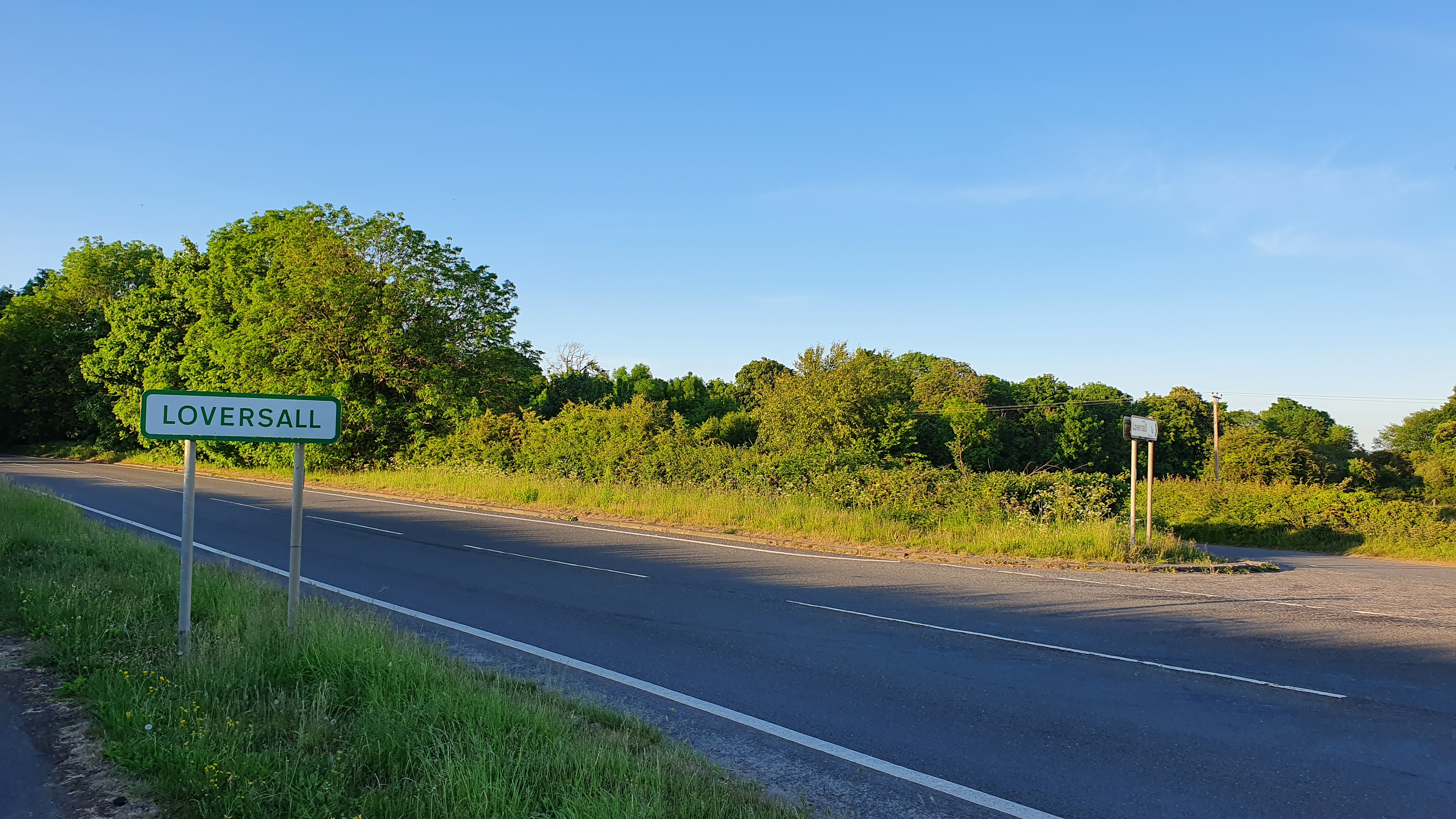
Access to Loversall via A60 From South

The information in the registers was not irretrievably lost. Since 1598, parishes had been obliged to make a yearly return to the bishop of the diocese, listing all the baptisms, marriages and burials which had taken place in the parish in the previous year. Loversall, like other local parishes, sent in its returns to York, and these are now to be found in the Borthwick Institute for Archives, along with all the other records of the archdiocese of York. The parish register transcripts for Loversall survive from 1601 to 1830, and so most of the information which would have been found in the parish registers is still available to family historians.

== Loversall as a Conservation area ==
Loversall was designated a conservation area on 19 October 1979.

The character of Loversall Conservation Area is that of a small open grained village of traditional limestone buildings with clay pantile roofs. The village appears to have grown within the Loversall Hall parkland to serve the listed Loversall Hall. The main street appears from map evidence to have continued to the south east past the listed dovecote and walled garden to Loversall Hall. This was blocked off possibly when the route to the Hall was diverted to the north around the time the Hall was rebuilt in 1811.

Historically domestic and agricultural buildings, probably tied to the Loversall estate, developed along Bubup Hill. These front the road and are almost exclusively of coursed rubble limestone and clay pantiles which gives a homogeneous character to this part of the conservation area. The most significant of these is Loversall Farm which was the major farm of the village. Its importance is demonstrated by being three storeys high rather than two storeys which is the norm of the village. Being elevated and with no development in front of it the building dominates the key view on approaching from Wadworth. To the east is Loversall Hall and its curtilage buildings. Part of the walled garden survives with the listed dovecote to one corner though the walled garden is now subdivided between two modern properties. South and west of the drive approaching the hall is parkland in character and is designated as Green Belt. Formerly, this part of the conservation area would have been relatively open but 20th century developments have infilled the land between Bubup Hill and the Hall. Some of this is incongruous and suburban in character. The most unusual of these infills is a pair of Swedish timber bungalows introduced in 1948.

=== Listed Buildings in Loversall Conservation Area ===
There are five listed structures within the area.

- Church of St Katherine Grade II* EH reference 334820
- Tomb Chest (churchyard) Grade II* EH reference 334821
- Grave Slab (churchyard) Grade II EH reference 334822
- Loversall Hall Grade II EH reference 334823
- Dovecote Grade II EH reference 334824
