= Shaftholme =

Hamlet in South Yorkshire, England

Coordinates: 53.567°N 1.131°W

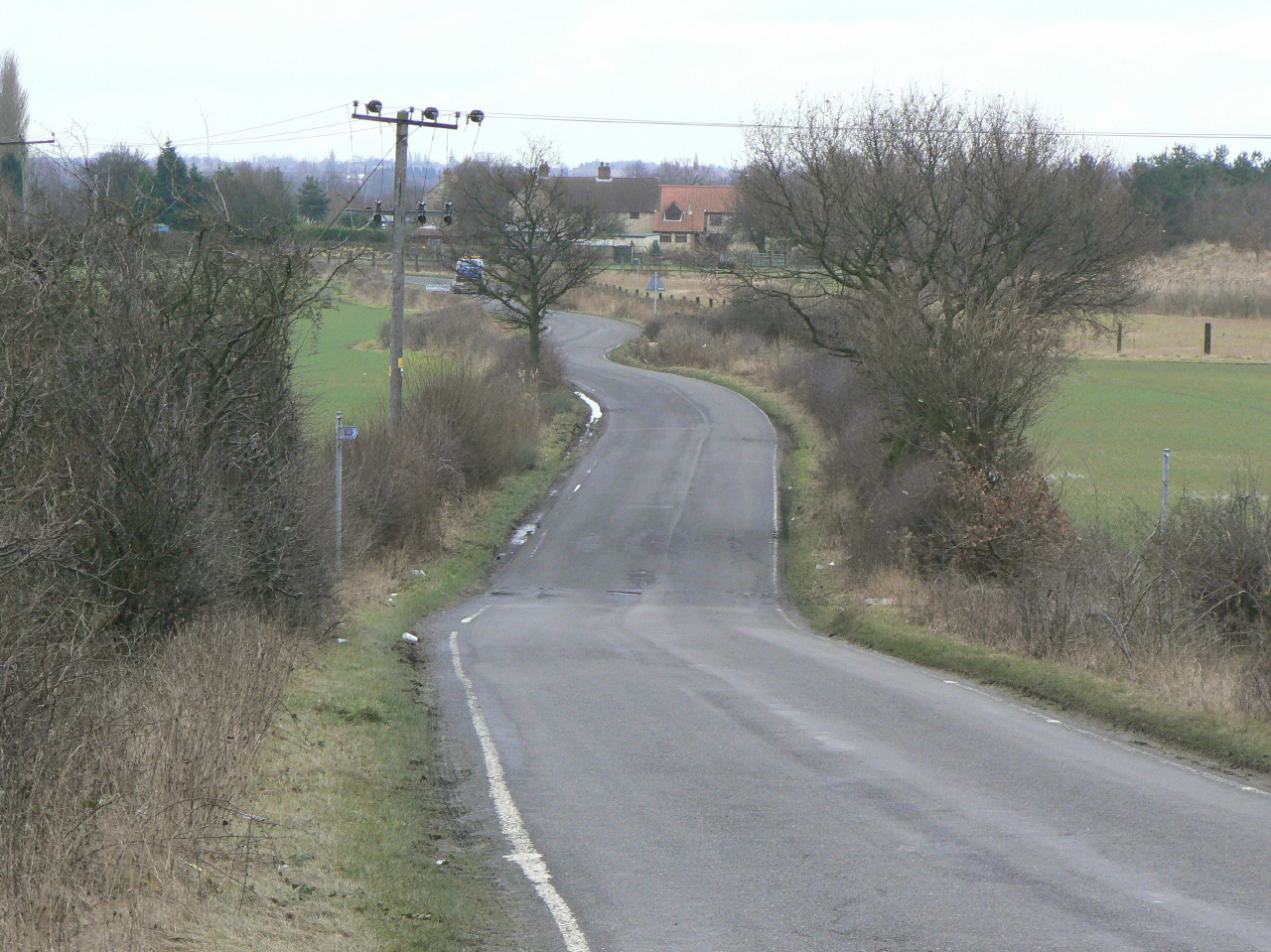
View towards Shaftholme

Shaftholme is a small hamlet in South Yorkshire, England. It forms part of the parish of Arksey, located 0.5 miles (0.8 km) north of Bentley and two miles north of Doncaster.
