= Wheatley Hills =

Village in South Yorkshire, England

Coordinates: 53.5364°N 1.0991°W

- Location within the Borough of Doncaster Location within South Yorkshire
- Population: 17,733 (2011 census)
- OS grid reference: SE575024
- Metropolitan borough: Doncaster
- Metropolitan county: South Yorkshire
- Region: Yorkshire and the Humber
- Country: England
- Sovereign state: United Kingdom
- Post town: DONCASTER
- Postcode district: DN2
- Dialling code: 01302
- Police: South Yorkshire
- Fire: South Yorkshire
- Ambulance: Yorkshire

Wheatley Hills is a suburb of Doncaster, South Yorkshire, England. It is situated around 2 miles (3.2 km) north-east of the city centre. The Wheatley Hills & Intake ward within the Metropolitan Borough of Doncaster had a population of 17,733 at the 2011 census.

Wheatley means wheat fields in Old English, located at the eastern end of the central ridge that runs through most of the town. The surrounding region was often flooded in the times before the River Don was rerouted and extra drainage channels dug, and lies on the old floodplain of the Don, which peaked at today's Thorne Road. Originally the suburb was part of the Wheatley, but due to the expansion of housing during the post-war era and boundary changes, Wheatley Hills became a separate area in its own right.

== History ==
The 1930s saw the first houses built in what would become Wheatley Hills. Originally known as the Hills Lane Estate, it centred on The Grove with the eastern edge being marked by Boundary Avenue. Wheatley Hills reached its present size during the 1950s with the development of the Ennerdale Estate to the south of the original Hills Lane Estate, and the Greenleafe Estate east of Boundary Avenue.

== Sport ==
North 1 East Rugby Union team, Wheatley Hills RUFC are named in conjunction with the suburb. They are based at Brunnel Road in the York Road Industrial Estate just outside Doncaster Town Centre. Notably the training ground is not actually in the Wheatley Hills area. The club was originally formed as Wheatley Secondary Modern Old Boys in the 1960s but very soon became an 'open club' still playing its home games at the school and using the nearby Wheatley Hotel as its headquarters. In the 1970s the club moved to the Pilkington Glassworks Recreation Ground and Social Club before acquiring its present site.

Wheatley Hills Tennis Club lies on Greenhouse Road. Established in 1954, the club offers professional coaching to players of all ages. The Wheatley Golf club lies nearby on Armthorpe Road. The course itself ranges in length, alongside Leger Way adjacent to the west of Wheatley Hills.

== Transport ==
In 1902, Wheatley Hills was served by the Doncaster Tramway from the town to the terminus on Thorne Road. A trolleybus service in the 1950s became available further into the suburb when the tram service became defunct in the late 1920s to mid-1930s.

Today, Wheatley Hills is well served by public transport links to Doncaster city centre. Leading bus company First South Yorkshire operate Service 65 to Wheatley Hills, running regularly every 30 minutes during peak time journeys, via Intake.

== Places of worship ==
- St Aidan's Church of England - located on Central Boulevard.
- Our Lady Of Mount Carmel Catholic Church - located off Armthorpe Road

== Notable people ==
- Julia Mallam - former Emmerdale actress, who played Dawn Woods in the popular ITV soap from 2003 to 2006.
- Lindsey Strutt - Glamour model Nuts
- Mick McMichael - Professional Wrestler
- Mitch Rose - professional footballer with Grimsby Town
