= Denaby =

Civil parish in South Yorkshire, England

Coordinates: 53.484°N 1.272°W

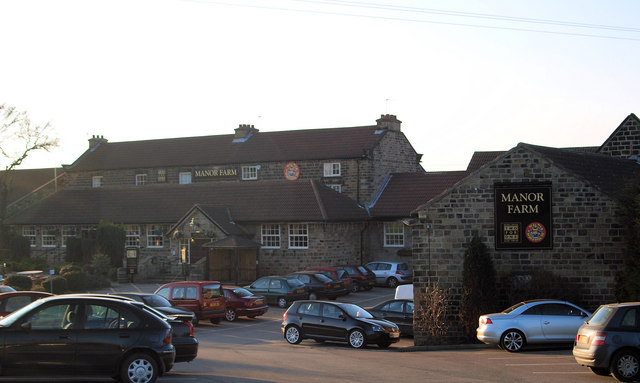
Manor Farm pub in Old Denaby

Denaby is a civil parish in the Metropolitan Borough of Doncaster in South Yorkshire, England. It had a population in 2001 of 326, increasing slightly to 329 at the 2011 Census. Denaby was historically a township within the parish of Mexborough. It became a separate civil parish in 1866. In 1921 the eastern part of the parish including Denaby Main was transferred to neighbouring Conisbrough, leaving the parish of Denaby focussed on the older village, now known as Old Denaby. Old Denaby is in the Parliamentary constituency of Don Valley.
