= Askern =

Town and civil parish in South Yorkshire, England

Coordinates: 53.6167°N 1.15°W

- Town and civil parish
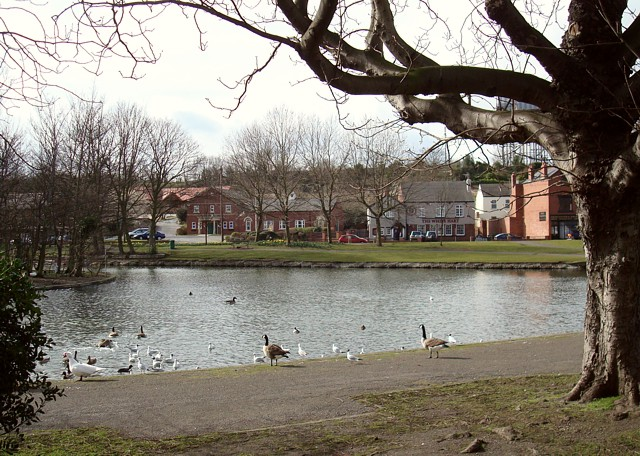
- Askern Spa Pool

- Location within South Yorkshire
- Area: 1.33 sq mi (3.4 km^{2})
- Population: 5,570 (2011 census)
  - Density: 4,188/sq mi (1,617/km^{2})
- OS grid reference: SE5513
- Civil parish: Askern
- Metropolitan borough: City of Doncaster
- Metropolitan county: South Yorkshire
- Region: Yorkshire and the Humber
- Country: England
- Sovereign state: United Kingdom
- Post town: DONCASTER
- Postcode district: DN6
- Dialling code: 01302
- Police: South Yorkshire
- Fire: South Yorkshire
- Ambulance: Yorkshire
- UK Parliament: Doncaster North

Askern (/ˈæskərn/) is a town and civil parish within the City of Doncaster, in South Yorkshire, England. It is on the A19 road between Doncaster and Selby. Historically part of the West Riding of Yorkshire, it had a population of 5,570 at the 2011 Census. Askern was also known in for its greyhound stadium, which closed in 2022.

== History ==
The town's name derives from the Old English askr-ærn meaning 'building made of ash' or 'building surrounded by ash trees'. Historically in the parish of Campsall, the town lies 9 miles (14 km) south of Pontefract and 7 miles (11 km) north of Doncaster. Up until the middle of the 19th century, the town was in the wapentake of Osgoldcross in the West Riding of Yorkshire.

The history of Askern can be traced back to the reign of Edward III. The people of Norton complained to the Sheriff of Osgoldcross that the people of Askern had failed to keep part of Askern Pool in a clean state. As a result, the King's highway had been "overflowed and drowned so that neither horse nor foot passengers could use it."

The parish church of St Peter's dates back to 1852.

=== Spa ===
In the 19th century, Askern was a popular spa resort. The sulphurous nature of Askern Lake had long been recognised and the first bathing house opened in 1786. In the 1820s and 1830s, several hotels opened in the village, turning it into a small spa town. Visitor numbers increased when the railway station opened in 1848. By the 20th century, the resort's popularity had declined and the coming of coal mining permanently changed the character of the town. The last bathhouse was demolished in the 1960s.

=== Coal mining ===
In the early years of the 20th century, the quest for coal identified a good seam of coal near Askern. In 1911, it was decided to access the coal from a mine built above the village. As the mine opened, the new houses were built for the workers and their families in the village. The pit was closed in 1991, due to a low in the price of coal and the surface buildings were demolished in 1993.

== Transport ==
=== Railway ===
Askern lies on the former Lancashire and Yorkshire Railway line between Doncaster and Wakefield Kirkgate, though Askern railway station closed in 1947. The line is used mainly by goods services, as well as the four-times daily Grand Central passenger services from Bradford Interchange to London King's Cross. There have been proposals to reopen Askern railway station to passenger trains.

=== Buses ===
Askern is served by route 51 to Doncaster, Carcroft, Skellow and Norton. There are also two school bus services from the town.

== See also ==
- List of Yorkshire pits
