= City of Doncaster =

Metropolitan borough in England

Coordinates: 53°31′21″N 1°07′43″W

- Metropolitan borough and city
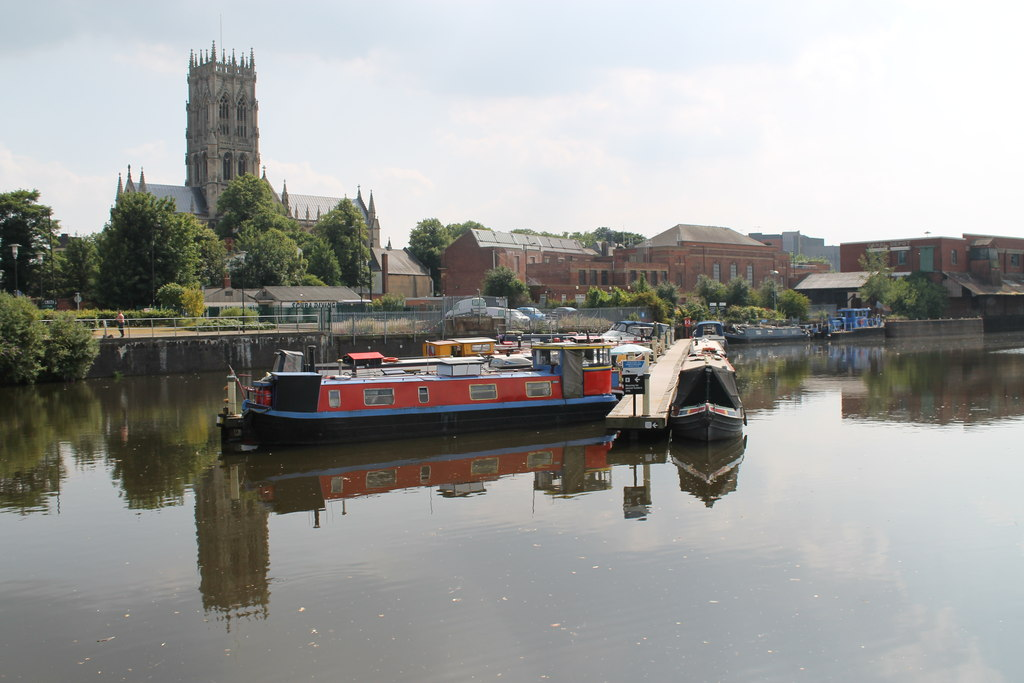
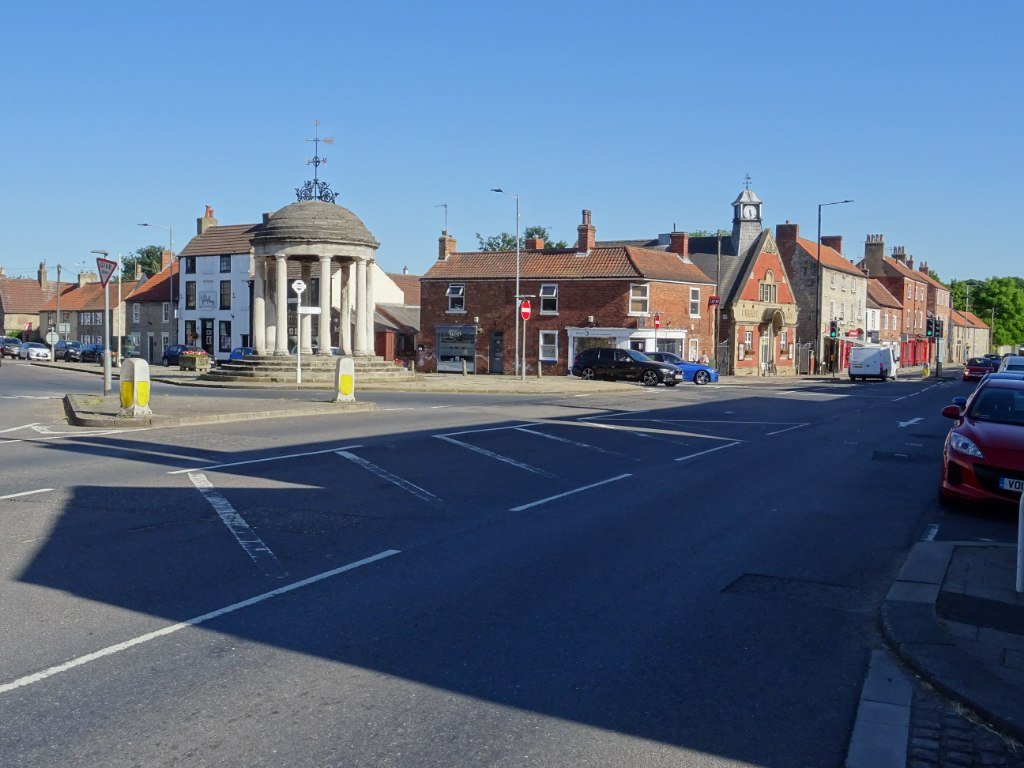
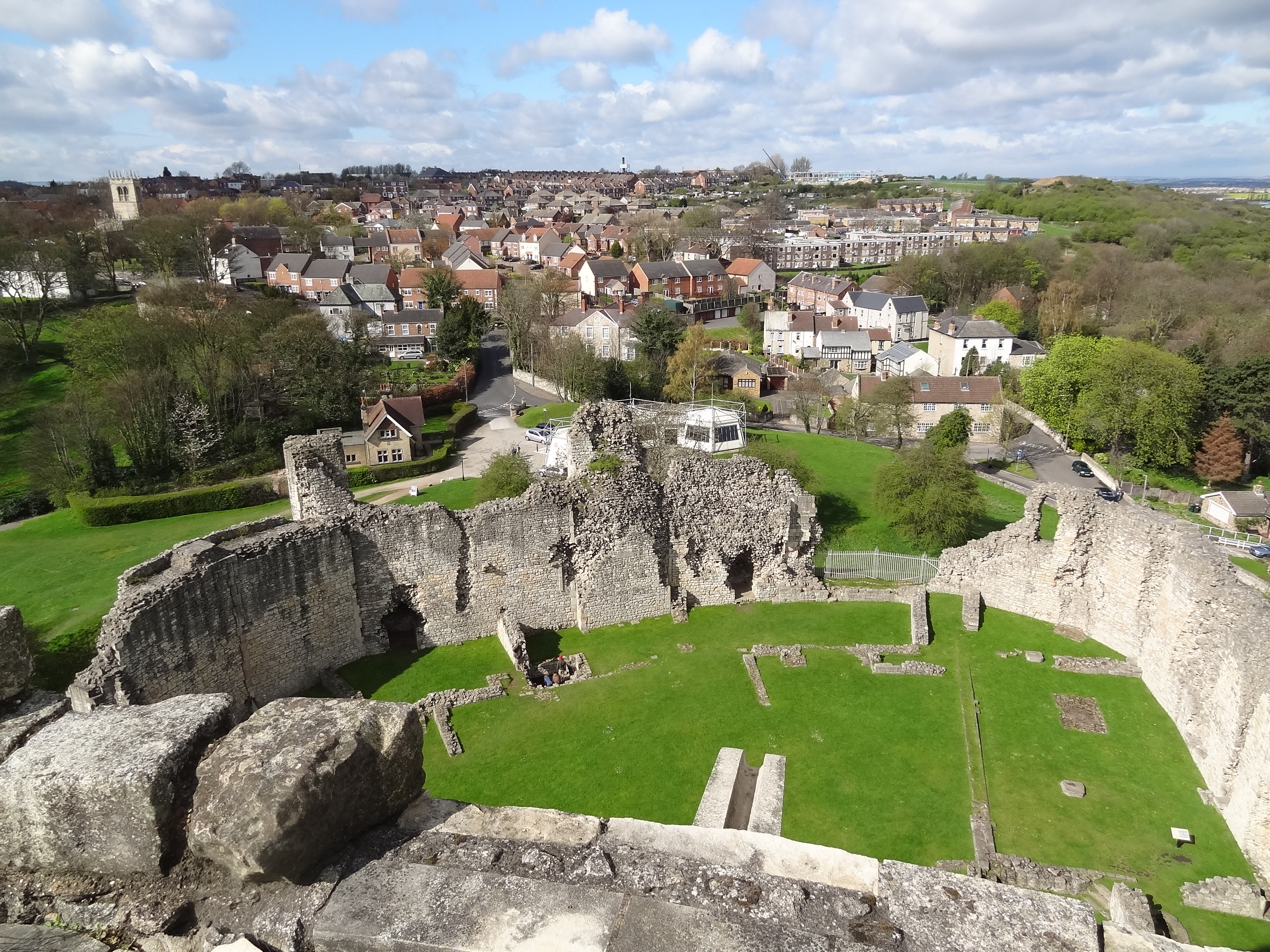
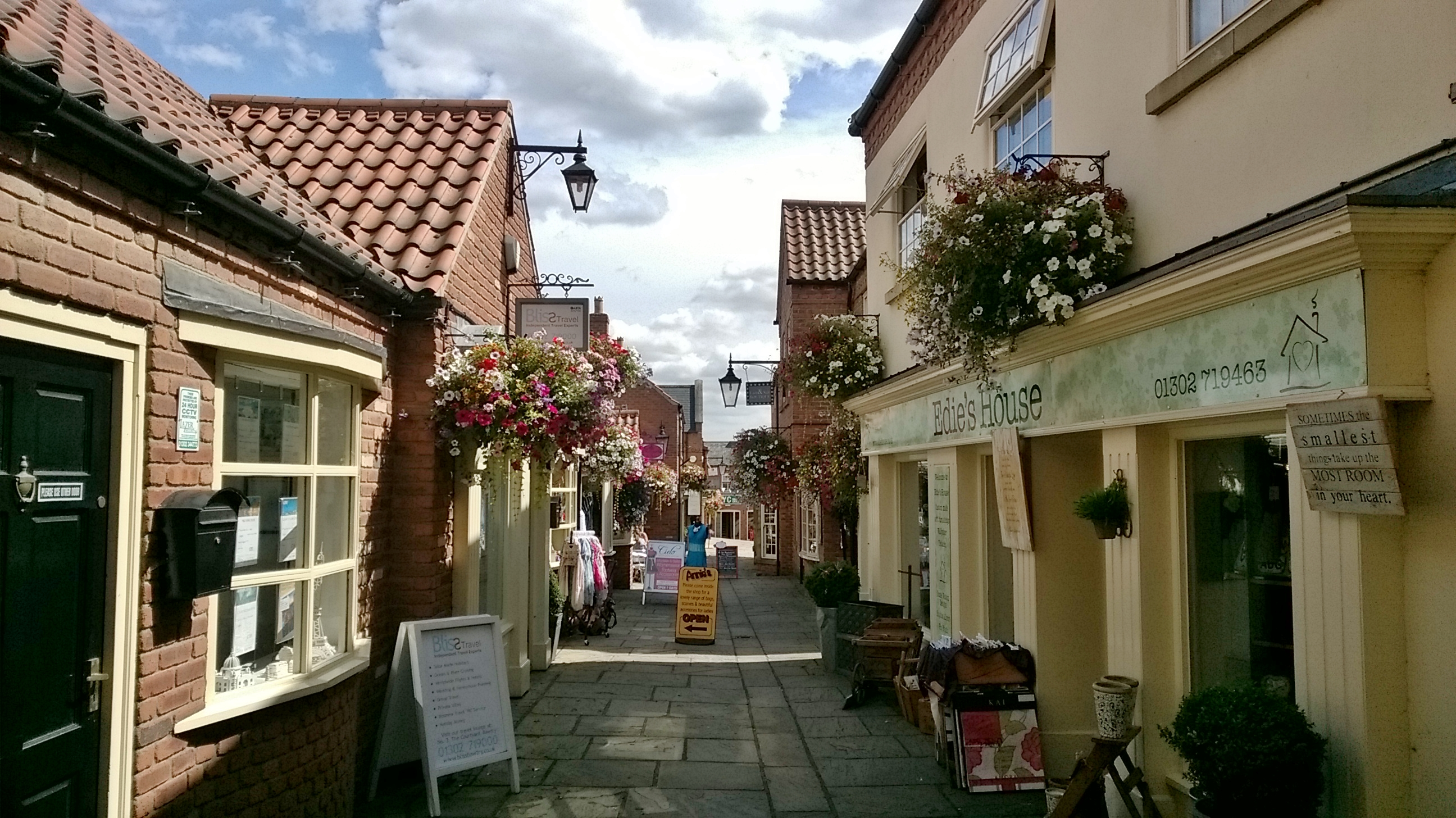
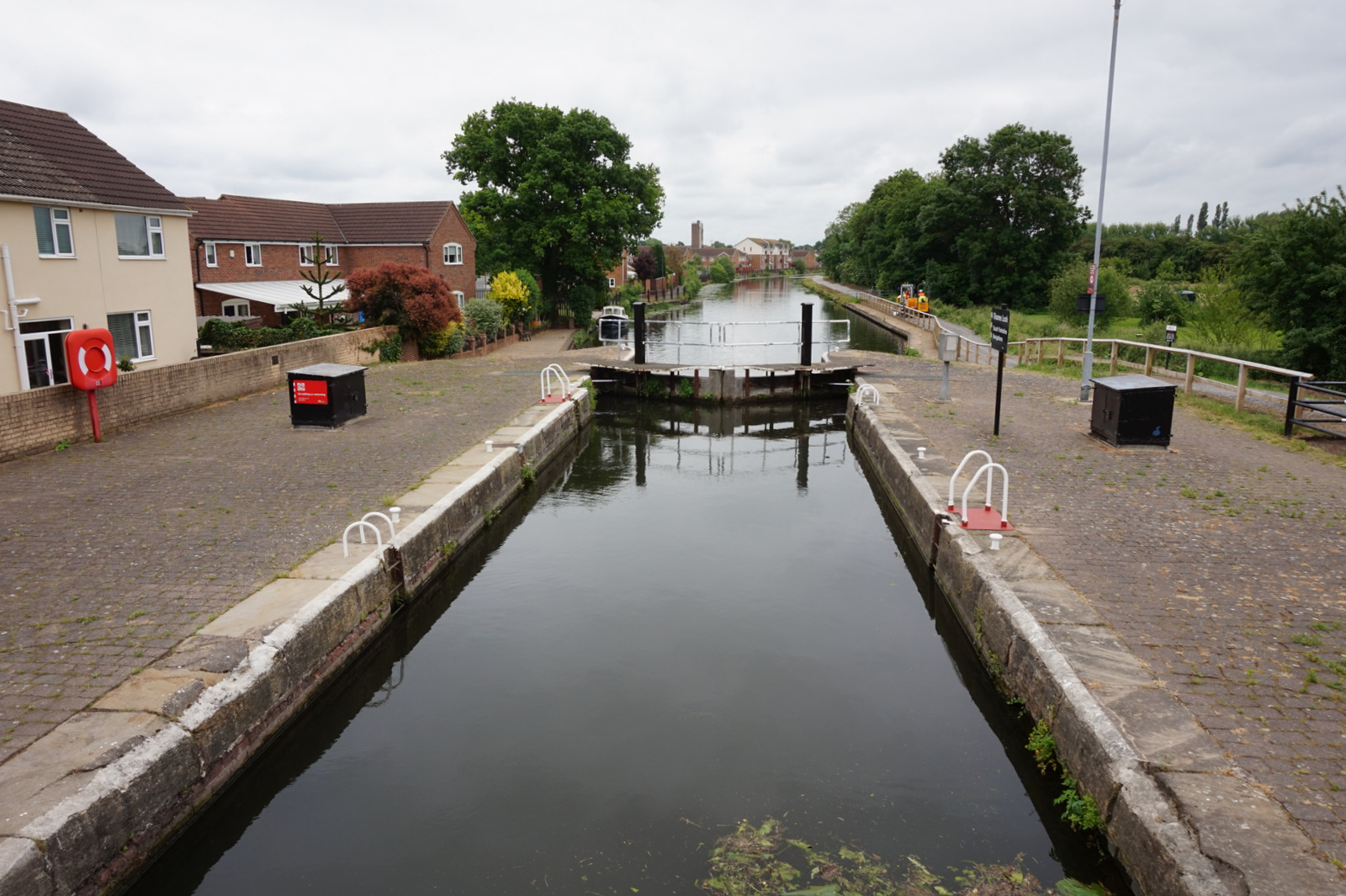
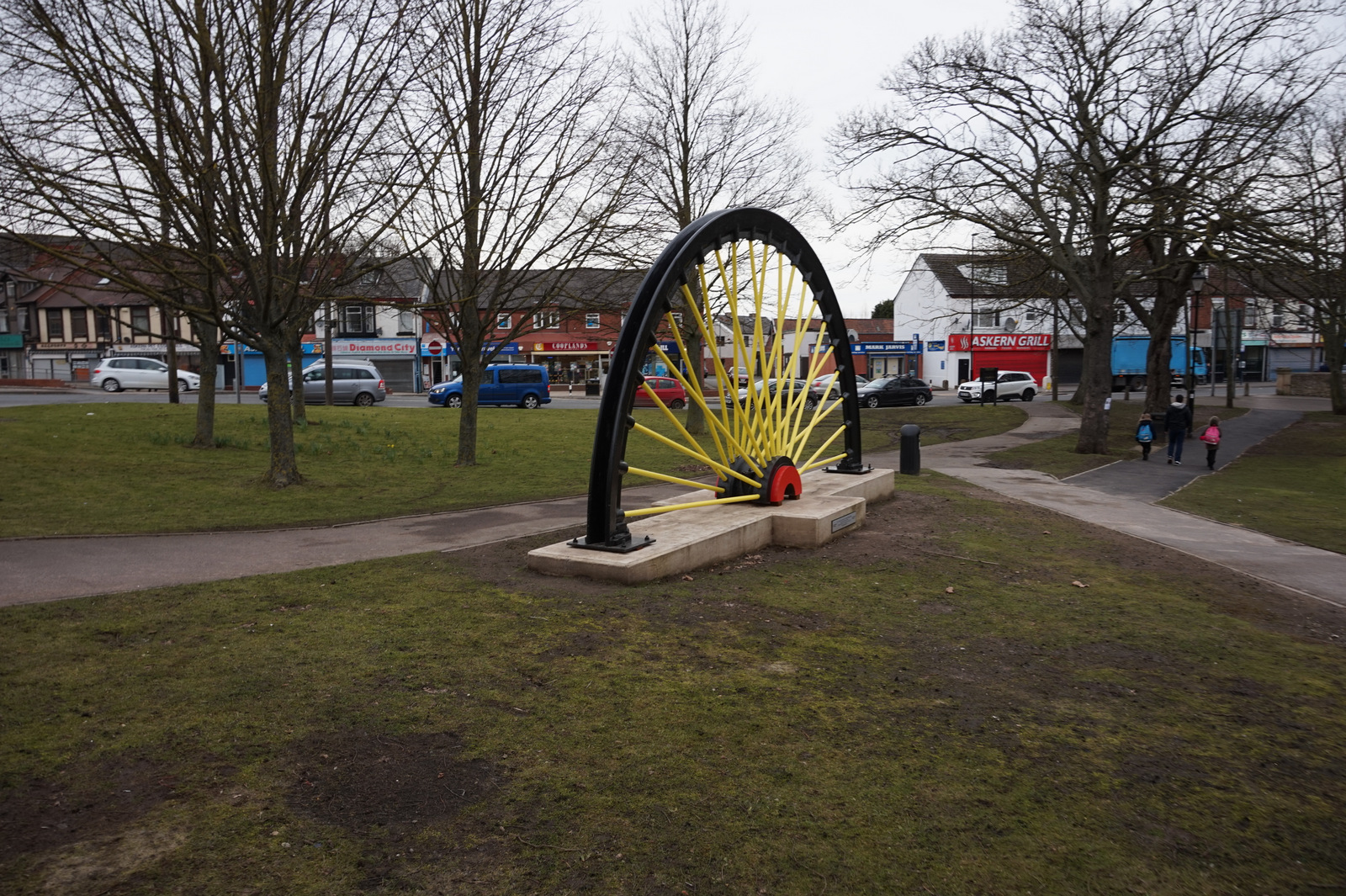
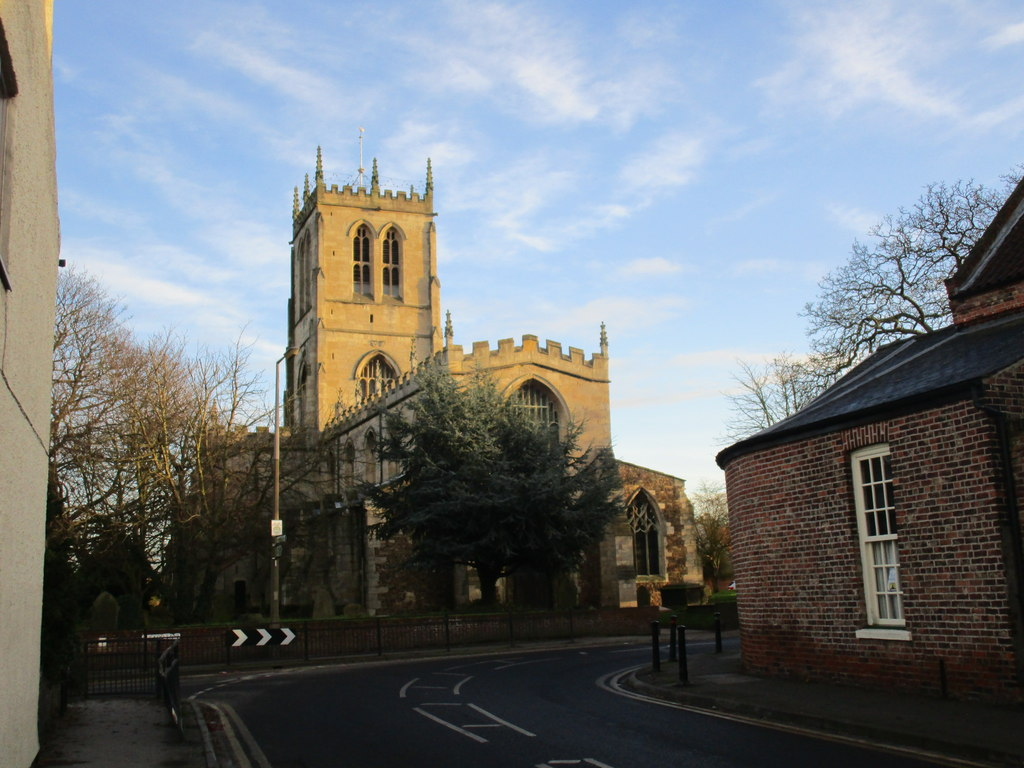
- From left to right; Top: Doncaster Minster and the River Don canal basin in Doncaster; Upper:Tickhill Market Place and Conisbrough from Conisbrough Castle; Lower: Church Walk in Bawtry and Thorne Lock in Thorne; Bottom: Askern Mining Wheel and St Lawrence's Church in Hatfield

- Doncaster shown within South Yorkshire
- Sovereign state: United Kingdom
- Constituent country: England
- Region: Yorkshire and the Humber
- Metropolitan county & City region: South Yorkshire
- Admin. HQ: Civic Office, Waterdale

Government
  - Type: City and metropolitan district council
  - Body: City of Doncaster Council
  - Leadership: Mayor and cabinet
  - Mayor: Ros Jones (L)
  - MPs: Lee Pitcher (L), Ed Miliband (L), Sally Jameson (L), John Healey (L)

Area
  - Total: 219 sq mi (568 km^{2})
  - Rank: 68th

Population (2025)
  - Total: 323,016
  - Rank: Ranked 42nd
  - Density: 1,470/sq mi (569/km^{2})

Ethnicity (2021)
  - Ethnic groups: List: 93.1% White; 2.9% Asian; 1.5% Mixed; 1.2% Black; 1.2% other

Religion (2021)
  - Religion: List: 50.9% Christianity; 39.8% no religion; 5.3% not stated; 2.2% Islam; 0.6% other; 0.5% Sikhism; 0.4% Hinduism; 0.3% % Buddhism; 0.1% Judaism
- Time zone: UTC+0 (Greenwich Mean Time)
  - Summer (DST): UTC+1 (British Summer Time)
- Area codes: 01302, 01405, 01709, 01977
- ISO 3166-2: GB-DNC
- ONS code: 00CE (ONS); E08000017 (GSS)
- Website: doncaster.gov.uk

The City of Doncaster is a metropolitan borough with city status in South Yorkshire, England. It is named after its principal settlement, Doncaster, and includes the surrounding suburbs of Doncaster as well as numerous towns and villages. The district has large amounts of countryside; at 219 square miles (570 km^{2}), it is the largest metropolitan borough in England by area.

The main settlement is the city of Doncaster, but the metropolitan borough covers a much larger area which includes the towns of Askern, Bawtry, Conisbrough, Edlington, Hatfield, Mexborough, Stainforth, Thorne, and Tickhill. As well as some notable villages such as Adwick le Street, Arksey, Barnby Dun, Carcroft, Denaby, Finningley, Kirk Sandall, Rossington, Thorpe in Balne and Warmsworth.

Doncaster borders North Yorkshire to the north, the East Riding of Yorkshire to the north-east, North Lincolnshire to the east, Bassetlaw in Nottinghamshire to the south-east, Rotherham to the south-west, Barnsley to the west, and Wakefield, West Yorkshire, to the north-west. It is part of the Yorkshire and the Humber region.

The borough was created on 1 April 1974, under the Local Government Act 1972, as a merger of the former County Borough of Doncaster, the urban districts of Adwick le Street, Bentley with Arksey, Conisbrough, Mexborough, and Tickhill, Doncaster and Thorne rural districts, and the parish of Finningley from East Retford Rural District and small parts of the parish of Harworth from Worksop Rural District from Nottinghamshire.

== Population statistics ==
According to the 2011 census, the population of the Metropolitan Borough of Doncaster is 302,400.

With approximately 110,000 inhabitants, the city of Doncaster itself contains around a third of the population of the entire borough. Around half of the borough's population reside within Doncaster's urban area (approximately 160,000).

Verified population statistics per ward from the 2001 census are shown as:

Doncaster population
Ward	Population	Households
Adwick	16,142	6,220
Armthorpe	16,977	6,495
Askern	11,414	4,293
Balby	14,336	5,514
Bentley Central	12,168	4,665
Bentley North Road	11,606	4,728
Bessacarr	13,652	5,425
Central	11,481	5,144
Conisbrough	14,894	5,837
Edlington & Warmsworth	12,291	4,641
Hatfield	15,048	5,630
Intake	10,994	4,417
Mexborough	15,282	6,281
Richmond	13,471	5,308
Rossington	12,647	4,705
South East	16,880	6,247
Southern Parks	14,439	5,520
Stainforth	15,447	5,825
Thorne	17,057	6,380
Town Field	11,131	4,587
Wheatley	11,497	4,877
Doncaster Total	288,854	112,739

== Elected mayor ==
A referendum was held in 2001, to decide if a directly elected mayor should be appointed. The first mayor, Martin Winter, representing the Labour Party, was elected in 2002 and successfully defended his post in 2005.

In 2009 the English Democrat candidate, Peter Davies, won the election for mayor. In January 2013 Davies left the English Democrats citing "a big influx of new members (of the English Democrats) joining from the British National Party". In the May 2013 mayoral election he was defeated by Labour's Ros Jones.

== Borough council ==
The council as a whole has been dominated by the Labour Party traditionally, but in the 2004 local elections, they lost overall control of the council (though they retained more councillors than any other single party). Labour regained overall control at the 2010 local elections.

== 2010 Audit Commission report and central government intervention ==
In January 2010, the Audit Commission initiated a corporate governance inspection of Doncaster Council. This followed the sudden resignation of the Chief executive leading to a conflict between the mayor and council over the appointment of a successor. The Commission felt that this, along with evidence that the council had not been well run for 15 years, was leading to a loss of public confidence.

The Commission's report was issued in April 2010. It found that Doncaster was a dysfunctional authority and that there were three factors preventing the council from providing good governance:

- The councillors' attempts to undermine the authority of the mayor and cabinet. There was evidence that councillors had never accepted the mayoral system and tried to use their overview and scrutiny powers to frustrate the mayor's policy objectives. In February 2010, the council had rejected the mayor's budget and voted in favour of their own proposals.
- The lack of effective leadership shown by the mayor and cabinet. The mayor was described as "not averse to provocative and inflammatory statements" and it was felt that he "does not always act in a way which demonstrates the need for an elected mayor to lead his authority and represent all the people in Doncaster".
- The failure of chief officers to deliver effectively services. Some senior officers were found to acquiesce in the councillors' misuse of scrutiny powers. There was also a lack of trust and impartiality.

On the recommendations of the commission, the Secretary of State for Communities and Local Government, John Denham, used powers to appoint an acting chief executive and an advisory board to oversee the council. A Doncaster Recovery Board, comprising four appointed commissioners and seven other members including the mayor and chief executive held its first quarterly meeting on 10 September 2010.

== Places ==
Settlements in the Borough of Doncaster include:

The ten largest settlements of the Borough of Doncaster

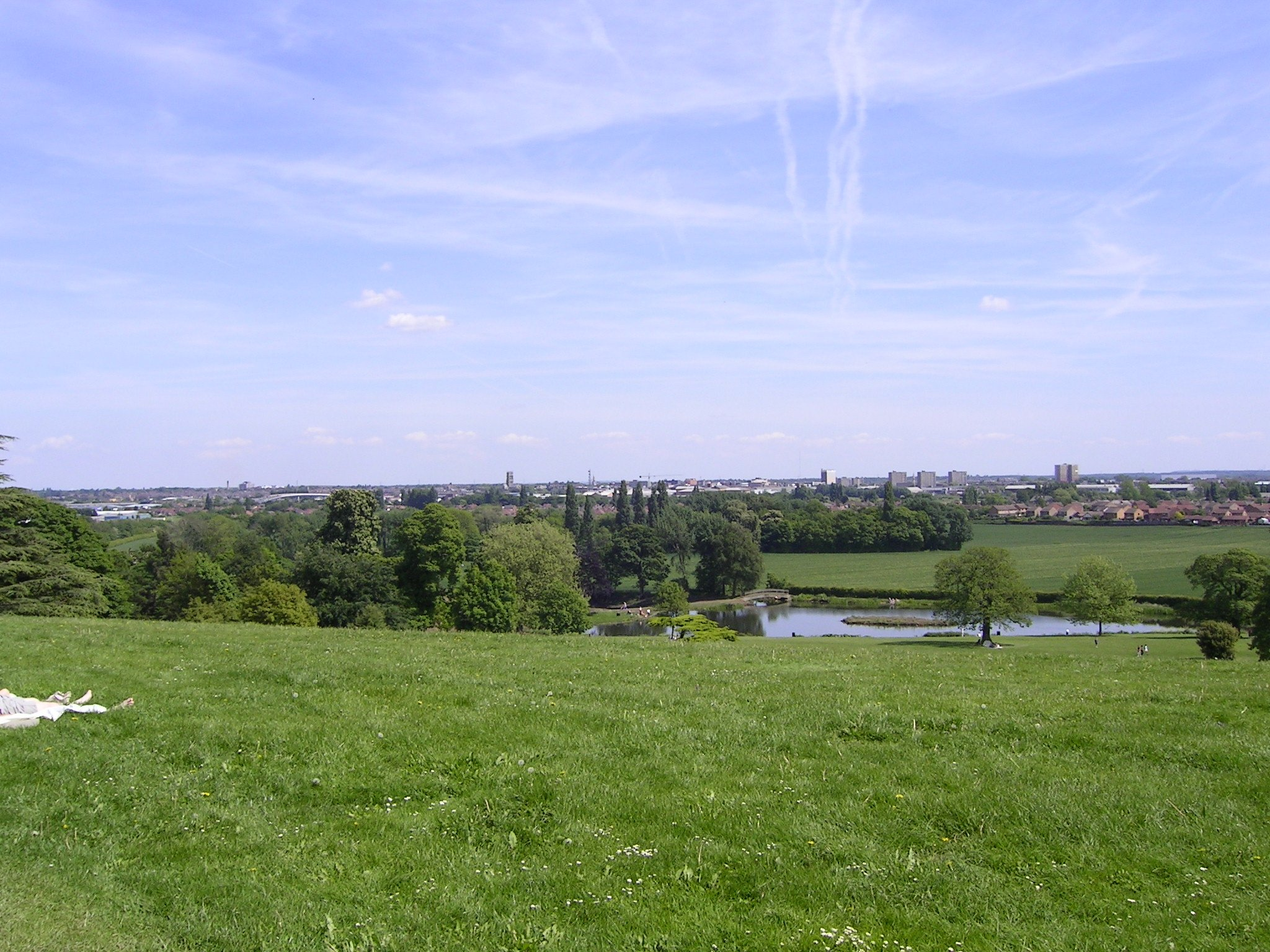
View from Cusworth Hall towards Doncaster

- Adwick le Street, Almholme, Arksey, Armthorpe, Askern, Auckley, Austerfield
- Balby, Barnburgh, Barnby Dun, Bawtry, Belle Vue, Bentley, Bessacarr, Blaxton, Braithwaite, Braithwell, Branton, Brodsworth, Burghwallis
- Cadeby, Campsall, Cantley, Carcroft, Clayton, Clifton, Conisbrough, Cusworth
- Denaby, Doncaster, Dunscroft, Dunsville
- Edenthorpe, Edlington
- Fenwick, Finningley, Fishlake
- Hampole, Harlington, Hatfield, Hatfield Woodhouse, Hayfield, Haywood, Hexthorpe, Highfields, Hickleton, High Levels, High Melton, Hooton Pagnell, Hyde Park
- Intake
- Kirk Sandall, Kirk Bramwith
- Lakeside, Lindholme, Loversall
- Marr, Mexborough, Micklebring, Moorends, Moss
- New Rossington, Norton
- Owston
- Rossington
- Scawsby, Scawthorpe, Shaftholme, Skelbrooke, Skellow, Sprotbrough, Stainforth, Stainton, Stancil, Sykehouse
- Thorne, Thorpe in Balne, Tickhill, Tilts, Toll Bar, Town Moor
- Wadworth, Warmsworth, West Bessacarr, Wheatley, Wheatley Hills, Wilsic, Woodlands

== Media ==
In terms of television, the area is served by BBC Yorkshire and ITV Yorkshire broadcasting from the Emley Moor transmitter.

Radio stations that can be received in Doncaster are Sine FM 102.6 (serving central districts of around 100,000 households in FM stereo), TMCR 95.3 (which serves Northeast Doncaster and other areas in FM stereo), Doncaster Radio (covering Doncaster and Bassetlaw), Capital Yorkshire, Heart Yorkshire, Greatest Hits Radio South Yorkshire, Hits Radio South Yorkshire and BBC Radio Sheffield. Although the above stations can be received within various areas of Doncaster, the only stations actually owned by Doncaster-based companies are Sine FM 102.6 and TMCR 95.3.

The borough is also the base of Nova Productions who produce the syndicated TV series Walks Around Britain.

== Freedom of the Borough ==
The following people and military units have received the Freedom of the Borough of Doncaster.

=== Individuals ===
- 8 July 1751: John Dawnay, 4th Viscount Downe, British Politician.
- 8 July 1751: Charles Watson-Wentworth, 2nd Marquess of Rockingham, British Prime Minister.
- 8 July 1751: John Manners, Marquess of Granby, British Army Officer.
- 23 September 1806: Prince of Wales.
- 23 September 1806: Duke of Clarence.
- 17 September 1822: Duke of Sussex
- 15 September 1829: Arthur Wellesley, 1st Duke of Wellington, British Army Officer and Later Prime Minister.
- 14 August 2017: Lance Bombardier Ben Parkinson, British Paratrooper wounded in Afghanistan.
- 25 February 2019: Tony Sockett, Former Mayor of Doncaster.
- 22 March 2019: Yvonne Woodcock, Mayor of Doncaster 1998–1999.
- 22 March 2022: James Coppinger, Footballer for Doncaster Rovers 2004–2021.
- 13 July 2023: Graham Kirkham, Baron Kirkham, British Businessman and Politician.

=== Military Units ===
- The King's Own Yorkshire Light Infantry: 1945.
- RAF Finningley: 1975.
- The Rifles: 8 September 2007.
- The Coldstream Guards: 15 July 2021.

== See also ==
- Listed buildings in Doncaster
