= South Yorkshire Fire and Rescue =

Local emergency services organisation in England

Operational area
- Country: England
- County: South Yorkshire

Agency overview
- Chief Fire Officer: Chris Kirby

Facilities and equipment
- Stations: 21

Website
- www.syfire.gov.uk

South Yorkshire Fire and Rescue is the statutory fire and rescue service for the area of South Yorkshire, England. The service covers the areas of Barnsley, Doncaster, Rotherham and Sheffield. In 2020, Chris Kirby was appointed its Chief Fire Officer.

== Performance ==
Every fire and rescue service in England and Wales is periodically subjected to a statutory inspection by His Majesty's Inspectorate of Constabulary and Fire & Rescue Services (HMICFRS). The inspections investigate how well the service performs in each of three areas. On a scale of outstanding, good, requires improvement and inadequate, South Yorkshire Fire and Rescue Service was rated as follows:

HMICFRS Inspection South Yorkshire
Area	Rating 2018/19	Rating 2021/22	Description
Effectiveness	Good	Requires improvement	How effective is the fire and rescue service at keeping people safe and secure from fire and other risks?
Efficiency	Good	Requires improvement	How efficient is the fire and rescue service at keeping people safe and secure from fire and other risks?
People	Good	Good	How well does the fire and rescue service look after its people?

== Fire stations ==
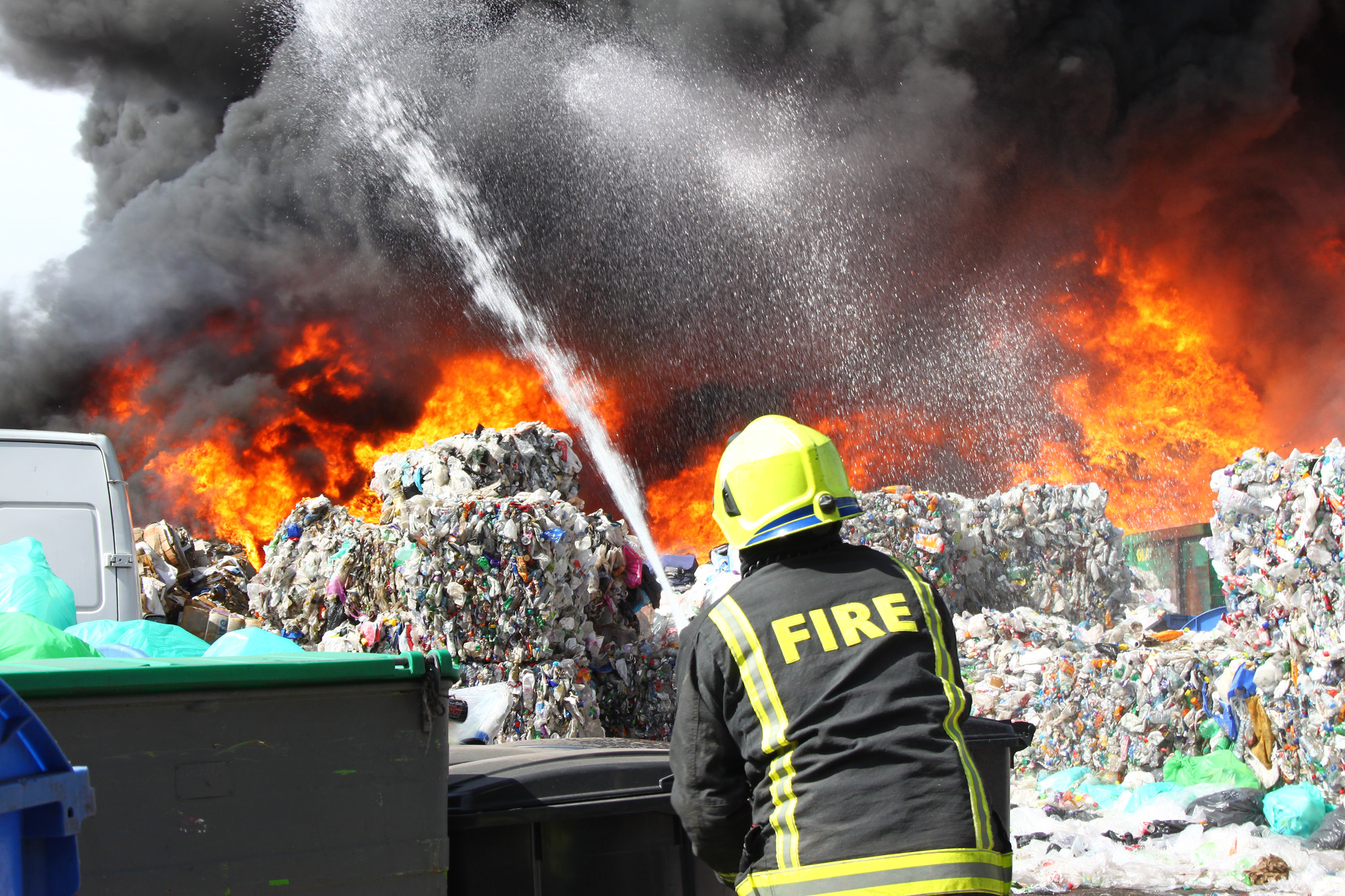
South Yorkshire Fire and Rescue officer fighting a fire at a reclamation yard in July 2013

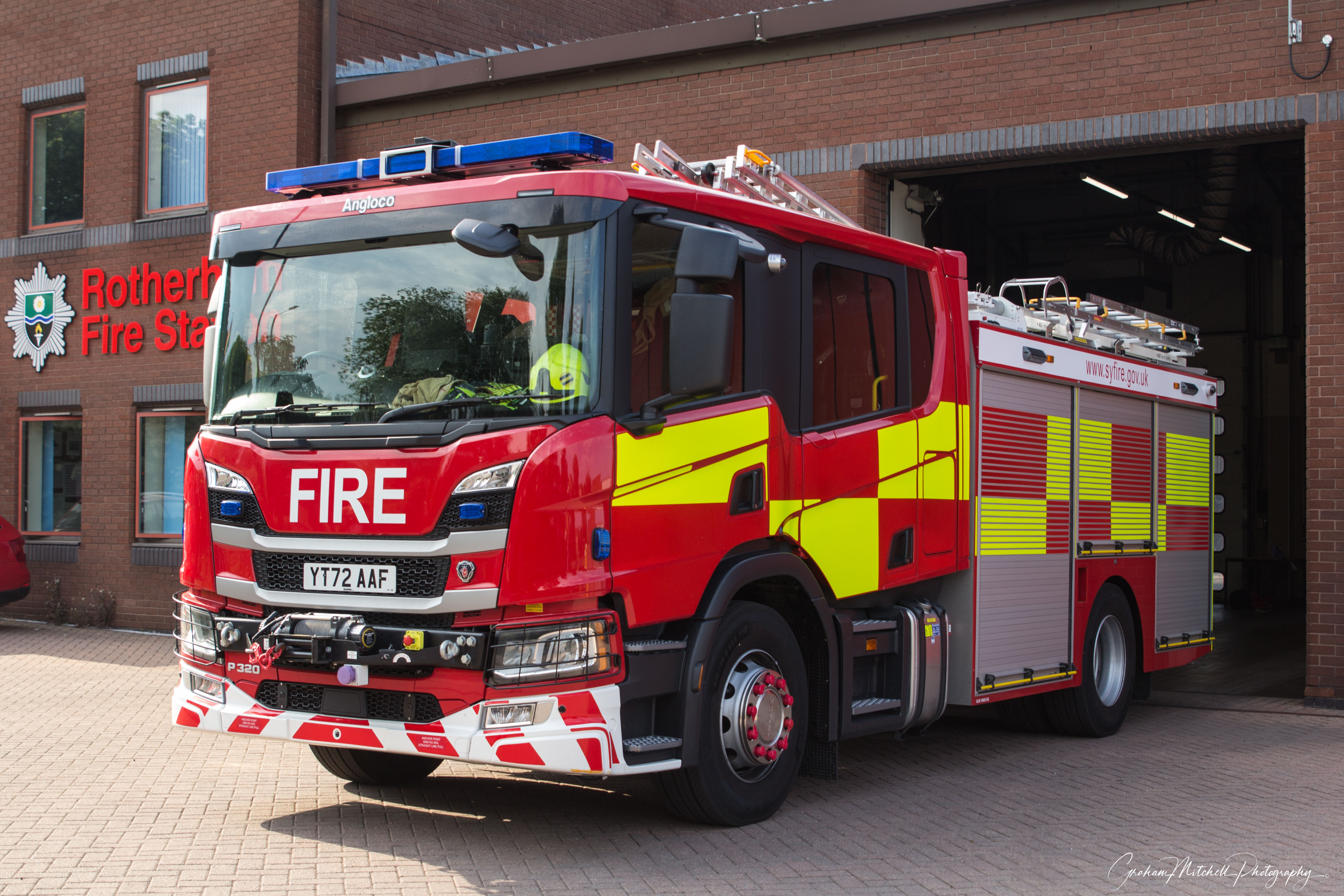
A South Yorkshire Fire and Rescue appliance at Rotherham fire station

Currently the service operates 21 fire stations across the county, which are staffed on a wholetime basis, wholetime and day-crewed, wholetime and retained, or retained-only. with the remaining four staffed by on-call retained firefighters. The stations are grouped into four districts: Barnsley, Doncaster, Rotherham and Sheffield.

== See also ==
- Fire service in the United Kingdom
- Fire apparatus
- Firefighter
- FiReControl
- List of British firefighters killed in the line of duty
