= Doncaster =

City in South Yorkshire, England

Coordinates: 53°31′22″N 1°07′57″W

- City
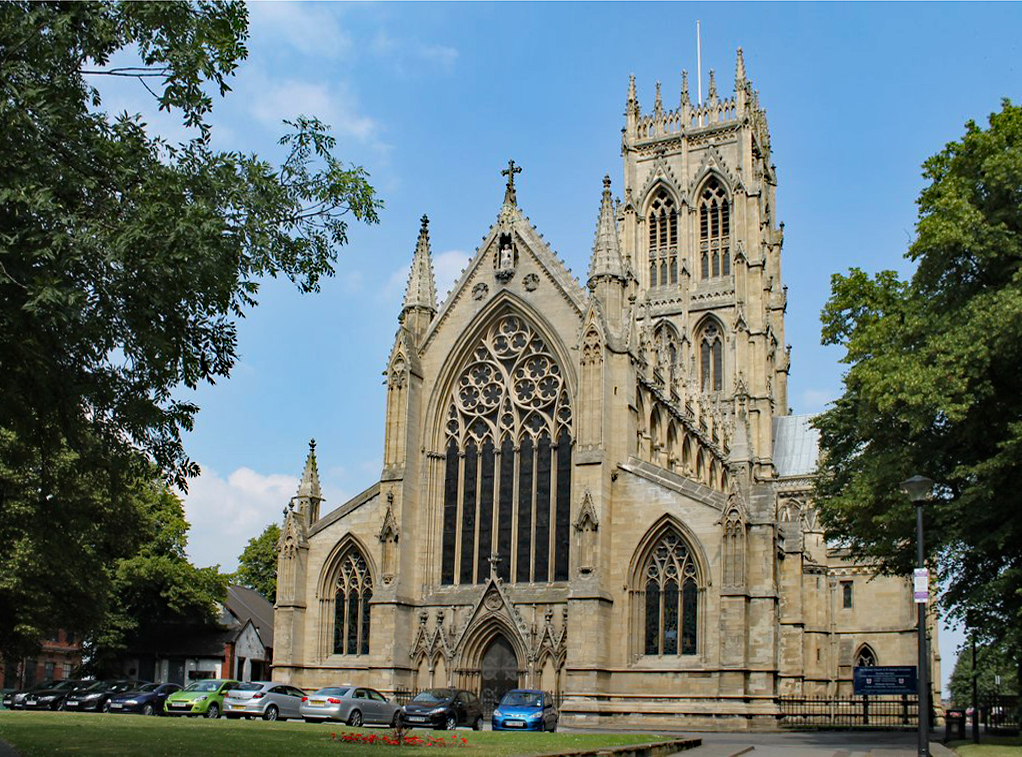
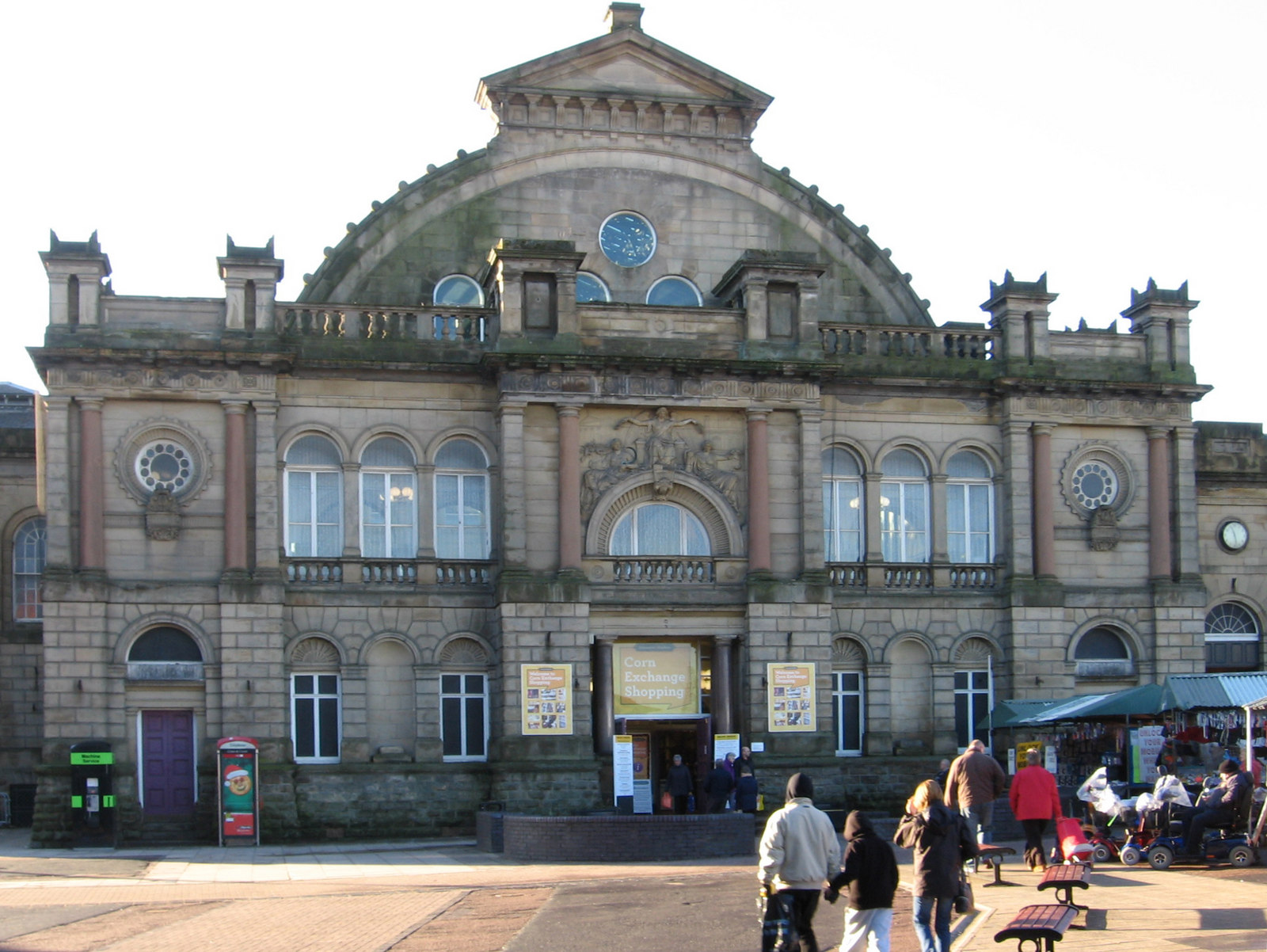
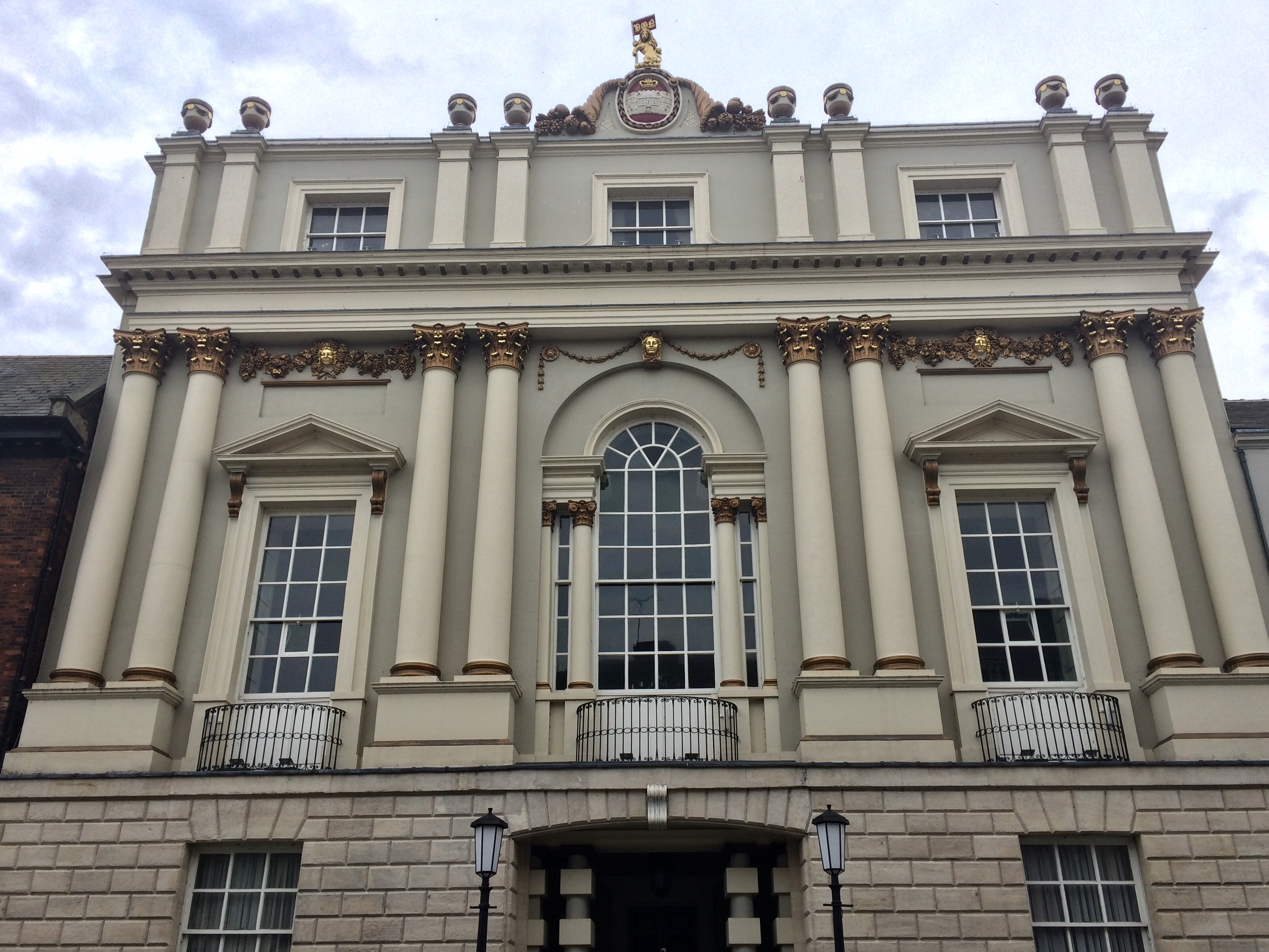
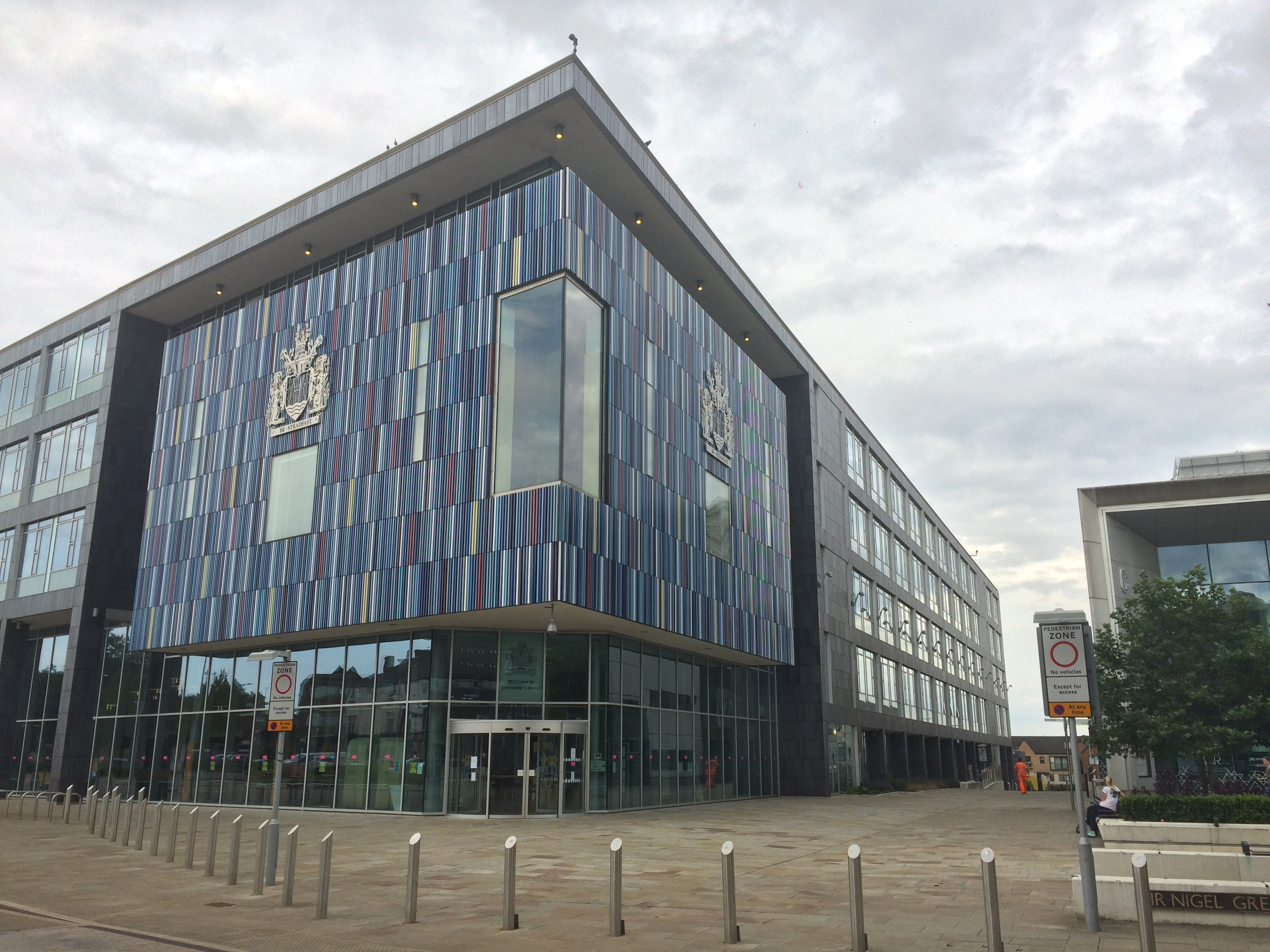
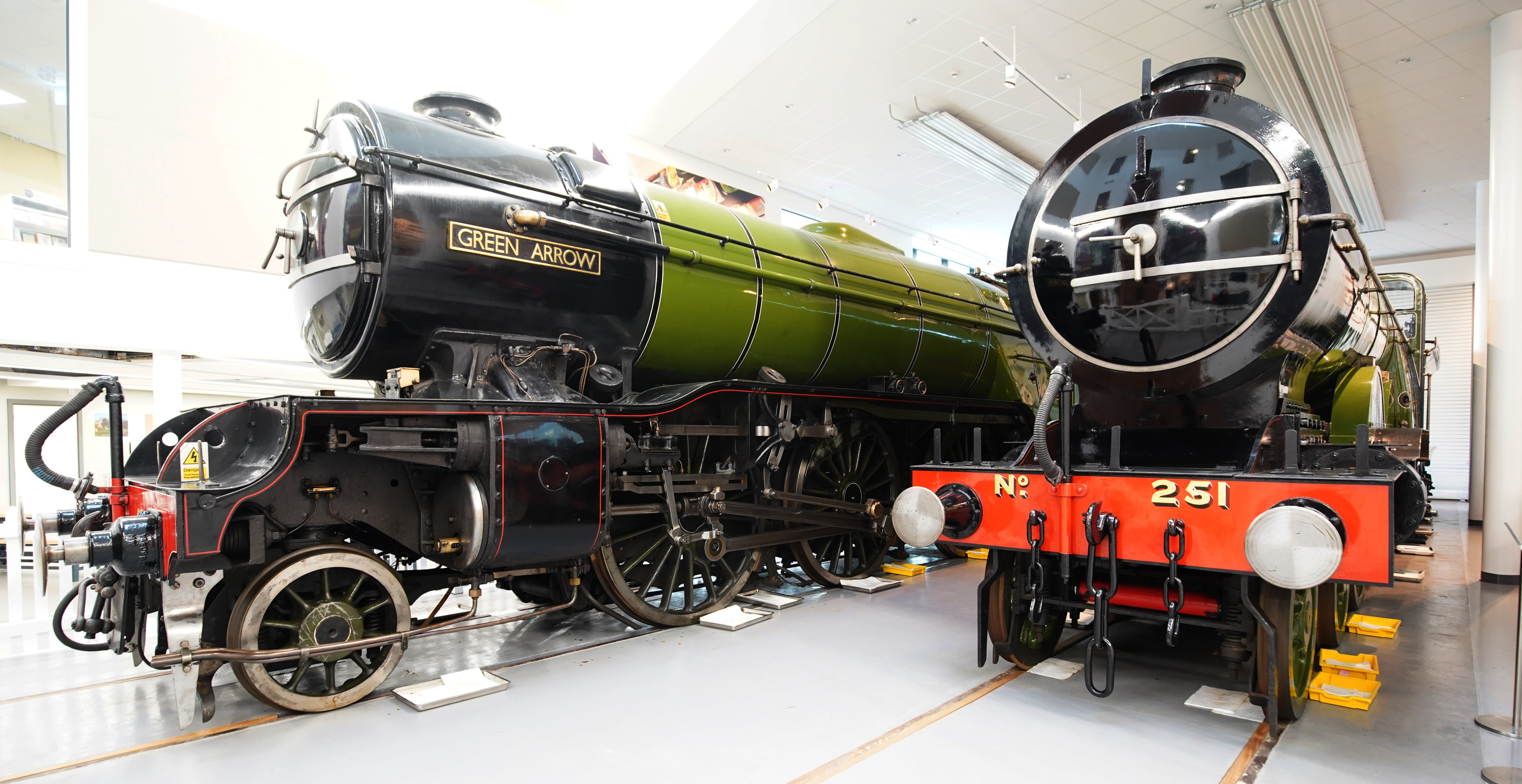
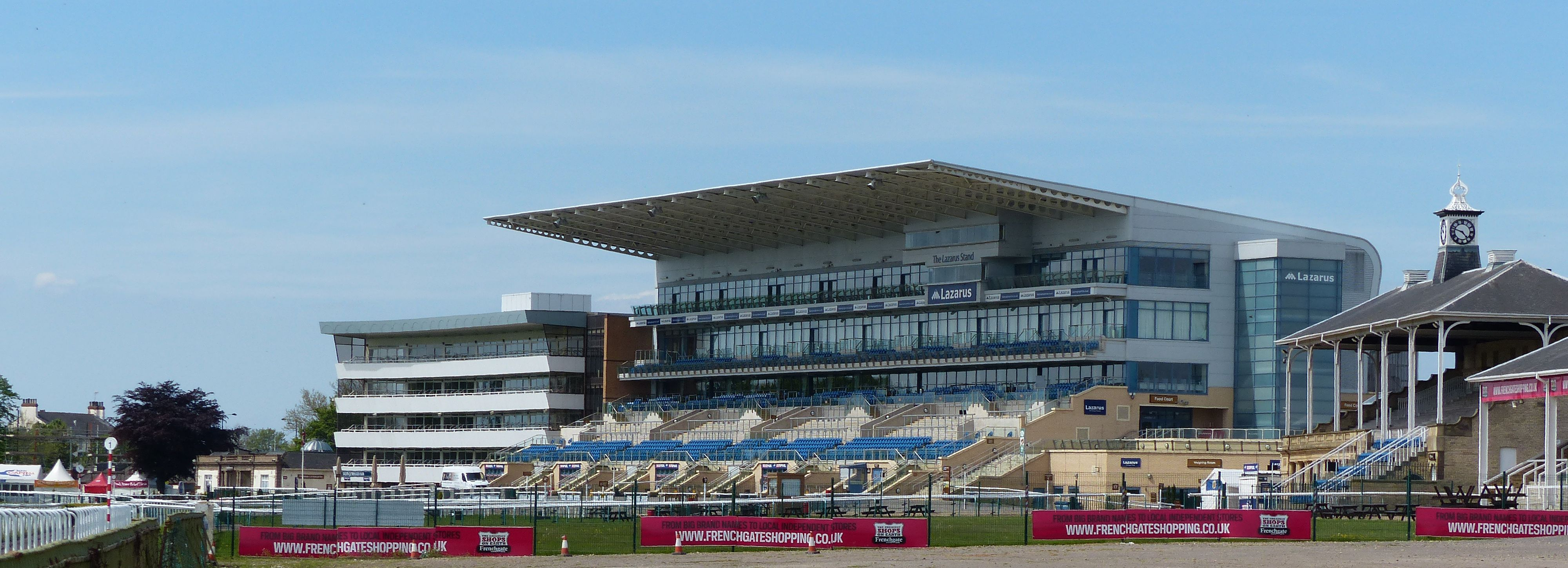
- Minster and Parish Church of St George Corn Exchange Mansion House Civic Office DANUM Centre Doncaster Racecourse

- Location within City of Doncaster Location within South Yorkshire
- Area: 43.5 km^{2} (16.8 sq mi)
- Population: 87,455 (Built up area, 2021) (Note: 323,016 (Borough, 2025))
  - Density: 2,010/km^{2} (5,200/sq mi)
- OS grid reference: SE575032
- Metropolitan borough: City of Doncaster
- Metropolitan county: South Yorkshire
- Region: Yorkshire and the Humber
- Country: England
- Sovereign state: United Kingdom
- Areas of the city: List: Arksey; Armthorpe; Balby; Barnby Dun; Bentley; Bessacarr; Cantley; Cusworth; Edenthorpe; Edlington; Hexthorpe; Intake; Kirk Sandall; Long Sandall; Scawsby; Scawthorpe; Sprotbrough; Warmsworth; Wheatley; Wheatley Hills
- Post town: DONCASTER
- Postcode district: DN1-DN12
- Dialling code: 01302
- Police: South Yorkshire
- Fire: South Yorkshire
- Ambulance: Yorkshire
- UK Parliament: Doncaster Central; Doncaster East and the Isle of Axholme; Doncaster North; Rawmarsh and Conisbrough
- Website: doncaster.gov.uk

Doncaster (/ˈdɒŋkəstər, -kæs-/ DONK-ə-stər, DONK-ast-ər) is a city in South Yorkshire, England. Named after the River Don, it is the administrative centre of the City of Doncaster metropolitan borough, and is the second largest settlement in South Yorkshire after Sheffield. Noted for its racing and railway history, it is situated in the Don Valley on the western edge of the Humberhead Levels and east of the Pennines. It had a population of 87,455 at the 2021 census, whilst its built-up area had a population of 160,220, and the wider metropolitan borough had a population of 308,100.

Adjacent to Doncaster to its east is the Isle of Axholme in Lincolnshire, which contains the towns of Haxey, Epworth and Crowle, and directly south is Harworth Bircotes in Nottinghamshire. Also, within the city's vicinity are Barnsley, Wakefield, Pontefract, Selby, Goole, Scunthorpe, Gainsborough, Retford, Worksop and Rotherham, to which Doncaster is linked by road and rail.

As part of the Platinum Jubilee Civic Honours, Doncaster received city status by Letters Patent. A ceremony to confer city status took place at Mansion House on 9 November 2022 as part of a tour of Yorkshire by King Charles III and Queen Camilla.

== History ==
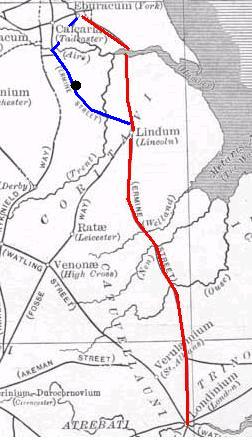
Ermine Street's alternative route: Eboracum (York) to Lagecium (Castleford), 21 miles, to Danum (Doncaster), 16 miles, to Agelocum (Littleborough), 21 miles, to Lindum (Lincoln), 13 miles. A spur connected Danum with Calcaria (near Tadcaster).

=== Roman ===
Possibly inhabited earlier, Doncaster grew up on the site of a Roman fort of the 1st century CE, at a crossing of the River Don. The 2nd-century Antonine Itinerary and early-5th-century Notitia Dignitatum (Register of Dignitaries) called the fort Danum. The first section of road to the Doncaster fort had probably been built since the early 50s, while a route through the north Derbyshire hills was opened in the later 1st century, possibly by Governor Gn. Julius Agricola in the late 70s. Doncaster provided an alternative land route between Lincoln and York, while the main route Ermine Street involved parties breaking up to cross the Humber in boats. As this was not always practical, the Romans saw Doncaster as an important staging post. The Roman road appears on two routes recorded in the Antonine Itinerary. The itinerary includes the same section of road between Lincoln and York and lists three stations between these two coloniae. Routes 7 and 8 (Iter VII & VIII) are entitled "the route from York to London".

Several areas of intense archaeological interest have been identified in the town, although many such as St Sepulchre Gate remain hidden under buildings. The Roman fort is thought to have lain on the site now taken by St George's Minster, beside the River Don. The Doncaster garrison units are named in a Register produced near the end of Roman rule in Britain: it was the home of the Crispinian Horse, presumably named after the tribes living near Crispiana in Pannonia Superior (near present-day Zirc in western Hungary), but possibly after Crispus, son of Constantine the Great, who was headquartered there while his father was based in nearby York. The Register names the unit as under the command of the "Duke of the Britons".

In 1971 the Danum shield, a rectangular Roman shield dating to the 1st or 2nd century CE, was recovered from the site of the Danum fort.

An inscribed altar, dedicated to the Matres by Marcus Nantonius Orbiotalus, was found at St Sepulchre Gate in 1781. This was donated to the Yorkshire Museum in 1856.

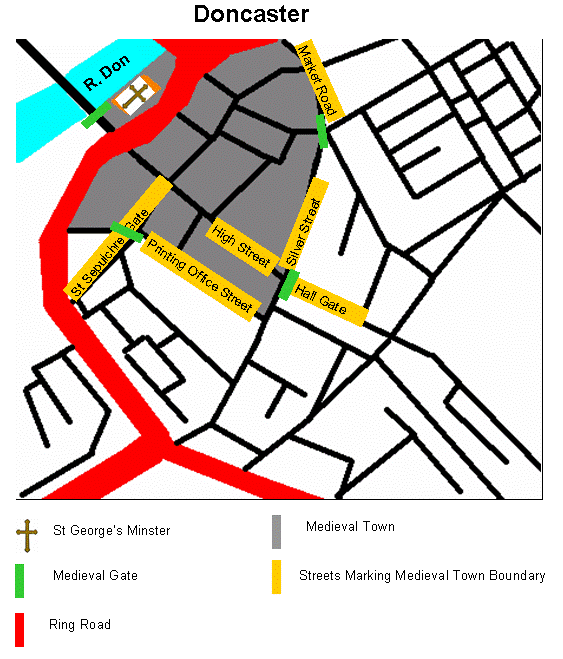
Map showing the boundary of the fortified Medieval township of Doncaster with four Gates

=== Medieval ===
Doncaster is generally identified with Cair Daun listed as one of 28 British cities in the 9th-century History of the Britons traditionally ascribed to Nennius. (Note: Bishop Ussher, cited in Newman's life of Saint German) It was certainly an Anglo-Saxon burh, and in that period received its present name: "Don-" (Old English: Donne) from the settlement and river and "-caster" (-ceaster) from an Old English version of the Latin castra (military camp; fort). It was mentioned in the 1003 will of Wulfric Spott. Shortly after the Norman Conquest, Nigel Fossard refortified the town and built Conisbrough Castle. By the time of Domesday Book, Hexthorpe in the wapentake of Strafforth was said to have a church and two mills. The historian David Hey says these facilities represent the settlement at Doncaster. He also suggests that the street name Frenchgate indicates that Fossard invited fellow Normans to trade in the town. Doncaster was ceded to Scotland in the Treaty of Durham and never formally returned to England.

With the 13th century, Doncaster matured into a busy town. In 1194 King Richard I granted it national recognition with a town charter. It suffered a disastrous fire in 1204, from which it slowly recovered. At the time, buildings were built of wood, and open fireplaces used for cooking and heating.

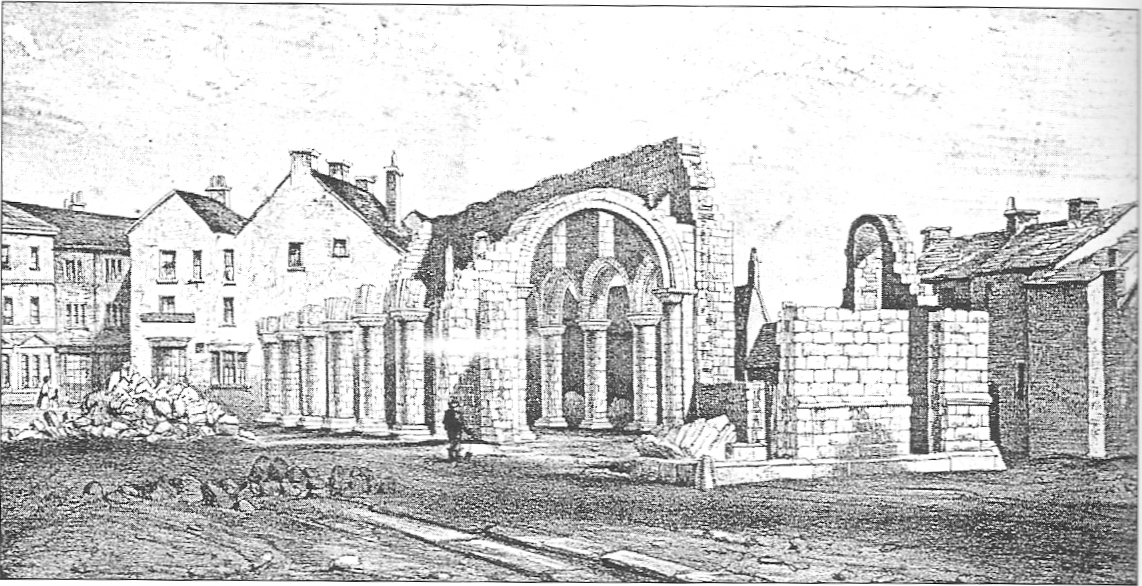
Norman church of St Mary Magdalene, at demolition in 1846

In 1248, a charter was granted for Doncaster Market to be held in the area surrounding the Church of St Mary Magdalene, which was built in Norman times. In the 16th century, the church was adapted for use as the town hall. It was finally demolished in 1846. Some 750 years on, the market continues to operate, with busy traders located under cover, at the 19th-century Doncaster Corn Exchange building (1873). The Corn Exchange was much rebuilt in 1994 after a major fire. During the 14th century, numerous friars arrived in Doncaster who were known for their religious enthusiasm and preaching. In 1307 the Franciscan friars (Greyfriars) arrived, as did Carmelites (Whitefriars) in the mid-14th century. Other major medieval features included the Hospital of St Nicholas and the leper colony of the Hospital of St James, a moot hall, a grammar school and a five-arched stone town bridge with a chapel dedicated to Our Lady of the Bridge. By 1334, Doncaster was the wealthiest town in southern Yorkshire and the sixth in Yorkshire as a whole, even boasting its own banker. By 1379, it was recovering from the Black Death, which had reduced its population to 1,500. In October 1536, the Pilgrimage of Grace ended in Doncaster. This rebellion led by the lawyer Robert Aske commanded 40,000 Yorkshire people against Henry VIII, in protest at the Dissolution of the Monasteries. Many of Doncaster's streets are named with the suffix "-gate", after the old Danish word gata, meaning street. In medieval times, craftsmen or tradesmen with similar skills tended to live in the same street. Baxter is an ancient word for baker: Baxtergate was the bakers' street. Historians believe that Frenchgate may be named after French-speaking Normans who settled there.

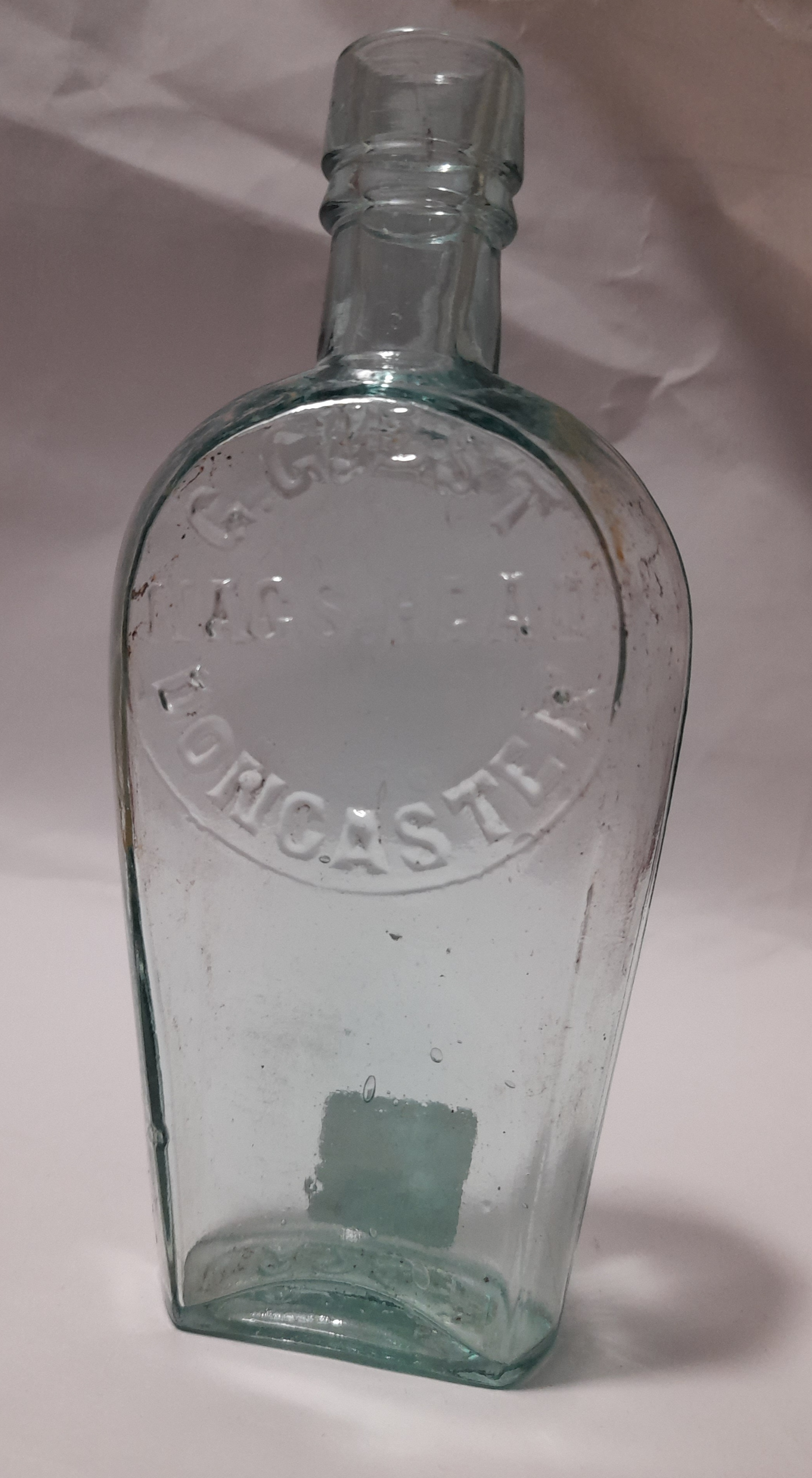
C19th spirit flask, Nags Head, 33 & 35 St Sepulchre Gate

The medieval township is known to have been protected by earthen ramparts and ditches, with four substantial gates as entrances to the town. These were located at Hall Gate, St Mary's Bridge (old), St Sepulchre Gate and Sunny Bar. Today the gates at Sunny Bar are commemorated by huge "Boar Gates"; similarly, the entrance to St Sepulchre Gate is commemorated by white marble "Roman Gates". The boundary of the town mainly extended from the Don along a route known now Market Road, Silver Street, Cleveland Street and Printing Office Street.

=== Modern ===
Population of Doncaster District taken from census data

Access to the town was restricted and some officeholders secured charters to collect tolls. In 1605, King James I granted to William Levett of Doncaster, brother of York merchant Percival Levett, the right to levy tolls at Friar's and St Mary's bridges. Having served as mayors and aldermen of Doncaster, the Levetts probably believed they could control a monopoly. In 1618 the family began enforcing it, but by 1628 the populace revolted. Capt. Christopher Levett, Percival's son, petitioned Parliament to enforce the tolls, but Parliament disagreed, calling them "a grievance to the subjects, both in creation and execution," and axing the Levett monopoly. Doncaster's Levet Road is named after the family, as are nearby hamlets of Hooton Levitt and the largely abandoned Levitt Hagg, where much of the town's early limestone was quarried.

During the 16th and 17th centuries, Doncaster continued to expand, but it suffered several outbreaks of plague between 1562 and 1606. Each struck down significant numbers of victims.

During the First English Civil War, King Charles I marched by Bridgnorth, Lichfield and Ashbourne to Doncaster, where on 18 August 1645 he was met by numbers of Yorkshire gentlemen who had rallied to his cause. On 2 May 1664, Doncaster was rewarded with the title of Free Borough as a way for the King (Charles I's son, King Charles II) to express gratitude for the allegiance.

Doncaster was connected to the rail network in 1848 and a plant and carriage works for Great Northern Railway was constructed in the town in 1853.The Doncaster Carr rail depot was opened in 1876.

The area to the east of Doncaster started developing settlements where coal miners lived from the 1850s onwards, exploiting coal near Barnsley. One such settlement is Deneby.

Doncaster and surrounding settlements became part of the West Riding of Yorkshire in 1899. Under the Local Government Act 1972 it was drawn into a new metropolitan borough in 1974 and became part of the new county of South Yorkshire.

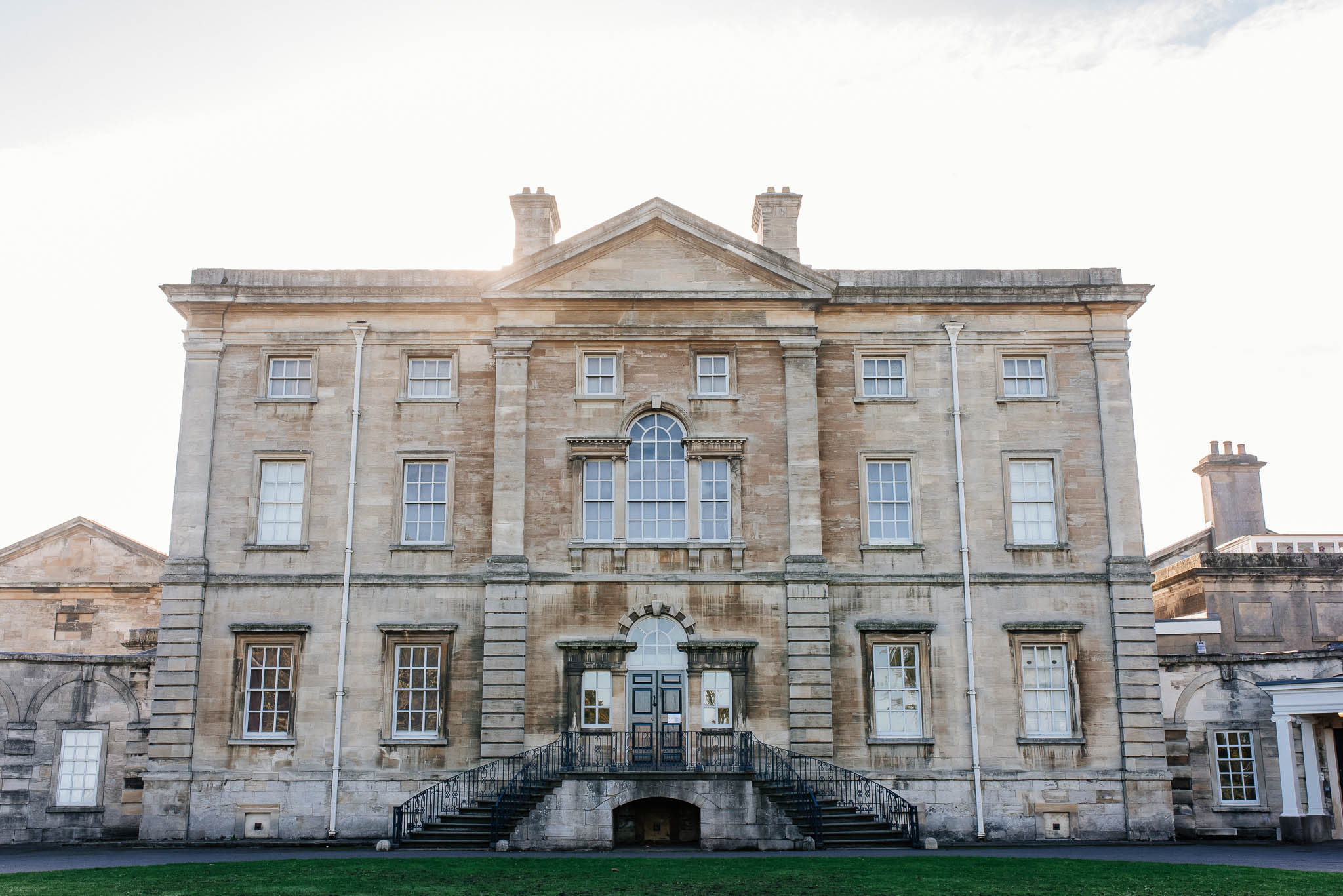
Cusworth Hall front

Doncaster has traditionally been prosperous within the wapentake of Stafford and Tickhill. The borough was known for rich landowners and huge stately homes such as Brodsworth Hall, Cantley Hall, Cusworth Hall, Hickleton Hall, Nether Hall and Wheatley Hall (demolished 1934). This wealth appears in the luxurious, historic gilded 18th-century Mansion House in High Street. This land ownership developed over what is an ancient market place and large buildings were erected in the 19th century, including the Market Hall and Corn Exchange. The old Doncaster Guildhall in Frenchgate was designed by John Butterfield with a tetrastyle portico and completed in 1847: it was demolished in the redevelopment of the 1960s.

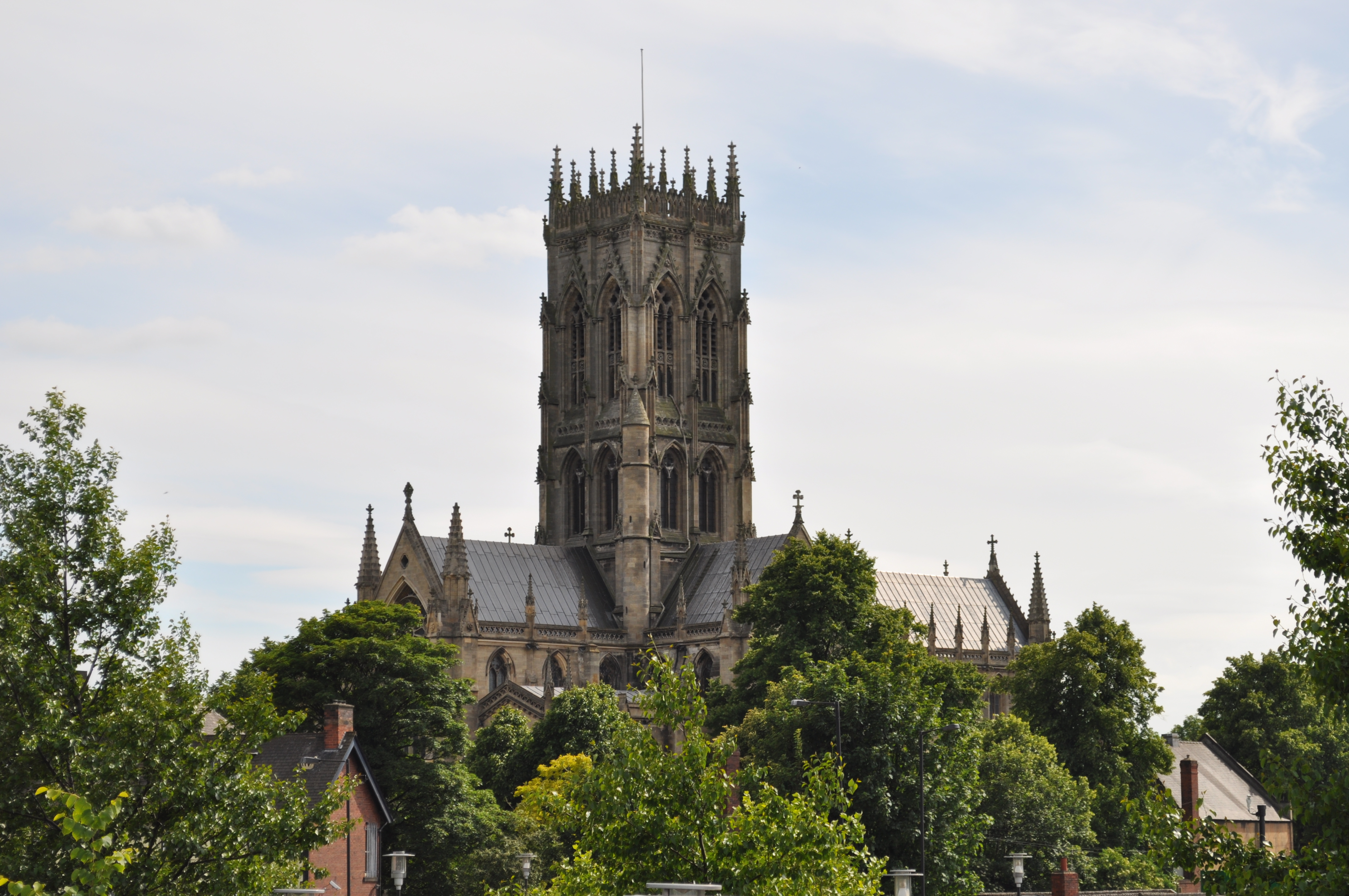
St George's Minster is a grade I listed building and was designed by Sir George Gilbert Scott in the 1850s.

Perhaps the most striking building to survive is St George's Minster, built in the 19th century and promoted from a parish church in 2004. Doncaster was already a communication centre by this time. It straddled the Great North Road or A1, gaining strategic importance, as this was the main route for traffic between London and Edinburgh.

== Governance and politics ==
=== National politics ===
Doncaster is represented in the House of Commons by three Members of Parliament (MPs). Sally Jameson represents Doncaster Central, Ed Miliband, the former Labour Party leader, represents Doncaster North, and Lee Pitcher represents the Doncaster East and the Isle of Axholme.

From 2023, the Don Valley constituency was renamed Doncaster East and the Isle of Axholme, and covers part of North Lincolnshire. A new Rawmarsh and Conisbrough constituency was created to cover the south-western suburbs of Doncaster and parts of Rotherham. Doncaster Central, while Doncaster North saw minor boundary changes.

In September 2014, UKIP held an annual party conference at Doncaster Racecourse. UKIP party leader Nigel Farage claimed that by holding the conference in Doncaster, UKIP were "now parking our tanks on the Labour Party's lawn", referring to Labour leader Ed Miliband's Doncaster North constituency. Shortly afterwards in the seat, at the 2015 general election, UKIP won 8,928 votes to Labour's 20,708. In the 2016 membership referendum, 69 per cent of Doncaster voted to leave the European Union.

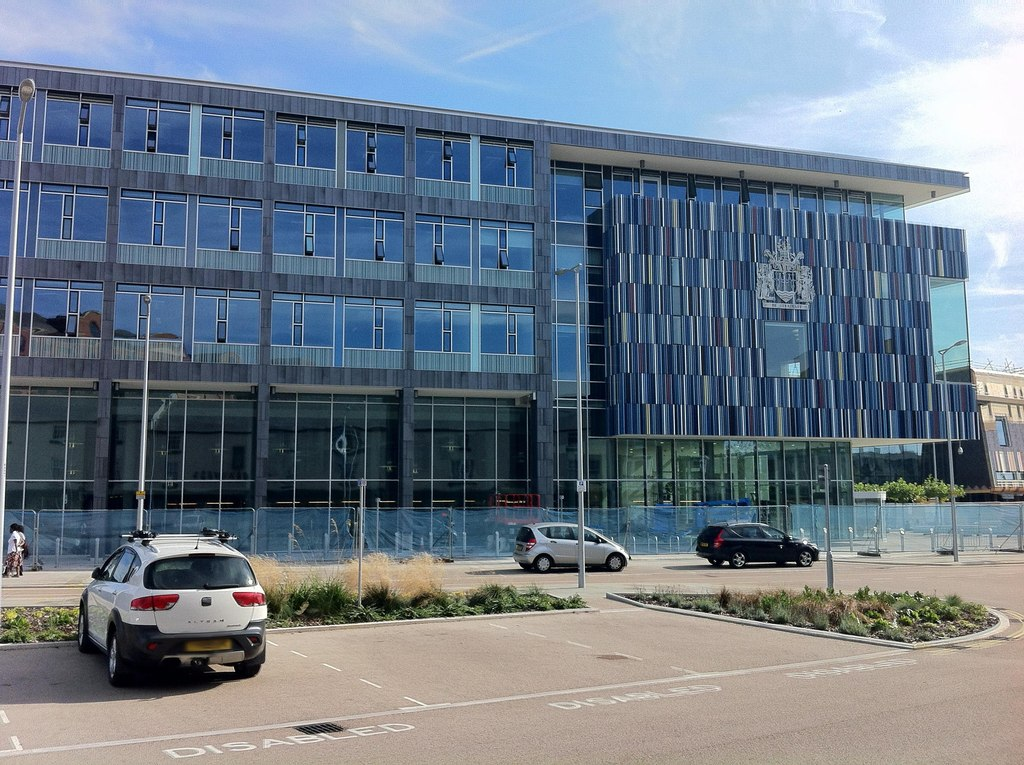
Doncaster Civic Office

=== Local politics ===
Doncaster forms part of the South Yorkshire Combined Authority, which elects a mayor every four years.

Additionally, the Metropolitan Borough of Doncaster is one of twelve districts in the United Kingdom to have a directly elected mayor, currently Ros Jones, who was re-elected in 2025.

=== City status ===
The local authority applied several times, unsuccessfully, for city status. Its borough population of greater than 300,000 is larger than that of many cities' such as Hull, Southampton and Newcastle. On 28 October 2021, Doncaster Metropolitan Borough Council announced its bid for Doncaster City for the Queen's Platinum Jubilee. This has been supported by the Doncaster Labour Group and the Doncaster Conservative Association. All three MPs for Doncaster expressed support for city status, with Don Valley's Nick Fletcher speaking for it in Parliament.

Alongside seven other areas, Doncaster was announced to have succeeded in its bid to gain city status on 20 May 2022 as part of the Platinum Jubilee of Elizabeth II. The city status applies to the whole metropolitan borough rather than just the built up area of Doncaster. Doncaster formally received the letters patent and became a city when a ceremony took place on 9 November 2022 as part of a royal visit.

=== Administrative history ===
Doncaster was an ancient parish, which was subdivided into six townships: Balby with Hexthorpe, Langthwaite with Tilts, Long Sandall, Loversall, Wheatley and a Doncaster township covering the central part of the parish, including the town. Such townships were also made civil parishes in 1866. Doncaster was also an ancient borough, with its earliest known charter dating from 1194. The borough just covered the Doncaster township, although it exerted some authority over a surrounding rural area known as the soke.

The borough was reformed to become a municipal borough in 1836 under the Municipal Corporations Act 1835, which standardised how most boroughs operated across the country. The borough boundaries were enlarged several times, notably in 1914 when it absorbed Balby with Hexthorpe and Wheatley. By 1927 the borough was considered large enough to run its own county-level services, and so it was made a county borough, independent from West Riding County Council.

The county borough was abolished in 1974 and replaced by the larger Metropolitan Borough of Doncaster, which also took in the abolished urban districts of Adwick le Street, Bentley with Arksey, Conisbrough, Mexborough, Tickhill, the rural districts of Doncaster and Thorne, and (from Nottinghamshire) the parish of Finningley and part of the parish of Harworth (the latter being added to the parish of Bawtry). The borough was raised to city status in 2022.

== Geography ==
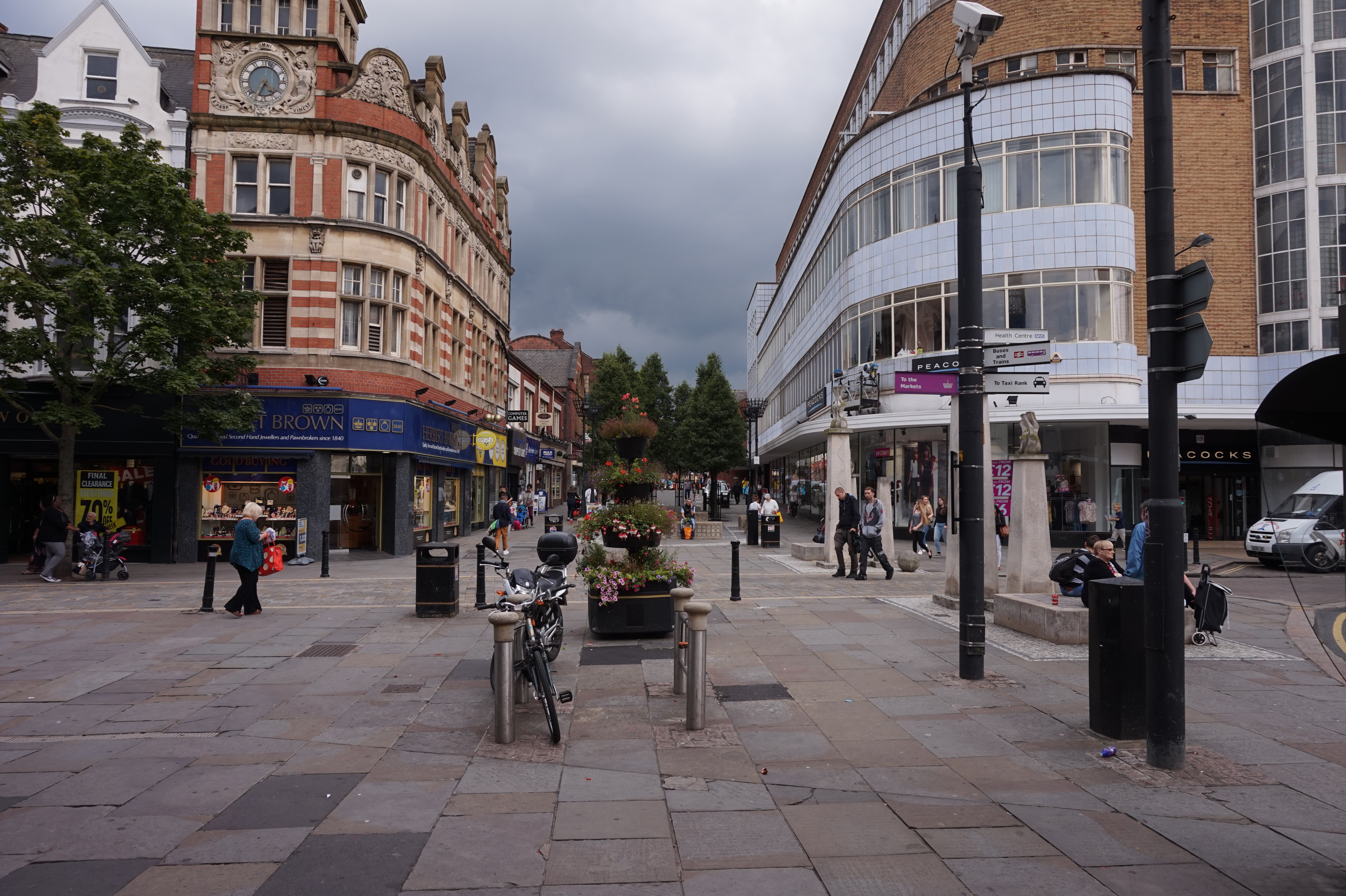
St Sepulchre Gate and Printing Office Street

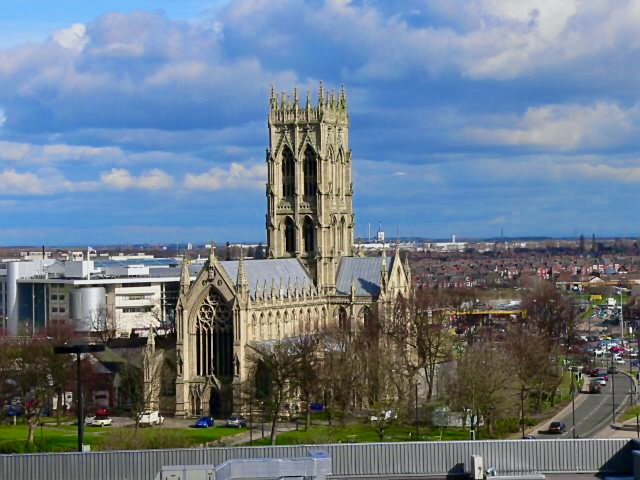
Doncaster skyline with St George's Minster in the foreground

=== Urban ===
Place	Distance	Direction	Relation
London	146 miles (235 km)	South	Capital city of the United Kingdom
Hull	36 miles (58 km)	East	Nearby city
Lincoln	32 miles (51 km)	South east	Nearby city
York	30 miles (48 km)	North	Nearby city; historic county town of Yorkshire
Wakefield	19 miles (31 km)	North west	Nearby city
Sheffield	17 miles (27 km)	South west	Largest city in county; within combined authority area
Barnsley	15 miles (24 km)	West	Within combined authority area
Rotherham	11 miles (18 km)	South west	Within combined authority area

Doncaster is the second largest settlement in South Yorkshire and the largest metropolitan district in England by area. It expanded dramatically in population with the development of coal mining. Closure of coal mines in the 1970s and early 1980s caused economic difficulties; the town then developed its service industry, drawing on the good communication links with the rest of the UK.

The Doncaster skyline is overlooked by the minster in the middle of the city. The Frenchgate Shopping Centre is in a similar position in the skyline, along with the Doncaster College Hub building.

After the old Doncaster College and surrounding buildings were demolished, the new Doncaster Civic Office designed by Cartwright Pickard was built for the City of Doncaster Council at a cost of £20 million and completed in 2012.

=== Topography ===
Doncaster lies in a lowland valley in southern Yorkshire. To the west are low rolling hills eventually reaching the Pennines. To the east are the low-lying Isle of Axholme and Humberhead Levels. The south is relatively low-lying, with a large forested area including Sherwood Forest in Nottinghamshire. The Vale of York lies to the north. The floodplains of the River Don lie to Doncaster's north-east; this area is regularly flooded, notably in 2007 and 2019.

=== Conservation ===
==== Nature reserves ====
Thorne and Hatfield Moors, east of Doncaster, is the largest area of low-lying peat bog in the United Kingdom. It is protected as a national nature reserve.

Potteric Carr, including Potteric Carr Nature Reserve, lies to the south.

==== Green belt ====
Doncaster is within a green belt that extends into the surrounding counties. First defined in 1966, the policy is controlled throughout the town by the local planning authority, City of Doncaster Council. It reduces urban sprawl, prevent areas in the conurbation from further convergence, protects outlying communities, encourages brownfield reuse, and protects nearby countryside by restricting development in the designated areas and imposing stricter conditions on permitted building.

It surrounds the side of the urban area west of the East Coast Line, preventing suburbs such as Sprotbrough, New Edlington, Old Edlington, Scawsby and New Rossington merging. As a result, open rural land can be very close to the town centre at some points (for example the wide undeveloped valley of the River Don is adjacent to the town centre), while at other points the urban sprawl rolls on for up to five miles. Another aim of the green belt is to encourage recreation and leisure interests, with rural landscape features, greenfield areas and facilities including the River Don and valley west of Hexthorpe; Hexthorpe Park; Cusworth Hall, museum and country park; Potteric Carr and Huxter Well Marsh; and the Trans Pennine Trail.

=== Climate ===
Doncaster has a maritime climate lacking extreme temperatures, like much of the British Isles. Its low elevation in the Don Valley, in the lee of the Pennines, and inland from the North Sea, mean daytime summer temperatures are no lower than parts of South East England, despite the more northerly location. The nearest weather station is RAF Finningley, now known as Doncaster Sheffield Airport, about 5.5 mi (8.9 km) to the south-east of Doncaster city centre and at a similar elevation.

The Doncaster area is about as far north as the 22 °C (72 °F) average July maximum temperature isotherm reaches. The nearby town of Bawtry, slightly further south, still holds the UK's September monthly record high temperature of 35.6 °C (96.1 °F), set in 1906. Typically, the warmest day of the year reaches 29.1 °C (84.4 °F) and 12 or 13 days report a daytime maximum of 25.1 °C (77.2 °F) or above.

The lowest known temperature is −13.5 °C (7.7 °F), set during December 1981. Online records only go back to 1960, and lower temperatures may have been recorded earlier. During the 1991–2020 period, an average of 38.1 nights of the year recorded an air frost.

Typically 113.6 days of the year report 1 mm or more of rainfall. Total annual precipitation is slightly above 580 mm (23 in), which is comparable to the driest parts of the UK, due to Doncaster's location in the rain shadow of the Pennines.

Climate data for Doncaster (DSA) (Note: Weather station is located 6 miles (10 km) from the Doncaster town centre.), elevation: 12 m (39 ft), 1991–2020 normals, extremes 1960–2000
Month	Jan	Feb	Mar	Apr	May	Jun	Jul	Aug	Sep	Oct	Nov	Dec	Year
Record high °C (°F)	14.5 (58.1)	17.9 (64.2)	23.6 (74.5)	22.7 (72.9)	28.4 (83.1)	32.1 (89.8)	32.2 (90.0)	35.5 (95.9)	27.3 (81.1)	27.7 (81.9)	18.5 (65.3)	15.5 (59.9)	35.5 (95.9)
Mean daily maximum °C (°F)	7.6 (45.7)	8.4 (47.1)	10.9 (51.6)	13.7 (56.7)	16.9 (62.4)	19.8 (67.6)	22.3 (72.1)	21.9 (71.4)	18.9 (66.0)	14.6 (58.3)	10.4 (50.7)	7.8 (46.0)	14.4 (58.0)
Daily mean °C (°F)	4.5 (40.1)	5.0 (41.0)	6.9 (44.4)	9.2 (48.6)	12.0 (53.6)	15.0 (59.0)	17.2 (63.0)	16.9 (62.4)	14.4 (57.9)	11.0 (51.8)	7.2 (45.0)	4.7 (40.5)	10.3 (50.6)
Mean daily minimum °C (°F)	1.4 (34.5)	1.5 (34.7)	2.8 (37.0)	4.6 (40.3)	7.1 (44.8)	10.2 (50.4)	12.1 (53.8)	11.8 (53.2)	9.9 (49.8)	7.3 (45.1)	3.9 (39.0)	1.6 (34.9)	6.2 (43.1)
Record low °C (°F)	−13.3 (8.1)	−10.3 (13.5)	−9.3 (15.3)	−5.4 (22.3)	−3.5 (25.7)	−0.6 (30.9)	3.2 (37.8)	3.7 (38.7)	−1.1 (30.0)	−3.6 (25.5)	−7.5 (18.5)	−13.5 (7.7)	−13.5 (7.7)
Average precipitation mm (inches)	42.3 (1.67)	35.5 (1.40)	32.0 (1.26)	42.5 (1.67)	40.9 (1.61)	64.6 (2.54)	55.6 (2.19)	54.3 (2.14)	51.8 (2.04)	56.7 (2.23)	56.5 (2.22)	49.6 (1.95)	582.3 (22.92)
Average precipitation days (≥ 1.0 mm)	10.0	8.9	8.4	8.4	8.6	9.8	9.8	9.4	8.6	10.1	11.3	10.4	113.7
Mean monthly sunshine hours	59.8	80.9	117.6	158.5	195.6	176.8	192.5	178.8	137.7	99.9	64.6	53.9	1,516.6
Source 1: Met Office
Source 2: KNMI

== Demography ==
Population of Doncaster 1801–2015
1801	1811	1821	1831	1841	1851	1861	1871	1881	1891	1901	1911	1921	1931	1939	1951	1961	1981	2011	2021
5,697	6,935	8,544	10,801	10,455	12,052	16,406	18,768	21,139	25,933	28,932	30,516	54,064	63,316	73,527	82,054	86,322	76,042	109,805	308,000

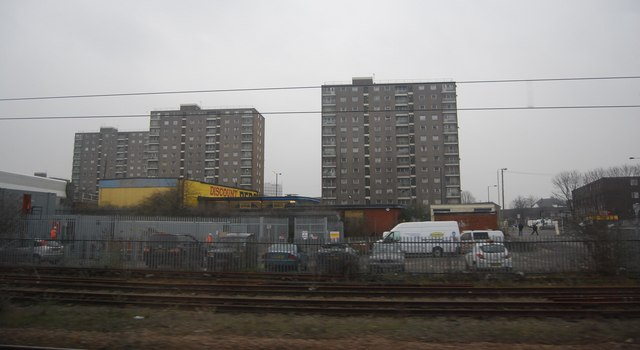
Tower blocks in Doncaster

In the 2011 census the town of Doncaster (identified as the "built-up area subdivision") had a population of 109,805, while the wider "Built-up area" had a population of 158,141. The Metropolitan Borough of Doncaster had a 2011 population of 302,402, while a 2021 estimate was 308,000.

The 2011 census figure makes Doncaster's population very slightly larger than that of Rotherham (pop 109,691).

Doncaster compared 2011	Doncaster	Metropolitan Borough of Doncaster
White British	84.9%	91.8%
Asian	5.3%	2.5%
Black	1.3%	0.8%

== Economy ==
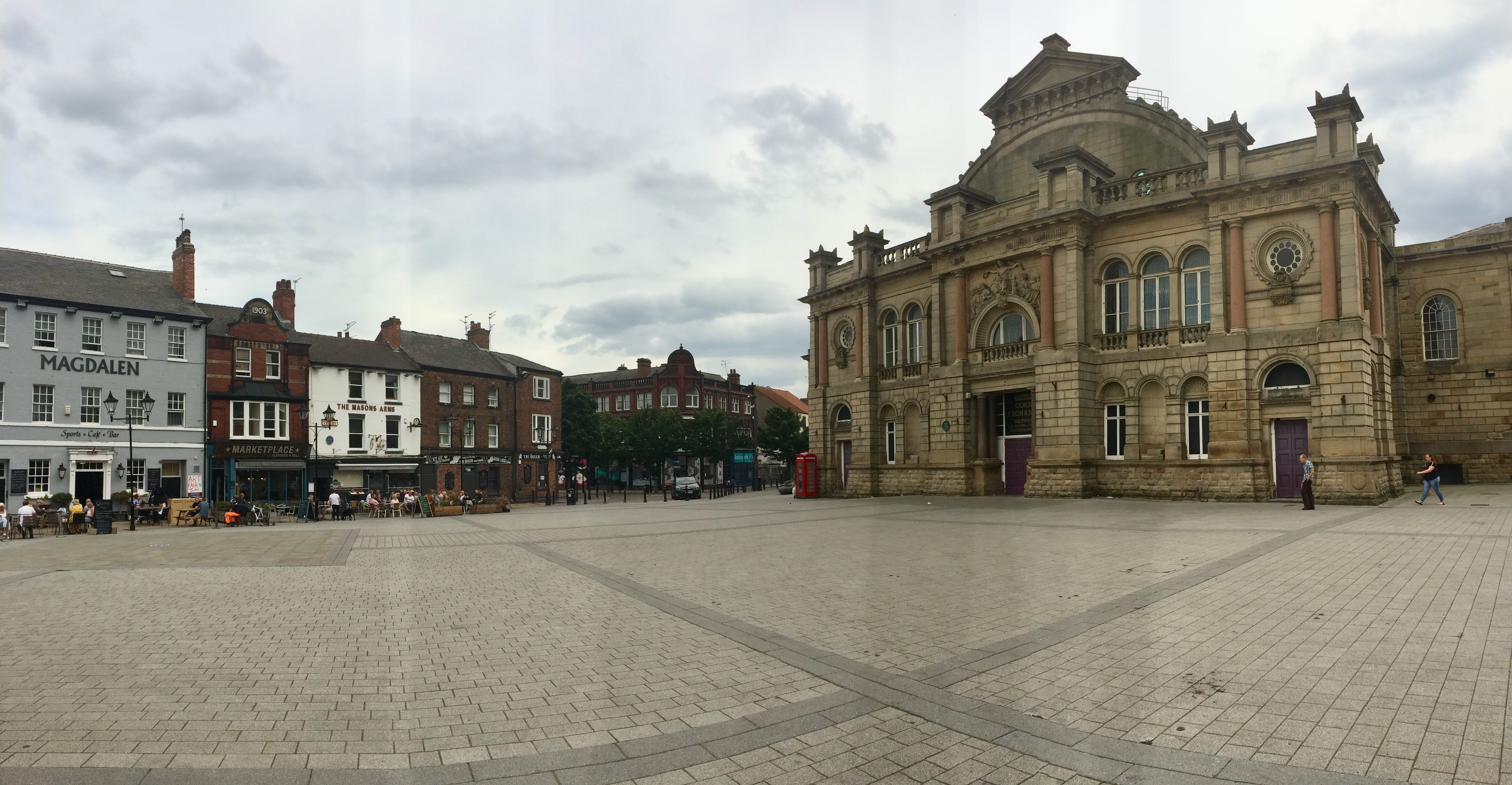
Doncaster Market Place Panoramic

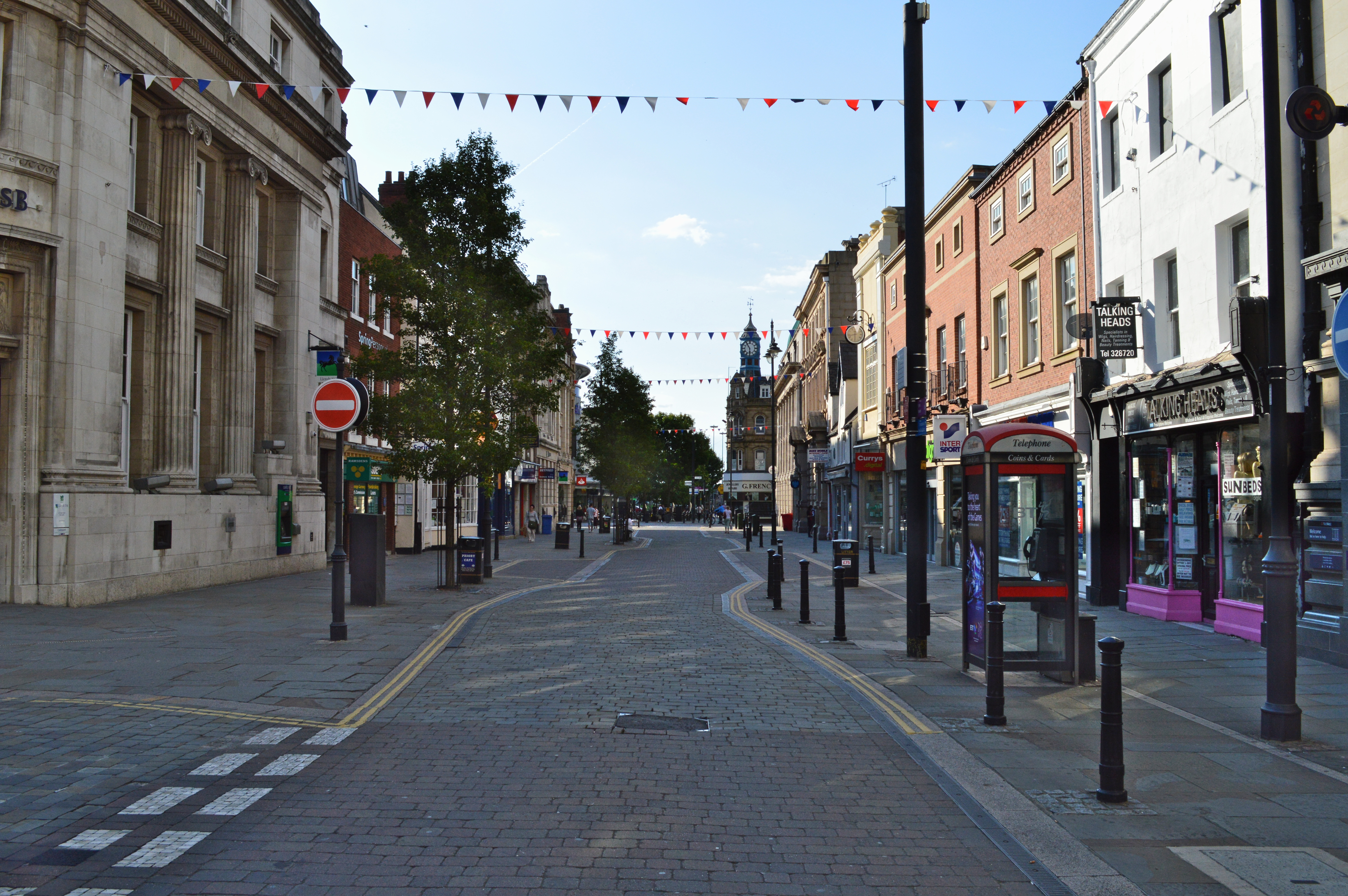
The High Street in Doncaster city centre

Doncaster emerged as an industrial centre in the late 18th to 20th centuries. Its communications, particularly its waterways, meant that it became extremely busy and experienced migration to its centre. Underneath Doncaster lies a huge natural resource by way of deep seam coal.

=== Distribution centres ===
Doncaster's proximity to major urban centres and motorway/rail infrastructure gives it a number of major distribution centres, including the 420-acre Doncaster International Railport, which dispatches goods to Europe. It also has large warehousing and logistic capabilities for retailers such as Next, Tesco, IKEA, Amazon.com, Lidl and Faberge. A marked proportion of fresh and frozen goods for northern supermarkets is dispatched by road from Doncaster.

=== Regeneration initiatives ===
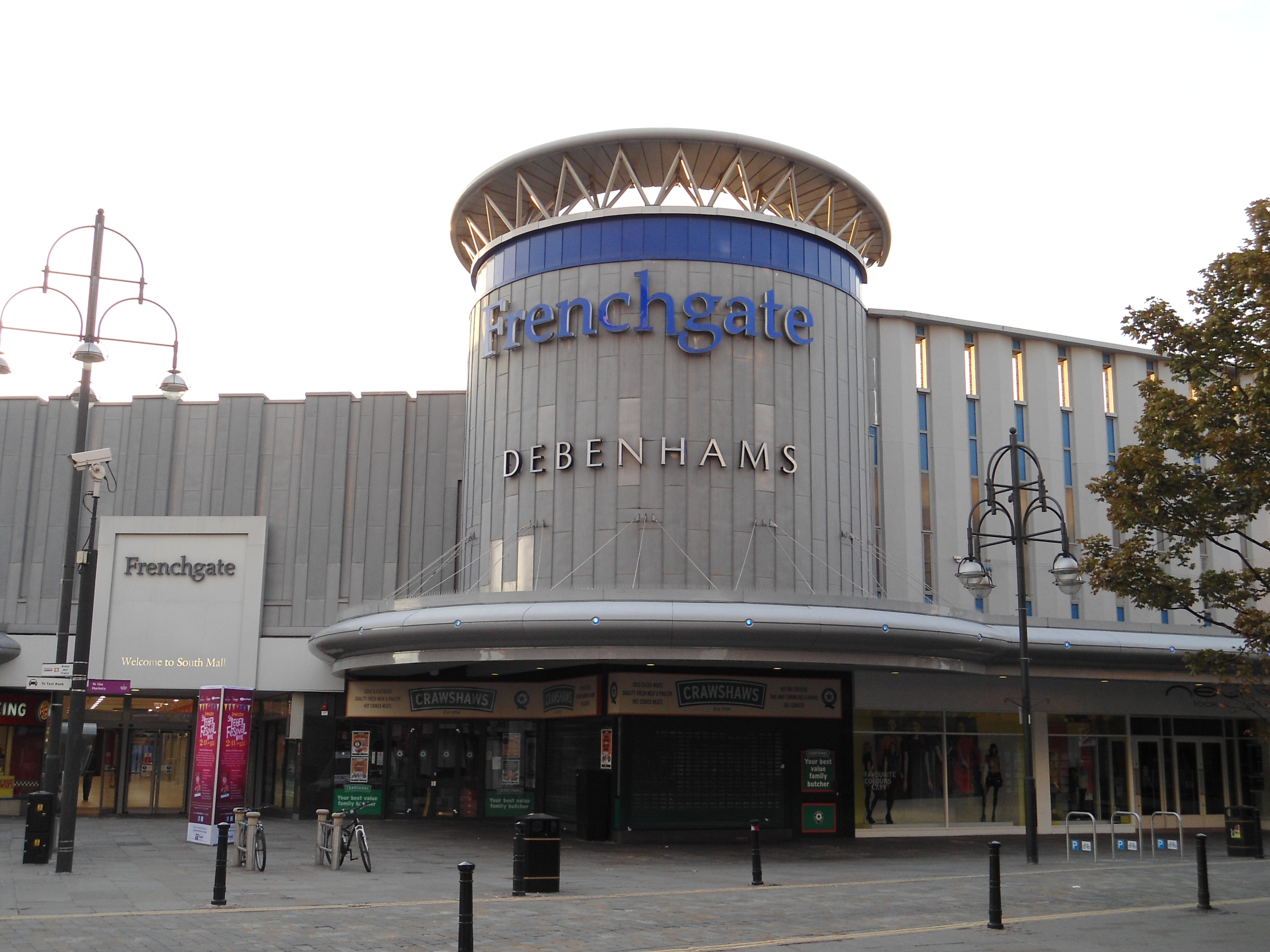
Frenchgate shopping centre

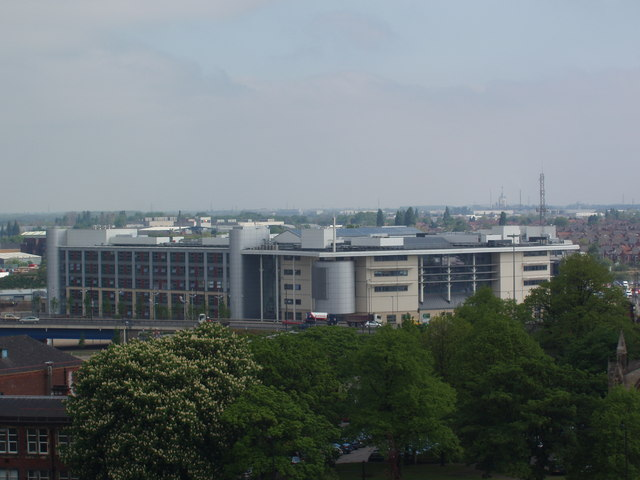
Doncaster College

On 5 March 2004, Doncaster was granted Fairtrade Town status. Over the last few years the Doncaster Lakeside, as home to the Doncaster Rovers ground, has undergone modernisation. Doncaster has a bowling alley and a cinema near Lakeside. The Dome, opened in 1989 by Princess Diana, contains a swimming pool, gym, ice rink and café.

The Frenchgate Centre is a shopping centre and transport interchange. Opened in June 2006, it connects with the railway and bus stations. Lakeside Village, a retail outlet with some 45 retail shops and restaurants lies along the A6182 dual carriageway. The Waterdale area of the town centre is currently undergoing rejuvenation, with a new theatre (known as CAST), new civic offices and a new public square having been completed on the site of the Waterdale car park. The old council house and civic theatre have been demolished and new housing is being built in the town itself, opposite Doncaster Racecourse, and in out-of-town suburbs.

=== Confectionery ===
During the 19th and 20th centuries, confectioners based in Doncaster included Parkinson's the Butterscotch inventors, Nuttalls Mintoes and Murray Mints. In August 2011, Parkinson's put its 190-year-old trademark up for sale on eBay.

=== Coal and industrial expansion ===
The waterways, River Don and Don Navigation were used to transport coal from Doncaster to the steel production centres at Rotherham, Scunthorpe and Sheffield.

A large number of mining jobs were lost in the late 1980s. Today coal mining has ceased.

Rockware Glass is a specialist glass manufacturer. A production facility for chemical polymers was built in Wheatley Hall Road. It changed hands during its existence, until DuPont closed it in the mid-1990s.

Steel foundries, rolling mills and wire mills were built close to the railways that brought steel from Rotherham and Sheffield. Bridon Ropes produces wire rope, including the ropes used at coal mines to haul coal and miners. It is claimed to be the largest wire rope manufacturing plant in Europe. Bridon supplied wire rope for the Olympic Stadium for the 2012 Olympic Games.

During the First and Second World Wars, the town became involved in munitions manufacture.

=== The railways and locomotive works ===
During the Industrial Revolution, the Great Northern Railway established the Doncaster Locomotive and Carriage Building Works; this was to meet Doncaster's communication needs, the necessity to transport coal quickly and efficiently, and due to Doncaster's expertise in specialist metal products. An extensive housing programme was undertaken for the increased population. The Chairman of the Great Northern, anxious about the workers and their families' spiritual welfare, persuaded the directors to contribute towards the building of St James's Church, which became known as the Plant Church; the railway also built St James's School.

The Doncaster Plant became famous for building LNER locomotives Flying Scotsman and Mallard, as well as many thousands more locomotives. By August 2008, most of the plant complex had been razed to make way for a very large housing development. As of 2023, the owner of what remains of the plant, Wabtec, performs the overhaul, maintenance and refurbishment of rail vehicles and associated components.

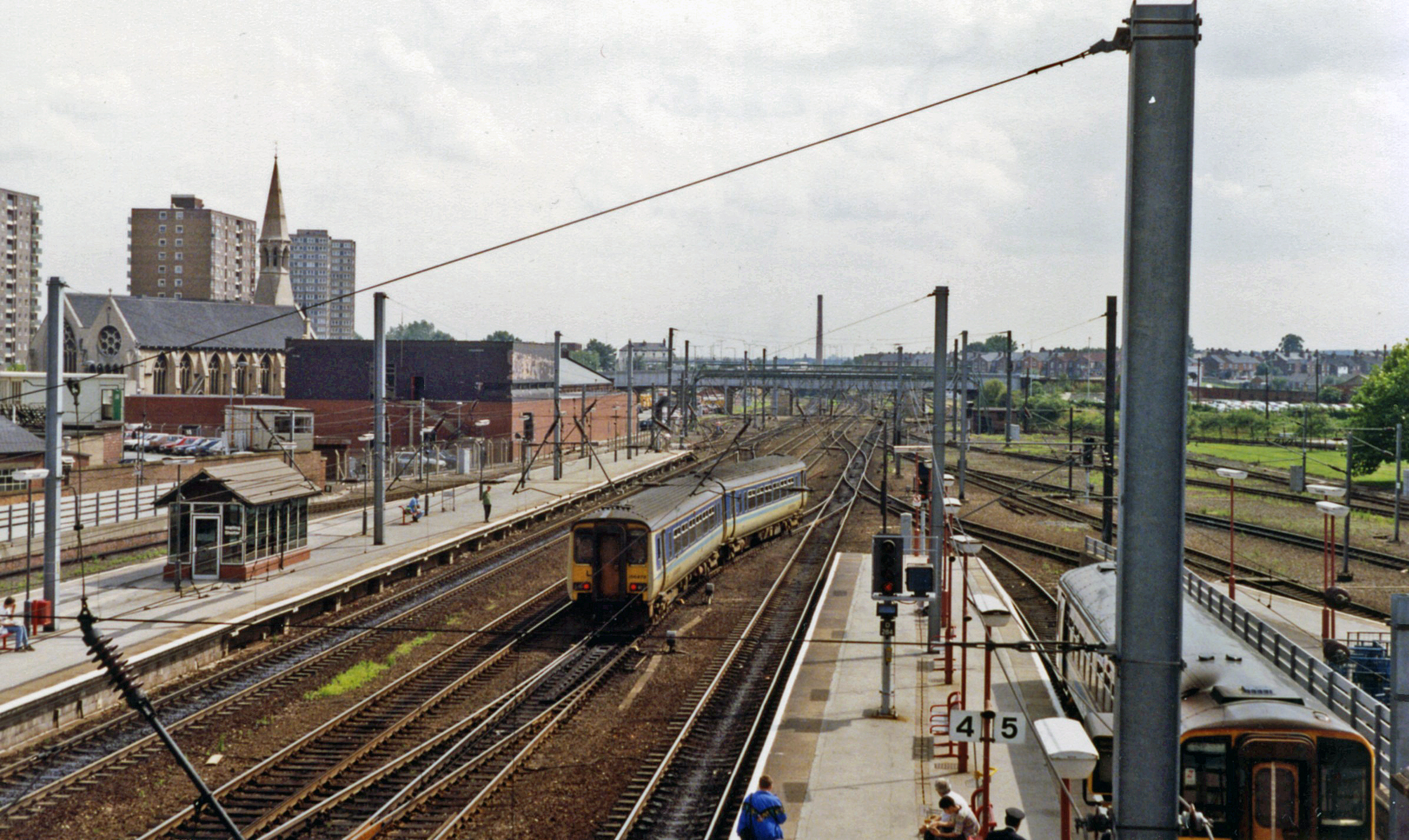
Doncaster railway station

Today, Doncaster railway station is a principal stop and interchange on the East Coast Main Line; it is linked directly to towns and cities across the UK.

Doncaster PSB is one of the largest signalling centres on the UK network, controlling hundreds of route-miles of railway. Doncaster International Railport and Doncaster iPort are important road-rail intermodal terminals. The rail freight company DB Cargo UK has its headquarters in Doncaster.

Also nearby is one of the two National College for Advanced Transport and Infrastructure campuses that specialises in courses relating to the railways and transport systems.

=== Aviation ===
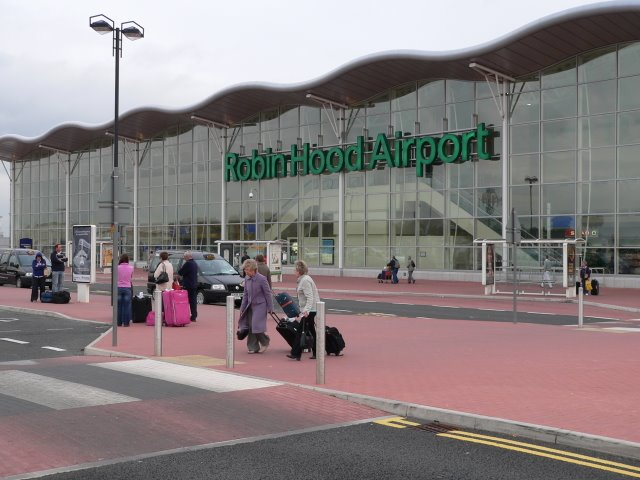
Doncaster Sheffield Airport

In 1909, Doncaster Racecourse was chosen as the venue for an airshow, after the world's first international air display in Reims, France in 1909. Around a dozen aviators were present, the most famous being Léon Delagrange and Roger Sommer. Samuel Cody (no relation to William F. Cody) in an attempt to win a prize offered by the Daily Mail for the first British pilot in a British aeroplane to fly a circular mile signed British naturalisation papers in front of the crowd with the band playing both God Save the King and the Star Spangled Banner. Unfortunately, he crashed his aeroplane on the first day of the meeting and made no significant flights.

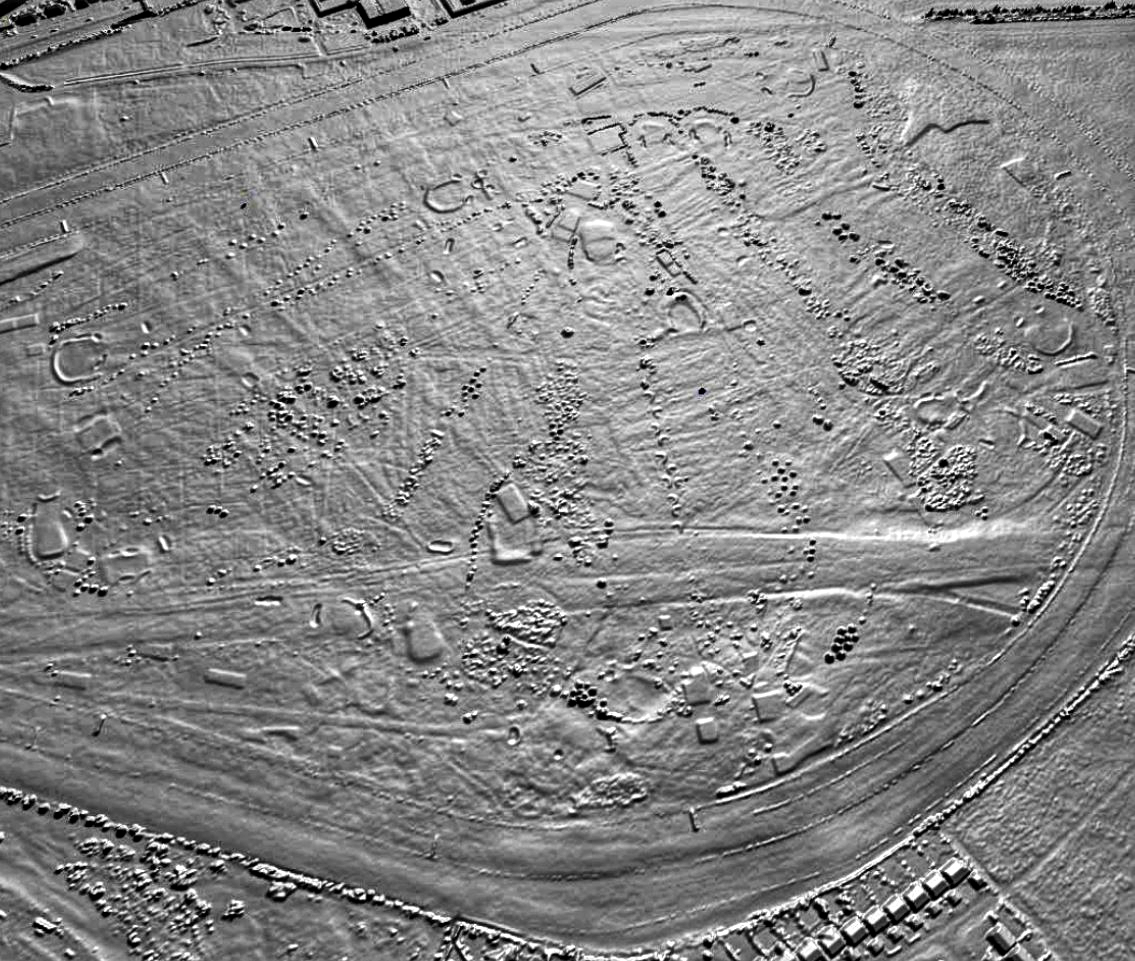
A lidar view of Doncaster Racecourse, Town Moor Golf Course and the site of the early airfield

During the First World War, fighters based first on the racecourse, then at a temporary airstrip near Finningley (later RAF Finningley and now Doncaster Sheffield Airport) and finally, in 1916, on a newly built airfield alongside the racecourse, were deployed to defend the east coast against Zeppelins. On several occasions fighters took off to search for intruders but none were ever seen. The Royal Flying Corps station trained pilots for the war in France. Within months of the war ending the station was put up for sale and two of its three Belfast hangars, the same type that now forms the basis for the Royal Air Force Museum at Hendon, were sold to a Sheffield motor manufacturing company for storage and assembly at Finningley. The third of the hangars stayed in place, mainly housing buses, until the 1970s, when it was knocked down and replaced with modern buildings.

In 1920, the government asked local authorities to assist in forming a chain of airfields for civil air services. Doncaster, with expert advice from Alan Cobham, opened its aviation centre on 26 May 1934. Development of the airfield continued and on 1 July 1936 an international service was opened to Amsterdam. On 1 November 1938, after discussions with the Air Ministry, 616 (South Yorkshire) Squadron of the Royal Auxiliary Air Force was formed. Shortly after the outbreak of war in 1939 the squadron went to its battle station and played a part in the Battle of Britain. After the departure of 616 squadron, its place was taken by the formation of 271 (Transport) Squadron composed mainly of requisitioned civilian aircraft and obsolescent twin-engined bombers. 616 squadron was the first Allied jet fighter squadron, equipped with the Gloster Meteor, famed for using their wingtips to throw German V-1 flying bombs off course. In 1944, after being equipped with American-made Douglas DC-3 Dakotas, the squadron moved south to take part in Operation Overlord and later in the airborne invasion at Arnhem, where Flight Lieutenant David Lord was awarded a posthumous Victoria Cross.

After the war the airfield reverted to civilian flying, and finally closed in 1992.

=== Tractor production ===
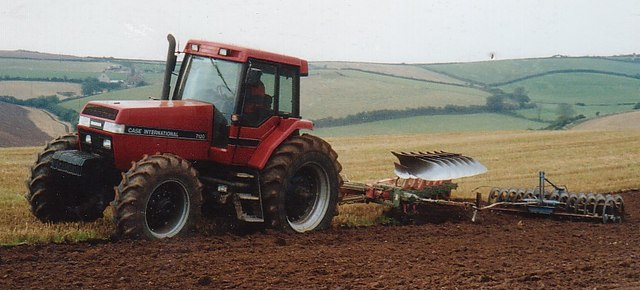
Ploughing by tractor

In 1930, International Harvester (IH) started the production of agricultural implements at a factory on Wheatley Hall Road and later at another in the Carr Hill area of Doncaster. The first tractor built at the factory was a Farmall M, which came off the production line on 13 September 1949. Tractors were initially built from parts shipped from the US. The Wheatley Hall Road factory was extended after the war with a new foundry to make the heavy castings. The factory started Crawler tractor production in 1953. By 1960, the factory was making a range of tractors from scratch, designed specifically for British and European markets and sold under the 'McCormick International' name. Assembly moved in 1965 to the Carr Hill plant. In 1983, tractor production was moved to IH's other Doncaster factory at Wheatley Hall. In 1985, International Harvester sold its agricultural division to Tenneco, Inc. which then merged it with its subsidiary J.I. Case to form Case IH, which continued to design and build its European tractor range in Doncaster, but shutting the David Brown Ltd. tractor factory near Huddersfield. The 350,000th tractor came off the production line in 1999.

In 2000, the factory was purchased by ARGO SpA, an Italian-based agricultural equipment builder. Doncaster was the sole production site of the McCormick Tractors brand, and the factory employed around 380 people (although about 1,100 people are employed in the worldwide McCormick group). In December 2006, the parent company, ARGO Spa, announced that the Doncaster facility would close in 2007, with the loss of around 325 jobs. The announcement was made only a week before Christmas. Sixty-one years of tractor production in Doncaster ended in 2007.

== Culture and tourism ==
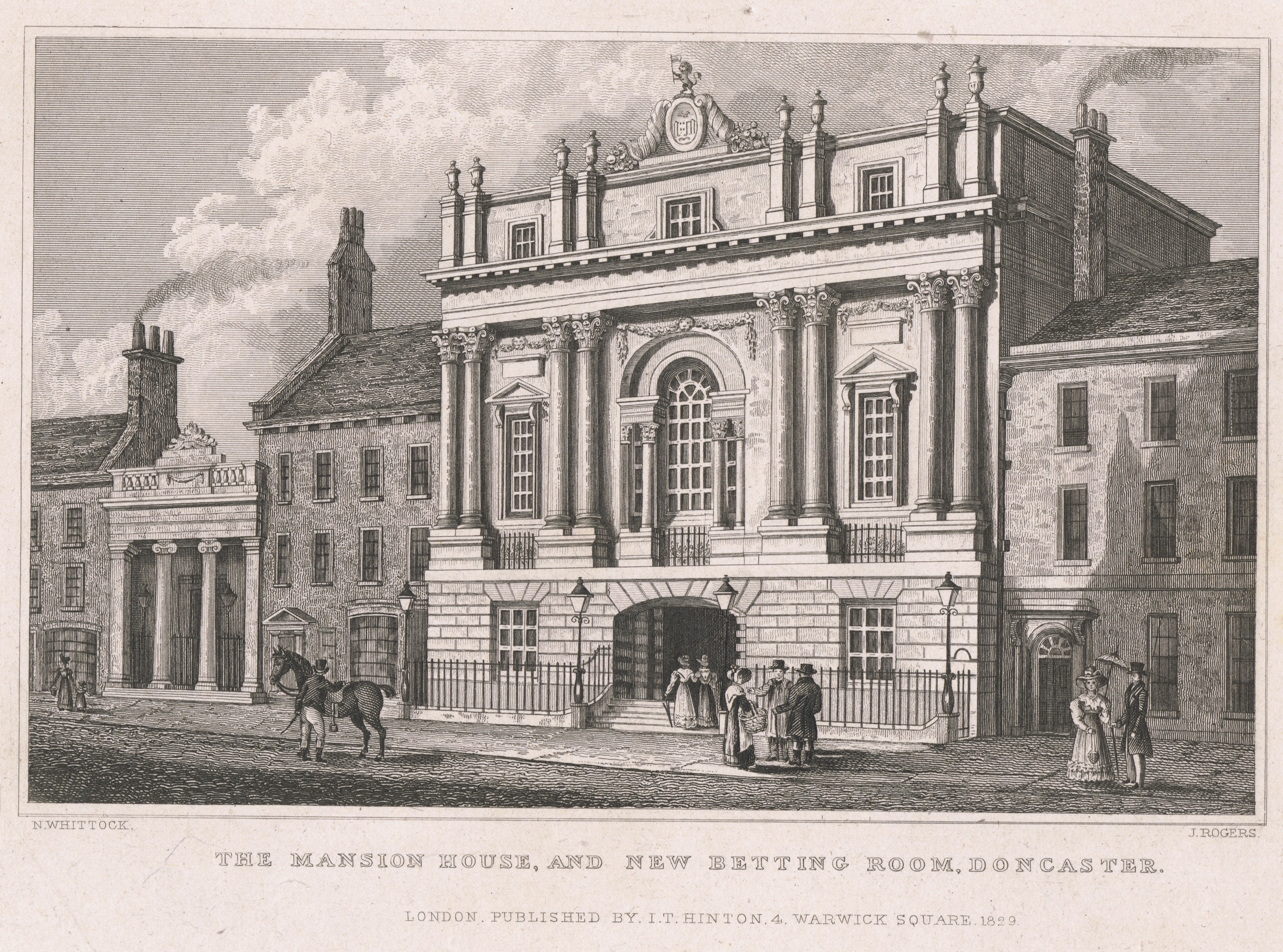
The Mansion House and New Betting Room, Doncaster, engraved by John Rogers after a drawing by Nathaniel Whittock, published by Isaac Taylor Hinton, London, 1829. The architect was James Paine, 1746–1748.

Doncaster Museum and Art Gallery opened as the town's main museum in 1964. It covers natural history, archaeology, local history and fine and decorative art. It has a major exhibition of silverware and trophies won at Doncaster Racecourse. It also houses the Regimental Museum of the King's Own Yorkshire Light Infantry. Doncaster is home to Yorkshire Wildlife Park, which has over 400 animals and over 70 different species, including the only polar bears in England.

The South Yorkshire Aircraft Museum (formerly Aero Venture) is based on the old site of RAF Doncaster at Doncaster Lakeside. The Trolleybus Museum in the nearby village of Sandtoft specialises in preserving trolleybuses, and claims to have the largest collection of them in Europe, with over 60 examples. Markham Grange Steam Museum, in a garden centre in the nearby village of Brodsworth, has a private collection of steam engines. Ashworth Barracks Museum is a military museum in Balby telling the story of the men awarded the Victoria Cross. It also houses a First World War exhibit including a "Weekers Helmet", one of only two known that exist in the UK.

Since 1973, Doncaster has been the home of the Doncaster Youth Jazz Association (DYJA). Founded by John Ellis, DYJA has been a training ground for generations of amateur and professional jazz musicians including, Andy Cato (of Groove Armada), Denis Rollins, John Escreet, Nadim Teimoori and Reuben Fowler.

In 1956, Tish the goldfish was won at a funfair in Doncaster. Tish lived till the age of 43 becoming the world's oldest known goldfish.

=== Theatre and cinemas ===
- Cast is a £22 million venue opened officially on Monday 2 September 2013. Cast includes a 620-seat auditorium, a flexible studio space, drama studio, dance studio, education and ancillary space, and a large foyer with a café. Its director was Kully Thiarai, formerly of the Contact Theatre, Manchester.
- The Doncaster Little Theatre is a 99-seat community theatre which puts on 12 of its own in-house shows including a pantomime, along with two afternoon cabarets a month during the day. Hire companies also use the theatre space for their own shows.
- The town has an 11-screen multiplex Vue which was expanded as part of a £5 million upgrade.
- The six-screen Savoy Cinema opened in May 2021.
- Events and concerts take place at Doncaster Racecourse and The Dome Leisure Centre.

=== Nightlife ===
The Silver Street, Cleveland Street and High Street areas have over 40 bars and clubs within a 2–3-minute walk of each other and other bars can be found on Priory Walk, Lazarus Court, Bradford Row and around the Market Place. Various restaurants serving food from around the world can also be found in the city centre, especially in the Netherhall and Copley Road areas.

== Transport ==
=== Railway ===
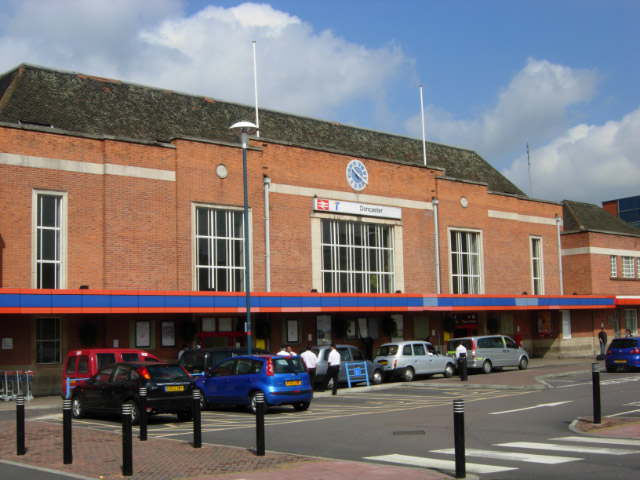
Station frontage

Doncaster railway station is a major interchange station and principal stop on the East Coast Main Line, serving this important railway town. It has nine platforms in use.

The station is served by seven train operating companies:

- CrossCountry operates services between Reading, Birmingham New Street and Newcastle
- East Midlands Railway runs trains to Lincoln and Peterborough
- Grand Central operates services between Bradford Interchange and London King's Cross
- Hull Trains runs services between Hull, Beverley and London King's Cross
- London North Eastern Railway operates inter-city trains to London King's Cross, Leeds, Bradford Forster Square, Hull, York, Newcastle, Edinburgh and Glasgow
- Northern operates stopping services to Sheffield, Leeds and Hull
- TransPennine Express operates a route between Liverpool, Manchester Piccadilly and Cleethorpes.

=== Road ===
Doncaster sits on the European route E15 and is the starting point of European route E13. The E13 connects Doncaster, Sheffield and Nottingham to London. In the United Kingdom, European route designators are not displayed on road signs. The intended motorway design is evidenced in road maps. The M1 was extended northward to Leeds, which is why the E13 starts at Doncaster and follows the path of the M18 and the M1.

Doncaster is situated on the A1(M) and M18 motorways, within 20 minutes of the key M1 and M62 motorways.

The 15-mile (24 km) A1(M) motorway was planned from July 1938, with an inquiry. It was to be 11 miles (18 km), a dual carriageway 120 ft (37 m) wide, with cycle tracks, from the Sun Inn at Bentley, through Alverley, Warmsworth, going near Wadworth, and Tickhill, joining south of Bawtry; the transport ministry authorised this route in June 1939. But in August 1950 the Transport Minister revised the route to start at the Red House as the former route had a weak bridge, with no vehicles over 30 tons allowed. The £5m bypass route was announced on July 12 1956, to be 15 miles. Construction started in June 1959. The bypass subsequently cost £6 million and was opened by Ernest Marples on July 31 1961. The former route is now the A638 and partly the A614 to Blyth.

=== Buses ===
Bus services in the area are operated predominantly by First South Yorkshire and Stagecoach East Midlands. Routes connect the city with Barnsley, Gainsborough, Retford, Scunthorpe and Worksop. Long-distance National Express coach routes travel to Birmingham, Hull, London and Newcastle.

New developments include campus facilities for Doncaster College and the Frenchgate Interchange, a unification of bus and railway stations with the Frenchgate Centre. The extension to the shopping centre and the new bus station opened on 8 June 2006, when all Doncaster bus routes started to use the station.

=== Air ===
Until 2022, Doncaster had an international airport. Doncaster Sheffield Airport opened in 2005, handling its last passenger flight in November 2022 after the Peel Group cited it was unlikely to return to profitability. The airport was closed in 2023, it was largely confirmed before the announcement as a result of the Civil Aviation Authority downgrading the surrounding airspace.

=== Cycling ===
Cycling in Doncaster is increasingly popular. Its situation on the Trans Pennine Trail means it is connected to other surrounding towns. Additionally, cycle lanes are being installed across the borough allowing for safer road commuter cycling.

== Media ==
=== Television ===
Doncaster is served by BBC Yorkshire from Leeds which broadcasts the flagship nightly news programme Look North. ITV Yorkshire is the local ITV franchise.

=== Radio ===
Doncaster is served by several commercial and community radio stations. For 22 years, Trax FM was arguably the most popular station based in the city. It was rebranded as Greatest Hits Radio South Yorkshire in 2020, along with numerous other stations in the region. TX1 Radio was set up following the closure of Trax FM and broadcasts exclusively on DAB radio to Doncaster and Bassetlaw.

BBC Radio Sheffield and Hits Radio South Yorkshire (formerly Hallam FM) also broadcast to the city.

Sine FM is a community radio station broadcasting to Doncaster's central business district and inner suburbs on FM. TMCR 95.3 is a community radio station based in Thorne serving North East Doncaster on FM.

=== Print media ===
The Doncaster Free Press is a weekly newspaper distributed across the greater Doncaster region. Doncaster has its own edition of the Sheffield Star printed daily. The Yorkshire Post is the local daily broadsheet newspaper from Leeds. The Dearne Valley Weekender is a weekly newspaper targeted towards the Dearne Valley, which includes some parts of South West Doncaster, although it is widely available across the town.

== Sport ==
=== Racecourse ===
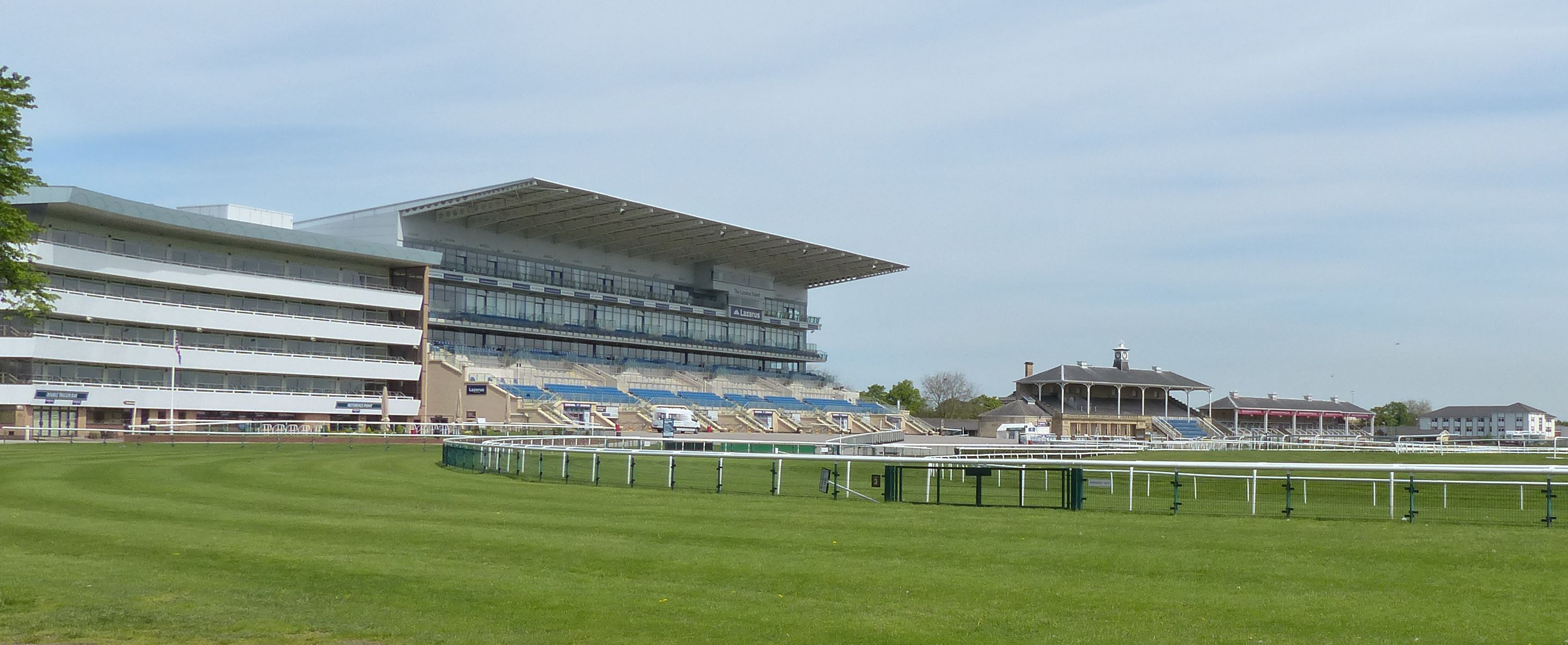
Doncaster Racecourse

From around the 16th century, Doncaster embraced the wealthy stagecoach trade. This led to horse breeding in Doncaster, which in turn led to the start of horseraces there. The earliest important race in Doncaster's history was the Doncaster Gold Cup, first run over Cantley Common in 1766. The Doncaster Cup is the oldest continuing regulated horserace in the world.

=== Rugby football ===
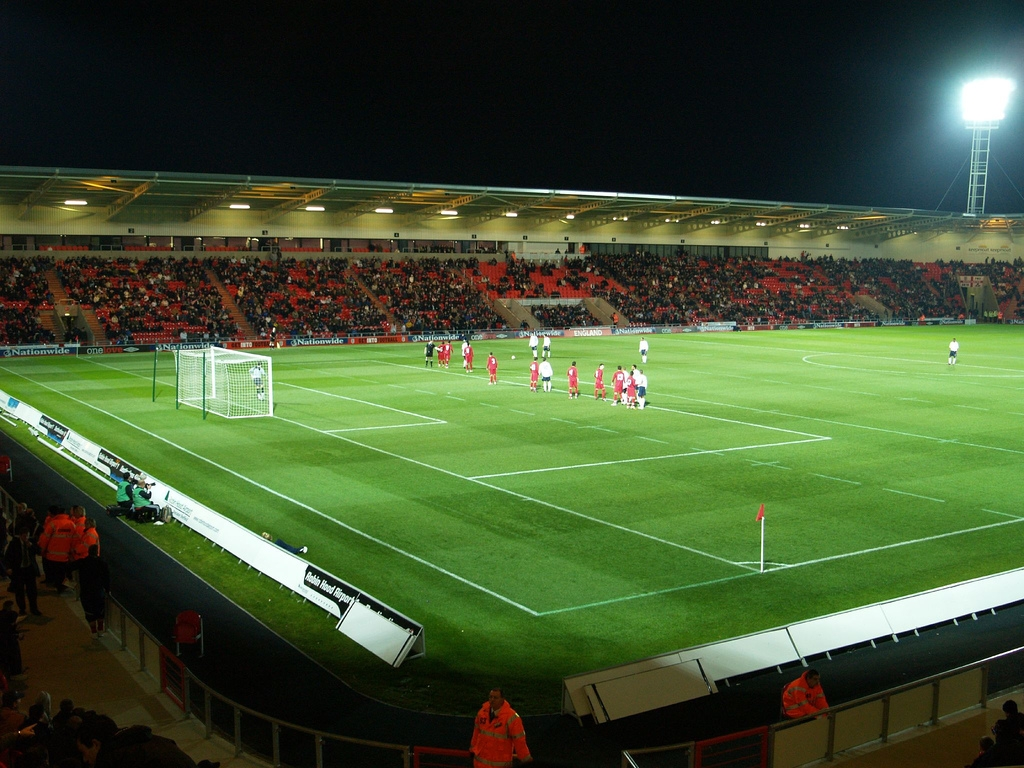
Doncaster Community Stadium

Founded in 1951, Doncaster (formerly known as Doncaster Dragons RLFC and Doncaster Lakers) have played consistently in rugby league's National League One and its successor the RFL Championship, with its home at the Eco-Power Stadium.

Doncaster Knights currently play in rugby union's RFU Championship, with their home at Castle Park.

=== Football ===
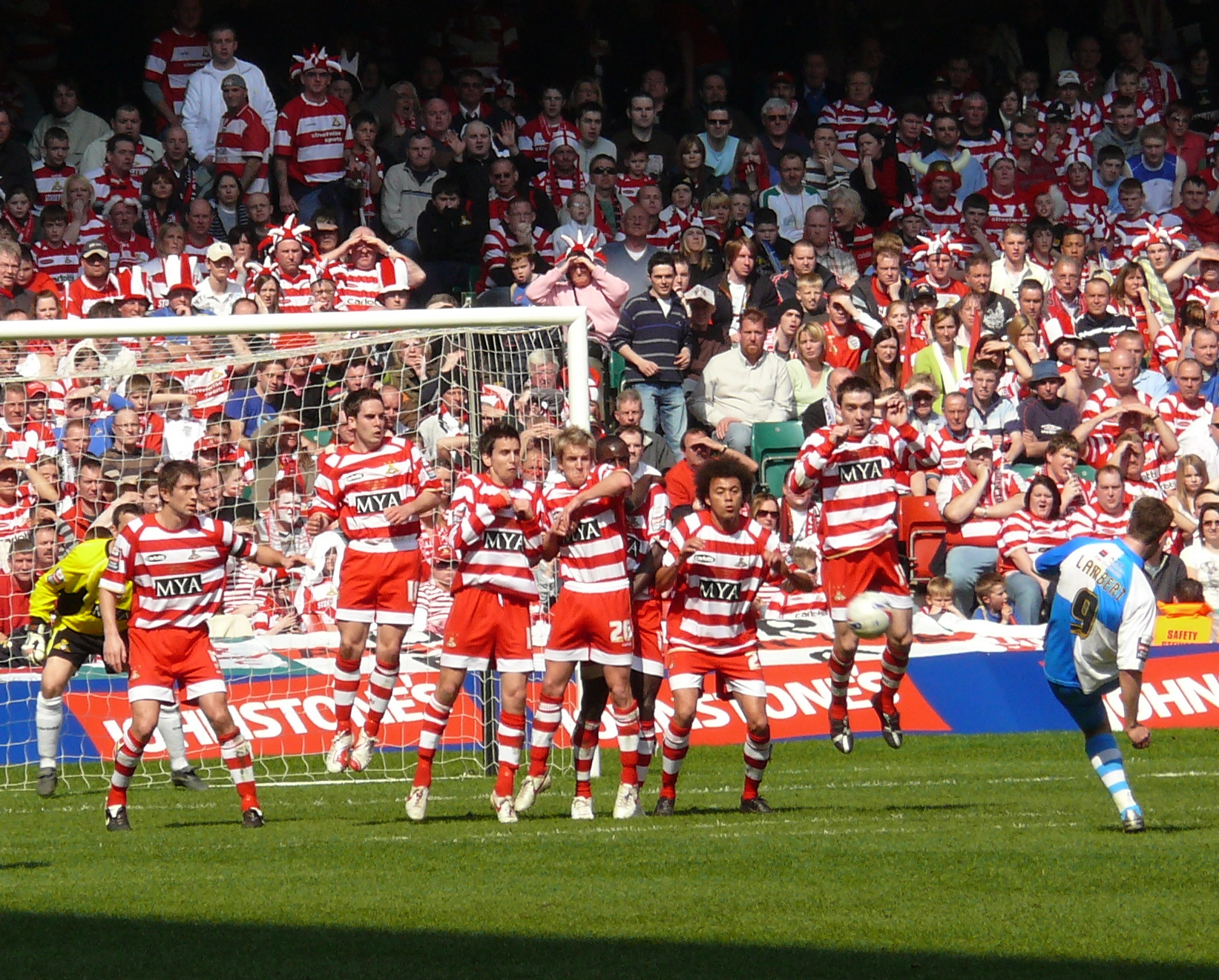
Doncaster Rovers vs Bristol Rovers in the 2007 Football League Trophy Final

Doncaster's only fully professional football club, Doncaster Rovers, play at the Eco-Power Stadium. The city is also home to a number of non-league clubs, playing at smaller grounds based in the various suburbs. Clubs in the city are usually affiliated to the Sheffield and Hallamshire FA.

Doncaster is also home to one of England's most successful and historic women's clubs, Doncaster Rovers Belles, who play fixtures between the Eco-Power Stadium and Chesterfield Poultry Stadium. The club had, until recent years, a long tradition of providing England internationals and was a founder member of the FA WSL.

Doncaster also played host to England's women for their multi-record breaking 20–0 win over Latvia in a European qualifier for the 2023 FIFA Women's World Cup.

=== Others ===
Speedway racing was staged at Doncaster Greyhound Stadium in 1969 and 1970. The team was known as the Stallions and then the Dragons. The team raced in the British League Second Division.

Doncaster has a men's basketball team called the Doncaster Danum Eagles who compete in National League Division 2. Doncaster additionally has an American football team called the Doncaster Mustangs, who are in Division 1 of the British American Football League.

The town also has regular involvement in the Tour de Yorkshire cycling event, having the finish line of stage two, of the 2016 Tour de Yorkshire hosted in Doncaster, as well as the finish line of stage one of the 2018 Tour de Yorkshire hosted in the town as well.

== International links ==
Doncaster is twinned with:

- Avion, Hauts-de-France, France
- Herten, North Rhine-Westphalia, Germany
- Camden, Greater London, England
- Gliwice, Silesian Voivodeship, Poland
- Wilmington, North Carolina, United States

Several roads in the Lakeside area are named after Doncaster's twin towns, such as Gliwice Way, Herten Way, Wilmington Drive and Carolina Way, named after the state where Wilmington lies.

Doncaster was formerly twinned with Ozyorsk, Chelyabinsk Oblast, Russia. This ceased following the 2022 Russian invasion of Ukraine.

== Notable people ==
See Category:People from Doncaster

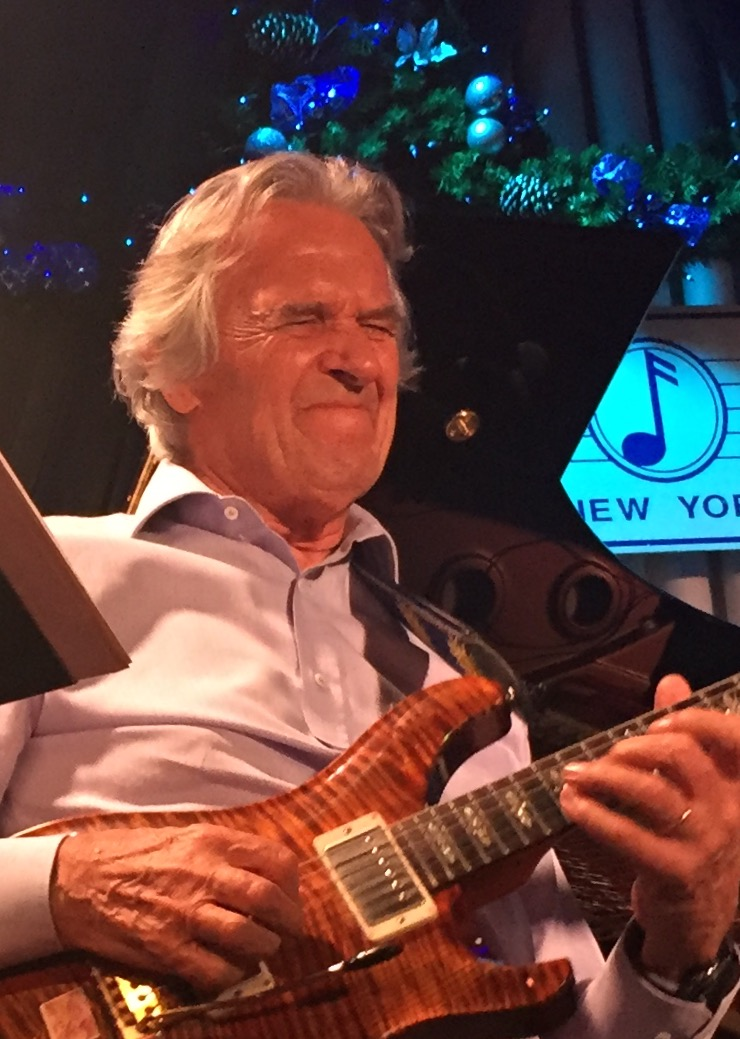
John McLaughlin

- Emma Chambers, actress, famous for her role of Alice Horton in The Vicar of Dibley and Honey Thacker in Notting Hill.
- Roy Clarke, a writer, famous for his Last of the Summer Wine and Keeping Up Appearances.
- Jeremy Clarkson, famous for being the presenter of Top Gear and face of the show The Grand Tour.
- Derek Cook, racing driver
- David Firth, animator and filmmaker.
- Tan France, one of the hosts of Queer Eye.
- Kelly Harrison, actress
- Reg Hollingworth, footballer
- Thomas Howes, known for playing the role of William Mason in the famous British TV series Downton Abbey.
- Kevin Keegan, football manager and former player.
- John McLaughlin, highly reputed guitarist and frontman of Mahavishnu Orchestra
- Danny Schofield, a professional football coach and a former player.
- Sarah Stevenson, 2011 world champion of Taekwondo.
- Louis Tomlinson, English singer, songwriter and model, member of boy band One Direction
- James Toseland, a former motorcyclist, currently vocalist in a band with his own name.
- Diana Rigg, actress
- Danny Rose, former English football player at club and international level.
- Andrew White, presenter and producer of Walks Around Britain and writer of The Walker Mysteries novels.
- Yungblud, singer, songwriter and musician.
- John Parr, Musician
- Lesley Garrett, Soprano Singer

== See also ==
- Listed buildings in Doncaster (Town Ward)
- Doncaster College
- Trolleybuses in Doncaster
- Doncaster Caledonian Society
