= Reg Hollingworth =

English footballer

Personal information
- Full name: Reginald Hollingworth
- Date of birth: 17 October 1909
- Place of birth: Doncaster, England
- Date of death: 8 July 1969 (aged 59)
- Place of death: Birmingham, England
- Position: Defender

Senior career*
Years	Team	Apps	(Gls)
- Nuffield Colliery
- Sutton Junction
1928–1936	Wolverhampton Wanderers	167	(7)
- * Club domestic league appearances and goals

Reginald Hollingworth (17 October 1909 – 8 July 1969) was an English footballer who played in the Football League for Wolverhampton Wanderers.

== Career ==
Hollingworth, born in Doncaster but raised in Rainworth, was training as a mechanical engineer and playing amateur football for Sutton Junction when he was spotted by Wolverhampton Wanderers. He joined the Second Division club on 8 November 1928, making his first team debut two days later in a 2–0 win at their Black Country rivals West Bromwich Albion.

The defender made only sporadic appearances during his first seasons with the Molineux club, but became a first team regular during the 1930–31 season. The following season he was again a bedrock of their defence as the club won the Second Division championship and returned to the top flight after a 26-year absence.

This season also saw him selected by England to play in a trial match in March, preceding a Home International against Scotland, but he was forced to pull out after damaging his ankle on the eve of the game in a league match.

Injuries began to persistently restrict his career over the following years causing him to announce his football retirement at the end of the 1935–36 season, aged 26. He had made 180 appearances in total for Wolves, scoring eight times.

After leaving football, he joined the Staffordshire police force, and also later worked at the Goodyear factory in Wolverhampton. He died on 8 July 1969, aged 59, when he suffered a heart attack while out driving in Birmingham.

== Honours ==
with Wolverhampton Wanderers

- Second Division: 1931–32
