= Cycling in South Yorkshire =

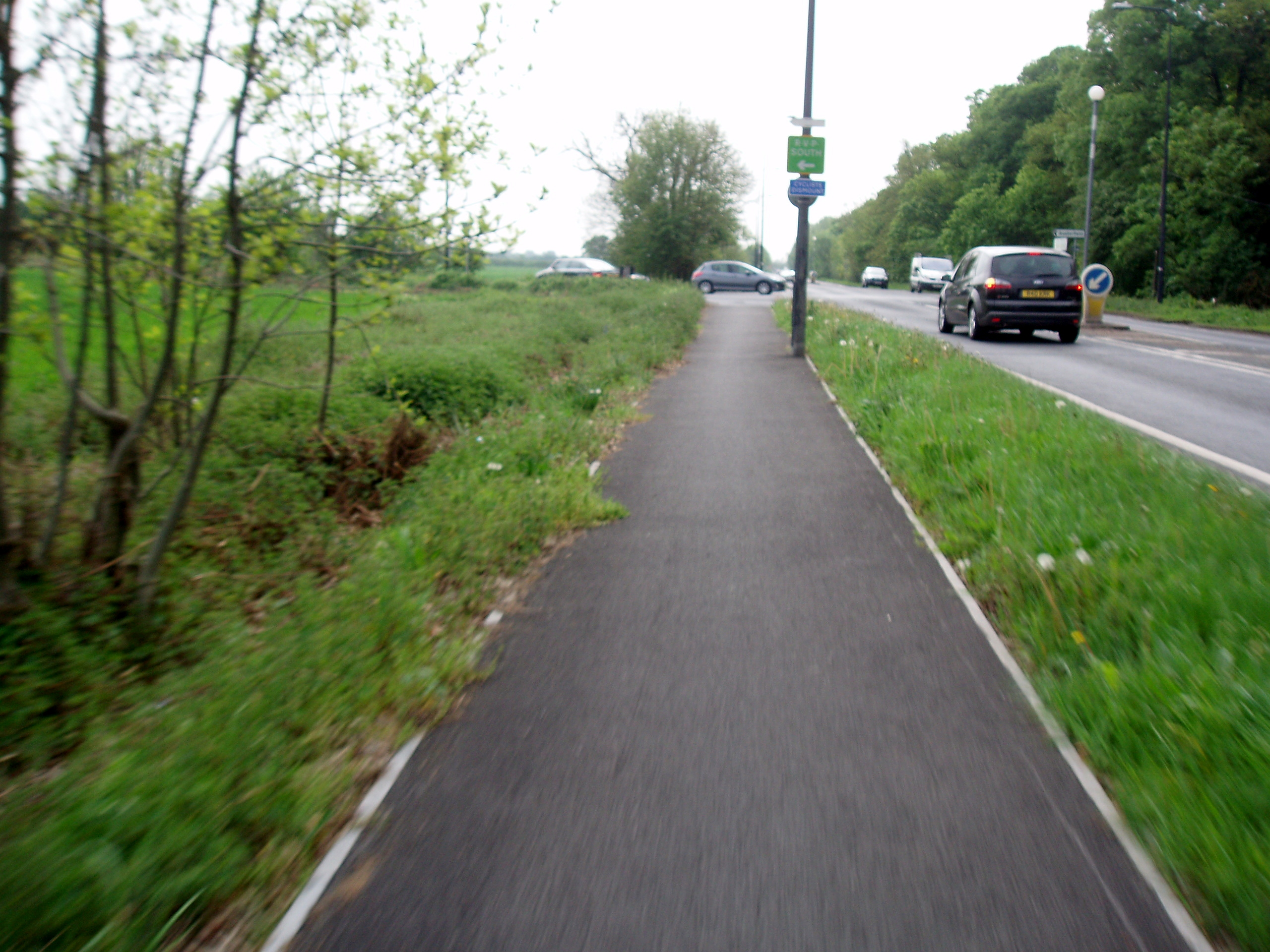
Cycle lane adjacent to the A638 road near Rossington

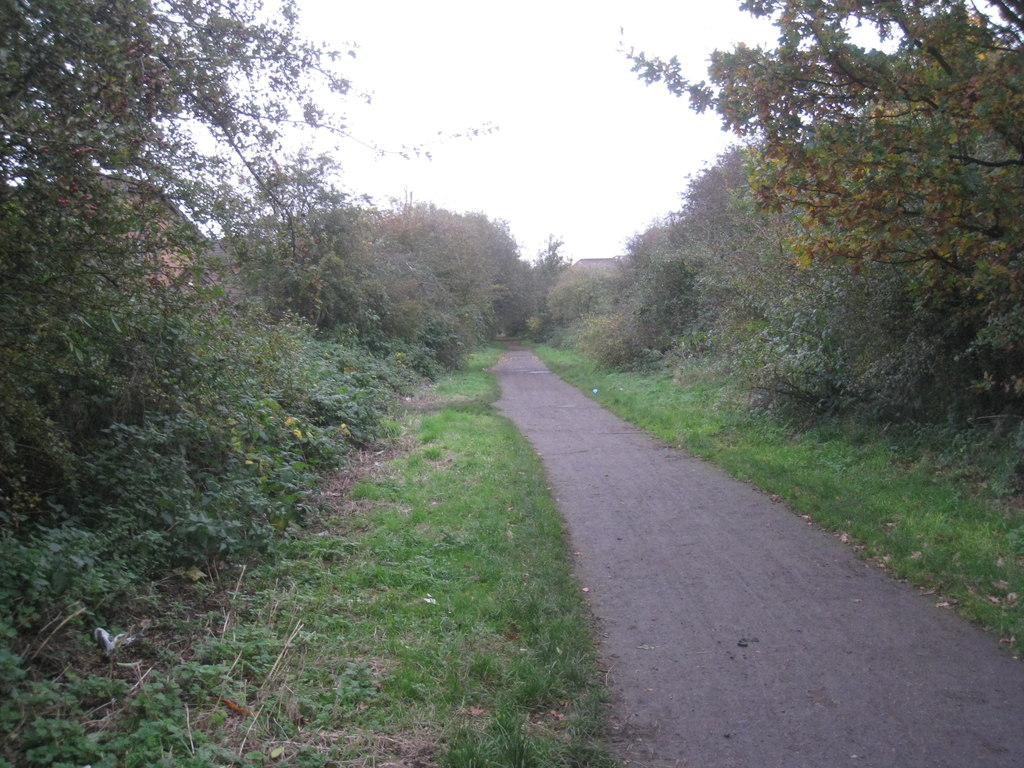
National Cycle Network Route 62 in Cusworth

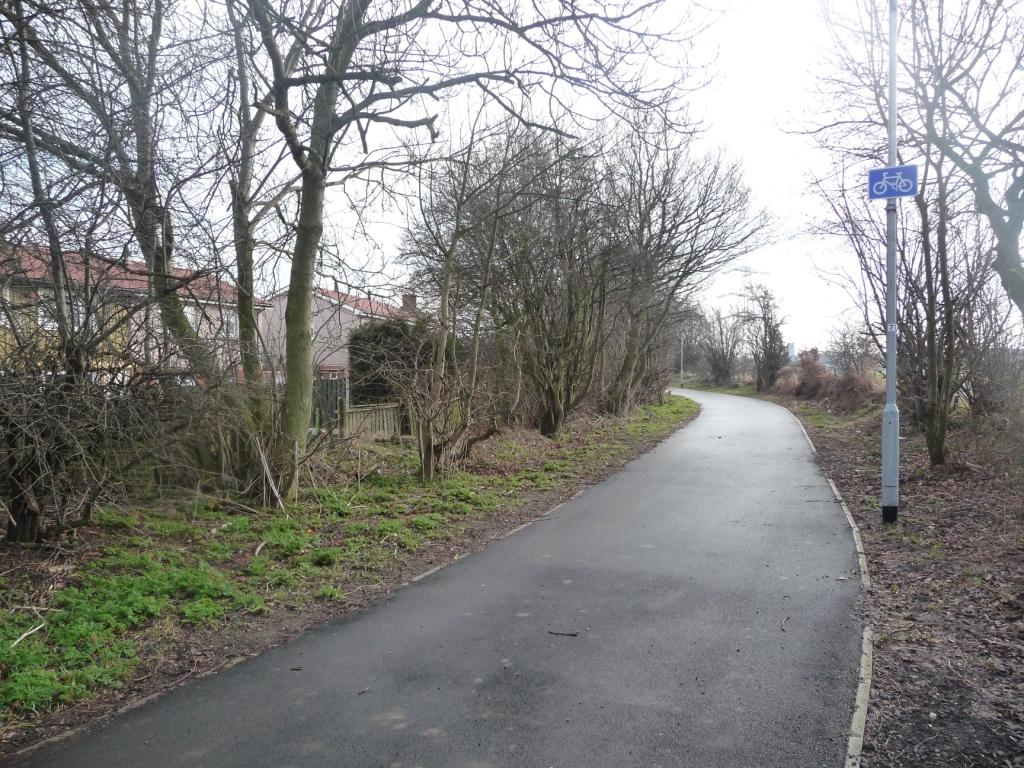
Cycle track in Royston

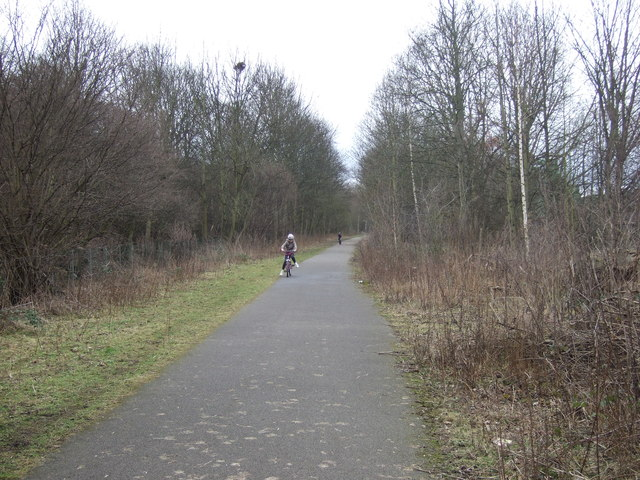
Leisure cycleway near Shiregreen

Cycling is a popular method of transport in the county of South Yorkshire, England. Between 2006 and 2014, there was an increase of over 25% in the number of cycle journeys being made in the county's urban areas.

As part of the South Yorkshire Active Travel Fund, the four boroughs of Sheffield, Doncaster, Barnsley and Rotherham have invested in the construction of several new cycling infrastructure projects, including cycle paths, and integrated and segregated cycle lanes.

== Commuter cycling ==
A small number of roads in South Yorkshire are being provided with segregated cycle lanes, such as in Penistone Road, Bennetthorpe and Sheffield Road. This is intended to enable people to cycle safely and to allow more people to consider cycling for local journeys. It is also hoped that it will improve air quality in towns and cities by taking cars off the road.

== Leisure cycling ==
The Trans Pennine Trail, a 215-mile-long national route for recreation and transport, connecting Southport, Merseyside on the west coast to Hornsea, East Yorkshire on the east coast, passes through South Yorkshire. It is used primarily for leisure cycling rather than commuter cycling as it often does not take direct routes and is unpaved in some stretches.

The main east–west route passes through Penistone, Dodworth, Worsbrough, Wombwell, Manvers, Harlington, Sprotbrough, Cusworth, Bentley, Thorpe in Balne, Braithwaite and Sykehouse. A north–south extension connects Royston, Cudworth, Stairfoot, Elsecar, Wentworth, Tankersley, the Meadowhall shopping centre and Beighton.

South Yorkshire hosts numerous parks, forests, lakes and reserves that can be enjoyed by bike.
