= Alverley =

Hamlet in South Yorkshire, England

Coordinates: 53.487°N 1.155°W

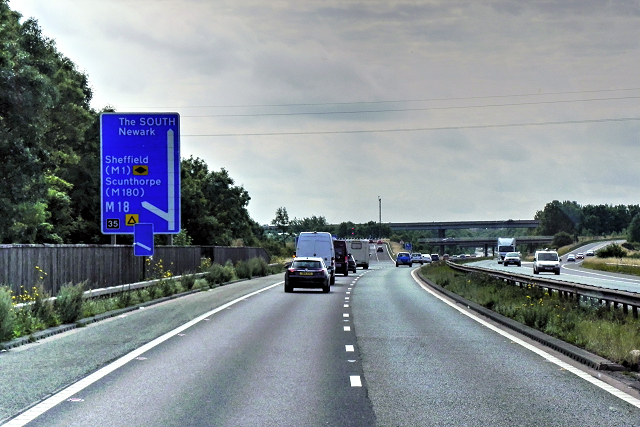
- The A1(M) passing through Alverley

- Location within South Yorkshire
- Metropolitan borough: Doncaster
- Metropolitan county: South Yorkshire
- Region: Yorkshire and the Humber
- Country: England
- Sovereign state: United Kingdom
- Post town: DONCASTER
- Postcode district: DN11
- Dialling code: 01709
- Police: South Yorkshire
- Fire: South Yorkshire
- Ambulance: Yorkshire
- UK Parliament: Doncaster Central

Alverley is a hamlet in South Yorkshire, England, south of Doncaster. The A1(M) passes through the hamlet, close to the intersection with the M18 near Loversall.

Alverley Hall stood west of the hamlet, and dated back to 1779, being built by Samuel Dixon of Loversall.
