= Doncaster Civic Office =

Municipal building in Doncaster, South Yorkshire, England

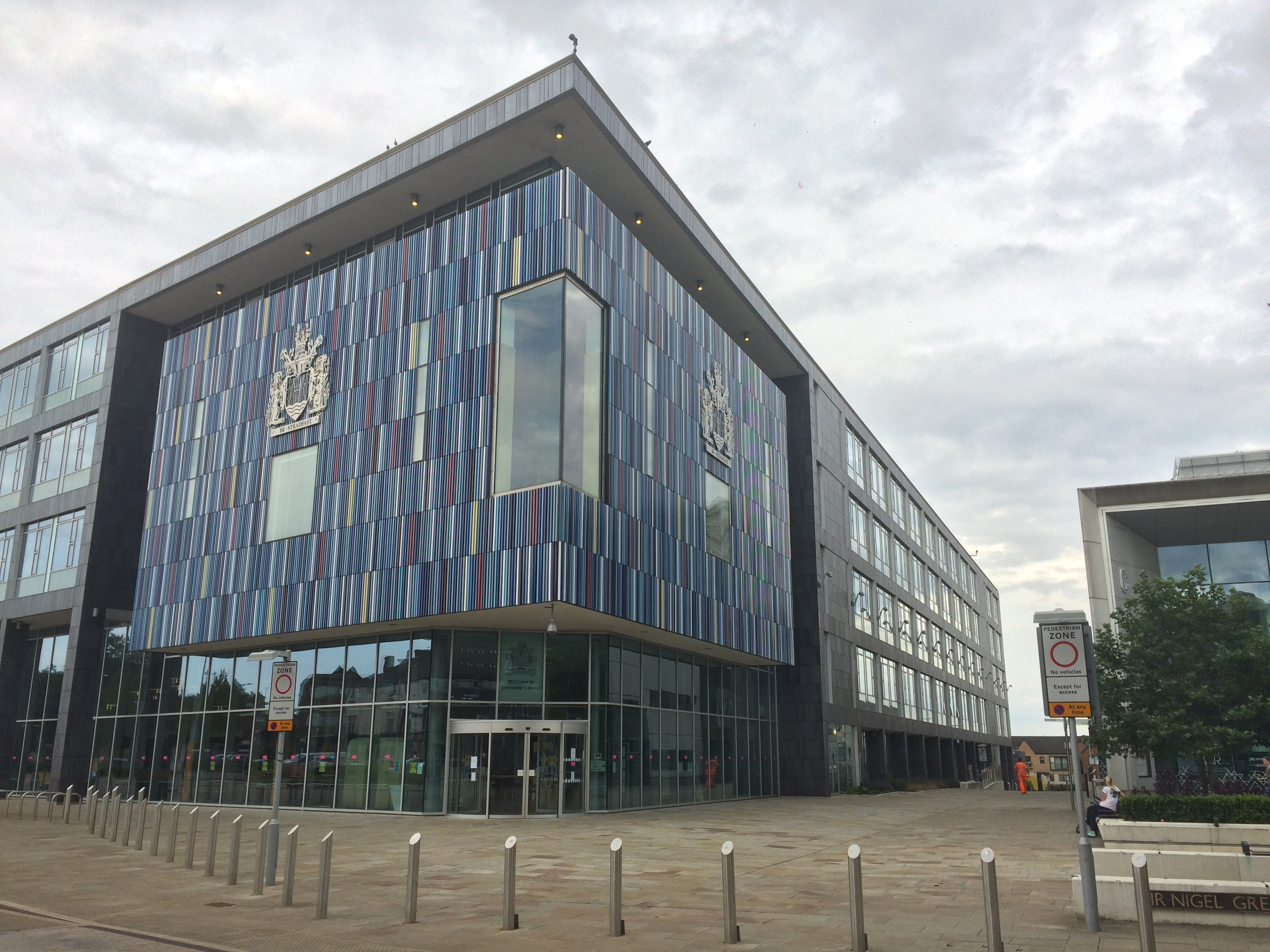
- Doncaster Civic Office

- Shown in South Yorkshire
- 53.5205°N 1.1304°W
- Location: Waterdale, Doncaster

History
- Built: 2012

Site notes
- Architect: Cartwright Pickard
- Architectural style: International Style

Doncaster Civic Office is a municipal building in Waterdale, Doncaster, South Yorkshire, England. The structure is the meeting place of City of Doncaster Council.

== History ==
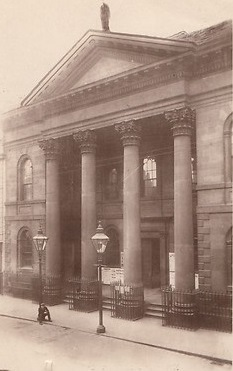
The old Doncaster Guildhall in 1911

The first municipal building in the town had its origins in the ruins of the Church of St Mary Magdalene which was built in the Market Place in around 1130. Civic leaders acquired the old church in 1557 and converted the surviving chancel and nave into a town hall: the structure was rebuilt to a neoclassical design by William Lindley in 1786. Lindley's design involved a symmetrical main frontage with nine bays facing onto the Market Place; the central section of three bays featured round headed openings on the ground floor, tall sash windows on the first floor and shorter sash windows on the second floor flanked, on the two upper floors, by Doric order pilasters supporting a pediment. There was a figure depicting Justice at the apex of the pediment and urns on either side of the pediment.

In 1846 the civic leaders decided to demolish the old town hall and to erect a new guildhall: the site they selected for the new building, in Frenchgate, was occupied by a public house, the Angel Inn. The new structure was designed by John Butterfield, also in the neoclassical style, built in ashlar stone and was completed in 1848. The design involved a symmetrical main frontage with five bays facing onto Frenchgate; the central section of three bays, which slightly projected forward, featured a tetrastyle portico with Corinthian order columns supporting an entablature and a modillioned pediment. Although it was a Grade II listed building, it was demolished by Doncaster Council in 1969 to make way for an extension to a Marks & Spencer shop.

After briefly being located at 1 Priory Place during the 1970s, Doncaster Metropolitan Borough Council relocated to modern offices at Copley House in Waterdale in the early 1980s, and then to Coal House, the former offices of the National Coal Board, in May 1992.

As part of a wider regeneration scheme for the Waterdale area, the council decided to demolish their former offices at Coal House and to commission a new structure on the site of the old Waterdale Campus of Doncaster College. The new building was designed by Cartwright Pickard in the International Style, built in glass and steel at a cost of £20 million and was completed in October 2012.

The design involved a 5-storey rectangular tower block with 8 bays facing onto Waterdale: the southwest corner of the building, which was recessed, featured, on the ground floor, a glass doorway providing access from the new Sir Nigel Gresley Square, named after the railway engineer, Sir Nigel Gresley. At that corner, on the upper floors, there was a display of 3,200 glazed terracotta titles with the borough coat of arms superimposed on the tiles. Internally, the principal room was the council chamber.
