= Frenchgate Shopping Centre =

Shopping mall in Doncaster, South Yorkshire, England

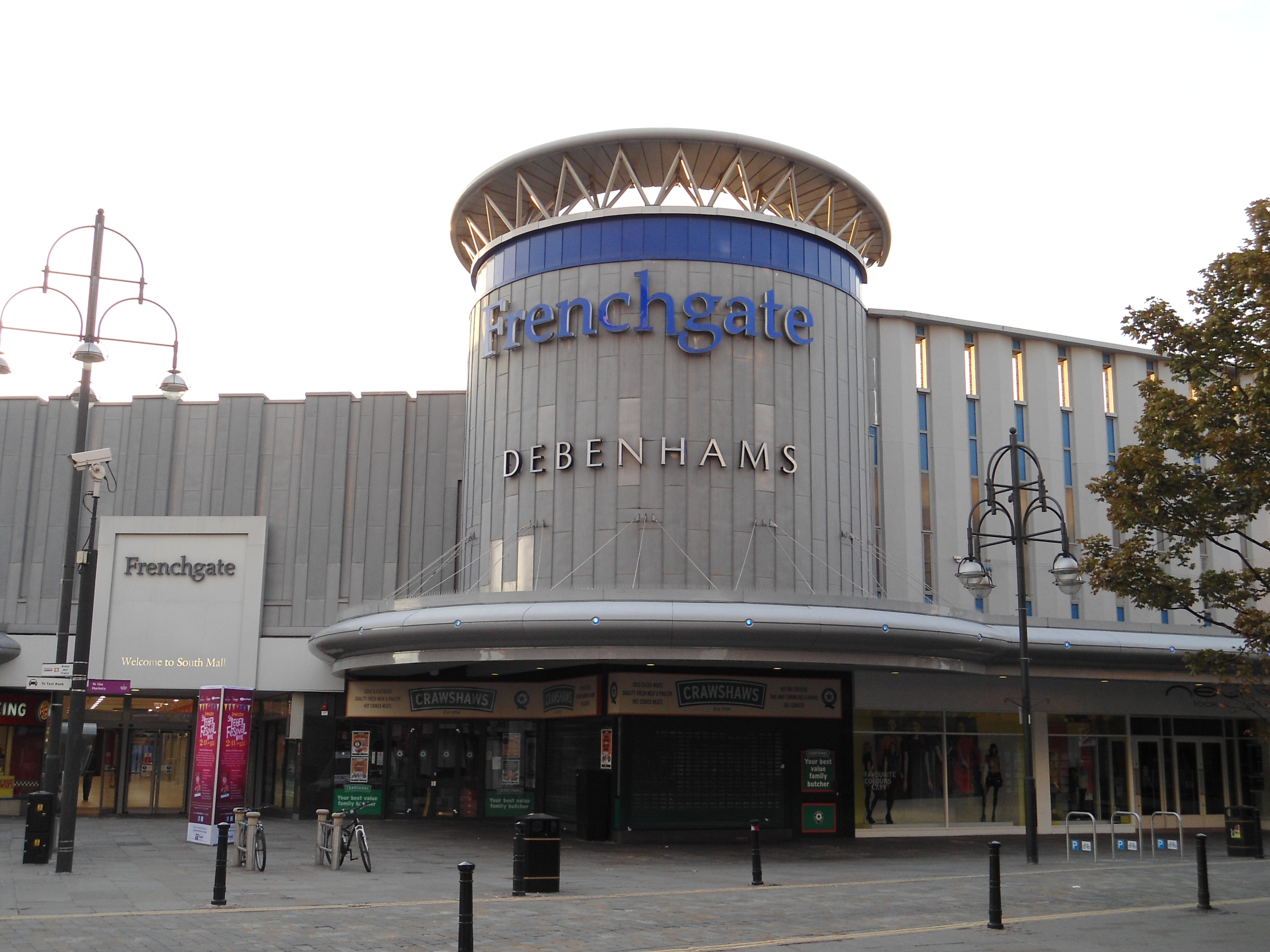
- Location: Frenchgate Shopping Centre, St Sepulchre Gate, Doncaster, South Yorkshire, England, DN1 1SW
- Coordinates: 53.5233°N 1.1373°W
- Opened: 4 October 1968; 58 years ago
- Developer: Arndale Group
- Owner: Frasers Group
- Num. of stores: 120
- Floor area: 880,000 sq ft (82,000 m^{2})
- Website: frenchgateshopping.co.uk

The Frenchgate Shopping Centre (formerly Arndale Centre) is a large shopping centre located in the city centre of Doncaster, South Yorkshire, England. It is named after the street of the same name that formed one of the old gates of medieval Doncaster.

The centre has been the heart of the city for over 40 years and was originally called the Arndale Centre because it was built, owned and managed by the Arndale Group. It was renamed in 1988 after a change of ownership, with the new name reflecting the name of the street which passes to the east of the centre and which is one of Doncaster's main shopping streets.

The sale of the centre came just a year after Frenchgate had undergone a £200 million facelift to transform it into the country's first shopping centre with integrated public transport and retail interchange.

Before the change of name from Arndale to Frenchgate Centre, the centre was home to a controversial statue entitled 'The Lovers', which depicted a naked couple in a passionate embrace and which was the subject of many complaints from mothers who claimed that it was not appropriate for young children to see.

In 2004, the Northern Bus Station and Gresley House, which were located on the northern side of Trafford Way, the road that passed around the northern side of the Frenchgate Centre, and where the rear entrance and service areas were located, were demolished to make way for a new Transport interchange and extension to the Frenchgate Centre. As part of this project, the centre also received a major multimillion-pound refurbishment, incorporating the centre into the new transport interchange. During the building of the extension, which involved building a tunnel over Trafford Way, part of the tunnel collapsed, severely injuring one of the building workers from the site.

The extension and transport interchange opened to the public on 8 June 2006.

== See also ==
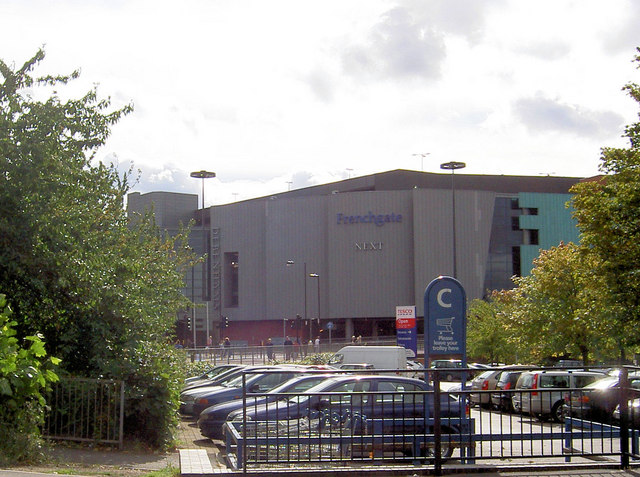

- Doncaster Frenchgate Interchange
- Doncaster railway station
- Travel South Yorkshire
