= Doncaster Caledonian Society =

The Doncaster Caledonian Society was founded in Doncaster in the 18th century and holds regular meetings for its members at Doncaster Golf Club to promote Scottish culture and traditions in the local area. Meetings consist of celebrations for St. Andrew's Day, Burns Supper and holding monthly seminars.

The 2016–17 President is Vivien M'Itwamwari, a past President of the Yorkshire District World Burns Federation, and the Vice-President is David Hunter.

In 2014, members of the society took part in creating the Scottish Diaspora Tapestry, by stitching Henry of Scotland as he gained the Lordship of Doncaster during his lifetime.
