= Sprotbrough and Cusworth =

Civil parish in South Yorkshire, England

Coordinates: 53.5164°N 1.1946°W

- Civil parish
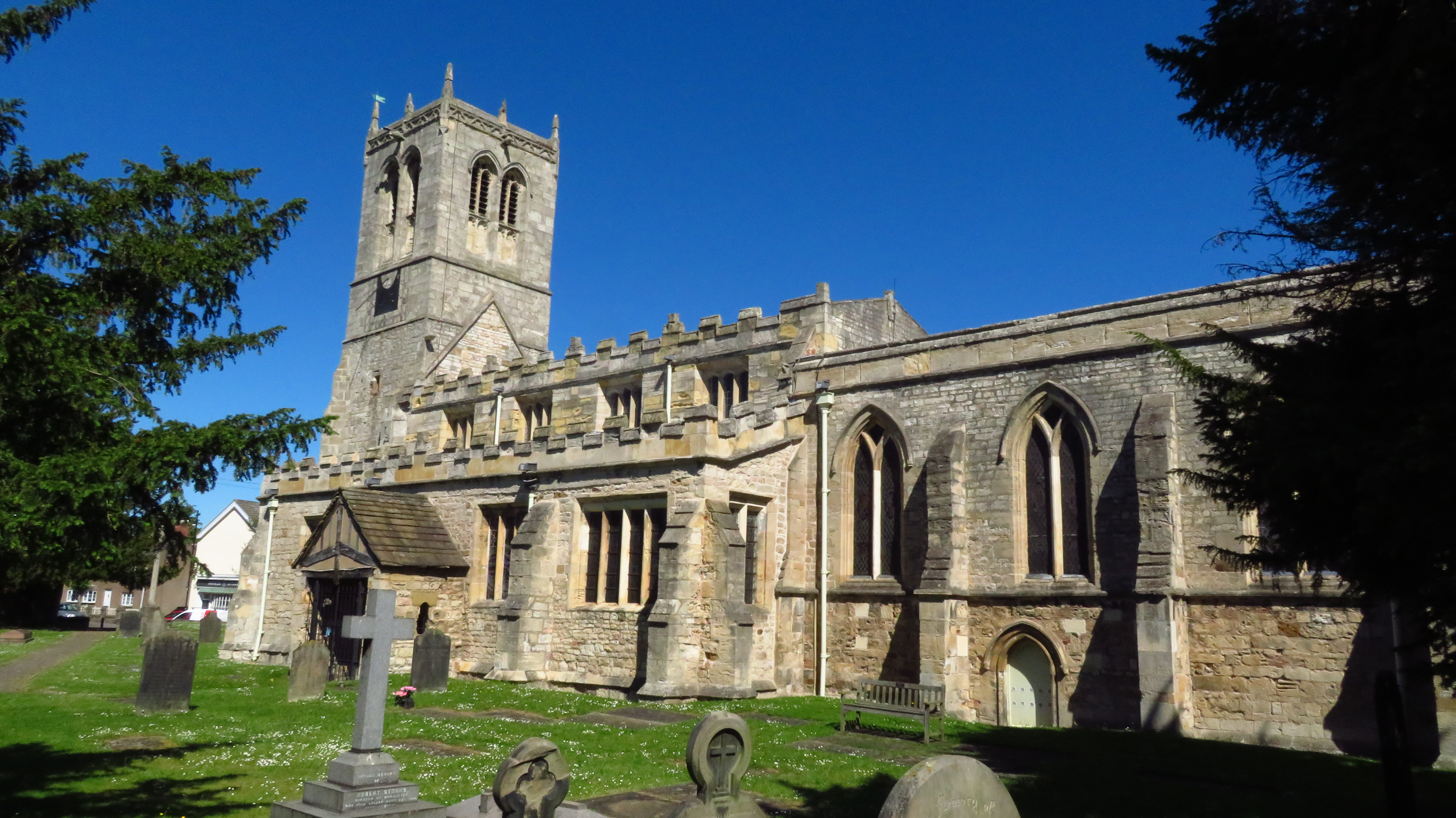
- St Mary's Church, Sprotbrough

- Location within South Yorkshire
- Area: 4.28 sq mi (11.1 km^{2})
- Population: 12,134 (2011)
  - Density: 2,835/sq mi (1,095/km^{2})
- OS grid reference: SE535025
- Civil parish: Sprotbrough and Cusworth
- Metropolitan borough: City of Doncaster
- Metropolitan county: South Yorkshire
- Region: Yorkshire and the Humber
- Country: England
- Sovereign state: United Kingdom
- Post town: DONCASTER
- Postcode district: DN5
- Dialling code: 01302
- Police: South Yorkshire
- Fire: South Yorkshire
- Ambulance: Yorkshire
- UK Parliament: Doncaster North
- Website: Sprotbrough and Cusworth

Sprotbrough and Cusworth is a civil parish in the City of Doncaster in South Yorkshire, England, with most of its settlements on the western edge of the Doncaster built-up area. It lies between 1 mile (1.6 km) and 4 miles (6.4 km) to the west of Doncaster and is split by the A1(M) motorway. It had a population of 12,166 in 2001 and 12,134 at the 2011 Census. The parish covers some of Doncaster's outlying western suburbs and commuter belt including the villages of Sprotbrough, Cusworth, and a small part of Scawsby, in addition to several rural hamlets and farmsteads.

Numerous other parishes border it, among them Warmsworth, Balby, Brodsworth and Marr.

== Origins and history ==
The name Sprotbrough originates from the Old English sprote ('shoot', 'twig') and burh ('fortification'), as suggested by the Domesday Book entry Sproteburg; the name may reflect the hasty manner in which the fortification was constructed and / or may be a reference to the building material used.

The early parish contained six settlements:

- Sprotbrough (Sproteburg)
- Cadeby (Catebi)
- Wildthorpe (Widentorp)
- Cusworth (Cuzenworde)
- Skinthorpe (Scinestorp)
- Newton, first mentioned in 1379 when it was called New Farmstead

Those early hamlets were ringed by vast areas of agricultural land and many of the open fields still present today have names that can be traced back to early maps of the area.

The area, and almost all of the land around it, was owned by the FitzWilliam family for many years. Sir John Fitzwilliam erected a cross next to the church during the reign of Henry V of England. Into the cross were carved these lines: "Whoso is hungry and lists to eat, Let him come to Sprotburgh for his meat, And for a night and for a day, His horse shall have both corne and hay, And no man shall ask him when he goeth away."

There are also a number of statues and memorials to the Fitzwilliams and Copleys in the Grade I listed Church of St Mary the Virgin.

=== Sprotbrough Hall ===
Part of the village was built on the site of Sprotbrough Hall, a large home built for the Copley family in 1670. The Copley family had married a FitzWilliam heiress and inherited the extensive holdings of the FitzWilliam lords of Sprotborough (older spelling). The family lost three sons in the First World War and the Hall was demolished in the 1920s. Doncaster archives hold a copy of the catalogue of the house contents. Little evidence of the Hall remains except for the old 18th century stable yard, now apartments, and some of the street names. The wrought-iron gate opposite the village shop is from the "Lady's Walk" which was part of the gardens. This has been resited to its present position. Looking up from the towpath by the river, the balustraded viewing area which was directly in front of the Hall can still be seen. Copley Junior School in Sprotbrough village is named after the Copley family.

The Second World War hero Sir Douglas Bader grew up at the Rectory in the village when his step-father was Rector of St Mary's. The Old Rectory, previously a guest house, bears a plaque commemorating Bader's residence. Sir Walter Scott set Ivanhoe in and around the village, which is remembered in the name of the village's pub and a small housing estate off Sprotbrough Road.

=== Cusworth Hall ===
Cusworth Hall, which overlooks the parish to the north, was built by William Wrightson between 1740 and 1755 and was the home of the Battie-Wrightson family until 1952. It is now owned by the Metropolitan Borough of Doncaster and houses the Museum of South Yorkshire Life. To the South East of the Hall is Richmond Hill.

=== Town End ===
The eastern part of Sprotbrough, from where Sprotbrough Road meets the A638 and A19 to the bridge over the A1(M) is known as Lower Sprotbrough, and is more suburban. Town End is located at St Mary's Roundabout near Bentley. It was developed from farm land in around 1926 and was part of Bentley with Arksey Urban District until the formation of the Metropolitan Borough of Doncaster under the Local Government Act 1972. The church of St Edmund on Anchorage Lane was built in a converted barn on the former farm land when the area was being developed. Close to the church is the scout hut and Area51 Skate and BMX park, the most popular skatepark in the Doncaster Borough, which is currently looking to extend its facilities.

Town End was formerly the home of the Sprotbrough Foundry, opened by the Ministry of Supply in 1943, which among other things provided parts for tank tracks. After the war the foundry became the property of John Fowler & Co., which became a subsidiary of Marshall, Sons & Co. in 1947. Marshall worked with Fowler to produce a range of tracked agricultural tractors, such as the Track Marshall. The works closed in the early 1980s and the site is occupied by a housing estate whose roads bear the names of some of the machines that were built there.

=== Names ===
From this town of Sprotborough the surname Spreadborough was formed.

== Politics ==
Sprotbrough and Cusworth Parish Council meet at the Goldsmith Centre on Sprotbrough Road and at the Scawsby Community Centre. Since the 2025 election, the parish council has consisted of:

- 4 Labour councillors
- 4 Green councillors
- 3 independent councillors
- 2 Conservative councillors
- 1 British Democrat councillor

One Conservative councillor and one Reform UK councillor represent the Sprotbrough ward on the City of Doncaster Council. The ward also includes surrounding rural villages outside the parish. Cusworth forms part of the Roman Ridge ward, represented by two Reform UK councillors. The ward also includes some northwestern suburbs of Doncaster.

The parish falls under the parliamentary constituency of Doncaster North, represented by Ed Miliband MP.

== Geography ==
=== Amenities ===
A key focal point of Sprotbrough is St Mary's Church, founded in 1176, with a clock tower that has commanding views of the Don Valley.

Schools in the parish include Copley Junior School, Orchard Infant School, Saltersgate Junior and Infants Schools, and Richmond Hill Primary School. The nearest secondary schools is Ridgewood School in Scawsby.

=== Transport ===
Public transport is available in both Sprotbrough and Cusworth. Sprotbrough is served by bus 219 which is operated by Stagecoach Yorkshire. Cusworth is served by the 41 and 41a service operated by First, which runs through Cusworth every 20 minutes.

=== River ===
The village is on the River Don and a weir which is bypassed by Sprotbrough Lock, allowing boats to pass safely. It is close to the A1(M) bridge over the Don. The Trans Pennine Trail follows the river at this point.

Extending to the south-west the River Don flows through Sprotbrough Gorge, a site of special scientific interest (SSSI). The gorge is an important site for rare plants, invertebrates and breeding site for birds. Overall the SSSI covers 76.9 hectares (190.1 acres) and was notified in 1988. Enclosed in this area is Sprotborough Flash Nature Reserve.

=== Parks ===
Sprotbrough has three parks, Anchorage Lane, Sprotbrough Road and New Lane (village). The 'village' (the western part of the parish) has a park which has recently been doubled in size consisting of a football pitch and a children's play area. In June each year, it hosts a gala organised by the local Scout group. The main event in this is the 6.5 km fun run starting and finishing in the park and going through High Melton and Cadeby.

== See also ==
- Listed buildings in Sprotbrough and Cusworth
