= Don Gorge =

Geographical feature in South Yorkshire, England

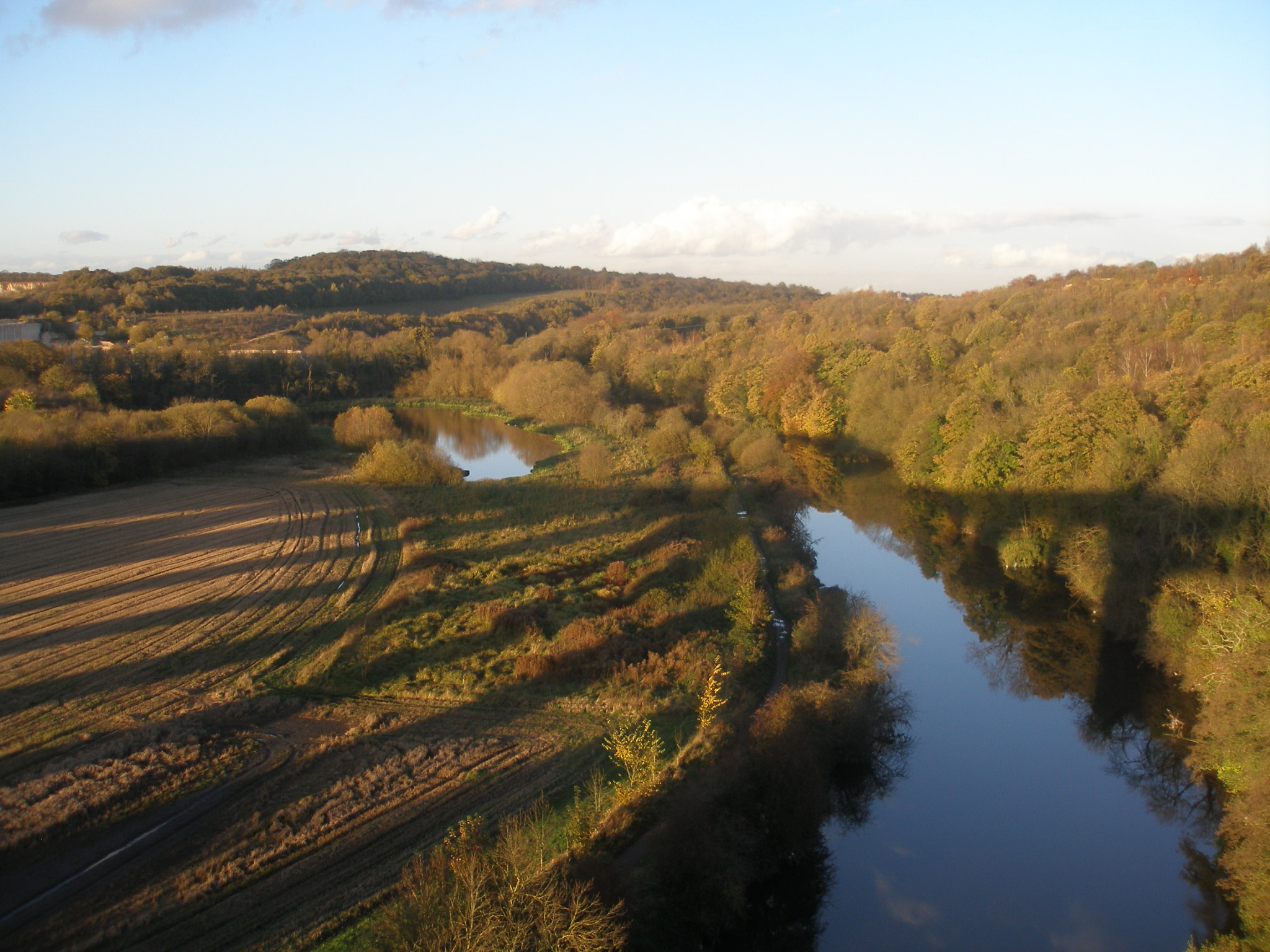
- The River Don Gorge from Conisbrough Viaduct

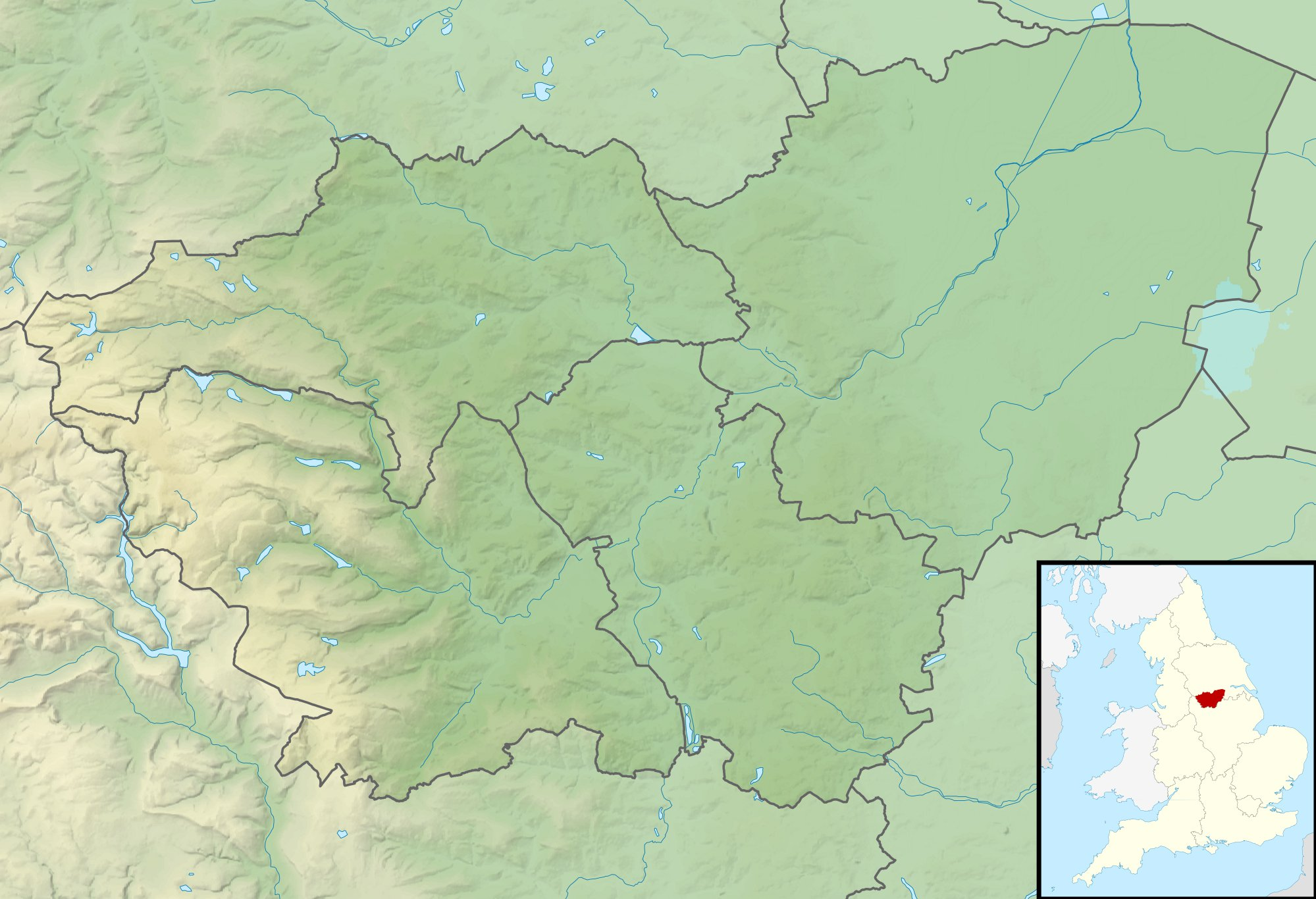
- Location within South Yorkshire

Geography
- Location: South Yorkshire
- Country: England
- State/Province: Yorkshire and the Humber
- Coordinates: 53.502°N 1.192°W
- River: River Don
- Interactive map of Don Gorge

The Don Gorge is the valley of the River Don to the west of Doncaster, south of the village of Sprotbrough. The gorge is known as a 'green corridor'.

A weir is on the river at Sprotbrough, and this is bypassed by a canal with a lock. The abandoned hamlet of Levitt Hagg sits in woodland to the south of the river. The Sprotbrough Flash nature reserve lies adjacent to the river on its north bank.

Boat Lane provides vehicular access into the village; additionally there is a public footpath. Mill Lane connects the Don Gorge with Warmsworth to the south.

== History ==
The Don Gorge is a valley of magnesian limestone, cut through by the water of the River Don. It extends from Conisbrough in the west, to Sprotbrough in the east, ending just before the A1(M) motorway. Animals such as woolly mammoths and rhinoceroses, are evident from bones dug up in the area. These seem to be from the last ice age when meltwater carved out the Don Gorge from the magnesian limestone.

Several hoards of coins and jewelry have been found on both sides of the gorge, though mostly on the south side. This has led to speculation that the gorge was a boundary in the pre-Roman period in Britain, when the gorge was less wooded than it is at present. Sprotbrough Flash formed in 1924, when mining subsidence caused the area to flood. It is now a nature reserve, which opened to the public in 1984.

The presence of the limestone led to quarrying in the gorge, which prompted use of the river to transport the product out. The abandoned village of Levitt Hagg, on the south side of the gorge, is now a landfill site. The villagers left, or were transferred into council houses in Warmsworth and Sprotbrough in the 1950s. Excavations of a weir in 2014/2015 revealed the remains of a mill at Sprotbrough. The weir was being reconditioned into a fish pass.

The Trans-Pennine Trail now traverses the gorge, and the whole valley is known as a 'green corridor' which has seen much investment and cleaning up of the river.
