= Little Canada =

Little Canada may refer to:

- Little Canada (term), a term for any community in the United States to which French Canadians emigrated, particularly in the 1800s and early 1900s
- Little Canada (attraction), a tourist attraction in Toronto, Ontario, Canada
- Little Canada, Minnesota, a city in Ramsey County, Minnesota, United States
- Little Canada, South Yorkshire, a hamlet in England
