= Cusworth =

Suburb of Doncaster, South Yorkshire, England

Coordinates: 53.53004°N 1.17505°W

- Village
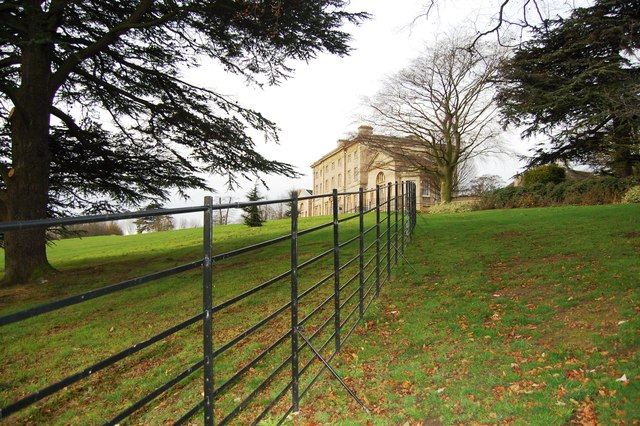
- Cusworth Hall viewed from adjacent parkland

- Location within City of Doncaster Location within South Yorkshire
- Area: 0.93 sq mi (2.4 km^{2})
- Population: 4,728 (2011 census) (Note: Combined area and population of Doncaster 016A, 016B, and 016D census output areas)
  - Density: 5,084/sq mi (1,963/km^{2})
- OS grid reference: SE544050
  - London: 145 mi (233 km) SSE
- Civil parish: Sprotbrough and Cusworth
- Metropolitan borough: City of Doncaster
- Metropolitan county: South Yorkshire
- Region: Yorkshire and the Humber
- Country: England
- Sovereign state: United Kingdom
- Post town: DONCASTER
- Postcode district: DN5
- Dialling code: 01302
- Police: South Yorkshire
- Fire: South Yorkshire
- Ambulance: Yorkshire
- UK Parliament: Doncaster North

Cusworth is a village and suburb of Doncaster in South Yorkshire, England, located 2 miles (3.2 km) to its north-west within the civil parish of Sprotbrough and Cusworth and the City of Doncaster, with a population of 4,728. It is home to Cusworth Hall, an 18th-century country house, and its surrounding parkland. Some buildings in the old village can be dated back to the 16th century.

The village's historic cottages, semi-rural location and situation on the edge of a plateau has led to it sometimes being referred to as ‘a piece of the Cotswolds in Yorkshire’.

== History ==
Cusworth was first recorded as Cuzeuuorde in the Domesday Book of 1086. By 1560, the original manor house and estate belonged to Sir Christopher Wray, who was once Speaker of the House of Commons, and his family. By 1669, it was owned by the Wrightson family. William Wrightson decided in 1740 to build the current Cusworth Hall, which existed as a home for the family until 1961 when the council purchased it and converted it into a museum, which still operates today.

Cusworth has since expanded and is now a relatively affluent commuter village housing professionals working in Doncaster.

== Geography ==
The civil parish of Sprotbrough and Cusworth had a population of 12,134 at the 2011 census.

Cusworth is interwoven with the suburb of Scawsby to the north, and separated from Bentley and Scawthorpe to the east by the A638 dual carriageway. Cusworth Park and agricultural land separate it from Sprotbrough to the south. To the west is rural countryside protected from development by the South and West Yorkshire Green Belt; the A1(M) motorway (Doncaster Bypass) is not far from the village's western edge. Cusworth Lane is the main thoroughfare through Cusworth running from the A638 and eventually connecting with Sprotbrough. It bypasses the ancient village centre, which is accessed via a narrow one-way system.

== Amenities ==
It hosts several local amenities, including a convenience store, public house (The Mallard) and an Italian restaurant. Within the grounds of Cusworth Hall, there is a bistro and a microbrewery. Larger amenities can be found in neighbouring suburbs.

Cusworth is served by the 41 bus service between the Doncaster Frenchgate Interchange and Scawsby, operated by First. The nearest railway stations are in Bentley and Doncaster.

== Governance ==
As part of the Roman Ridge council ward, which also includes Scawsby, it elects two councillors to the City of Doncaster Council. The Cusworth ward of Sprotbrough and Cusworth Parish Council elects four councillors to the parish council and covers the north of Cusworth. The Stadium ward currently has two councillors on the parish council and covers the southern half of Cusworth.

== Gallery ==
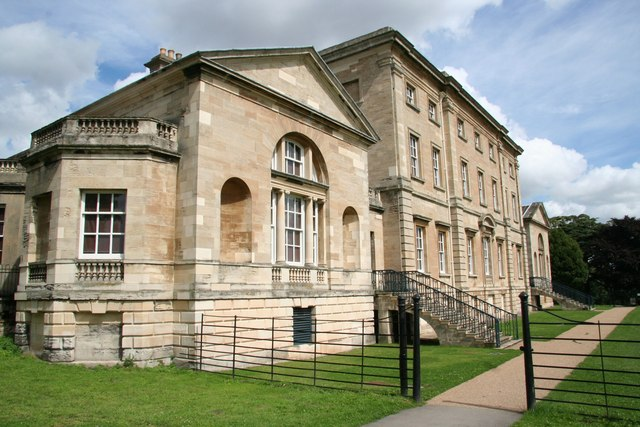
Cusworth Hall

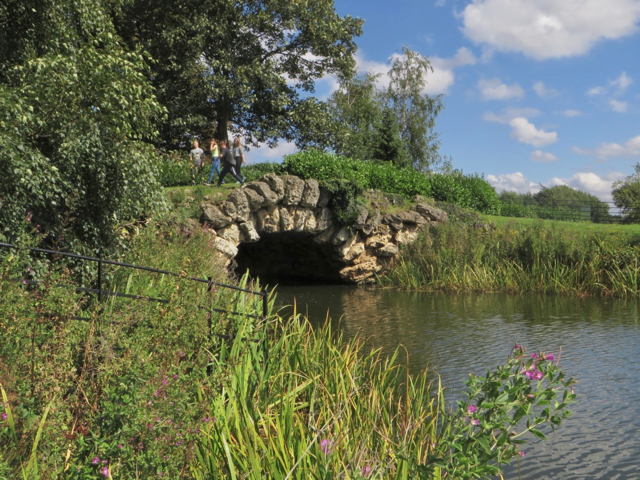
Entry to the boathouse on the Upper Fish Pond

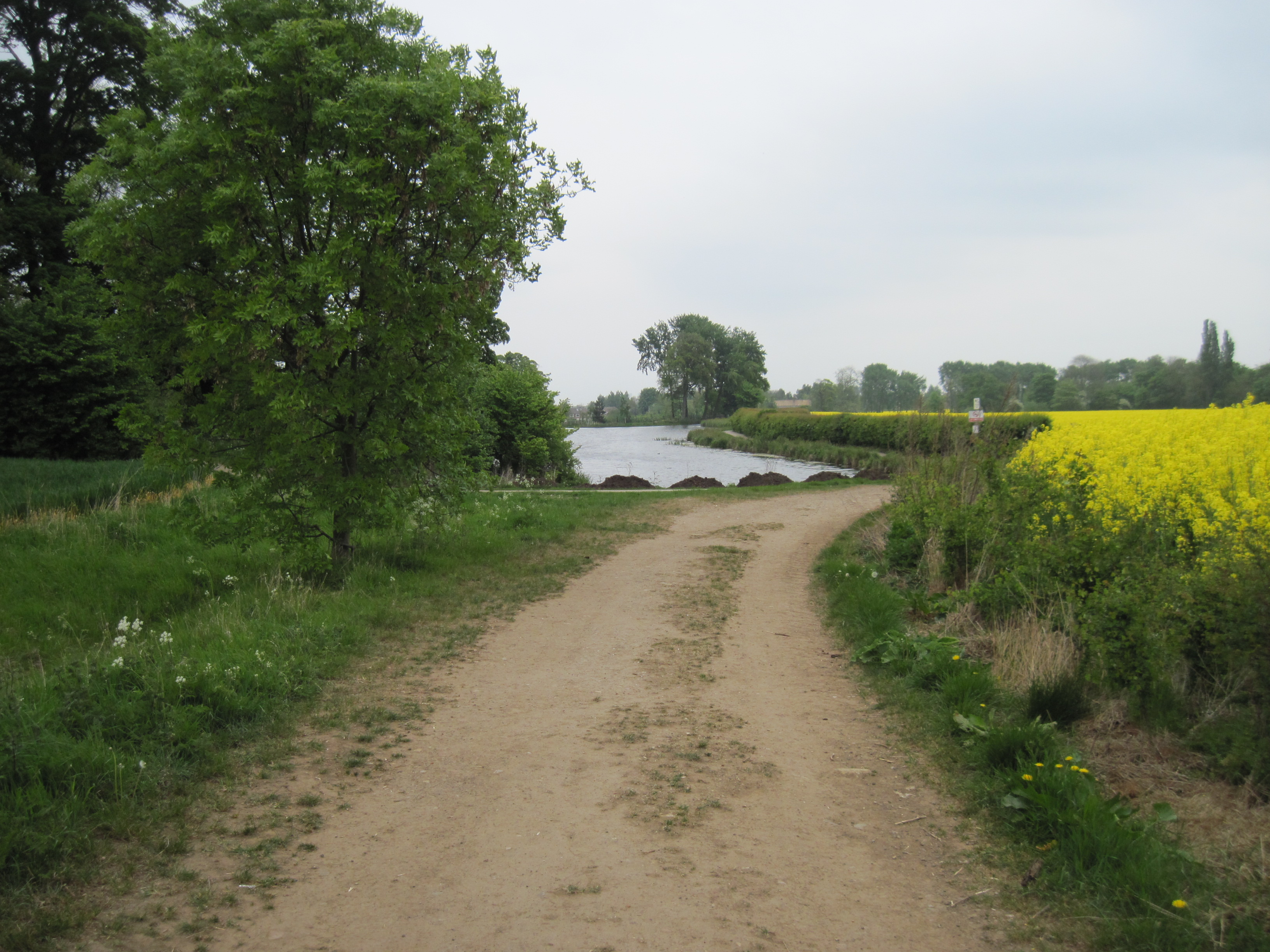
Footpath to Sprotbrough with the Upper Fish Pond visible

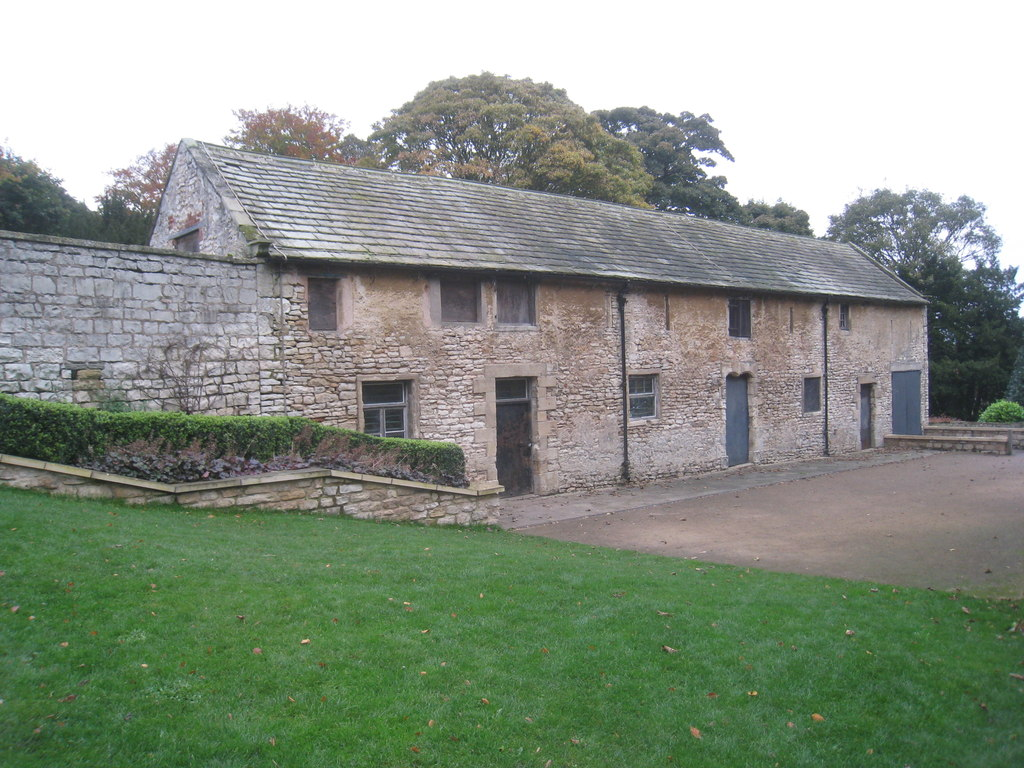
Stables in Cusworth Park

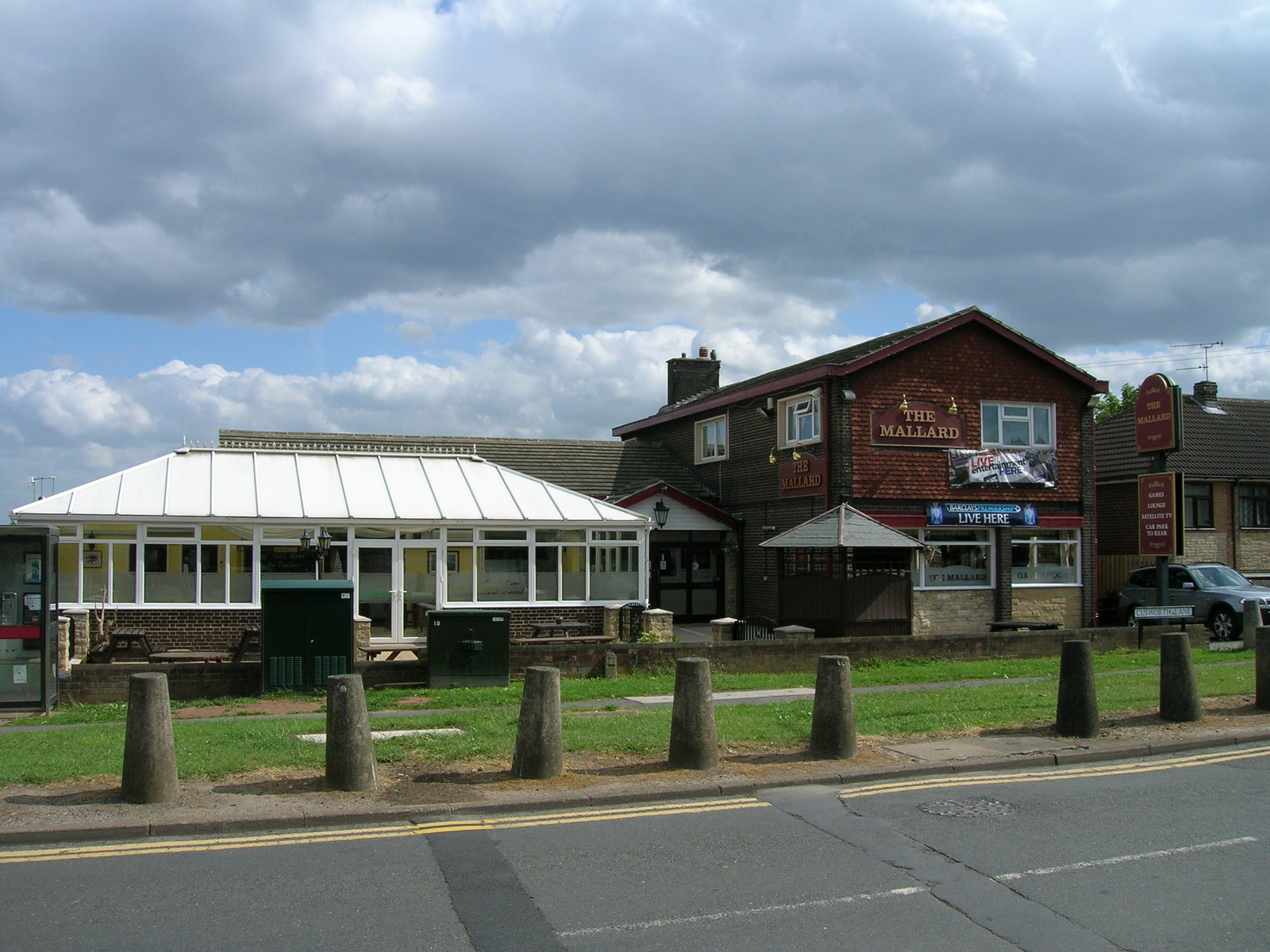
The Mallard public house
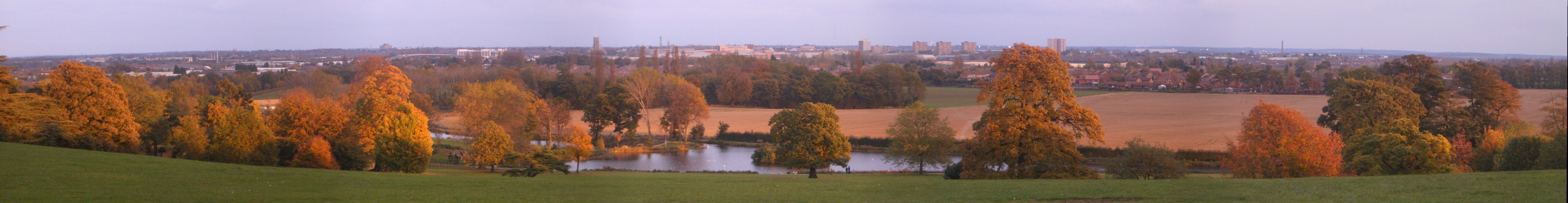
Panoramic view from Cusworth Hall - from foreground to background: ornamental lake, woodland and agricultural land, Sprotbrough, Doncaster

== See also ==
- Listed buildings in Sprotbrough and Cusworth
