= Listed buildings in Sprotbrough and Cusworth =

Sprotbrough and Cusworth is a civil parish in the metropolitan borough of Doncaster, South Yorkshire, England. The parish contains 21 listed buildings that are recorded in the National Heritage List for England. Of these, two are listed at Grade I, the highest of the three grades, and the others are at Grade II, the lowest grade. The parish contains the villages of Sprotbrough and Cusworth, and the surrounding countryside. In the parish is Cusworth Hall, which is listed together with associated structures in the grounds and in Cusworth Park. The other listed buildings include two churches, a cross base, a farmhouse converted into a public house, the remains of a pump house, houses and associated structures, a mounting block, a village pump, a former toll house, and a telephone kiosk.

== Key ==
Grade	Criteria
I	Particularly important buildings of more than special interest
II	Buildings of national importance and special interest

== Buildings ==
Name and location	Photograph	Date	Notes	Grade
St Mary's Church, Sprotbrough; 53.51226°N 1.18785°W		Late 12th century	The church was altered and extended through the centuries, and was restored and reordered in 1912–15 by Ninian Comper. It is built in limestone with asphalt roofs, and consists of a nave with a clerestory, north and south aisles, north and south porches, a chancel with a north vestry and a west tower. The lower part of the tower dates from the 14th century, and has diagonal buttresses, an ogee-headed west doorway a two-light window and a lozenge-shaped clock face. The upper part is Perpendicular and two-light bell openings, and a parapet with blind tracery, gargoyles and pinnacles. The nave and the aisles have embattled parapets.	I
Cross base 53.51463°N 1.19034°W	—	Late medieval (probable)	The cross base, which has been moved from a previous site, is in limestone. It is about 0.75 metres (2 ft 6 in) square, and has a chamfered top edge and a square socket.	II
Boat Inn; 53.50663°N 1.19226°W		17th century	A farmhouse altered in the 19th century and later converted into a public house, it is in limestone, with quoins, stone slate eaves courses, and a pantile roof with moulded gable copings and shaped kneelers. There are mainly two storeys, five bays, a projecting wing on the left, a single-bay extension on the right, and a rear outshut. In the recessed central part is a Tudor arched doorway, the right bay projects and is gabled with a plaque in the gable, and in the angle with the extension is a porch with a Tudor arched doorway. The windows are mullioned and transomed, most of the openings have square-sectioned hood moulds, and the windows are latticed casements.	II
Bowling House and walls, Cusworth Park; 53.52918°N 1.17306°W	—	c. 17th century	The bowling house is in stone with quoins, and has a rectangular plan, a single storey and a basement. It contains a doorway and a window with moulded surrounds, and a mullioned window. The walls enclose a bowling green and a kitchen garden; most are in brick with stone coping, and some are in stone.	II
The Manor House; 53.53051°N 1.17396°W	—	17th century	A limestone farmhouse with quoins, stone slate eaves courses, and a double-span pantile roof with coped gables and shaped kneelers. There are two storeys and three bays. The central doorway has a chamfered and quoined surround, and an arched soffit to the lintel, and the windows are mullioned.	II
The Old Rectory; 53.51164°N 1.18969°W		17th century	The rectory was refashioned in the 1840s by H. F. Lockwood who added fronts in Tudor Revival style. The rectory is stuccoed and has corbelled parapets, and a stone slate roof with coped gables and a finial. There are two storeys and fronts of three bays. The middle bay of the entrance front is gabled and projects, and contains a porch with angle buttresses that rise as pinnacles, and a doorway with a moulded surround and sunken spandrels. In the outer bays are mullioned windows with chamfered surrounds, Tudor arched lights, and hood moulds. In the garden front the middle bay is recessed, it contains a French window, and below the parapet is blind tracery. The outer bays are gabled and contain two-storey canted bay windows.	II
Gates to Home Cottage; 53.51217°N 1.18863°W	—	Late 17th century	The decorative gate, piers, and flanking columns are in wrought iron. The gate has ornate cresting, and the piers are in openwork, and surmounted by crowns. Outside are panels with similar decoration to the gate.	II
Manor Cottage; 53.53075°N 1.17338°W	—	Late 17th century (probable)	The house is in limestone, with quoins, stone slate eaves courses, and a pantile roof with coped gables and shaped kneelers. There are two storeys and three bays, the right bay projecting and gabled. The doorway has a chamfered quoined surround and a Tudor arched lintel. The windows are double-chamfered and mullioned, and there are two half-dormers.	II
Remains of Pump House; 53.50994°N 1.18629°W	—	1703	The pump was designed by George Sorocold. The remains include limestone walls, a square sunken chamber, and a wheel pit. The water inlet has angled walls and a segmental arch. At a higher level is an enclosure containing a shaft with a crank and a flywheel.	II
St Edmund's Church, Sprotbrough; 53.52912°N 1.15323°W		17th or 18th century	An agricultural building, it was converted into a church in 1954 by G. G. Pace, extended in 1963, and has been redundant since 2009. It is in magnesian limestone and buff and red brick, and has a red pantile roof. The church is at the west end, a former youth centre at the east end, and a vestry and meeting room on the north side. In the church are four rows of five windows, and four clerestory windows above. On the west gable is a cross, and on the roof between the two parts is a bellcote. In the right part are two doorways and a long row of clerestory windows.	II
Stable block and bothy, Cusworth Hall; 53.52956°N 1.17675°W		Early 18th century (probable)	The building is in limestone, with quoins, and a stone slate roof with coped gables and shaped kneelers. There are two storeys and rear outshuts. It contains doorways with chamfered surrounds, one also with a moulded surround, and casement windows.	II
Cusworth Hall; 53.52903°N 1.17711°W		1740–45	A country house designed by George Platt in Palladian style, with pavilion wings added in 1749–53 by James Paine, and later used for other purposes. It is in stone with hipped slate roofs, and has three storeys and a semi-basement. The entrance front has six bays, the garden front has seven bays and is flanked by single-storey single-bay pavilions, and the flanking service wings have five bays. The middle two bays of the entrance front project under a pediment, the bays are divided by quoin strips rising to giant Doric pilasters, and the outer bays have a full entablature. In the centre two flights of balustraded steps lead up to a doorway with a fanlight flanked by casement windows, all in a Doric Venetian surround, and above is an Ionic Venetian window. The other windows are sashes in architraves. The garden front has a rusticated basement, and the middle three bays project under a pediment. The pavilions each has a central round arch containing an Ionic tripartite window and a Diocletian window above, and are flanked by semi-domed niches. On the return of the left pavilion is a canted bay window, and on the right pavilion is a chapel apse.	I
Lodge, walls and gates, Cusworth Hall; 53.53027°N 1.17846°W		Mid 18th century	The lodge spanning the entrance to the drive is in limestone on a plinth, with quoins, a cornice, a blocking course, and a hipped Welsh slate roof. There are two storeys and three bays, the middle bay containing a round-arched carriage entrance, with rusticated quoins, and containing iron gates. Each outer bay contains a sash window in the ground floor, and a casement window above. The lodge has flanking concave coped wing walls ending in piers with cornices.	II
Boathouse, Cusworth Park; 53.52856°N 1.17291°W		Mid 18th century	The boathouse is at the northern end of the Upper Fish Pond. It is in limestone and boulders, and has a segmental-arched entrance. This leads to a round-headed vaulted recess rusticated by pendant through-stones. It is covered by a landscaped mound.	II
Mounting steps 53.51220°N 1.18850°W	—	18th century (probable)	The mounting block by the entrance to the churchyard of St Mary's Church is in limestone. It has a platform of large blocks, which is approached by four steps from each side.	II
Sprotbrough Park Stables; 53.51189°N 1.18693°W	—	Mid 18th century	The former stable block to Sprotbrough Hall is in roughcast and stuccoed limestone, on a plinth, and has quoins. The entrance gateway and the end pavilions have two storeys, there are single-storey three-bay links, and wings to the rear of each pavilion. The gateway has a pedimented gable, and contains a round arch with an impost band, an archivolt, and a keystone. The pavilions have oversailing eaves and pyramidal roofs, and the links and wings contain sash windows.	II
The Mistal; 53.53065°N 1.17364°W	—	Mid 18th century	A cowhouse converted into a house, it is in limestone, with tile eaves courses, and a pantile roof with coped gables and shaped kneelers. There is one storey and five bays. The doorway has a chamfered quoined surround and a Tudor arched lintel. The windows are casements, and there are blocked slit vents. The right bay is gabled and contains a segmental-arched entry with a quoined surround and a keystone, and in the gable is a quatrefoil.	II
Keeper's Cottage and Kennels, Cusworth Park; 53.52940°N 1.16883°W		Late 18th to early 19th century	The cottage is in rendered limestone, with stone slate eaves courses, and a pantile roof with shaped gable coping and moulded kneelers. There are two storeys and four bays. The mullioned windows and doorways have hood moulds. In the corners of the yard are former kennels in rendered stone, and they are ruinous.	II
Village pump 53.51104°N 1.18990°W	—	Early 19th century	The surround of the pump is in limestone, and the pump is in cast iron. The remains of the pump shaft are in a cuboidal stone bucket platform, in a gabled recess flanked by projecting piers. Above the platform is a sandstone plaque carved with a coat of arms, and over the surround is a moulded cornice.	II
The Toll House; 53.50803°N 1.19064°W		1849	The former toll house is in sandstone on a plinth, with chamfered quoins, a frieze, deep cornice and blocking course, and an asphalt roof. There is a single storey and three bays. The middle bay projects and contains a doorway with an architrave, and in the outer bays are casement windows with architraves and moulded sills.	II
Telephone kiosk 53.51218°N 1.18855°W	—	1935	A K6 type telephone kiosk, designed by Giles Gilbert Scott. Constructed in cast iron with a square plan and a dome, it has three unperforated crowns in the top panels.	II
