= Pennington Flash Country Park =

Country park in Greater Manchester, England

Coordinates: 53°29′10″N 2°32′50″W

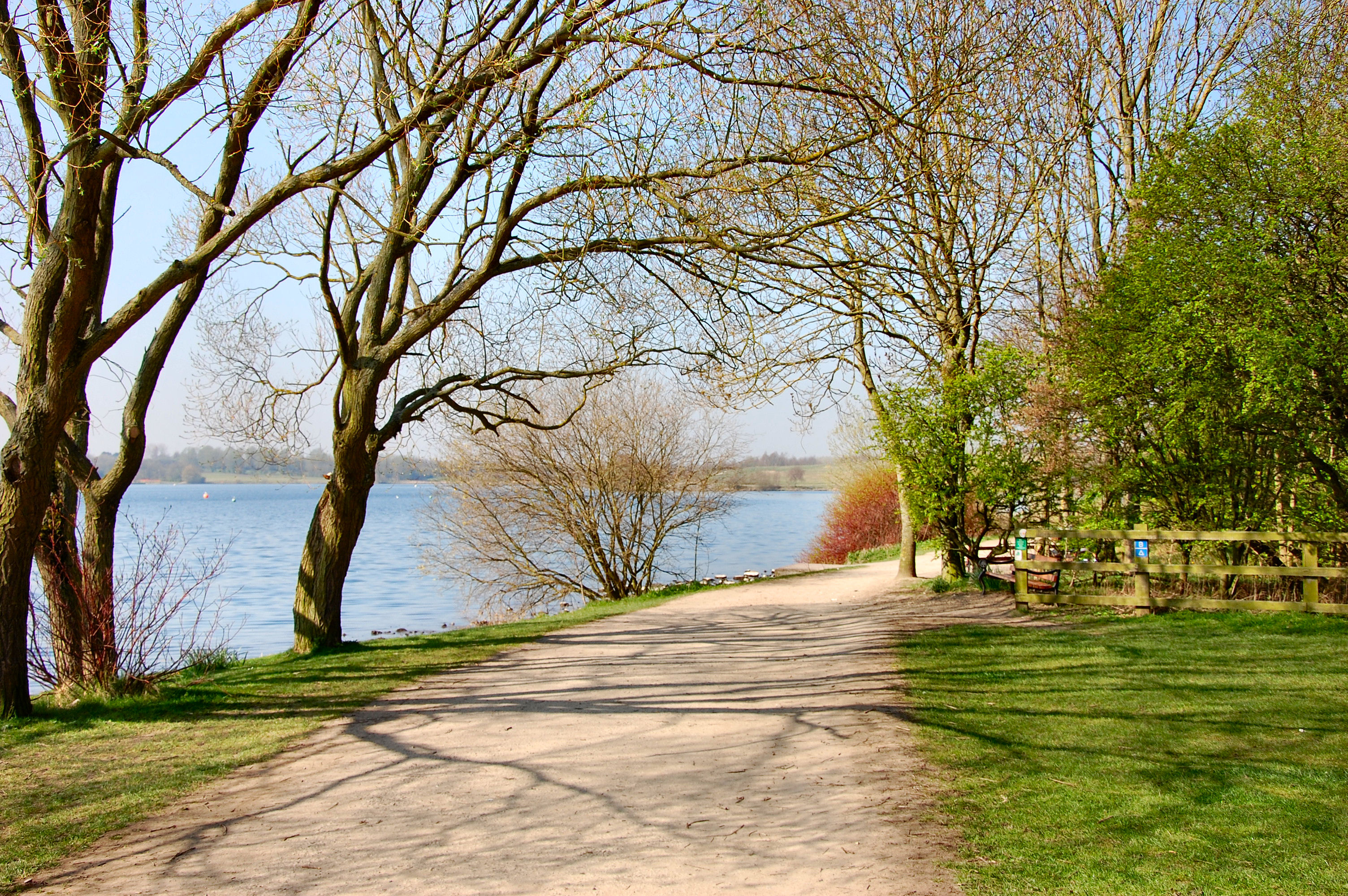
- Interactive map of Pennington Flash Country Park
- Type: Country park
- Location: Leigh, Greater Manchester
- Operator: Wigan Council
- Open: All year

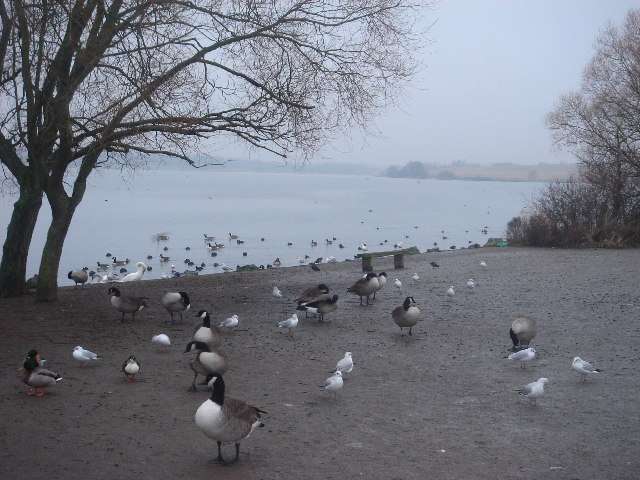
Birdlife at Pennington Flash

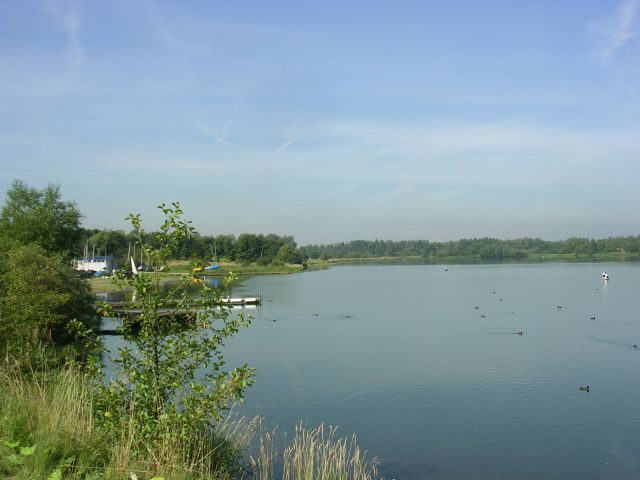
The Flash

Pennington Flash Country Park is a 200-hectare (490-acre) country park located between Lowton and Leigh in Greater Manchester, England.

== History ==
A flash is a water-filled hollow formed by subsidence. Pennington Flash is a 70-hectare (170-acre) lake created at the beginning of the 20th century by coal mining subsidence, mainly from Bickershaw Colliery. Before the flash the area contained two farms, both of which were abandoned in the early 1900s due to flooding. During the 1960s and 1970s the idea to convert the flash for recreation was emerging and the country park was opened in 1981.

== Nature ==
Pennington Flash Country Park is a nature reserve. Over 230 bird species have been recorded on site including black-faced bunting, nightingale, marsh harrier, spoonbill and Leach's storm-petrel. Additionally, a wide variety of butterflies, dragonflies and damselflies can be spotted in the area.

== Facilities ==
Facilities include a small information centre, Pennington Flash café, a nine-hole municipal golf course, a car park with electric vehicle charging points, a children's play area, toilets, picnic and recreation areas, eight bird hides, fishing on certain shores, sailing, windsurfing and rowing through Leigh and Lowton Sailing Club. There is a network of tracks and footpaths suitable for walkers, cyclists, horse riders, joggers and wheelchair users. A Parkrun takes place every Saturday morning.

A course here would have been the venue for rowing and canoeing if the Manchester bid for the 2000 Summer Olympics had been successful.
