= Flash (lake) =

Type of lake

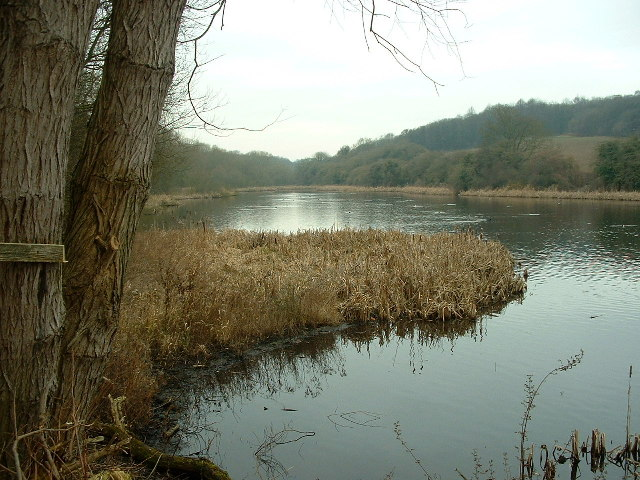
Sprotbrough Flash, near Doncaster, England

A flash is a body of water that forms where the land below it has subsided. Whilst these are mostly found in areas where mining has taken place, some can occur naturally.

== History ==
Flash is recorded as being a dialectal word from Cheshire describing the water-filled depressions caused by subsidence. Some have said that word was used as far back as the 17th century when describing small bodies of water across Cheshire, and was derived from a French word for puddle (today's flaque). Another writer states the "Flash or Plash, deriving from splash, are small puddles left over after a thunderstorm". In William Gresley's book A Glossary of Terms Used in Coal-Mining, Gresley states that the word originated in the salt mining districts of Cheshire and defines it as

A subsidence of the surface due to the working of rock salt and pumping of brine.

Flashes are common in former mining areas such as Cheshire, Lancashire and Yorkshire, where mining has had an effect on the landscape. In Cheshire especially, rock salt and brine extraction beneath the ground has had a profound effect on the surface, creating flashes even some time after the human involvement has ended. A similar result has occurred in certain areas of Worcestershire, such as at Upton Warren, where the flash is a result of brine extraction too.

The industrial extraction of salt, or the abstraction of it by natural causes, has a greater effect on the depth of the flashes than those in former coal mining areas. The removal of minerals is usually maintained by use of supports to stop the tunnels or caves collapsing. In coal mining, the normal procedure in the 18th, 19th and early 20th centuries was to install wooden pit props; historically, however, the industrial mining of rock salt used a room and pillar (or pillar and stall) method, with salt pillars supporting the roof. But when water finds its way into such salt workings, it erodes the salt pillars supporting the roof, making the ceiling area collapse and causing subsidence to a greater depth. (Note: The modern way of pumping brine, known as brine pumping, is to inject water under carefully controlled conditions which creates stable cavities which does not lead to subsidence on the surface. Some of these cavities are now used to store natural gas in the summer for use during the winter.)

Brine extraction underneath the River Weaver in Cheshire accounted for the development of several lakes along the course of the river. During the Great subsidence of 1880, flashes appeared across the salt mining district on a daily basis. One of the largest, Witton Flash in Northwich, was listed by Ordnance Survey mapping to have been created between 1890 and 1897, with a measurement of the surface water dated also. This was to indicate that the water had not finished filling the void, and the ground beneath was still in the process of settling. Along the same watercourse just upstream is Winsford, where the river filled three voids now known as the Top, Middle and Bottom Flashes. During the late 19th and early 20th century, the chemical companies mining the salt dumped waste chemicals in the flashes.

Brine and salt extraction in the Davenham area of Cheshire has also led to flashes being created on the Trent and Mersey Canal. One of the flashes here (Billinge Green Flash) has been turned into a marina.

Coal extraction in Lancashire has resulted in flashes occurring in and around Leigh such as Pennington Flash Country Park, which now covers over 70 acres (28 ha) with the park being over 200 acres (80 ha). Similarly, in Yorkshire, Sprotborough Flash is the result of magnesian limestone extraction. The flash was created around 1900, but in 1990, the Environment Agency turned the flash into an overflow lake for the River Don when it was under flood conditions. Several other flashes have been created or are created when the River Don is in spate.

Other flashes caused by mining subsidence are at Fairburn Ings along the River Aire. Previously, the area around Fairburn had been a wetland in medieval times, but was drained to provide agricultural land. The name ing itself means wet field, and alludes to its previous habitat before human intervention. Another flash in Yorkshire is at Catcliffe, which filled when sub-surface mining caused the land to drop and get filled by water from the River Rother. (Note: The local population believe that the name of the lake should be Catcliffe Ings, reflecting other sites in Yorkshire that have Ings in their name; Broomhill Ings, Denaby Ings, Fairburn Ings and Mickleton Ings.)

Several flashes occur in Hellifield in North Yorkshire, but these are field ponds, which are the result of low-lying land filling with water. The flashes at Hellifield are known for attracting a large variety of migratory wildfowl.

== See also ==
- Sandbach Flashes
- Sprotbrough Flash
- Glaze Brook
- Pennington Flash Country Park
