= Levitt Hagg =

Abandoned hamlet in South Yorkshire, England

Coordinates: 53.5°N 1.18°W

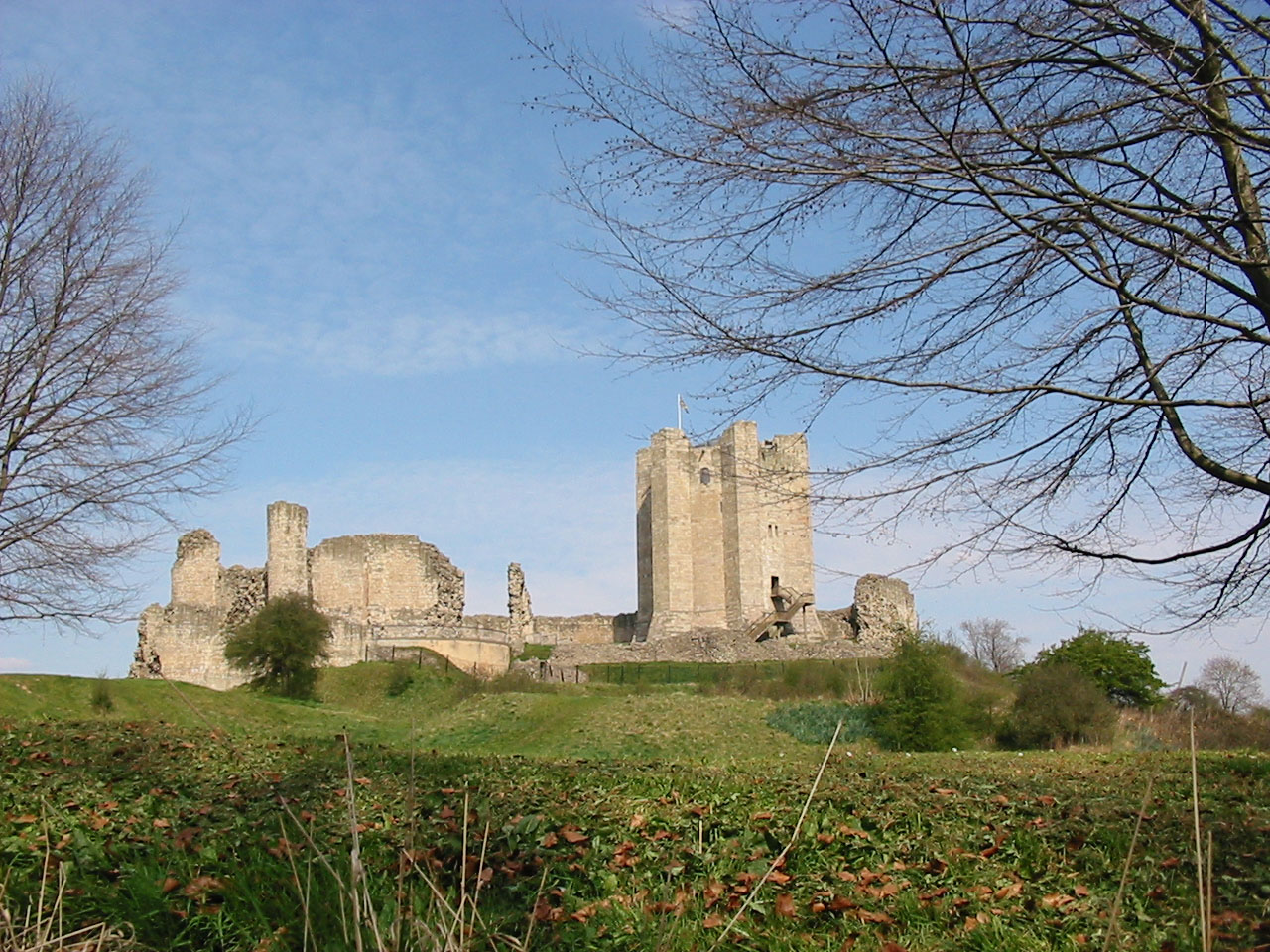
- Conisbrough Castle, likely built with limestone quarried at Levitt Hagg

- Location within South Yorkshire
- OS grid reference: SE 53824 01060
- Civil parish: Warmsworth
- Metropolitan borough: Doncaster
- Metropolitan county: South Yorkshire
- Region: Yorkshire and the Humber
- Country: England
- Sovereign state: United Kingdom
- Post town: Doncaster
- Postcode district: DN4
- Dialling code: 01302
- Police: South Yorkshire
- Fire: South Yorkshire
- Ambulance: Yorkshire

Levitt Hagg (sometimes spelled Levit Hagg or Levett Hagg) is an abandoned hamlet in South Yorkshire, located approximately two miles southwest of Doncaster and near Conisbrough Castle. Limestone began to be quarried at the site in ancient times. Levitt Hagg was also the site, along with nearby environs in the Don Gorge, of ancient woodlands rich in yew trees. The old settlement of Levitt Hagg was removed in the 1950s.

== Toponymy ==
The settlement took its name from Hagg, an archaic word which meant 'broken ground in a bog,' and from the Levett family, an Anglo-Norman family prominent in Yorkshire for centuries.

== History ==
The River Don valley, in which the settlement was situated, was a site given to limestone formations which lent themselves to early mining for building purposes. The area in which Levitt Hagg is located was known as Conisbrough Cliffs and was composed of two quarries: Near Cliff, which had been exhausted by 1791; and "Far Cliff" which included the long-gone early industrial hamlet of Levitt Hagg. Limestone from the quarries at Levitt Hagg, which had a vertical height of 75 feet, has been widely used in building in the South Yorkshire area since medieval times. The soft dolomite limestone from the banks of the Don east of Conisbrough made ideal building material, which yielded profits for some. An account book from the mid-eighteenth century records the expenses of quarrying limestone at the site, which belonged at that time to the Battie-Wrightson family of Cusworth. As well as quarrying operations, barges to be used on the canals were also built on the bank by the village, the first one being completed in 1886. Boat building was abandoned in 1901. The only surviving evidence of industrial activity are abandoned lime kilns, the upper portions of which are still visible. Today Levitt Hagg is the site of an abandoned quarry and landfill site, providing refuge for four species of bats, including whiskered, long-eared, Daubenton's and Natterer's. (The bats and their habitat are protected by law.)

== Village ==
The village of Levitt Hagg began to grow around 1815 when the company of Lockwood, Blagden and Kemp constructed six cottages, known locally as 'White Row.' Four more houses had been constructed before 1851 when, according to the 1851 census, the dwellings were occupied by 60 people. During 1875, six more houses were constructed. Each one contained a living room, two bedrooms, an attic and a kitchen. At this time the village population was nearly 100, and in 1878 a small Mission Hall cum Reading Room was built on a site given by Cusworth Hall Estate owner William Battie-Wrightson.

During 1925, the County Medical Officer made a report on the sanitary conditions at Levitt Hagg, and his findings were that many of the houses were in a state of disrepair, water had to be obtained from wells and drainage was discharged into the river and whenever the river overflowed the houses were prone to flooding. The insanitary conditions and the badly polluted state of the river led to all the Levitt Hagg houses being condemned as unfit for occupation and by 1957 the area had been cleared.

== Landfill site ==
The Levitt Hagg landfill site is run by Waste Recycling Group who have restored 2 acres to calcareous grassland and installed equipment to supply gas from the site to the grid.
