= Little Canada, South Yorkshire =

Hamlet in South Yorkshire, England

Coordinates: 53.547°N 1.191°W

Little Canada
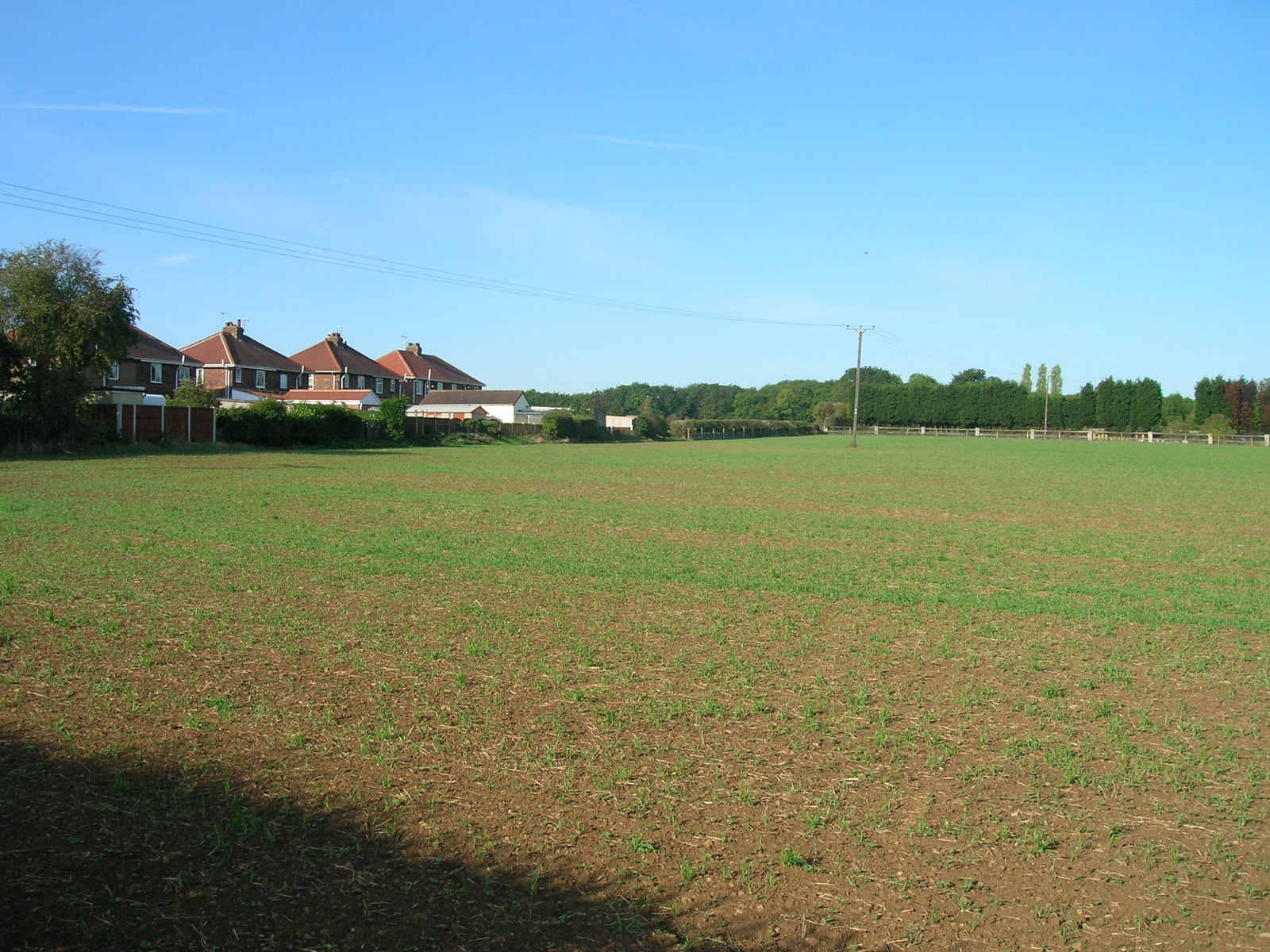
- Farmland in Little Canada

- Location within City of Doncaster Location within South Yorkshire
- Population: 259
- OS grid reference: SE5505
  - London: 145 mi (233 km) SSE
- Civil parish: Brodsworth
- Metropolitan borough: Doncaster
- Metropolitan county: South Yorkshire
- Region: Yorkshire and the Humber
- Country: England
- Sovereign state: United Kingdom
- Post town: DONCASTER
- Postcode district: DN5
- Dialling code: 01302
- Police: South Yorkshire
- Fire: South Yorkshire
- Ambulance: Yorkshire
- UK Parliament: Doncaster North

Little Canada is a hamlet in the City of Doncaster in South Yorkshire, England. It is situated on the B6422 road between Brodsworth and Scawthorpe, approximately 4 miles (6.4 km) north-west of Doncaster city centre.

The Scawthorpe subdivision within the Adwick le Street built-up area, which only includes Little Canada and not the bulk of Scawthorpe, had a population of 259 at the 2011 census.

== History ==
It was built in the 20th century and most of the houses were made of wood. This, along with the surrounding open flat plateau, resembled the Canadian Prairies; hence the name, Little Canada.

== Geography ==
It is a small, linear settlement consisting of several houses surrounded by countryside. It is located along Green Lane adjacent to the Roman Ridge, with Scawsby Lane going to Scawsby to the south.

It is within the Sprotbrough ward of Doncaster Metropolitan Borough Council which elected two Conservative councillors.
