= Sprotbrough Flash =

Nature reserve in England

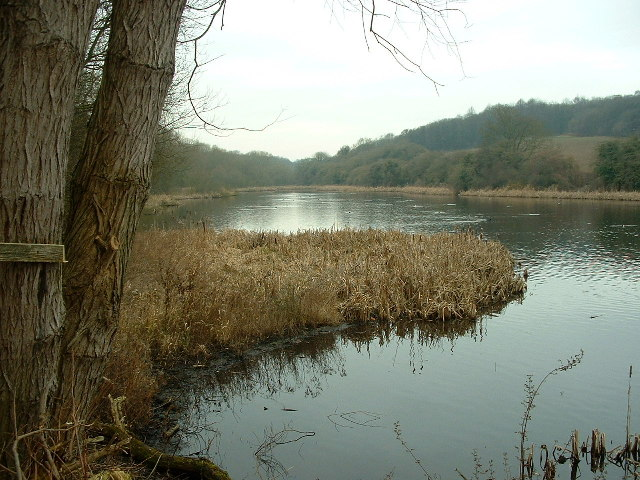
- The eponymous body of water

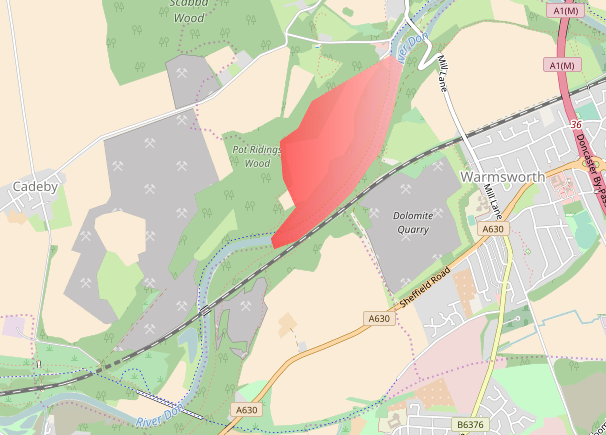
- Type: Nature reserve
- Location: South Yorkshire
- Nearest city: Doncaster
- OS grid: SE 536 013
- Coordinates: 53.5016°N 1.1948°W
- Area: 28 hectares (69 acres)
- Operator: Yorkshire Wildlife Trust
- Website: http://www.ywt.org.uk/reserves/sprotbrough-flash-nature-reserve

Sprotbrough Flash is a nature reserve south of Sprotbrough near Doncaster, South Yorkshire, on the north bank of the River Don. It is named after its main feature, a long, water-filled depression parallel to the river. The reserve is managed by the Yorkshire Wildlife Trust. It overlaps with Sprotbrough Gorge, a Site of Special Scientific Interest. The size of the protected area is 28 hectares (0.28 square kilometers). The Trans Pennine Trail passes through the area.

== History ==
Two hundred and eighty million years ago, during the Permian period, dolomite (magnesium limestone) formed here. This has been mined since the mid-19th century. Mining has since stopped and wildlife has returned to this area. The original quarry can still be seen opposite the River Don, adjacent to the Sprotbrough Flash lake.

Worthy of note, the woolly rhinoceros lived in this area in the Pleistocene. Bones from this creature have been discovered here.

The long lake from which the name of the reserve is derived is the result of subsidence caused by the collapse of old coal mines.

== Wildlife ==
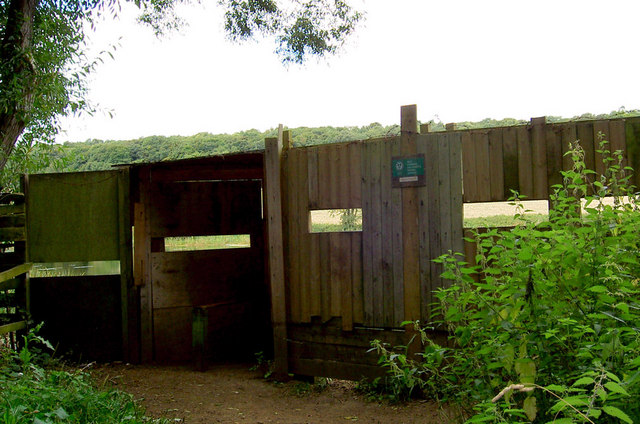
Observation screen on the lake

Sightings of a range of bird and land life have been noted here. The fauna includes common kingfishers, brown hare, grass snakes, Eurasian bitterns, ruddy darters, and the great crested grebe. Plant life includes common twayblade, common spotted orchid, spindle, small leaved lime, woodruff, greater stitchwort, sanicle, and the early purple orchid.
