= Ridgewood School =

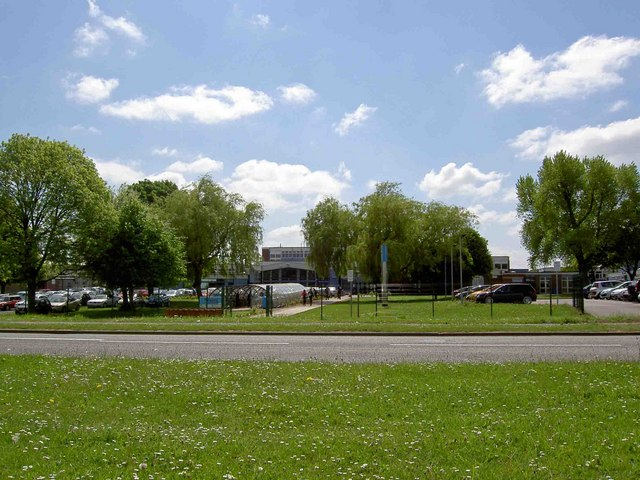
- Ridgewood School viewed from the A635 road

Location
- Barnsley Road; Scawsby; Doncaster, South Yorkshire, DN5 7UB; England; 53.538688°N 1.182446°W

Information
- Type: Academy
- Established: 20 October 1968
- Local authority: Doncaster
- Specialist: Engineering
- Department for Education URN: 137603 Tables
- Ofsted: Reports
- Head teacher: Andy Bridge
- Gender: Mixed
- Age: 11 to 19
- Enrolment: 1,410
- Colours: Black Blue Green and Purple
- Website: http://www.ridgewoodschool.co.uk/

Ridgewood School is a coeducational secondary school with academy status in Scawsby, Doncaster, England. The school gained academy status in October 2011, and was a specialist Engineering College prior to September 2015.

== Catchment area ==
The School accepts pupils from the surrounding areas of Sprotbrough, Sprotbrough village (or Upper Sprotbrough) with Copley Junior School and Richmond Hill Primary School, Cusworth with Saltersgate Infants and Junior School, Barnburgh and Marr with Barnburgh Primary, and Scawsby with Rosedale Primary all leading on to Ridgewood. Pupils from Upper Sprotbrough who previously attended Outwood (formerly Adwick Secondary School), are now in the catchment area of Ridgewood.

== Curriculum ==
Lessons: Ridgewood School teaches lessons in Geography, Music, History, French, Spanish, Art, ICT, Science, Maths, RE, PE, Technology, Food Tech, English, and Drama.

The school also caters for 6th formers with courses including engineering, computing and construction. It competes in sporting and non-sporting events including track and field running, cross country, football and netball.

== Location ==
Ridgewood School neighbours the New Stone Hill School, a specialist school which was formerly the Anchorage School, and before that, a teacher training college. It has an open playing field towards the back of the site alongside Ridgewood's open P.E. fields, which are both surrounded by open fields used for agriculture. To one side of the playing field is an abandoned railway line which runs through Scawsby and Sprotbrough.

Travel to the school is provided via the school buses, the 540, which collects students from Sprotbrough village, the 541, which collects students from Lower Sprotbrough, and the 542, which collects students from Barnburgh. A late bus is also provided in the afternoons, which leaves at 16:00.

The school lies on Barnsley Road (A635) which is the main Barnsley - Doncaster link road which passes through villages like Hickleton, Goldthorpe, Darfield etc.

== School performance ==
Ridgewood Academy performs above the local authority average in Doncaster's league tables for GCSE results, achieving an attainment 8 score of 48.4 in 2022, compared to the local average of 44.7. Progress 8 is around both the local, and national average.

In the school's March 2019 Ofsted report, both the lower school and sixth form were judged 'Requires Improvement'.

In the most recent inspection in December 2022, the school was ranked 'Good' in all categories.

== Notable alumni ==
- Mark Fletcher, Member of Parliament for Bolsover (2019-2024)
