= Roman Ridge =

Bridleway in South Yorkshire, England

Coordinates: 53.546°N 1.185°W

Roman Ridge is a bridleway that was part of the Roman road of Ermine Street, between Scawsby and Redhouse to the north of Doncaster, England.

This footpath departs from the A638 road at The Sun junction with the A635 (or Barnsley Road). Its course runs at an angle bisecting the angle made between the two modern roads. It runs to the west of the A638, roughly parallel to it, through the area of Sunnyfields and on to cross Green Lane, Scawsby on the eastern edge of Little Canada. From there it runs along the western edge of the villages of Highfields and Woodlands until it reaches the Red House junction of the Great North Road. From there, the Roman Ridge joins the A1 (Great North Road) as far as Barnsdale.

The Roman Ridge is colloquially known as the Roman Rigg, or ridge
