= Sprotbrough =

Village in South Yorkshire, England

Coordinates: 53.5119763°N 1.1881056°W

- Village
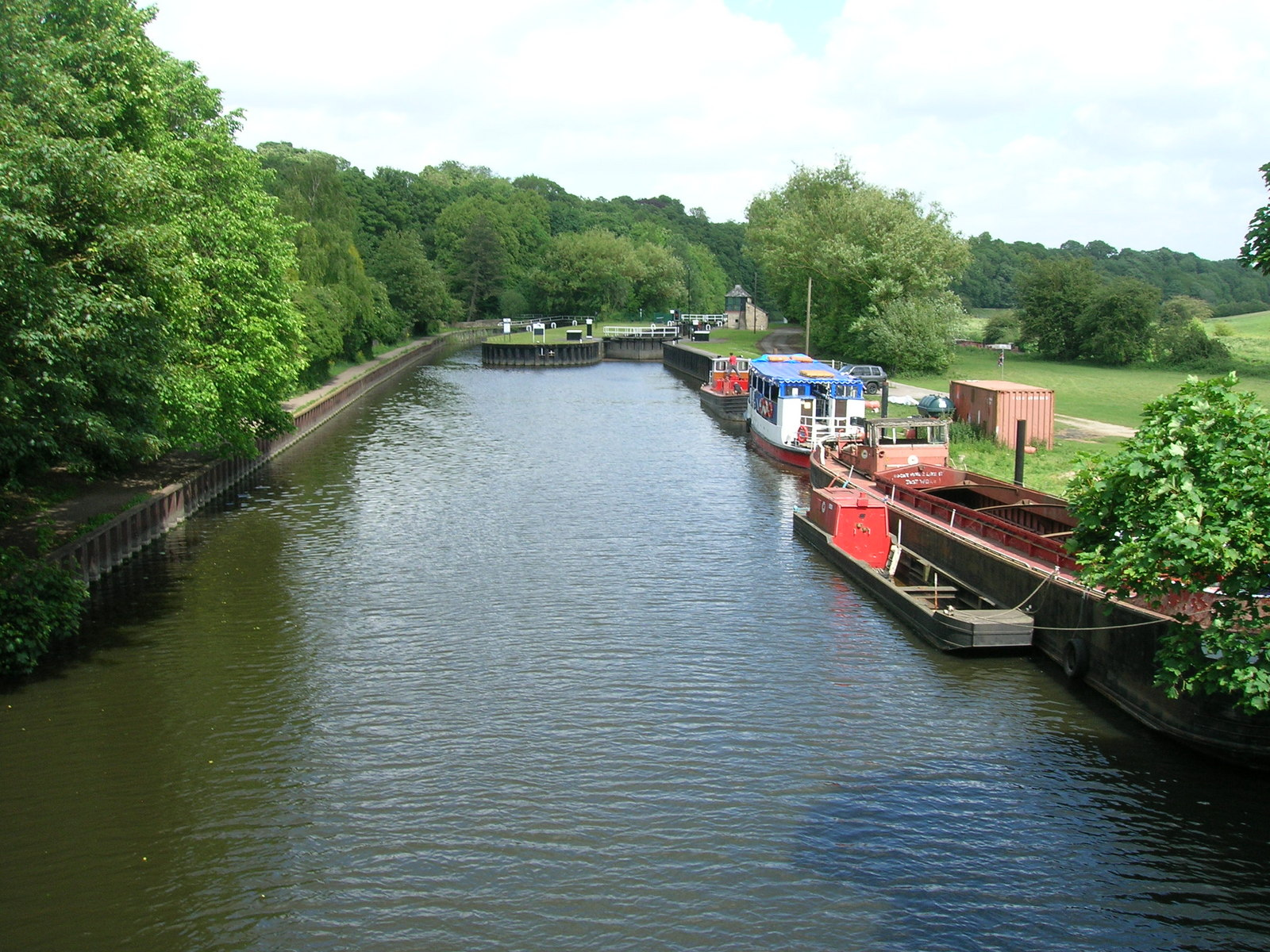
- Canal approaching the lock at Sprotbrough

- Location within City of Doncaster Location within South Yorkshire
- Area: 2.10 km^{2} (0.81 sq mi)
- Population: 7,548 (2021)
  - Density: 3,594/km^{2} (9,310/sq mi)
- OS grid reference: SE544050
  - London: 145 mi (233 km) SSE
- Civil parish: Sprotbrough and Cusworth
- Metropolitan borough: City of Doncaster
- Metropolitan county: South Yorkshire
- Region: Yorkshire and the Humber
- Country: England
- Sovereign state: United Kingdom
- Post town: Doncaster
- Postcode district: DN5
- Dialling code: 01302
- Police: South Yorkshire
- Fire: South Yorkshire
- Ambulance: Yorkshire
- UK Parliament: Doncaster North
- Website: Sprotbrough and Cusworth Parish Council

Sprotbrough is a village in the City of Doncaster in South Yorkshire, England, with a population of 7,548 at the 2021 census. The village is transected by the A1(M) motorway and is situated at the top of the Don Gorge, some 3 miles (4.8 km) west of Doncaster city centre. With Cusworth to the north, it forms the civil parish of Sprotbrough and Cusworth, which had a population of 12,134 in 2011.

The electoral ward of Sprotbrough, including numerous rural villages to the north and west, had a population of 11,143.

== History ==
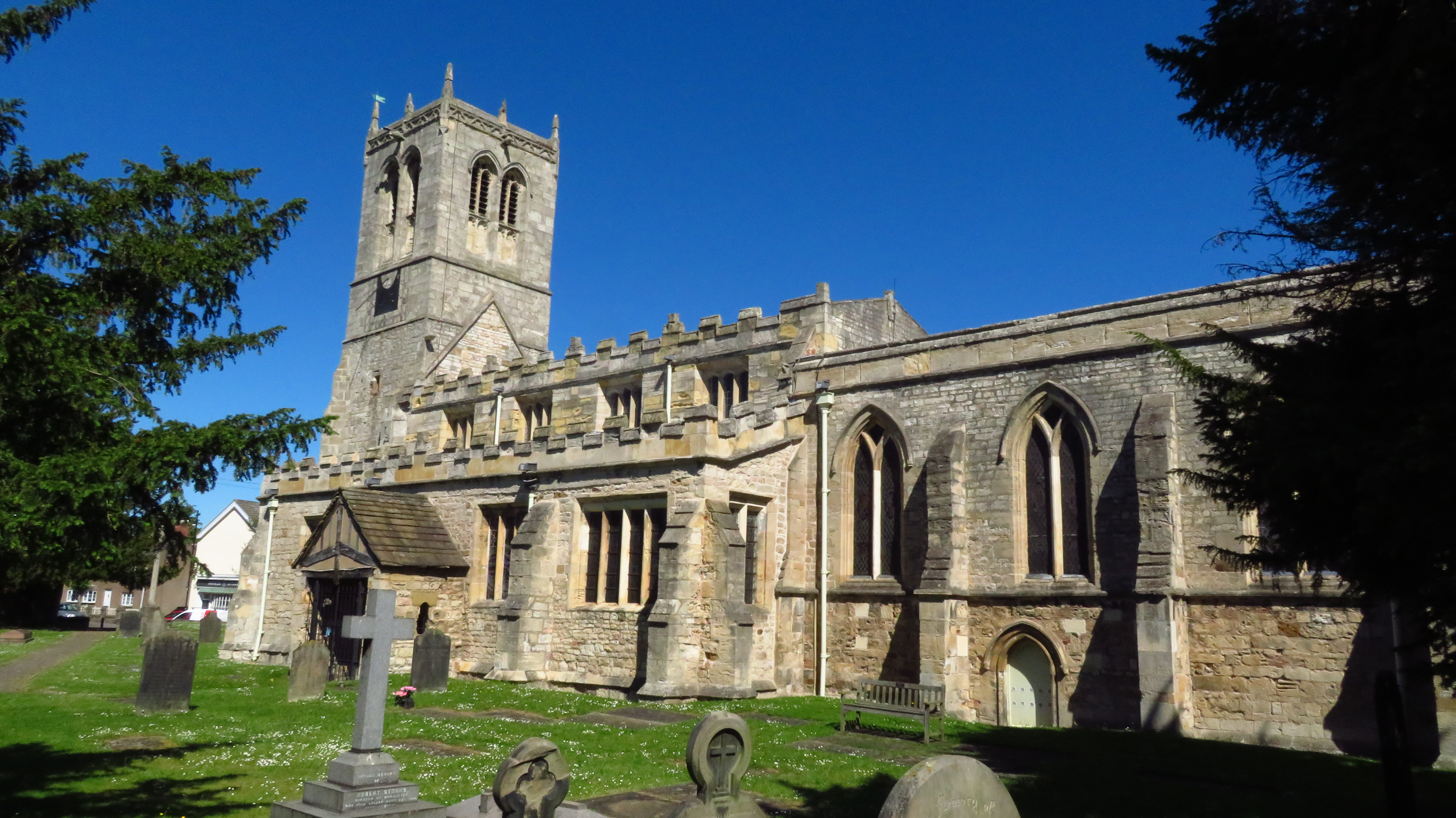
St Mary’s Church

The place name 'Sprotbrough' is first attested in the Domesday Book of 1086, where it appears as Sproteburg. The name is thought to mean 'Sprot's borough'.

Much of the local land was owned by the Fitzwilliam family until the 15th century, when the Copley family emerged as major landowners.

Sprotbrough Village harbours the Grade I listed St Mary's Church and The Old Rectory – the childhood home of Second World War flying ace Douglas Bader.

== Geography ==
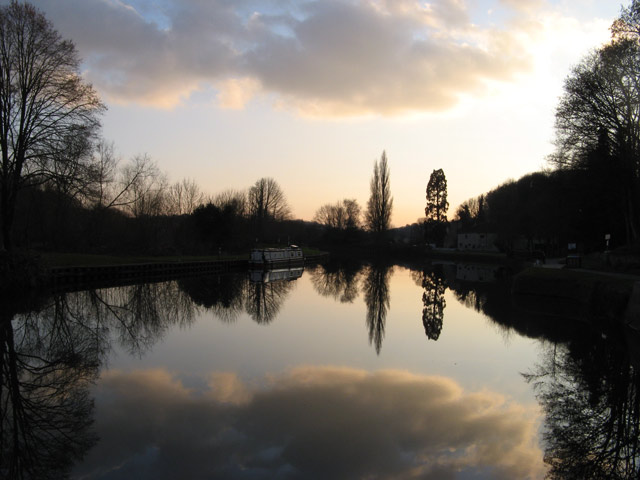
Sunset on the river

Sprotbrough is split into numerous distinct portions. West of the A1(M) Doncaster Bypass, Sprotbrough Village is the historic area surrounding St Mary's Church and the central shopping square. Sprotbrough Park, centred on Park Drive, consists of some expensive property and is arguably one of the most affluent neighbourhoods in the area. The hamlet of Lower Sprotbrough is located down the hill adjacent to the River Don within the Don Gorge. East of the motorway is the more suburban part of the village, constituting part of the wider Doncaster urban area.

Located along the A638 on its eastern edge is a large retail park (Danum Retail Park). In addition the Centurion Retail Park is located on the far side of the road in Bentley.

The small hamlet of Newton is situated immediately south of Sprotbrough on the river. It gives its name to a public house on Sprotbrough Road.

Sprotbrough Road connects the village to the A19 and A638 roads to the east for Central Doncaster. Melton Road goes to High Melton to the west. Spring Lane goes to Cusworth to the north, while Boat Lane provides access to Warmsworth and the Don Gorge to the south. There is also a lane to the rural village of Cadeby.

Its central shopping square consists of a convenience store, a pharmacy, a restaurant and wine bar, and an Indian restaurant. Additionally there is a Sainsbury's Local store on Sprotbrough Road. There are three schools, Orchard Infant School, Copley Junior School, and Richmond Hill Primary School. The local secondary school is Ridgewood School in Scawsby.

== Demography ==
Sprotbrough is an affluent area on the western edge of Doncaster. At the 2021 census, its population was 96.8% white, 1.4% Asian, 1.2% mixed race, 0.3% black, and 0.2% other ethnic groups. Christianity was the largest religion (58.8%), followed by no religion (39.6%).

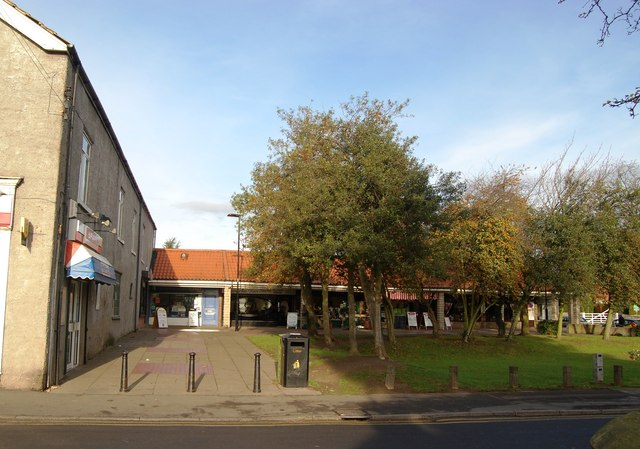
Shops in the village centre

== Governance ==
It is represented by two Conservative councillors on the City of Doncaster Council. The local member of parliament is Ed Miliband of the Labour Party.

Sprotbrough and Cusworth Parish Council serves the entire civil parish and consists of 17 elected councillors across 7 different wards. Most of Sprotbrough is within the Park Ward.

== Notable residents ==
- Sir Godfrey Copley, 2nd Baronet of Spotbrough House
- Sir Douglas Bader, Second World War flying ace
- Caroline Flint, former MP for Don Valley
- Graham Kirkham, Baron Kirkham, English businessman, the founder and chairman of sofa retailer DFS.
- Jeremy Clarkson, television presenter.
- Rebecca Hudson, professional golfer on the Ladies European Tour

== See also ==
- Listed buildings in Sprotbrough and Cusworth
- St George's Minster, Doncaster
