= Cusworth Hall =

18th-century country house near Doncaster, England

Coordinates: 53.5290°N 1.1771°W

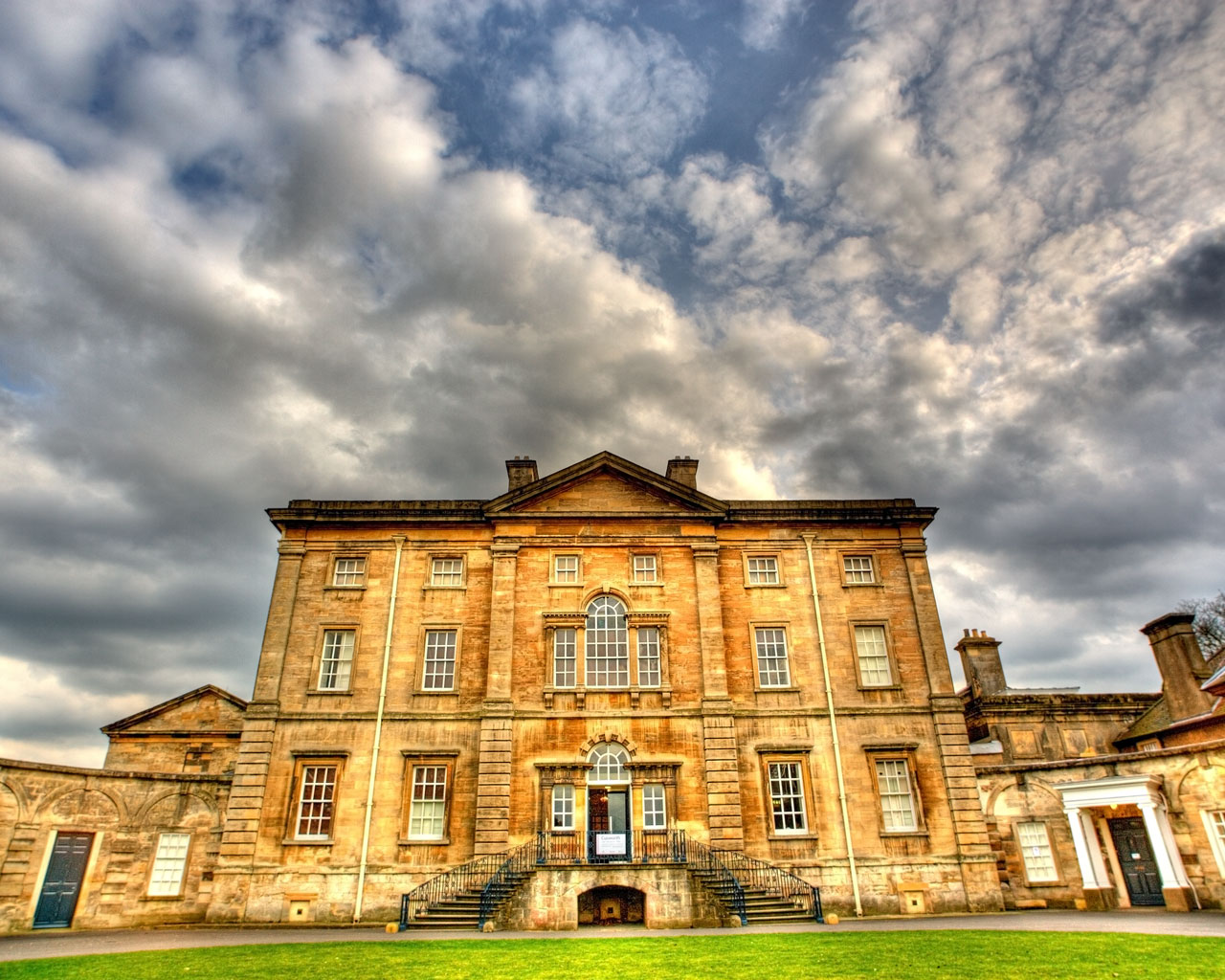
Northern exterior of Cusworth Hall

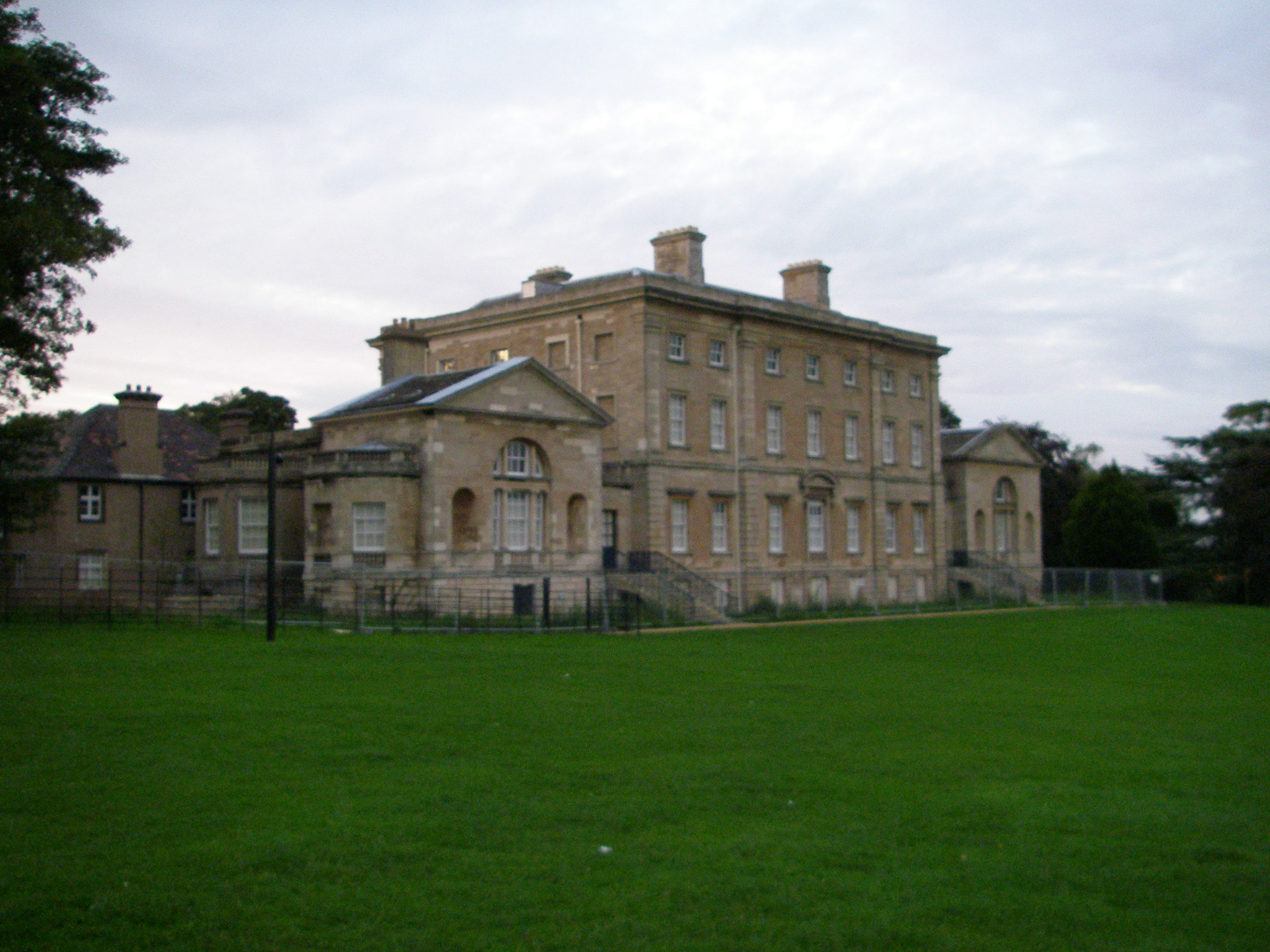
A photograph of Cusworth Hall

Cusworth Hall is an 18th-century Grade I listed country house in Cusworth, near Doncaster, South Yorkshire in the north of England. Set in the landscaped parklands of Cusworth Park, Cusworth Hall is a good example of a Georgian country house. It is now a country house museum.

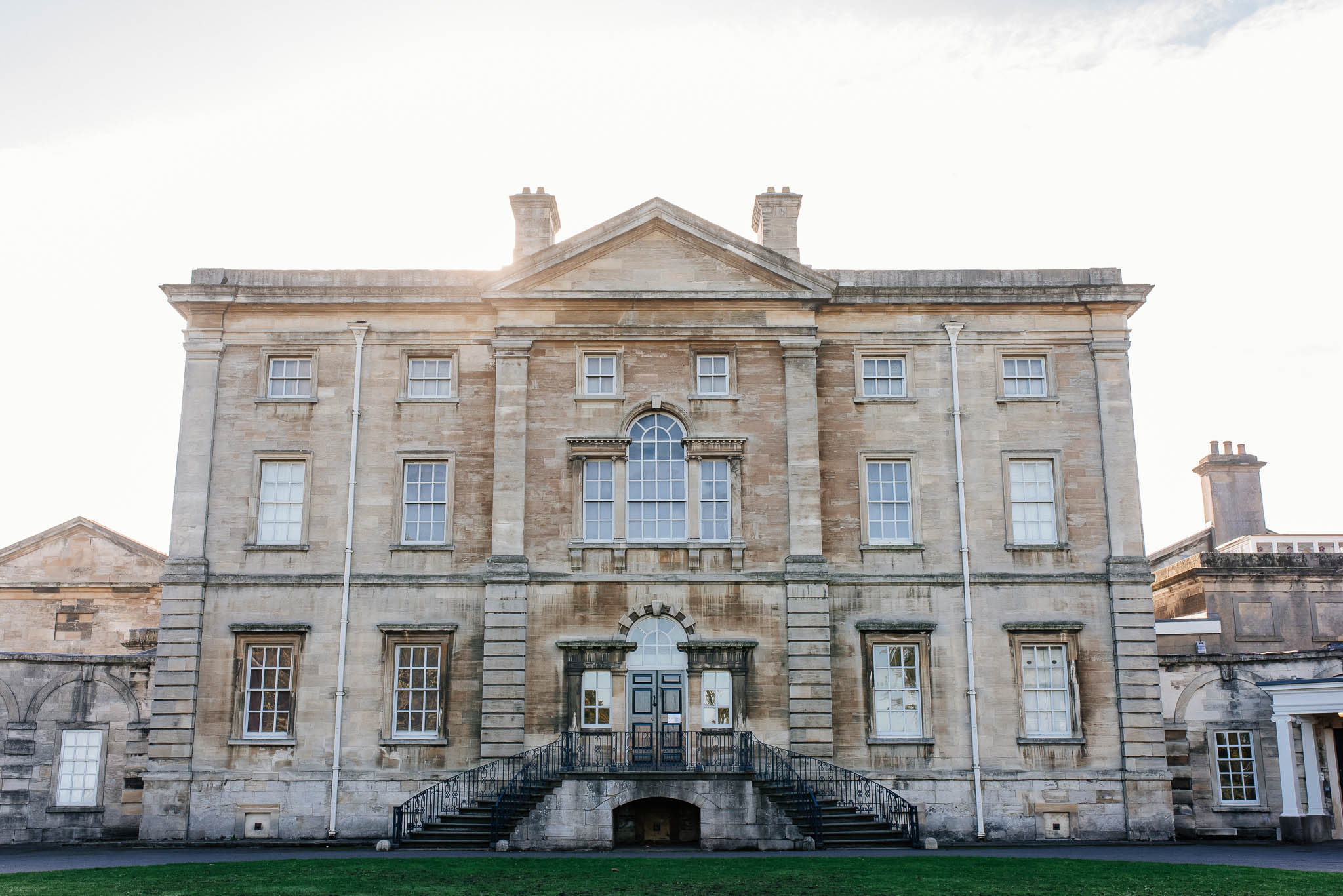
Cusworth Hall in Doncaster. Front of the building.

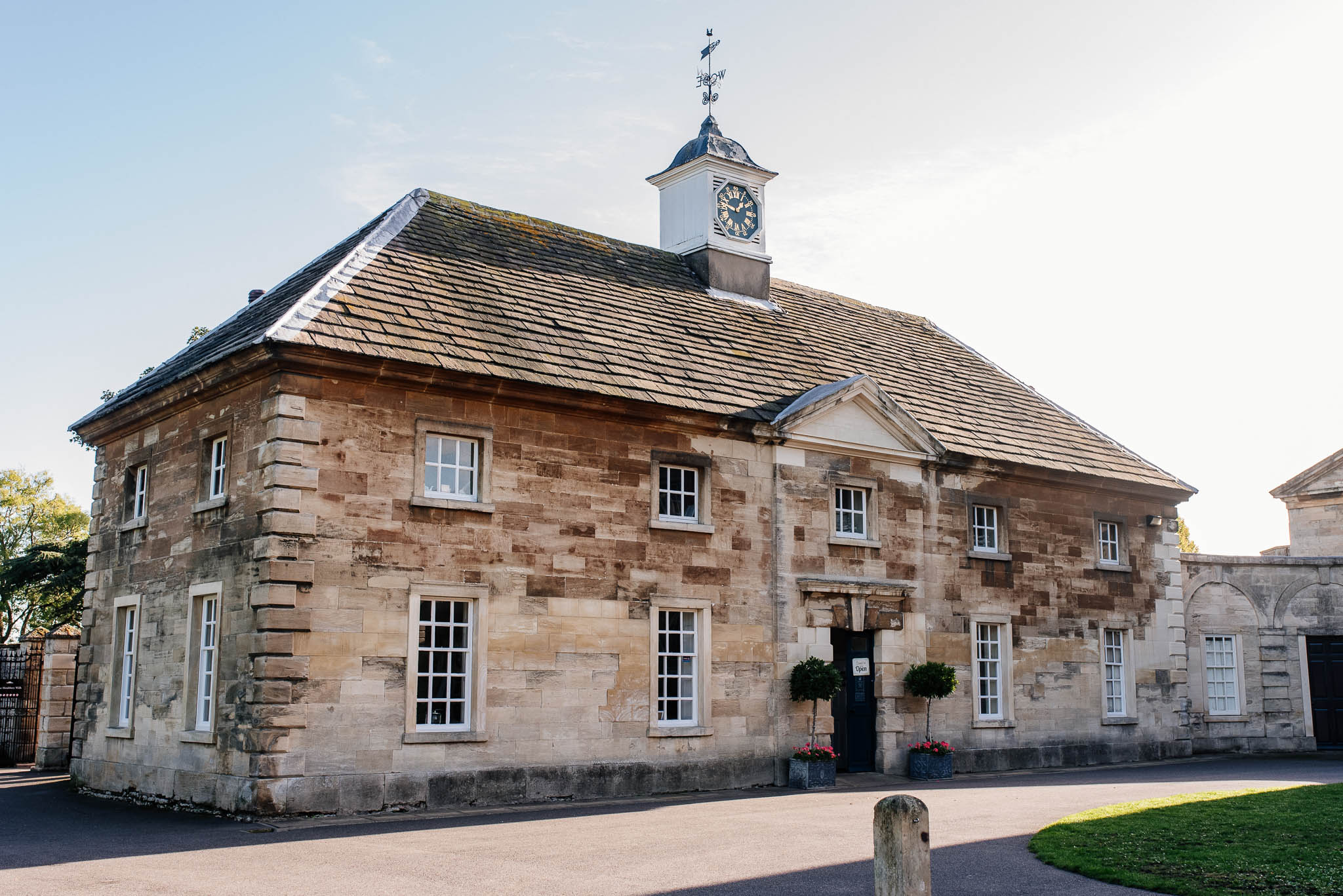
Cusworth Hall, Stable Block

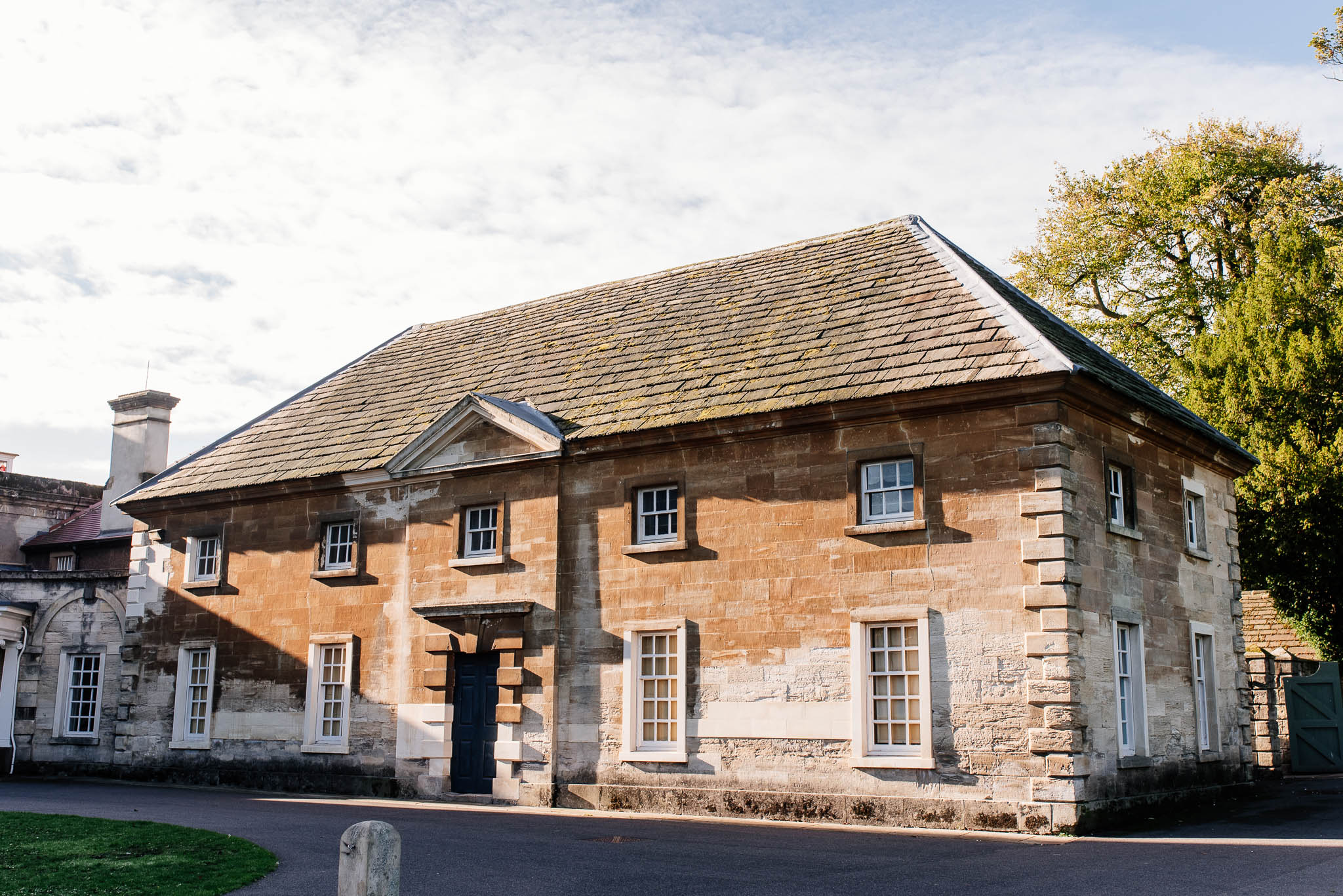
Outbuildings at Cusworth Hall

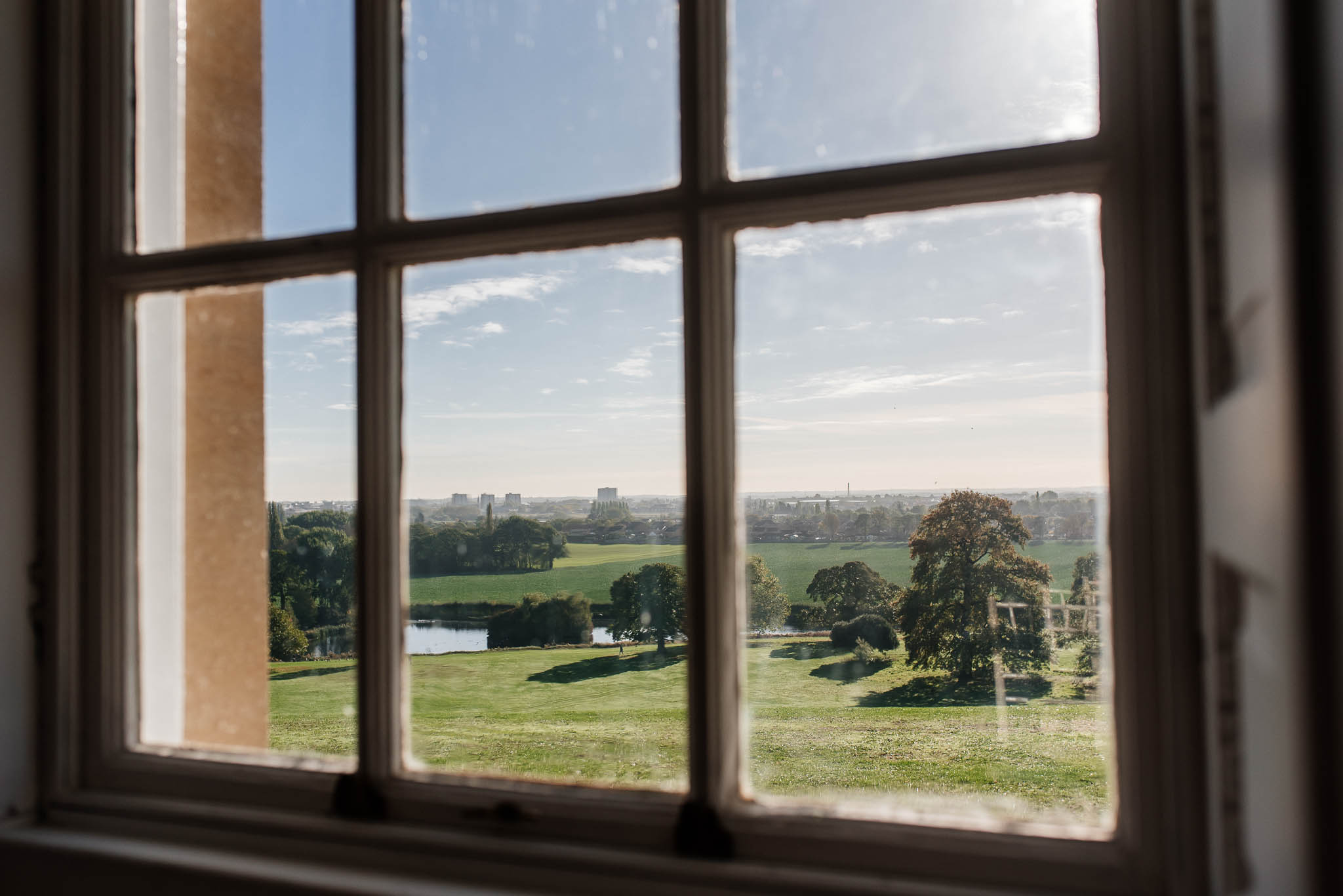
View over Doncaster town centre from a window at Cusworth hall

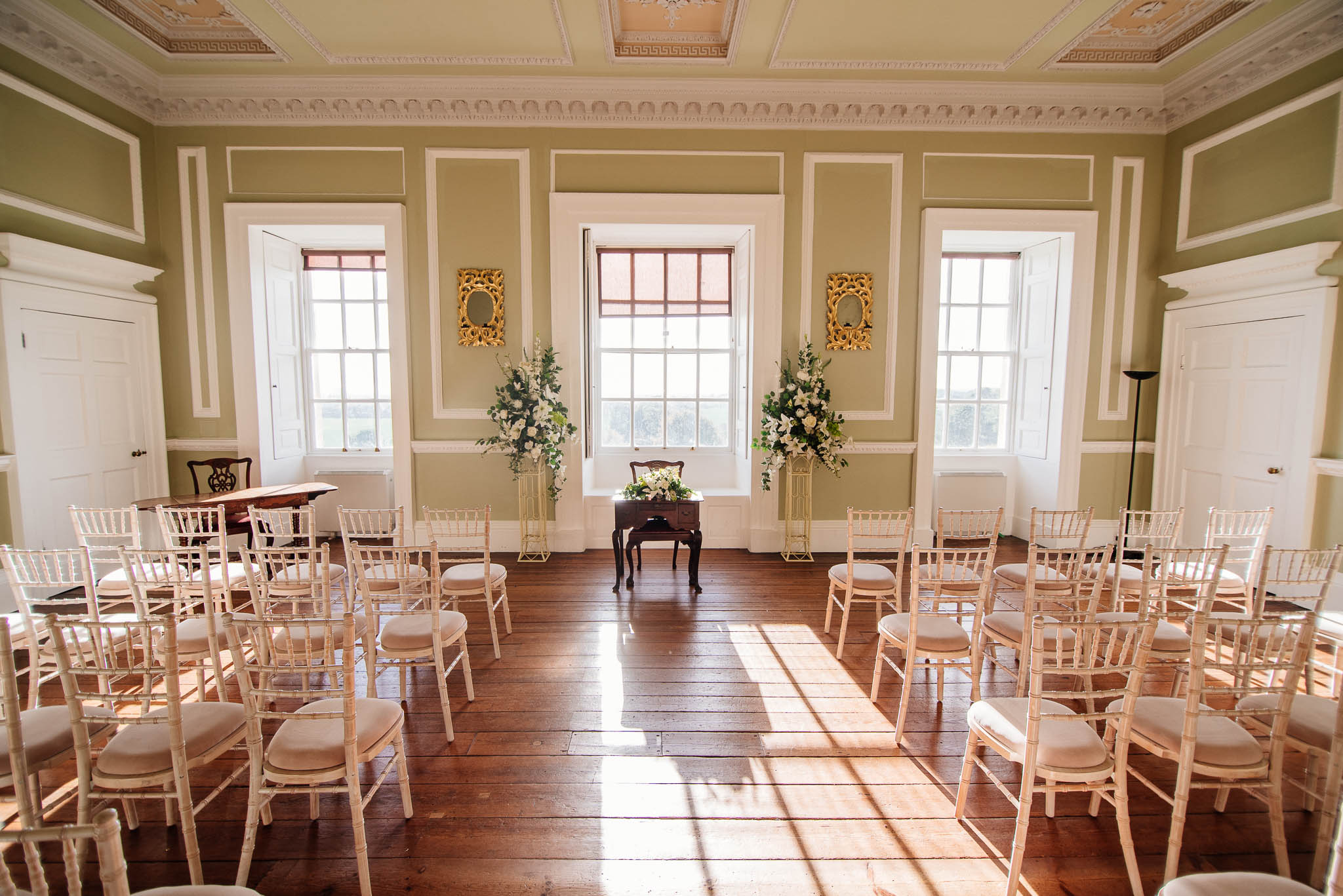
Cusworth Hall decorated for a wedding

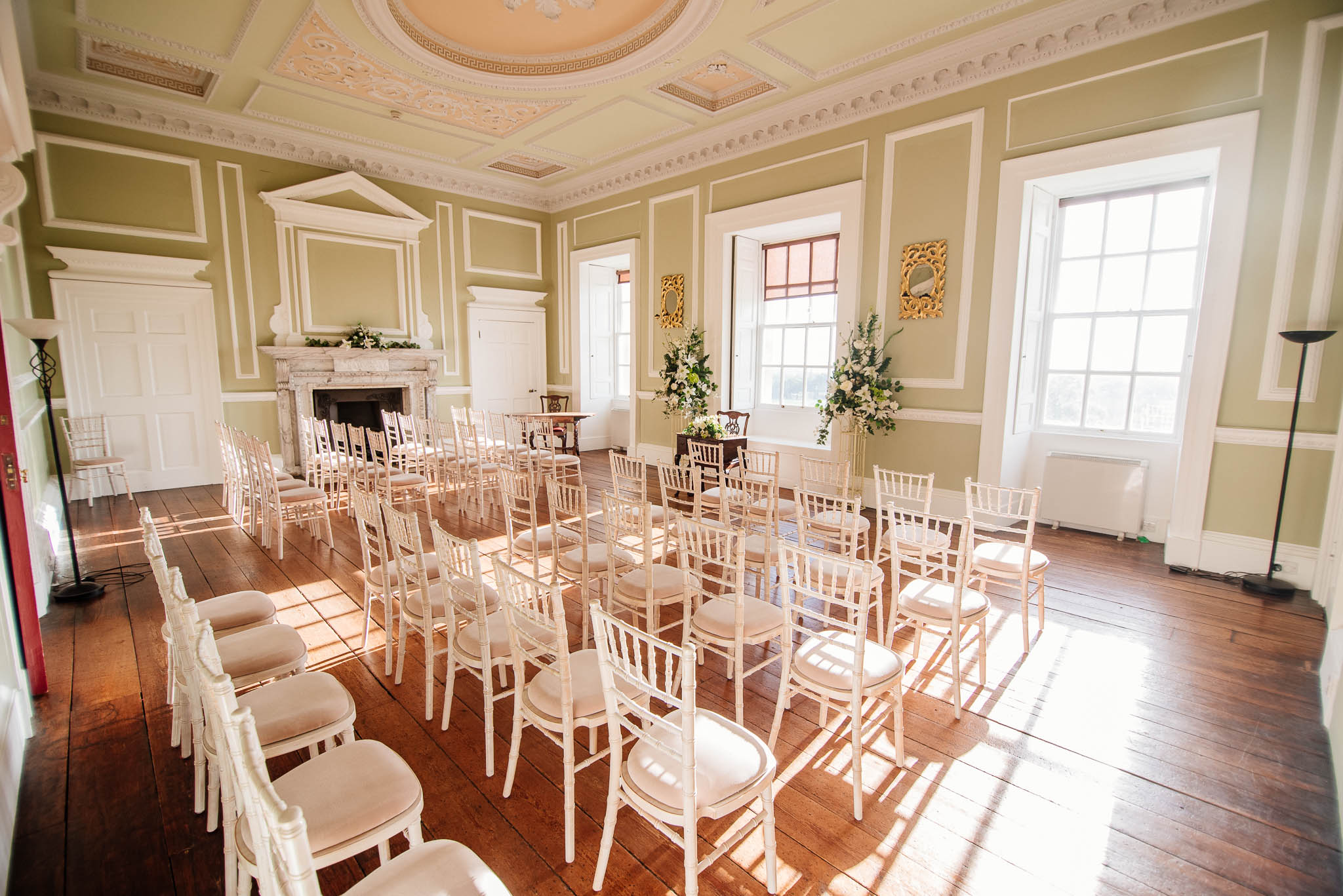
Cusworth Hall ceremony room set up for a wedding

The house is constructed of ashlar with slate roofs. The rectangular 6 x 5 bay plan main block is linked to 5 x 2 bay service wings.

== History ==
The Wrightson family had held the lordship of Cusworth since 1669.

The present house was built in 1740–1745 by George Platt for William Wrightson to replace a previous house and was further altered in 1749–1753 by James Paine. On William's death in 1760 the property passed to his daughter Isabella, who had married John Battie, who took the additional name of Wrightson in 1766. He employed the landscape designer Richard Woods to remodel the park. Woods was one of a group of respected landscape designers working across the country during the 18th century and Cusworth was one of his most important commissions in South Yorkshire, another being at Cannon Hall. Woods created a park of 250 acres with a hanging and a serpentine river consisting of three lakes embellished with decorative features such as the Rock Arch and the Cascade.

The estate afterwards passed to John and Isabella's son, William Wrightson (1752–1827), who was the MP for Aylesbury from 1784 to 1790 and High Sheriff of Yorkshire for 1819–1820. He was succeeded by his son William Battie-Wrightson (1789–1879), who at various times was MP for East Retford, Kingston upon Hull and Northallerton. He died childless and Cusworth Hall passed to his brother Richard Heber Wrightson, who died in 1891.

The property was then inherited by his nephew William Henry Thomas, who took the surname Battie-Wrightson by royal licence and died in 1903. He had married Lady Isabella Cecil, eldest daughter of the 3rd Marquess of Exeter. Between 1903 and 1909 Lady Isabella made further alterations to the house. She died in 1917, leaving an only son Robert Cecil Battie-Wrightson (1888–1952). On his death in 1952, the estate descended to his sister, a nurse who had married a Major Oswald Parker but later was variously known as Miss Maureen Pearse-Brown and as Mrs Pearce. She was obliged to sell the contents of Cusworth Hall in October 1952 to meet the death duties levied at Robert Cecil's death. She subsequently sold the hall to Doncaster Council.

In 1961 Doncaster Rural District Council purchased Cusworth Hall and the adjoining parkland from the Battie-Wrightson family. The Council undertook an initial restoration of the grounds and also recreated what is now the tearooms within the former stable block. The former reception rooms and spacious galleries now house the Museum of South Yorkshire life, officially opened on 30 September 1967.

Cusworth Hall and Park underwent an extensive £7.5 million renovation between 2002 and 2005, involving essential conservation repairs to the Hall and restoration of the landscape gardens. Within the hall external repairs to the stonework and roof were undertaken to ensure that the exterior was watertight, whilst internal works upgraded internal services and enabled new displays to be installed.

The restoration of the designed landscape have been greatly influenced by a comprehensive analysis of available archive material, among which are the original written memoranda and sketches produced by Richard Woods for his site forman Thomas Coalie. An integrated archaeological programme also formed a key aspect of the restorations, recording in detail landscape features such as the Rock Arch, Cascade, and Bridge. This restoration has not 'recreated' the 18th century scheme, although elements are still incorporated within a 'living' amenity garden that is now thriving as a result of the recent work undertaken in partnership with the Friends of Cusworth Park.

The Hall reopened to the public on 23 May 2007 and the new displays document the history of South Yorkshire and it is a valued resource for local residents, students and school groups alike.

== Features ==
Cusworth Estate

Cusworth was first mentioned as ‘Cuzeuuorde’ in the domesday survey of 1086 but there has been a settlement here for centuries dating back to the Anglo-Saxon period. Many different families had held the lands and manor but they did not always live at Cusworth.

The "Old Hall"

A large house is first mentioned in 1327. Robert Wrightson bought the lands and manor of Cusworth in 1669 from Sir Christopher Wray. The first surviving map of Cusworth is that of Joseph Dickinson's 1719 plan which shows the hall and gardens covered only 1 acre with the orchards a further 2 acres. What is most significant at this time was the ‘Parke’ of some 25 acres. The "Old Hall" was next to the walled gardens in the centre of Cusworth village. In 1726 the "Old Hall" was expanded: this including altering the gardens between 1726 and 1735. This expanded the kitchen garden into the size and form we know today with the Bowling Green and Pavilion.

In the period 1740–1745 William Wrightson employed George Platt, a mason architect from Rotherham, to build a new hall – the current Cusworth Hall – high on a scarp slope on the Magnesian Limestone removing the Hall, and the family, from the village of Cusworth. The "Old Hall" was largely demolished in the process, many components from the old building re-used in the new.

Cusworth Hall

Cusworth Hall itself and its outbuildings are at the centre of the park enjoying ‘prospect’ over the town of Doncaster. The Grade I-listed eighteenth century hall was designed by George Platt in the Palladian style. Cusworth Hall is handsome, well proportioned, with wings consisting of a stable block and great kitchen. Later additions by James Paine include a chapel and library. It has decorative outbuildings including a Brew House, Stable Block and Lodge. In addition it has a decorative garden called Lady Isabella's Garden on the west side adjacent to the chapel. On its eastern flank the stable block and gardeners' bothy. Attached to the bothy is a decorative iron enclosure known as the Peacock Pen.

Cusworth Park

Cusworth Park is an historic designed landscape with a Grade II listing in the English Heritage Register of Parks and Gardens. It was designed and created by the nationally known landscape architect Richard Woods to ‘improve’ the park in the style made famous by Lancelot ‘Capability’ Brown now termed ‘The English Landscape Park’. Work started in 1761 laying out the grounds and the serpentine river.

The land forming the existing park is 60 acres (25 hectares) – 250,000m, and was part of the much larger parkland (250 acres) and estates (20,000 acres) of the Battie-Wrightson family who owned Cusworth Hall.

The walled garden

The earliest description of the layout of the park and walled gardens is that shown on Joseph Dickinson's 1719 plan. In 1761 Richard Woods altered areas within the walled gardens. Together, Woods' Kitchen Garden and Green House Garden occupy the site of the orchard shown on Dickinson's plan.

The purchase of bricks from Epworth for the construction of the walled gardens is recorded in the New House Accounts.

The garden was a compartmentalised space, however with focus on domestic production in some sections, exotics in another, an orchard, and formal flower gardens in the rest.

The kitchen gardens included pine pits (pineapple house), later to become stove houses and mushroom houses.

The Entrance Terrace

(Upper Terrace) Old plans show a narrow walled enclosure or 'entrance terrace' running east–west. The walls of this enclosure may well have been of stone or stoned faced and still, in part survives. To the south are the main components of the walled garden. Access from the terrace down to the bowling green is via a flight of stone steps.

The Bowling Green

Described on Richard Woods plans of 1760. This is a roughly square, walled enclosure where the bowling green is surrounded by an earthed banked terraced walk. The enclosure is defined by a brick wall, which was lowered along its western side to give a view over to the Green House Garden.

Summerhouse / Bowling Pavilion

The summerhouse, built in 1726, is the main architectural feature of the walled garden. It is of two stories with the upper storey accessed from the Bowling Green. There is an impression of more carefully shaped quoins at the corners but it is probable that the walls were originally rendered and lime washed externally. There are windows giving views across the Bowling Green from the upper chamber and across the Flower Garden from the lower chamber.

During restoration in the 1990s the upper chamber was decorated with Trompe-l'œil. showing views of imagined walled gardens at Cusworth.

Flower Garden

The flower garden was designed to be viewed principally from the higher position of the bowling green. It was subdivided by cross-paths and furnished with four formal beds. Although one of the smallest compartments, the flower garden was the most highly ornamental and tightly designed. It would have created a formal, colourful architectural space contrasting with the simplicity of the bowling green.

Hall Garden

The function of the Hall Garden is not clear, but it appears to have been an extension of the decorative scheme of the flower garden. The Hall Garden has a perimeter walk and is then divided into two plots by a further, central path.

Peach House

This whitewash wall indicates the position of the peach house.

Melon Pits

Melon pits ran east–west along this area.

Orchard

Through the 18th century the orchard was not enclosed and remained open until the late 19th century. It was double its current size extending back up to Cusworth Lane until the northern half was sold off for housing in the 1960s.

Kitchen Garden (no longer existing)

The west, south and this east boundary wall(s) of the garden still exist but the plot of land was sold off for housing in the 1960s. There was an access gate between the Hall Garden and the kitchen garden (this can be seen bricked up in the northwest corner). This garden had a perimeter walk and was planted with trees arranged in parallel lines orchestrated around a small building at the northern end of the compartment.

Green House Garden (no longer existing)

The kitchen garden represents the greater part of the area occupied by the original orchard shown on Dickinson's 1719 plan. The remaining area was described on Woods’ plan as the Green House Garden and was shown divided into two unequal parts. Both parts of the garden appear to have been planted with trees, probably fruit trees. A building abuts the bowling green in roughly the position as the one shown on the Dickinson plan but there is an additional building, roughly square in plan, to the northwest corner of the enclosure. This was probably the Dovecote for which Wrightson paid £9 15s 0d in 1736.

The west boundary wall still exists and this low (east) wall that runs along the length of the bowling green but the plot of land was sold off for housing in the 1960s.

== Current usage ==
Cusworth Hall Museum and Park is the venue for a varied program of seasonal exhibitions, events and activities linked to the history of the area. including Country Fairs, vintage vehicle rallies, historic re-enactments, wildlife sessions and a range of seasonally themed events. A free, weekly, 5 km parkrun takes place every Saturday at 9 am in the grounds of Cusworth Hall. The first event was held on Saturday 5 October 2019 and was hosted by the staff at Cusworth in collaboration with the local community.

Additionally, Doncaster Museums' Education Service offers a range of learning sessions to schools and educational establishments. Specialist and experienced Education Officers deliver learning workshops to schools across a broad range of topics as well as out-of-school-hours activities for families and local communities.

== See also ==
- Grade I listed buildings in South Yorkshire
- Listed buildings in Sprotbrough and Cusworth
