= Scawsby =

Village in South Yorkshire, England

Coordinates: 53.53745°N 1.16917°W

- Suburb
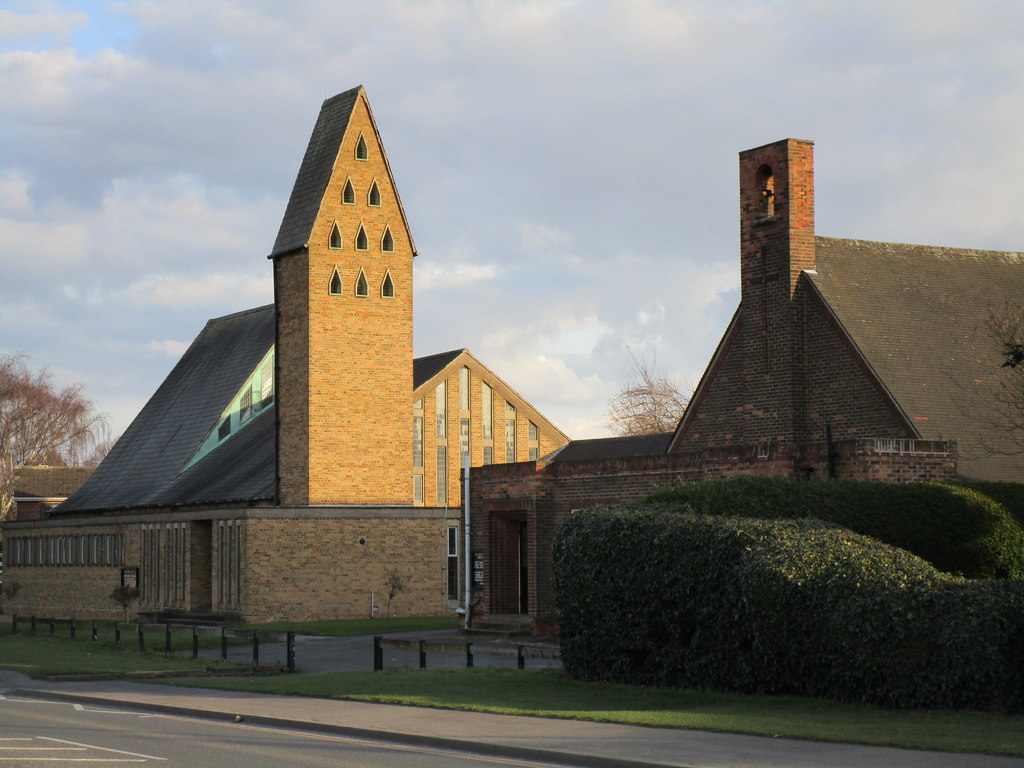
- Church of St Leonard and St Jude

- Location within City of Doncaster Location within South Yorkshire
- Population: 2,936 (Brodsworth parish; 2011 census)
- OS grid reference: SE5404
  - London: 145 mi (233 km) SSE
- Civil parish: Brodsworth
- Metropolitan borough: City of Doncaster
- Metropolitan county: South Yorkshire
- Region: Yorkshire and the Humber
- Country: England
- Sovereign state: United Kingdom
- Post town: Doncaster
- Postcode district: DN5
- Dialling code: 01302
- Police: South Yorkshire
- Fire: South Yorkshire
- Ambulance: Yorkshire
- UK Parliament: Doncaster North

Scawsby is a suburb of Doncaster, South Yorkshire, England. It is situated approximately 2 miles north-west of the city centre on the A635 road to Barnsley close to its terminus with the A638.

== Geography ==
Sunnyfields, Scawthorpe, Bentley, Cusworth, Marr and Little Canada (clockwise from the north) are neighbouring settlements.

The local parish church in Scawsby is the Church of St Leonard and St Jude on Barnsley Road.

Scawsby is not a civil parish in its own right, mostly forming part of Brodsworth parish, which had a population of 2,936 at the 2011 census. Therefore, it has no official boundaries, but is generally considered to be separated from Sunnyfields by the Roman Ridge to the north, and is interwoven with Cusworth to the south.

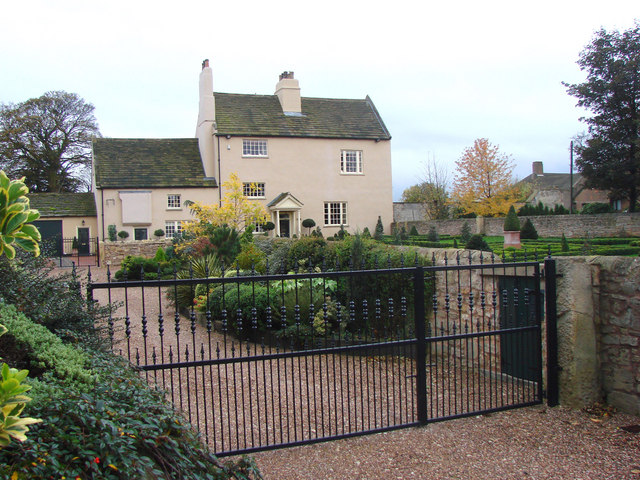
Scawsby Hall

Listed buildings in the village include 17th century Scawsby Hall and a Tudor cottage.

The A635 Barnsley Road is the main thoroughfare through Scawsby. On Barnsley Road is the local primary school, Scawsby Saltersgate Junior School, with Scawsby Saltersgate Infant School, Scawsby Community Centre, Scawsby Health Centre, and two public houses, Scawsby Mill and The Sun. Rosedale School, Ridgewood School and Stone Hill School are all other schools in Scawsby. It is a short distance down from junction 37 of the A1(M) Doncaster Bypass.

Scawsby is in the BBC Yorkshire and ITV Yorkshire television regions. The local radio stations are TX1 Radio, which covers all of Doncaster and Bassetlaw, Sine FM, a community radio station for Doncaster, Hallam FM, a commercial station for South Yorkshire, and BBC Radio Sheffield, the local BBC station. Heart, Capital and Greatest Hits Radio networked stations also cover the area.

== History ==
In 2012, BBC News reported on Scawsby Fisheries, a fish and chip shop on Rowena Drive which attempted for charity the world fish and chip portion record, with a fry of 33lb (15kg) of battered cod alongside 64lb (29kg) of chips.

Scawsby Day College of Education operated here in the village, until it closed in 1976.

In the Domesday Book it was part of the West Riding of Yorkshire. Its head of manor is Brodsworth, a village about 3.5 miles north-west of Scawsby.

In 1536, during the uprising known as the Pilgrimage of Grace the royalist leaders, Thomas Howard, 3rd Duke of Norfolk, and George Talbot, 4th Earl of Shrewsbury, opened negotiations with the insurgents at Scawsby Leys, NW of Scawsby, where Robert Aske had assembled between 30,000 and 40,000 people.
