= Ea Beck =

River in South Yorkshire, England

Ea Beck: Frickley Beck; Hampole Dike; Old Ea Beck; Thorpe Marsh Drain
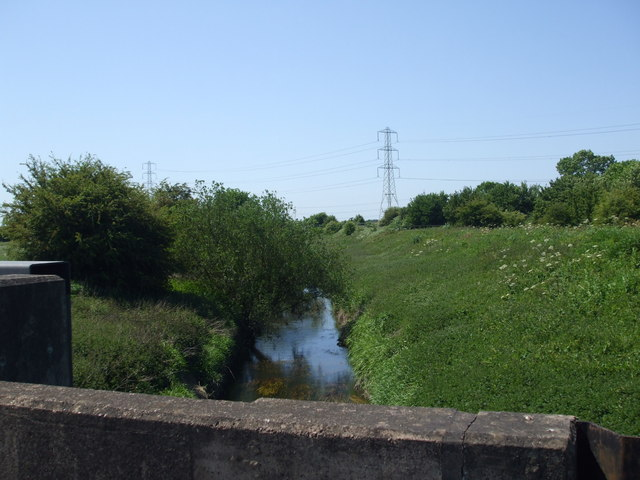
- Thorpe Marsh Drain (Ea Beck) near its confluence with the Don

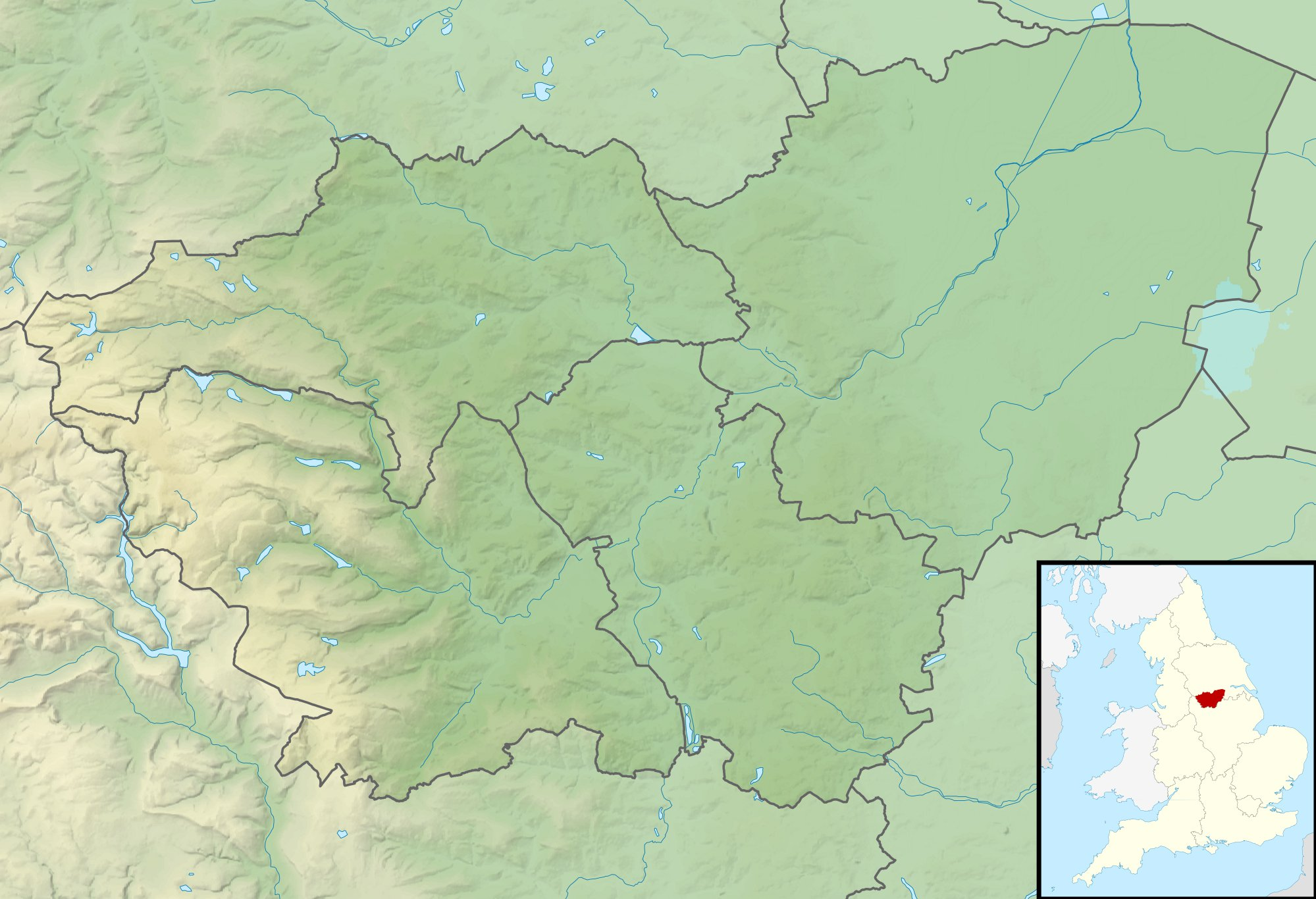
- Location of the mouth into the River Don

Location
- County: South Yorkshire
- Country: England

Physical characteristics
- Mouth
  - location: Thorpe in Balne
  - coordinates: 53.591°N 1.091°W
- Length: 20 miles (32 km)

Basin features
- River system: River Don

The Ea Beck, also spelled Eaubeck or Eau Beck, is a small river in South Yorkshire, England, that flows eastwards into the River Don at Thorpe-in-Balne. The Environment Agency lists the beck as starting at South Elmsall, but mapping lists the beck with several names along its course. The beck has twice flooded areas and villages that it passes through in the 21st century.

== Toponymy ==
The derivation of the name Ea for the beck has at least two possibilities: Oliver Rackham suggested that the name Ea indicates a drained or altered river-course, which was a common Anglo-Saxon term for drained fenland rivers in East Anglia, Hampshire and the peatlands of Yorkshire around the River Don. Eilert Ekwall suggests the word ēa has the same root (Old Norse) and means just river, being used as a root for the rivers Eye, Ray, Rea and Yeo.

== Catchment area overview ==
Different authorities give different names to the watercourse. The Environment Agency record the Ea Beck as being 20 miles (32 km) long, and draining a catchment area of 36 square miles (92 km^{2}). However, on Ordnance Survey mapping, various sections are named Hague Hall Beck, The Beck, Hampole Dike, Old Ea Beck, Smallholme and Tilts Drain, and Thorpe Marsh Drain, with no mention of Ea Beck. Doncaster Council suggest that the Ea Beck is the watercourse formed by the confluence of The Skell and Hampole Dike, downstream of Humber Head Bridge.

The beck runs through a former coal mining area, though the river valley is known for its magnesian limestone deposits around the Doncaster area. The course of the beck has been heavily altered, especially in its lower reaches, due to the coal seams found in that area which needed to be free from water ingress. Mining subsidence has led to the beck being modified with raised banks and pumps to effectively drain the water away. Colliery pumping programmes and raised banks along the river's course were implemented under the Doncaster Drainage Act of 1929.

== Course ==
The Ea Beck system rises as a series of small streams. Furthest to the west is Hague Hall Beck, which rises just above the 70-metre (230 ft) contour near the A628 road to the south of Hemsworth. It flows to the east and then the north-east to reach the Wakefield Line railway track. Just before it passes under its embankment, it is joined by another small stream which flows south-eastwards from near Little Hemsworth school. It then runs along the northern edge of the railway track, making a small diversion to pass under the embankment of the Dearne Valley line. A third source, Langthwaite Beck, rises near South Kirkby common and flows eastwards along the southern edge of the town before turning to the north-east along the western edge of South Elmsall. It passes under the railway to join Hague Hall Beck, which then crosses beneath the Wakefield line again close to South Elmsall railway station. Immediately afterwards, it is labelled The Beck by the Ordnance Survey.

Continuing eastwards, it passes South Elmsall sewage treatment works, and passes through a culvert under the former Hull, Barnsley and West Riding Junction Railway and another under the Wakefield line. It is crossed by the A638 road, and then by the railway twice on the northern edge of the village of Hampole. It is then labelled Hampole Dyke, and there is a straight section beside the railway, with the remains of a former loop on the south side of the tracks. Humber Head Bridge carries the A1 road over the railway and the river, after which the river channel is embanked on both sides. The next tributary is The Skell, which rises between Upton and North Elmsall, and passes through Wrangbrook, Skelbrooke and Skellow, as it heads south-eastwards. It is crossed by the B1220 road at Skellow Bridge on the southern edge of Skellow, and is embanked from there to its confluence with Ea Beck. Both Skellow and Skelbrooke derive their names from the river.

The course has been significantly altered below Humber Head Bridge. In 1914, it meandered across Humber Head Ings, and was known as the Holmeroyd or Humber Head Dike. The meanders have been removed, and the confluence with The Skell moved a little further downstream. The main flow of the river headed to the south east, crossing under the railway. A weir on the left bank fed a small channel called Ings Drain, which linked to New Drain. On the south side of the railway, the main channel flowed through a boggy area called Size Ings to a point below Adwick railway junction. The river flowed over a sluice to enter Mill Dike, which continued along the southern side of the railway to power a corn mill at Adwick le Street. A smaller channel crossed under the south branch of the railway, where it was joined by New Drain, which had crossed under the north branch. The combined flow was then known as Old Ea Beck.

The modern channel follows much of the course of Ings Drain, but then runs closer to the railway embankment, picking up the course of New Drain where it passed under the railway. The original channel along the south side of the railway still runs down to the mill, but that to the north of the railway has gone. Adwick Mill Dyke pumping station, part of the modern drainage system, uses the crossing under the south railway embankment to return water from the head of Mill Dike to the Old Ea Beck. Mill Dike continues to Adwick railway station, where a drainage channel heads to the north east across Adwick Common. Now known as Bowling Alley Drain, it feeds Goosepool pumping station, which returns water to the Old Ea Beck.

Below the outfall from Adwick Mill Dyke pumping station, the river is crossed by a railway chord linking the two lines to the east of Adwick Junction. The B1220 road crosses at White Cross Bridge, after which Goosepool pumping station is situated on the right bank. The next bridge is Bentley Moor Bridge, which carries Bentley Moor Lane over the river. There is a sharp bend with a bridge which formerly carried a railway from Bullcroft Main Colliery, with Duck Holt pumping station immediately downstream. The Old Ea Beck becomes the Smallholme and Tilts Drain on Ordnance Survey maps, and the river is crossed by Tilts Hill Bridge, carrying the A19 road. Tilts Hill pumping station is on the right bank, with Thornhurst pumping station on the left. Tilts Bridge carries Hall Villa Lane, a minor road to Tilts, where there is a moated site consisting of two islands with a water-filled moat. A 17th century house stands on one of the islands, and the site is a scheduled monument. Another disused railway bridge and a bridge carrying the East Coast main line cross in quick succession, beyond which Thorpe Marsh Nature Reserve occupies the left bank. Sandall Nooking and Norwood pumping stations are on the right bank, before the river makes a sharp turn to the north-east and becomes Thorpe Marsh Drain. Flood Evacuation pumping station is on the right bank just after the bend.

The river passes the site of Thorpe Marsh Power Station, which lies to the east. Just before a railway bridge carrying the freight line to Hatfield and Stainforth, the low level catchwater drain running alongside the right bank becomes the Engine Drain, which has its own outfall into the Don, protected by penstocks and flaps to prevent flow up the drain from high levels in the Don. Marsh Lane Bridge carries a track and another bridge carries Thorpe Bank Road, which runs along the left bank of the River Don. The river enters the Don through a flood gate.

There are three monitoring station along the river, which measure its level. From west to east these are South Elmsall, Adwick-le-Street, and Norwood. Norwood produces an upstream and a downstream level. The highest level ever recorded at Norwood (downstream) was 24.4 feet (7.45 m) on 10 November 2019. This was 9.4 feet (2.86 m) higher than the normal maximum level of Ea Beck at this location. The mouth of the river is at Thorpe-in-Balne, where the exit into the River Don is tide-locked with gates. The beck, along with the River Went, are the two main tributaries of the River Don, before it flows into the Ouse at Goole.

== History ==
The beck is designated as a main river from Hague Hall Beck and Frickley Beck, to its outfall into the River Don at Thorpe in Balne. There are pointing doors at the junction, which are designed to shut when levels in the Don exceed those in the EA Beck, to prevent water flowing back up the river and causing flooding. On the upstream side of the sluice structure is a vertical penstock, which can be lowered if debris prevents the pointing doors from closing properly. The structure is maintained by the Environment Agency. A long watercourse was taken from Ea Beck in the 1780s to power a corn mill at Adwick-le-Street.

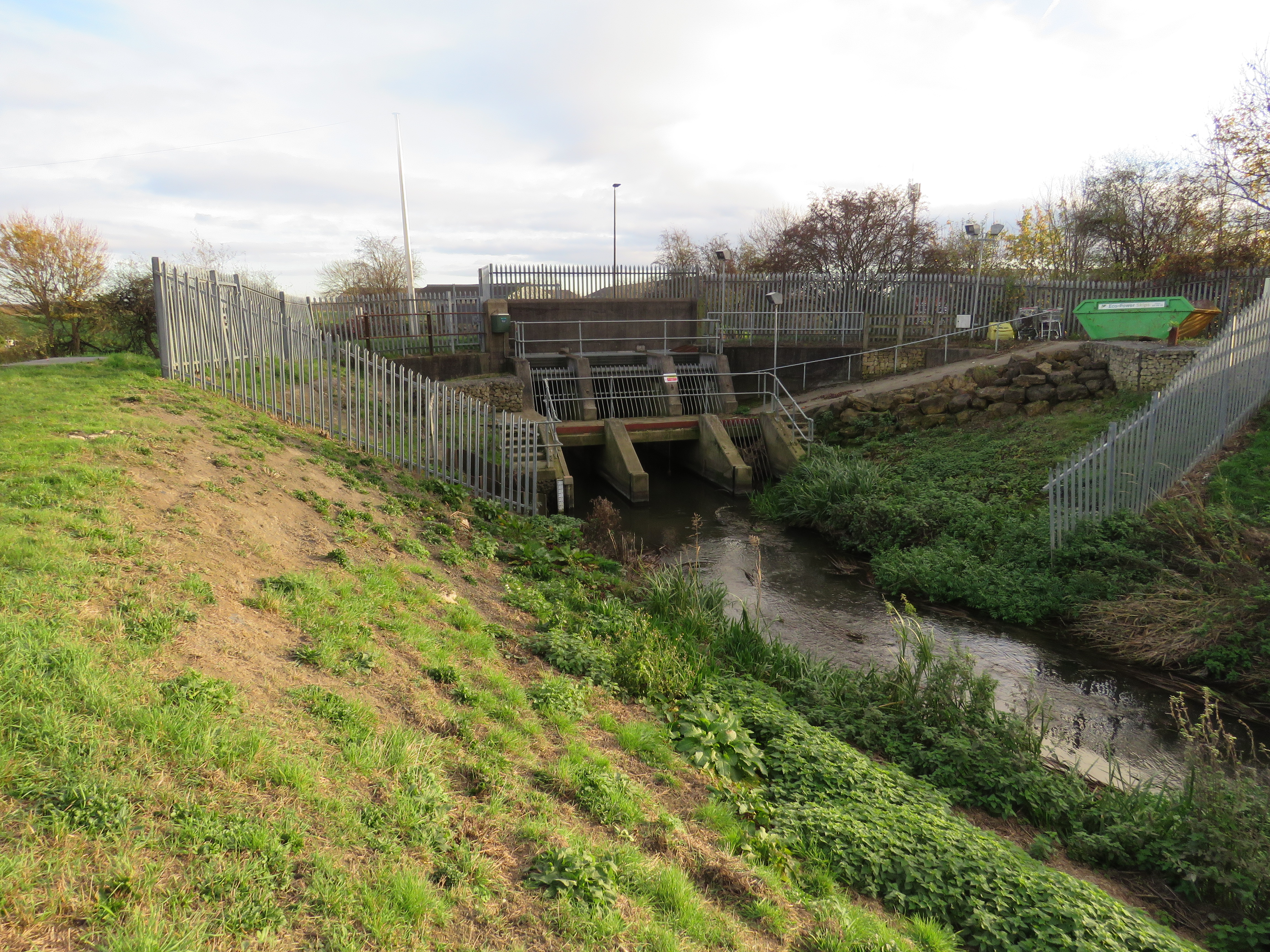
White Cross syphon carries the Ea Beck under the B1220 road

Subsidence caused by coal mines was sufficiently serious through the mining regions of Britain that a Royal Commission on Mining Subsidence was convened in 1926, and its first report identified the Doncaster area as a location where the problem was particularly severe. A second commission looked at the Doncaster area specifically, and reported in 1928. The Doncaster Area Drainage Act 1929 (19 & 20 Geo.5, c.xvii) was passed, creating the Doncaster Central Board, with responsibility to address the issues. As a result, 6 miles (9.7 km) of the banks of the Ea Beck from the A1 Humber Head Bridge to its mouth were raised and strengthened using waste from Bullcroft Colliery and some fill that was dug up locally. Conditions in the Bentley area were addressed by a scheme developed by Brundell and Farran between 1939 and 1940. Farran was the engineer for the Dun Drainage Commissioners at the time. A major part of that scheme involved raising the banks of the Ea Beck for about 2.5 miles (4 km). A new method of achieving the work was tried out, involving cable-operated scrapers, pulled by tractors. Additional material was obtained locally from borrow pits. A pumping station was built at Goosepool, four bridges were rebuilt, and several diversions to the course of the river were made. White Cross Bridge was constructed with three pressure syphons, rather than conventional arches. They are protected by screens to prevent debris entering the syphons. Further work was carried out in the later 1940s to deal with subsidence from Bentley Colliery. The banks were raised to cope with both existing subsidence and subsidence which was thought to be likely in the future. Most of the drainage for the area above the East Coast main line railway bridge enters Ea Beck via Goosepool pumping station and Tilts pumping station. Smaller isolated areas are pumped into the Ea Beck by Adwick Mill Dyke pumping station and Tilts Hills pumping station. There are two booster stations at Toll Bar Rugby Club and Hall Villa, which raise water that eventually reaches Tilts pumping station. The villages of Toll Bar and Carcroft are particularly susceptible to flooding because of subsidence, and were both flooded in 1928 when the banks of the Old Ea Beck failed. They were flooded again in 1931, 1932, 1941, 1958 and 2007. Flooding in 1947 resulted in one of the bridges over the Ea Beck partially collapsing.

The Yorkshire Regional Flood Defence Committee approved further modifications to the banks in April 1990, as they were thought to be unstable and in poor condition. The Coal Authority contributed to the cost of the upgrade, because mining subsidence was the main cause of the issues. Some embankments were rebuilt but those between Duck Holt and Tilts Bridge were raised by around 4 feet (1.2 m) to allow for future subsidence. This failed to happen, and the high and narrow banks made maintenance difficult. They were rebuilt at a lower level and with an improved profile in 2011. Some slippage of the left bank near Tilts Lane was also repaired at that time.

There is a network of drains in the area between Arksey and the river, which includes the hamlets of Almholme and Shaftholme. Four pumping stations were built in the area, which are operated by Danvm Drainage Commissioners, but funded by UK Coal, because the subsidence is related to mining. The drains are pumped into Ea Beck by two pumping stations on its right bank, Norwood and Sandall Nooking. Almholme pumping station is located to the south-west of Almholme, and is a booster station which raises water from a particularly low area of land. Flood Evacuation pumping station is also located on the right bank of the river, and is used to speed up the removal of water from Thorpe Marsh Washland, after it has flooded. Negotiations to buy the washlands were nearly complete by the end of 1939. A spillway was constructed near the end of the river so that water can flow over it into low-lying land near Thorpe in Balne and Trumfleet Marshes, once Thorpe Marsh Washlands have become full. This occurred in 2007, when action was also taken to prevent flooding of the Thorpe Marsh electricity sub-station. Emergency defences and pumps were installed to prevent severe disruption to electricity supplies in the area if the sub-station did become flooded.

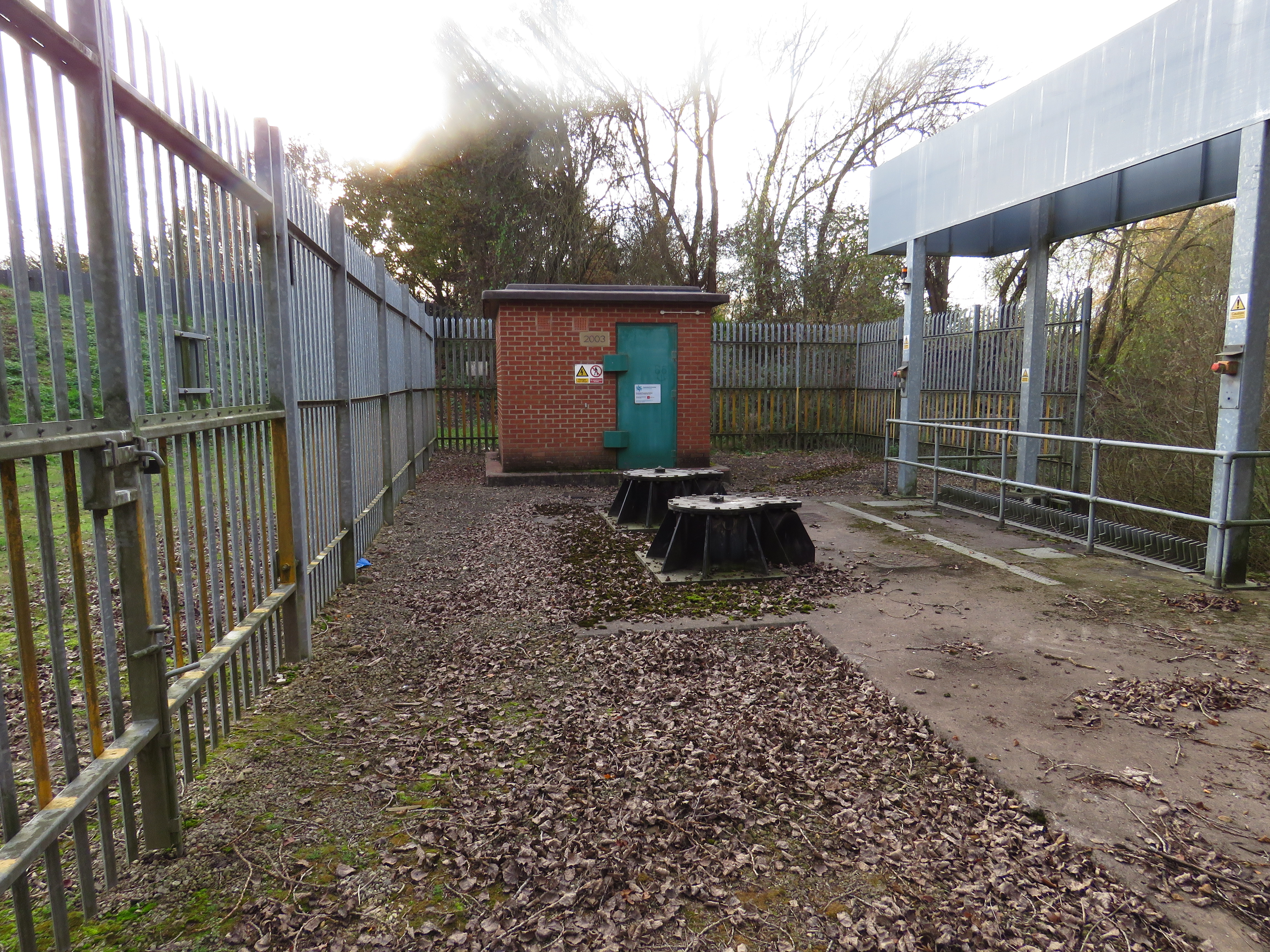
Duckholt pumping station compound, with the pump heads (centre) and the weed screen rake (right)

To the north of the river, there are three separate networks of drains, each with a dedicated pumping station. These are Tilts Bridge, Thornhurst and Duck Holt. Tilts Bridge and Duck Holt are both funded by the Coal Authority, while Thornhurst is funded by Danvm Drainage Commissioners. Much further upstream, there is a small area affected by mining subsidence to the east of South Elmsall. Goosehole pumping station was built to pump surface water from the area into The Beck, and is funded by the Coal Authority.

As the beck is slow moving, the lower reaches nearer to the River Don are colonised by pond water-starwort (callitriche stagnalis). Flooding on the beck is quite common, though in June 2007, water overtopped the banks and inundated the villages of Toll Bar and Bentley. The tidal flood gates at the mouth of the river, were installed to prevent a backflow upriver from the Don. However, as that was already flooded with water from upstream in Sheffield, the gates remained closed and caused flooding along the Beck, causing problems in villages such as Toll Bar. South Yorkshire Fire and Rescue Service deployed firefighters to help pump water away from affected properties, in what was described as "the largest-ever peacetime fire service operation seen in Britain." This prompted the Environment Agency to invest over £3 million in flood defences along the river, which were completed in 2010. The beck was subject to flooding again in November 2019. The history of flooding on the beck has meant Doncaster Council rate the beck as one of its major rivers and as such is monitored closely for any weather events.

== Water quality ==
The Environment Agency measure water quality of the river systems in England. Each is given an overall ecological status, which may be one of five levels: high, good, moderate, poor and bad. There are several components that are used to determine this, including biological status, which looks at the quantity and varieties of invertebrates, angiosperms and fish. Chemical status, which compares the concentrations of various chemicals against known safe concentrations, is rated good or fail.

The water quality of the Ea Beck system was as follows in 2019.

Section	Ecological Status	Chemical Status	Length	Catchment	Channel
Ea Beck from Source to Frickley Beck	Moderate	Fail	7.6 miles (12.2 km)	7.58 square miles (19.6 km^{2})	heavily modified
Frickley Beck from Source to Ea Beck	Poor	Fail	4.0 miles (6.4 km)	5.94 square miles (15.4 km^{2})	
Ea Beck from Frickley Beck to the Skell	Moderate	Fail	3.5 miles (5.6 km)	5.86 square miles (15.2 km^{2})	heavily modified
The Skell from Source to Ea Beck	Moderate	Fail	5.1 miles (8.2 km)	5.57 square miles (14.4 km^{2})	heavily modified
Ea Beck from the Skell to River Don	Moderate	Fail	8.7 miles (14.0 km)	10.81 square miles (28.0 km^{2})	heavily modified

Reasons for the quality being less than good include discharges from sewage treatment works, physical modification of the channel, and runoff from urban areas and agricultural land. Like most rivers in the UK, the chemical status changed from good to fail in 2019, due to the presence of polybrominated diphenyl ethers (PBDE), perfluorooctane sulphonate (PFOS) and mercury compounds, none of which had previously been included in the assessment.

== Settlements ==
- South Kirkby
- South Elmsall
- Hampole
- Skellow
- Toll Bar
- Bentley
- Almholme
- Thorpe in Balne
