= Skellow =

Village in South Yorkshire, England

Coordinates: 53.58°N 1.19°W

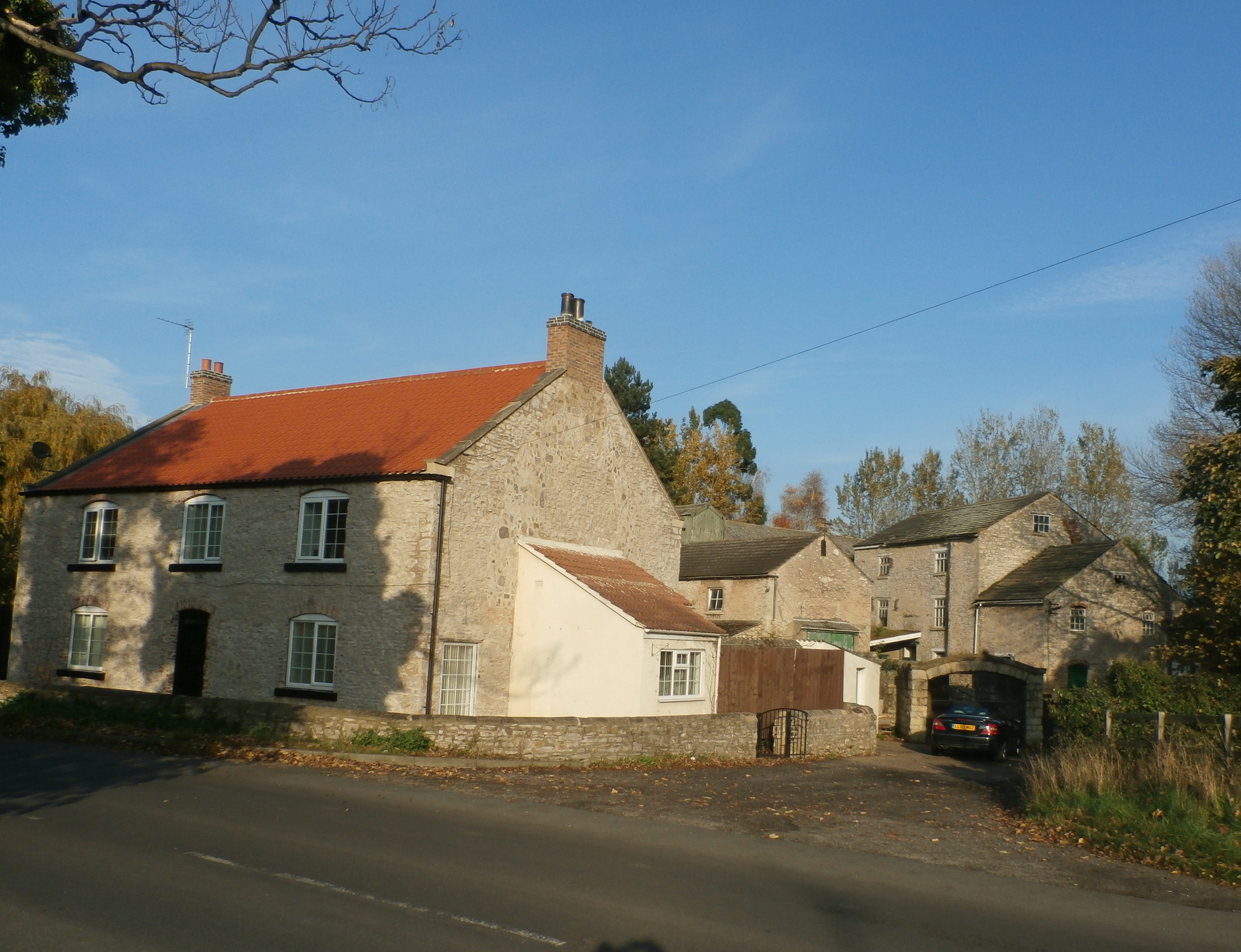
- Skellow Mill

- Location within South Yorkshire
- Population: 4,103 (2009)
- OS grid reference: SE522102
- Metropolitan borough: Doncaster
- Metropolitan county: South Yorkshire
- Region: Yorkshire and the Humber
- Country: England
- Sovereign state: United Kingdom
- Post town: DONCASTER
- Postcode district: DN6
- Dialling code: 01302
- Police: South Yorkshire
- Fire: South Yorkshire
- Ambulance: Yorkshire
- UK Parliament: Doncaster North

Skellow is a village in the Doncaster district, in the county of South Yorkshire, England. Historically part of the West Riding of Yorkshire, the village is roughly 5 miles (8 km) north-west of Doncaster. The village falls in the Askern Spa Ward of Doncaster MBC. To the north and south is mixed farmland, the A1 runs immediately along the western edge of the village, and to the east Skellow merges with the adjacent village of Carcroft along the B1220 road.

As of 2023, the village had a population of 3,800.

== Geography ==
The village derives its name from the River Skell which flows from the nearby village of Skelbrooke, through the locally named 'Five Lanes End' area of Skellow where it joins the Ea Beck, a tributary of the River Don, of which it joins near the former Thorpe Marsh Power Station at Barnby Dun. The village lies on the north side of the east-west Ea Beck valley. To the north-east with access from the village is Burghwallis.

Skellow is well served for open public spaces, with a range of small and medium-sized parks scattered through both the modern housing estates to the west and the older former council estates which border Carcroft. Today most of the western half of Skellow is occupied by a patchwork of late 20th century housing estates.

== History ==
Skellow is mentioned in the Domesday Book as belonging to Ilbert of Lacy, and having villagers, ploughlands, meadows and woodland. The name derives from the nearby River Skell, and various derivations could be behind the name, which Smith suggests is [the] Nook of land or hollow near the Skell (brook). Historically, Skellow was in the Parish of Owston, in the wapentake of Osgoldcross. During the English Civil War, Cromwell placed a cannon battery at the village to protect the Great North Road. The mounds for the cannon still remain and the surrounding area of cottages remain to this day.

Skellow was formerly a township in the parish of Owston, in 1866 Skellow became a separate civil parish, on 1 April 1915 the parish was abolished and merged with Adwick le Street. In 1911 the parish had a population of 760. It is now in the unparished area of Adwick le Street.

On the east bank of the Skell lies Old Skellow, a cluster of older houses facing Skellow Hall. This was also the site of the motte-and-bailey castle and Oliver Cromwell's batteries - of which little remains. The hall was originally built in 1642 and is now uninhabited. This part of Skellow is a conservation area owing to its rich historical roots and links to Cromwell. In fact, Cromwell actually stayed in Skellow Hall during the Civil War. Furthermore, the remains of the Buttercross and old stone walling (which surrounded Skellow Hall) have also survived. Some items of archeological importance have been found in the area.

Godfrey Higgins was the son of the owner of much of the land, known as Skellow Grange, of what is now Skellow Village.

The church of Saint Michael located in the village is a sister church to the nearby Grade I listed Church of All Saints, Owston.

=== Coal mining ===
Further east is a sizeable former council housing estate which is in a generally good state of repair, and a good example of the coal mining related social housing developments typical of the southern part of the West Riding in the early to mid-20th century. This area is the heart of the village, containing most of the local amenities including various shops and the local primary school. Several local clubs exist on the sites of former working men's clubs, and the area has an active local nightlife including live music events.

Coal mining in the area ceased in the 1980s but some remnants from the industry are visible in the area, including winding wheel relics at Bullcroft. Demographic evidence of the former mining community is also evident in both higher than average levels of unemployment, and a strong sense of community with residents knowing their neighbours and those that live around them.

In 2009, the population was estimated to be 4,103 by Doncaster Metropolitan Council. The national censuses record the population of the village within the Askern Spa Ward.

== See also ==
- Listed buildings in Norton and Askern
