= Barnsdale =

Area of South Yorkshire, England

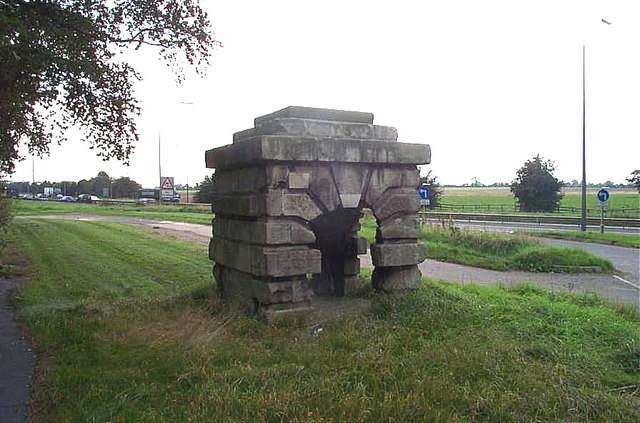
- Robin Hood's Well is on the east of the southbound carriageway of the A1, about 1 mile south of Barnsdale Bar.

- Location within South Yorkshire
- OS grid reference: SE508136
- Metropolitan borough: City of Doncaster; City of Wakefield
- Metropolitan county: South Yorkshire; West Yorkshire
- Region: Yorkshire and the Humber
- Country: England
- Sovereign state: United Kingdom
- Post town: DONCASTER
- Postcode district: DN6
- Dialling code: 01302
- Police: South Yorkshire
- Fire: South Yorkshire
- Ambulance: Yorkshire

Barnsdale, or Barnsdale Forest, is an area of South and West Yorkshire, England. The area falls within the modern-day districts of Doncaster and Wakefield. Barnsdale was historically part of the West Riding of Yorkshire. Barnsdale is commonly associated with Robin Hood.

== Geography ==
Barnsdale historically was in the West Riding of Yorkshire. As there is no village or parish with the name Barnsdale, the area does not have clear boundaries.

Barnsdale Bar is the site of the junction of the A1 (the historic Great North Road), the A639, and Wrangbrook Lane, Woodfield Road and Long Lane (junction 38 of the A1). Bar refers to where there was once a toll gate, now a service station lies just north of the junction, about eight miles north-northwest of Doncaster. There are three limestone quarries nearby, and archeological digs at the site have turned up materials dating back to the Iron Age and Neolithic eras.

Barnsdale Forest refers to the area south of Barnsdale Bar. Despite the name, archeological evidences suggests historically the area was predominantly an agricultural landscape of enclosures, trackways and fields; rather than being covered with trees. The name may derive from the medieval legal sense of "Forest" meaning an area designated for hunting. Maps from 1579 and 1610 show small enclosed areas of woodland in Rutland, one of which is labelled Barnsdale, that were created for hunting and would have been enclosed by earth banks and wooden palings.

=== Notable structures ===
- At Barnsdale Bar there is a 1,226 yards (0.697 miles) railway tunnel, part of the former Hull and Barnsley Railway that closed in 1959.
- The model village of Woodlands lies about 4 miles south of Barnsdale Bar between the Roman Road and the A638 (the "Great North Road").

== Connections between the Barnsdale area and the Robin Hood legend ==
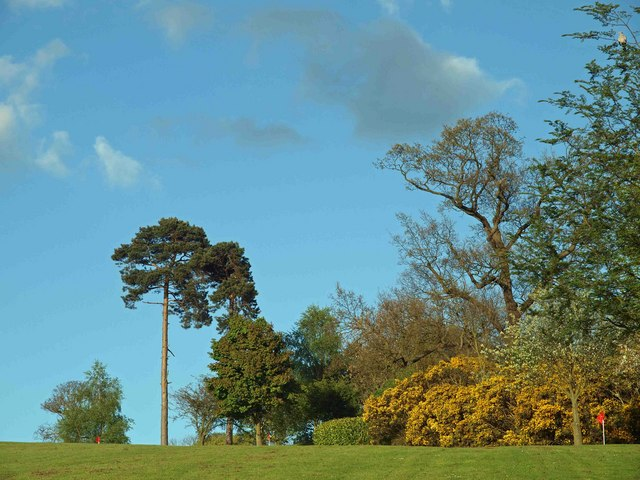
Golf course in Barnsdale

In the earliest medieval ballads of Robin Hood from the fifteenth century, the outlaw is said to have made Barnsdale Forest his abode and base of operations (for example, in "Robin Hood and Guy of Gisbourne", and in "A Gest of Robyn Hode"). Notable locations within the forest of Barnsdale which are directly related to the Robin Hood legend include Wentbridge and Campsall.

There is a Robin Hood's Well, a small monument (apparently designed by John Vanbrugh) lying next to the A1 between the Red House junction and Barnsdale Bar, between the villages of Skelbrooke and Burghwallis. However, it was moved around 1960 when the junction was being constructed, so the real well is actually beneath the A1.

Another well – Little John's Well – lies to the west of Hampole, between Wrangbrook and Skelbrooke (but closer to the latter). It is also called Little John's Cave. Situated by the A638, to the west of Barnsdale, it was once engraved with the outlaw's name, but is now derelict.

South of Barnsdale Bar, the A1 follows the old Roman Ermine Street – north of Barnsdale Bar the A639 follows the course of the Roman Road more closely whilst the A1 follows a more recent route. Several villages and geological features along this route are mentioned in the early ballads of Robin Hood as being places the outlaw visited. Doncaster, farther south, is not mentioned, but is referred to in the names of David of Doncaster, a Merry Man in Robin Hood and the Golden Arrow, and Roger of Doncaster, a villain involved in Robin's murder in A Gest of Robyn Hode and Robin Hood's Death.

In Hanging Wood, also known as Highfields Wood, between Hampole and Highfields, 53°33′39.96″N 1°11′58.68″W a small stream known as Robin Hood's stream springs from underneath the Roman Road and runs into the Pick Burn.
