= Thorpe Marsh Green Energy Hub =

Battery hub in Doncaster, South Yorkshire, England

- Country: United Kingdom
- Location: Doncaster, South Yorkshire
- Coordinates: 53.579743°N 1.103954°W
- Status: Under construction
- Construction began: 2025
- Construction cost: £1.04 billion (2025)
- Owner: EIG Global Energy Partners
- Operator: Fidra Energy

Power generation
- Nameplate capacity: 1,400 MW
- Annual net output: 2 TWh (predicted)
- Storage capacity: 3,100 MWh

Thorpe Marsh Green Energy Hub is a battery energy storage system currently under construction around 4 miles (6.4 km) north of Doncaster, near the villages of Thorpe in Balne and Barnby Dun, in South Yorkshire, England. It is situated on a brownfield site to the west of the remnants of Thorpe Marsh Power Station, and to the east of Yorkshire Wildlife Trust's Thorpe Marsh Nature Reserve.

When completed, the energy hub will be the largest of its kind in the United Kingdom, and one of the largest in Europe and the world, being capable of storing up to 3.1 GWh (11 TJ) of energy at a power of 1.4 GW. This, however, does not make it the UK's largest energy storage site, which, as of September 2025, is Dinorwig Power Station in north Wales, with a capacity of 9.1 GWh (33 TJ). Thorpe Marsh is expected to be capable of exporting 2,000 GWh (7,200 TJ) to the grid per annum.

== History ==
=== Planning and development (2022–2025) ===
The project was first announced by Banks Renewables in October 2022, having acquired the land from Able UK, which had demolished the power station's six cooling towers in 2012. Initially, the plan was to recover up to 2.25 million metric tonnes of pulverised fuel ash which had been deposited on the site during the power station's years of operation. However, by July 2023, this aspect of the project was deemed uneconomical and was therefore abandoned in favour of simply flattening the raised fly ash embankments which intersected the site boundaries. Banks intended to install the batteries and a new substation in the northern part of the site, while improving natural habitats in the south of the site, including the regeneration and protection of existing woodlands, wetlands and grasslands.

Planning permission was applied for by Banks in January 2023. In April 2023, the project received the support of Anthony Sockett, a former councillor and Civic Mayor of Doncaster. In October 2023, the project was sold to West Burton Energy, under its subsidiary, T-Power, with funding from EIG. In October 2024, T-Power was launched by EIG as Fidra Energy, which took full control of the Thorpe Marsh project. The following month, Fidra secured an agreement with Sungrow, a leading Chinese manufacturer in renewables, to be supplied with their 5 MWh (18 GJ) liquid-cooled PowerTitan 2.0 BESS units. In September 2025, Fidra also received financial backing from the National Wealth Fund, bringing its total with EIG investment up to £445 million, plus additional loans of £594 million from international lenders.

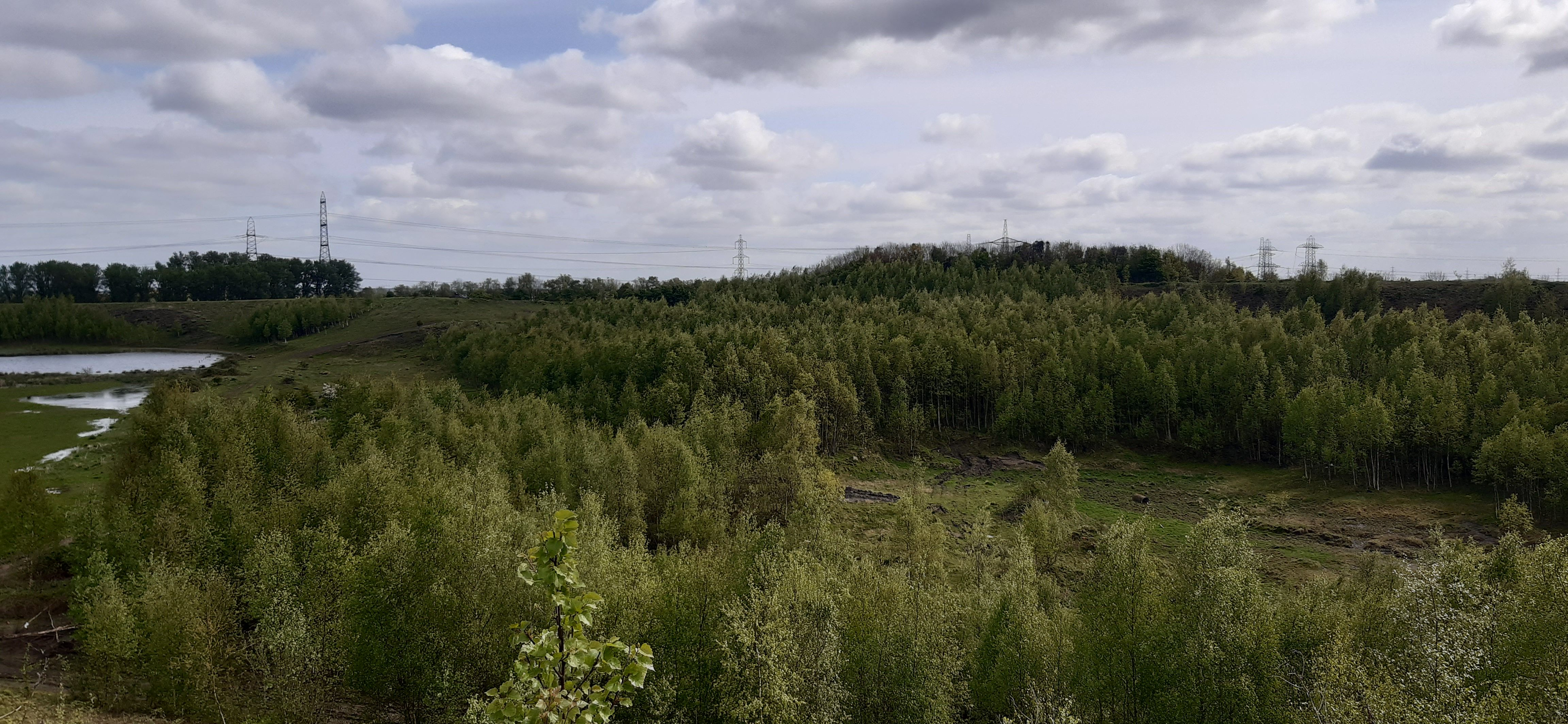
The southern end of the current development area before being cleared

=== Construction (2025–) ===
Planning permission was granted to Fidra in January 2025 and construction began in July of the same year. The site is expected to enter commercial operation by the end of 2027.

== See also ==
- Thorpe Marsh Power Station
- Thorpe Marsh Nature Reserve
