= Thorpe Marsh Nature Reserve =

Nature reserve in South Yorkshire, England

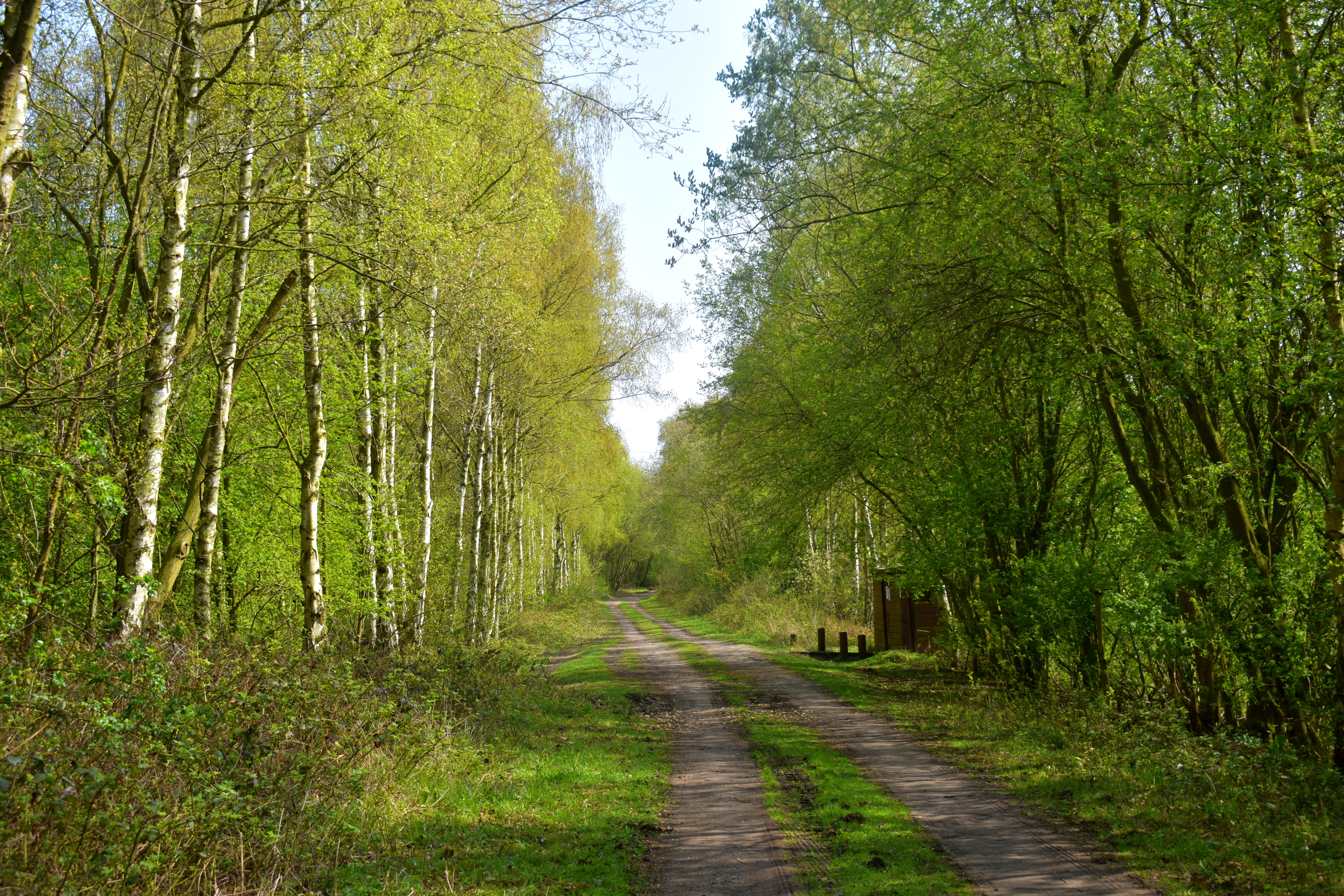

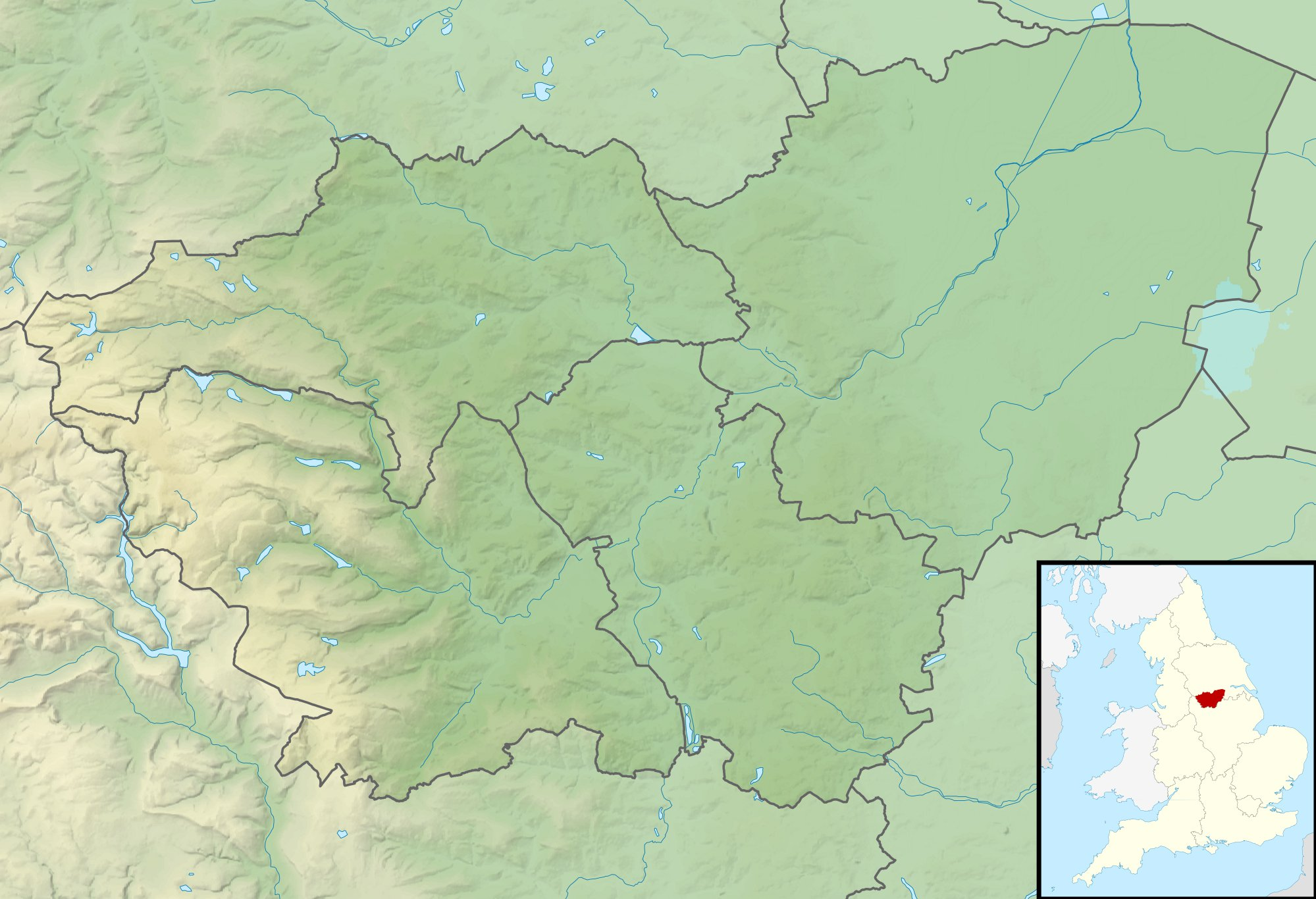
- Location within South Yorkshire
- Type: Nature reserve
- Location: Doncaster, South Yorkshire, England
- OS grid: SE 594088
- Coordinates: 53.579°N 1.116°W
- Area: 77 hectares (190 acres)
- Opened: 16 May 1980
- Manager: Yorkshire Wildlife Trust
- Habitats: Marshland, Woodland

Thorpe Marsh Nature Reserve is a 77-hectare (190-acre) nature reserve located south-west of Thorpe in Balne, north of Doncaster in South Yorkshire, England. The reserve is managed and maintained by a team of volunteers under the Yorkshire Wildlife Trust as well as Doncaster Metropolitan Borough Council.

The reserve shares its name with the coal-fired power station which occupied the adjacent land prior to its closure in 1994 and the demolition of its remaining cooling towers in 2012. The site is on an area of lowland susceptible to flooding (floodplain) by the River Don, thus creating an area of marshland on which the reserve sits (hence the appended "marsh").

== History ==
=== Pre-enclosure (pre–1766) ===
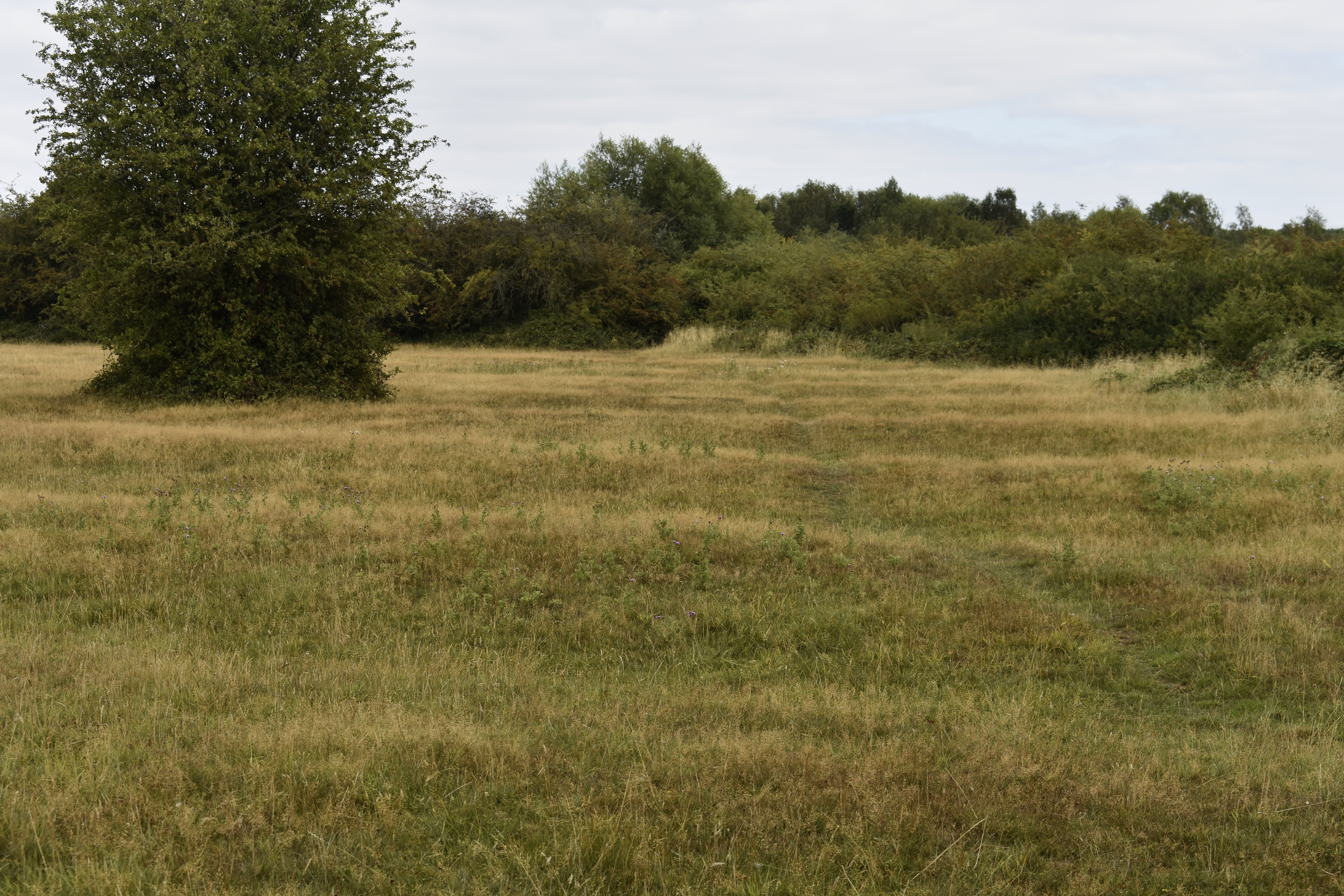
The ridge and furrow archaeological pattern is most prominent in Cockshaw fields.

==== Middle Ages (pre–14th century) ====
During the Middle Ages, Thorpe Marsh was an agricultural site on which farmers used the open field system, creating a ridge and furrow pattern via the use of ploughs. This pattern is still visible today, particularly in Reedholme, Applehurst and Cockshaw fields.

==== Mellish letters & the Foljambe Family ====
In 1731, following the River Dun Navigation Acts of 1725 and 1726, three letters mentioning Thorpe Marsh were addressed to a Joseph Mellish of Doncaster, the likely father of MPs Joseph Mellish and William Mellish, regarding the Navigation Bill. The first letter was dated February 1731 and was written by William Mellish, assumedly addressing the letter to his father. The second letter was dated March 1731 and was written by a T. Yarborough, whilst the third letter was dated April 1731 and written by Edward Simpson, later MP for Dover.

The letters pertain to a cut being made on Thorpe Marsh for the construction of the River Dun Navigation which would conclusively go ahead the following year. The letter composed by Mr Yarborough commented that the cut may be injurious to the estate of one Mr Foljambe, potentially Francis Foljambe of Aldwarke, the maternal grandfather of Francis Ferrand Foljambe MP and patrilineal 7th great-grandson of Sir Godfrey de Foljambe. This letter in conjunction with records held by Foljambe of Osberton implies that the Foljambe family acquired ownership of the Thorpe Marsh area, possibly between 1489 and 1506.

==== Reedholme House (1758–1849) ====
The 1849 Ordnance Survey map of the present-day reserve area marks a ruin in the western end of Reedholme, and evidence of this ruin can still be found in the location as of 2025. The earliest known evidence of a house standing on this site is that of the baptism of Mary Watson on 16 June 1758, whose father - John Watson - is listed as a labourer of Reedholme House. John Watson was approximately 26 years of age at this time; he likely did not own the house, but was more likely employed to either tend to grazing livestock or cultivate crops.

John Watson's family was later succeeded in habitation of Reedholme House by the family of Robert Bean. Bean was recorded twice as living at Reedholme, firstly (as "Readholme") in the baptism of his daughter Martha on 14 June 1767 and secondly (as "Redholme") in the baptism of his daughter Dolly on 13 July 1769. There are no other known names of inhabitants of Reedholme House, however the house itself is mentioned in C. W. Hatfield's 1866 chronicle on the history of otters around Doncaster. It is stated that an otter was caught near the house by Richard Guest and John Tomlinson in "the early 19th century". This suggests that the house may have been inhabited up to this point, before becoming ruined before 1849, but not before the early 1820s when there is recorded "Reedholme, a single house in the township, of Thorpe in Balne, and parish of Barnby Dun".

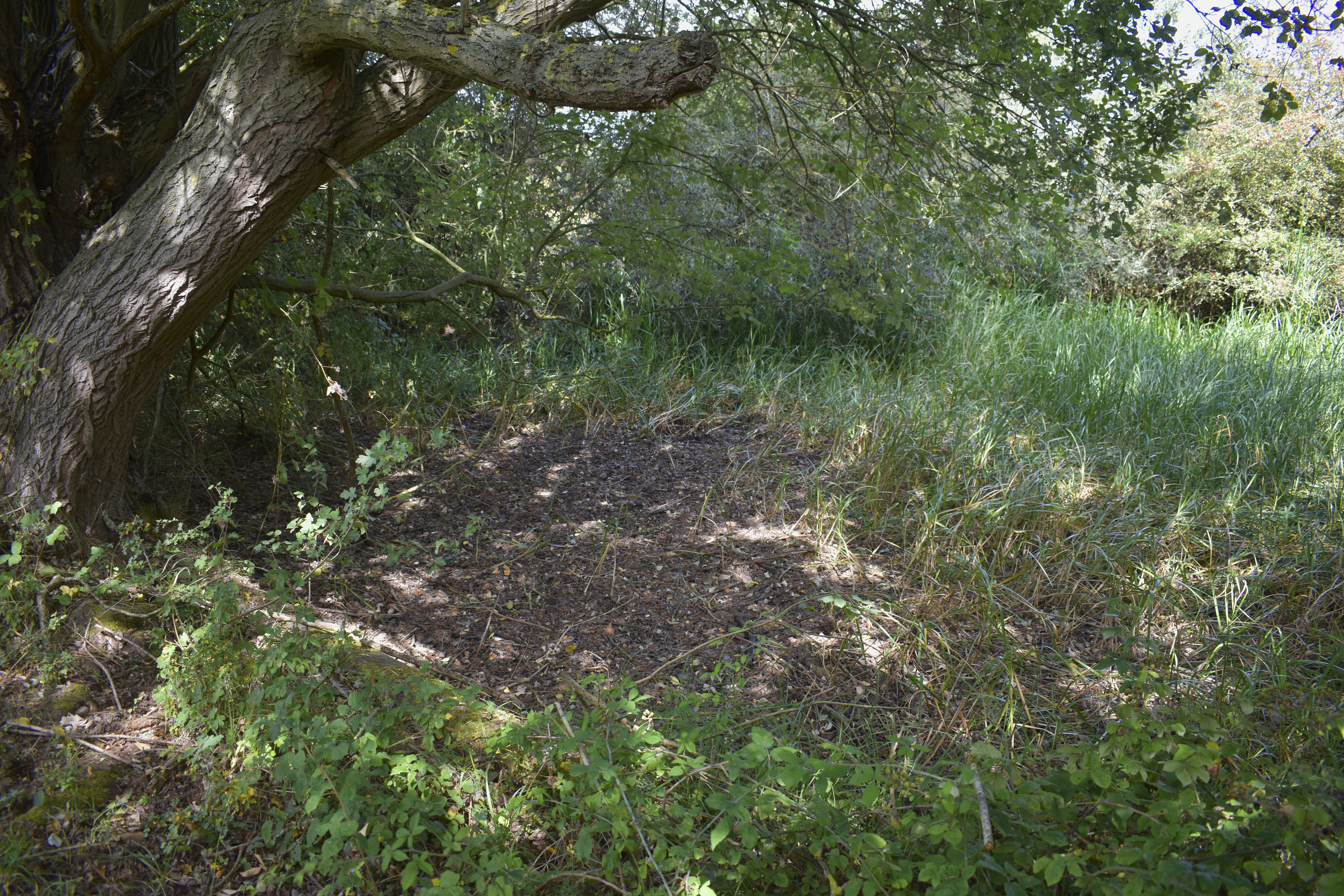
A shallow depression between Reedholme and Applehurst, believed to have once been a flax retting pit.

While these are the only known references to Reedholme House, there is evidence of flax cultivation at "Reedholm Close" in 1791 when Joseph Purslove claimed £5, 10s. and 4d. (approximately equivalent to £567 in June 2025) for growing around two tonnes of flax on the site, and also on Thorpe Marsh. Joseph Burkinshaw of Barnby Dun also claimed for the growth of flax on Thorpe Marsh, while another Arksey claimant, William Barraclough, was awarded for flax growth in "Smallam", which may potentially refer to the present-day area of Smallholme.

==== Ancient origins of place names (1339–1849) ====
The 1731 letters to Joseph Mellish represent the earliest known use of the name Thorpe Marsh, whilst the names of other areas within the reserve have also been in use for centuries; the names Reedholme, Cockshaw, Smallholme and Tilts were all present by 1849. The name Thorpe Marsh is most likely derived from its neighbour village of Thorpe in Balne, whose name emerged no later than 1339 of Norse origin from the original 12th century Latin balneum meaning "bathing place". The use of the names Applehurst ("apple wood"), Reedholme ("water meadow near the reeds") and Smallholme ("narrow water meadow") can be traced to at least circa 1841, 1771 and 1620 respectively. The consistent use of such water-related terminology is indicative of the marish nature of the land – as well as its tendency to flood – drawing parallels to other such flood-prone villages along the Don as Fishlake, Waterside and Arksey.

The origin of the name Cockshaw must precede 1849, and was mentioned in railway and land drainage archives of January 1864 when the deviation of Cockshaw Drain was proposed to accommodate a railway. Prior to the 19th century, it appears to have been referred to as "Cobshire" in the aforementioned 1866 C. W. Hatfield chronicle when referring to Cockshaw Dike.

Sicklecroft, meaning "a farm by a small stream", whose name can be traced definitively to 1848, can also be found in the 1379 Yorkshire Subsidy Rolls in which there is named an inhabitant of Barnby Dun, "Thomas de Sekilcroft", suggesting the name has been in use for at least 650 years.

=== Post-enclosure (1766–1959) ===
==== Pre-industrial (1766–1916) ====
In 1766 a private act of Parliament, the Barnby Dun Inclosure Act 1766 (6 Geo. 3. c. 72 Pr.), was passed for the enclosure of Thorpe Marsh and Grumblehirst (later known as Grumble Hurst); the enclosing freeholder remains unknown, and the present site likely changed hands between 1731 and 1766 as Francis Ferrand Foljambe only inherited estates in Aldwarke, Wadworth, Steeton and Westow. On 16 September 1768, Thorpe Marsh and Grumble Hirst were enclosed and early landowners on the enclosed site include William Fretwell and Thomas Coward, of Barnby Dun and Burghwallis respectively.

By the late 1770s, primary landowners included farmer William Brook – who granted a £240 mortgage on the site to his sisters-in-law, Sarah and Mary Townrow (spinsters from Conisbrough) in 1778 – Joshua Hepworth, William Fores, and Henry Walker Sr.

By 1804, drainage plans were being produced across the area. The Thorpe Marsh area was drained in 1835 under the first iteration of the Dun Drainage Act, enforced by William Pilkington, whilst other areas of the River Don were drained between 1873 and 1879 under the Dun Drainage Amendment Act.

==== Arrival of industry (1916–1959) ====
In 1916 the LNER Gowdall and Braithwell Railway was constructed and opened, and this line intersected the modern day area of the reserve, separating Reedholme and Cockshaw. The line was closed in September 1970, leaving a raised bank running through the reserve which is now known as the Main Embankment and presently serves as a primary artery for nature transects and hide placement.

Widespread flooding across Yorkshire in May 1932, which adversely affected the Bentley and Arksey region, elicited planning at Thorpe Marsh for the construction of a barrier bank on the present-day reserve, now known as Norwood Barrier Bank. These plans came to fruition by 1933, alongside earlier bank raising along the Ea Beck in 1929.

The triangulation station at Cockshaw Dyke in the west of the reserve was computed on 1 June 1949 and underwent maintenance in 1961 however has since been lost, potentially due to dyke works.

=== Thorpe Marsh Power Station (1959–1994) ===
The land to construct a power station on the Thorpe Marsh site was acquired in 1957 and construction began in 1959. Thorpe Marsh Power Station was opened on 2 June 1967 by Ernest G. Boissier.

For most of its history, the present Thorpe Marsh site was most easily accessed from the village of Barnby Dun to the east via Royalty Bridge from Royalty Lane. In 1959, during the construction of Thorpe Marsh Power Station, Fordstead Lane was extended to connect with the villages of Almholme and Arksey. This provided access to Norwood Sluice which had existed since before 1849 as Norwood Foot Bridge and Floodgate and had previously connected to Almholme via footpath. Norwood Gate is now one of four remaining entrances to the nature reserve and is listed by the Yorkshire Wildlife Trust as the reserve's primary entrance.

In the 1960s, land in the present Thorpe Marsh Nature Reserve was purchased by the Central Electricity Generating Board where large volumes of fly ash were tipped. This not only raised the embankment at Thorpe Mere View, but also contributed to the proliferation of a wide range of plant species across the reserve.

Following the closure of Thorpe Marsh Power Station in 1994, the CEBG remained as the freehold owner of the Power Station and Nature Reserve sites.

=== Nature reserve (1980–present) ===
Thorpe Marsh Nature Reserve was opened on 16 May 1980 by countryman, author and television presenter Phil Drabble. The site was initially limited to Thorpe Mere, however was later expanded to include the surrounding coal storage and fly ash deposit areas.

From 1990 onwards, the Central Electricity Generating Board underwent rapid privatisation and broke up into four separate companies. In 1995, following the closure of the power station, Able UK acquired 45 hectares (110 acres) of the power station site. The CEGB conclusively dissolved in 2001 and thus relinquished its remaining ownership of Thorpe Marsh Power Station and Nature Reserve to National Grid, its successor in the energy transmission sector. The Banks Group later acquired freehold ownership of the nature reserve land, and presently leases the land to local farmers. The Environment Agency manages the embankments surrounding the reserve.

In October 2011, permission was acquired by Thorpe Marsh Power Limited to construct the Thorpe Marsh Combined Cycle Gas Turbine Power Station, and further permission to construct the 11.9-mile (19.2 km) Thorpe Marsh Gas Pipeline between the station and the National Transmission System for gas near Camblesforth in Selby, North Yorkshire was acquired in March 2016. Construction was expected to begin in 2022, and the CCGT plant to enter commercial operation in 2023. The company went into liquidation in February 2024 and the CCGT was never constructed.

Between 2021 and 2022, drilling – conducted by Acorn Power Development Limited with equipment from General Electric – was ongoing around the site.

In October 2022, Banks Renewables announced the planning of Thorpe Marsh Green Energy Hub, to be constructed adjacent to the nature reserve, its site boundaries encompassing external nature observation areas. The project was estimated to involve the recovery of up to 2.25 million tonnes of pulverised fuel ash tipped by the CEBG, as well as the saving of over 265,000 tonnes of carbon dioxide via the construction of a 2.8 GWh battery hub in the north of the development area, projected to be the largest of its kind in the United Kingdom and the third largest in the world. The project's management was assumed by Fidra Energy in 2023; planning permission was acquired in January 2025 and construction began in July of the same year. The site is expected to enter commercial operation by the end of 2027.

The nature reserve presently contains six hides for use in birdwatching. These hides are:

- North Mere Hide (overlooking Thorpe Mere) at 53.579911°N 1.111264°W
- Stephen's Hide (overlooking Thorpe Mere) at 53.579802°N 1.108671°W
- Applehurst Pond Hide (overlooking Applehurst Pond) at 53.580256°N 1.111760°W
- South Mere Hide (overlooking Thorpe Mere) at 53.575906°N 1.109138°W
- Sicklecroft Hide (overlooking Sicklecroft) at 53.580366°N 1.109397°W
- The Barry Foster Memorial Hide (overlooking bird feeders in a corner of Reedholme) at 53.579157°N 1.115019°W

West Mere Hide, which overlooked Thorpe Mere, was destroyed by arson on 28 June 2024.

== Flora ==
Thorpe Marsh is home to a variety of plant species. Woodland tree species surrounding the mere include:

- Oak
- Ash
- Hawthorn
- Blackthorn
- Willow
- Birch
- Alder

Other, smaller plant species may be found on the reserve's middle-age ridge-and-furrow corrugations, including but not limited to:

- Adder's tongue fern
- Pepper-saxifrage
- Devil's bit scabious
- Great burnet
- Common figwort
- Cowslip
- Wild carrot
- Common spotted orchid

== Lepidoptera ==
Lepidoptera species counts are frequently recorded at Thorpe Marsh by volunteer wardens in transects. The reserve is home to 21 species of butterfly, with meadow brown being the most frequently-recorded, and small heath being the least frequently-recorded. Over 100 species of moth have been recorded at the reserve, the most common of which is the garden grass-veneer.

The most successful species between 2016 and 2021 at the reserve were small tortoiseshell (+200%), peacock (+13%) and meadow brown (+6%), whilst the least successful were brimstone (−86%), small skipper (−71%) and common blue (−57%).

The most successful year for butterflies since 2002 was 2013 with a total of 4883 individuals recorded, whilst the least successful year was 2009 with a total of 435 individuals recorded. On average, 2130 butterflies are recorded per year. In total, the most frequently-recorded species since 2002 have been:

- Meadow brown (25117 records)
- Gatekeeper (4743 records)
- Speckled wood (4161 records)
- Ringlet (4063 records)
- Green-veined white (2246 records)

The least frequently-recorded species since 2002 have been:

- White-letter hairstreak (one record in 2006)
- Small heath (six records between 2021 and 2023)
- Wall (thirteen records between 2002 and 2004)
- Holly blue (fifteen records between 2006 and 2023)
- Dingy skipper (twenty records between 2017 and 2024)

Other butterflies recorded at the reserve include:

- Brimstone
- Brown argus
- Comma
- Common blue
- Large skipper
- Large white
- Orange tip
- Painted lady
- Peacock
- Purple hairstreak
- Red admiral
- Small copper
- Small skipper
- Small tortoiseshell
- Small white

Thorpe Marsh is among the best locations in south and south-west Yorkshire for the observation of Purple hairstreaks amongst the mature oaks along the main embankment. 231 were recorded on 16 July 2019 (second-highest count in Yorkshire for 2019), 191 on 22 July 2019, 98 on 24 July 2020, and 226 on 19 July 2021.

The first species of the lepidoptera order to be officially recorded at Thorpe Marsh was a Scorched Wing Moth on 1 January 1973.

== Odonata ==
Thorpe Marsh Nature Reserve is home to 19 species of odonata, composed of 7 damselfly species and 12 dragonfly species, the latter of which include 6 hawker species, 3 chaser species, 1 skimmer species and 3 darter species. Damselfly species include:

- Banded demoiselle
- Emerald damselfly
- Large red damselfly
- Red-eyed damselfly
- Blue-tailed damselfly
- Azure damselfly
- Common blue damselfly

Dragonfly species include:

- Common hawker
- Migrant hawker
- Southern hawker
- Brown hawker
- Emperor dragonfly
- Hairy dragonfly
- Four-spotted chaser
- Broad-bodied chaser
- Black-tailed skimmer
- Common darter
- Ruddy darter
- Sympetrum danae

The first species of the odonata order to be officially recorded at Thorpe Marsh was a Blue-tailed Damselfly on 21 June 1970.

== Birds ==
At Thorpe Marsh Nature Reserve, more than 113 species of bird have been recorded since 1980, including 27 birds listed as Red Conservation Status by the RSPB and 41 listed as Amber. Since 1992, over 38692 birds have been ringed.

In 2019, 104 species (17 red, 32 amber) were recorded across 134 days, and 2201 birds were ringed. In 2020, 106 species (16 red, 32 amber) were recorded across 205 days, and 3016 birds were ringed. In 2021, 104 species (21 red, 32 amber) were recorded across 121 days, and 1555 birds were ringed.

A list of birds spotted at the reserve which are denoted as Red Conservation Status are as follows:

- Cuckoo
- Curlew
- Dunlin
- Fieldfare
- Goldeneye
- Grasshopper warbler
- Greenfinch
- Grey partridge
- Herring gull
- House martin
- Lesser redpoll
- Linnet
- Marsh tit
- Mistle thrush
- Ring ouzel
- Common ringed plover
- Scaup
- Skylark
- Smew
- Starling
- Swift
- Tree sparrow
- Turtle doves
- Velvet scoter
- Willow tit
- Woodcock
- Yellowhammer

Other birds which have been recorded at Thorpe Marsh include but are not limited to common tern, great egret, grey wagtail, hobby, kestrel, kingfisher, little egret, marsh harrier, peregrine falcon, ruddy duck, spotted redshank, water rail and wigeon.

The first bird species to be officially recorded at Thorpe Marsh was a little stint on 1 September 1892.
