= Hampole =

Village in South Yorkshire, England

Coordinates: 53.586016°N 1.237426°W

- Village
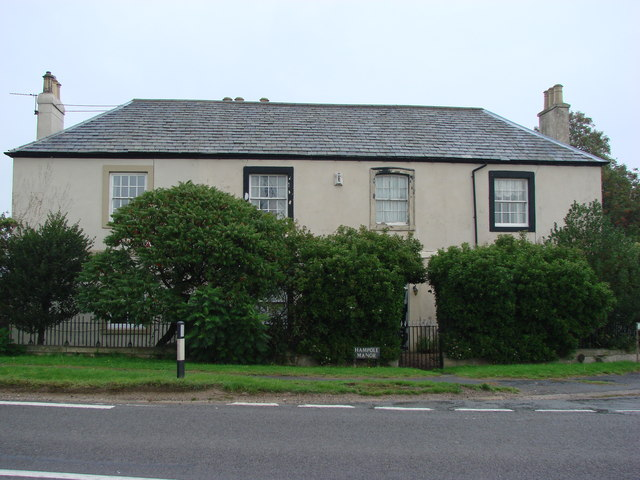
- Hampole Manor

- Location within City of Doncaster Location within South Yorkshire
- Area: 4.16 sq mi (10.8 km^{2})
- Population: 203 (including Skelbrooke, 2011 Census)
  - Density: 49/sq mi (19/km^{2})
- Metropolitan borough: City of Doncaster
- Metropolitan county: South Yorkshire
- Region: Yorkshire and the Humber
- Country: England
- Sovereign state: United Kingdom
- Post town: Doncaster
- Postcode district: DN6
- Dialling code: 01302
- Police: South Yorkshire
- Fire: South Yorkshire
- Ambulance: Yorkshire
- UK Parliament: Doncaster North

Hampole is a small village and civil parish in the City of Doncaster in South Yorkshire, England, close to the border with West Yorkshire. Historically part of the West Riding of Yorkshire, the eastern boundary of the parish is marked by the Great North Road (now the A1), and the parish lies in what was once the Barnsdale Forest. It had a population of 187 in 2001, increasing to 203 at the 2011 Census, which includes the neighbouring village of Skelbrooke. Hampole lies on the A638 between Doncaster and Wakefield.

== History ==
Hampole is mentioned in the Domesday Book as having two ploughlands, woodlands and three villagers. The name of the village derives from the Old English name of Hana and pōl, meaning Hana's pool, the first part being someone's name. The priory at Hampole was founded c. 1153 by Avici de Tania. When the priory was closed during the Dissolution, it had a complement of 14 nuns.

Hampole railway station opened in February 1886 and closed on 7 January 1952.

The parish includes the villages of Hampole, Skelbrooke and Barnsdale. The parish of Hampole is part of the Sprotbrough Ward of Doncaster Council.

By the A1 road, near Skelbrooke, is Robin Hood's Well, with its stone cover designed by John Vanbrugh. Little John's Well lies to the west of Hampole village.

Hampole lies about two miles north west of the model village of Woodlands; and of Highfields Wood, where there is a brook known as Robin Hood's Brook.

Notable buildings include the Grade II listed Church of St Michael and All Angels in Skelbrooke, Hampole Manor with Hampole Manor Cottage, and an 18th-century barn on Steep Hill Lane. To the south of the village is the Hampole Wind Farm, run by the company Good Energy. The site, which started generating in spring 2014, consists of four turbines generating enough electricity to power 5,400 homes per year.

== See also ==
- Robin Hood
- Richard Rolle
- Listed buildings in Hampole
