= Hampole railway station =

Disused railway station in South Yorkshire, England

Hampole
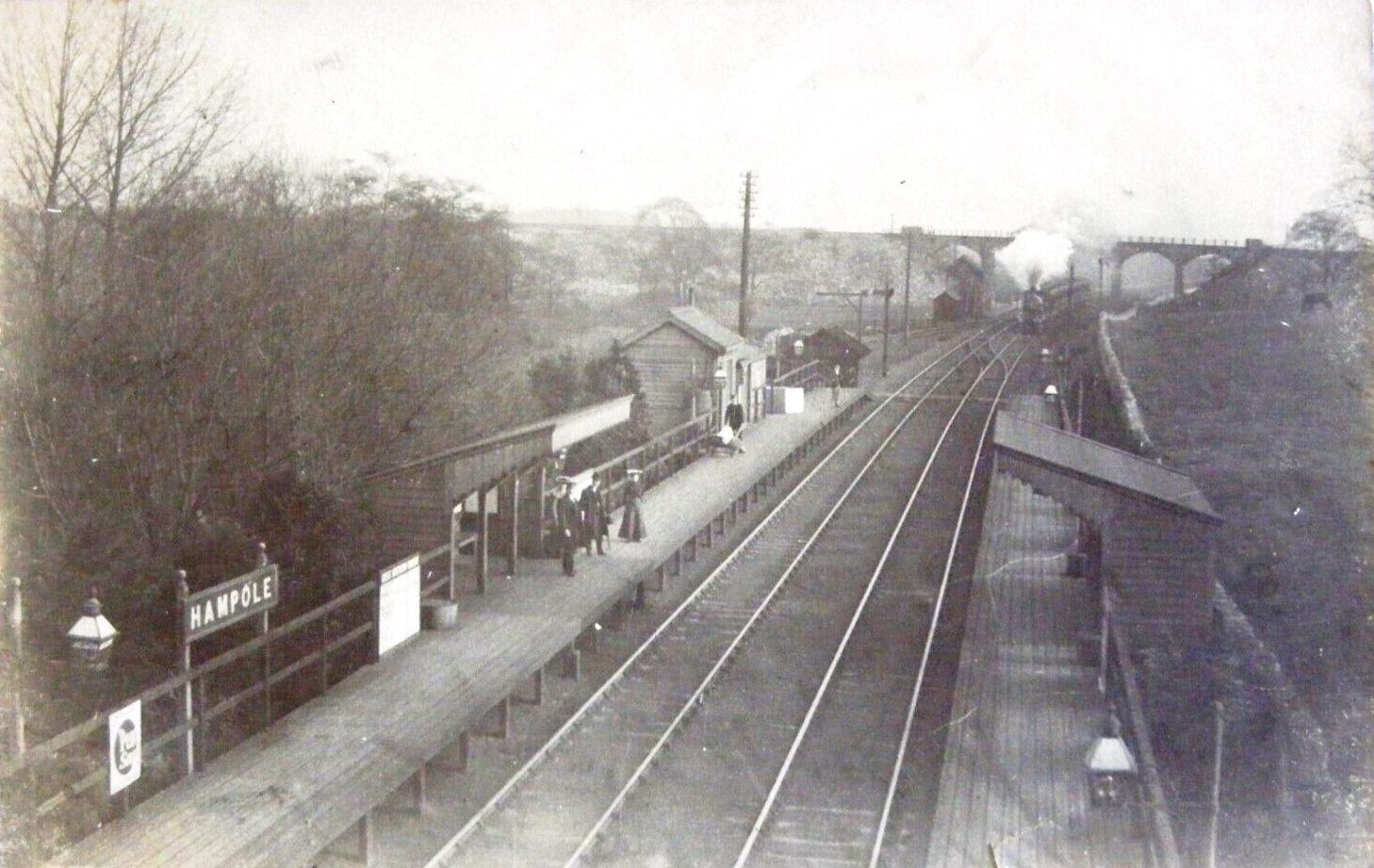

General information
- Location: Hampole, Doncaster; England
- Coordinates: 53.58780°N 1.23370°W
- Grid reference: SE508104
- Platforms: 2

Other information
- Status: Disused

History
- Pre-grouping: West Riding and Grimsby Railway

Key dates
- 1885: opened
- 1952: closed
Location

Hampole railway station was situated on the main line of the West Riding and Grimsby Railway between Carcroft & Adwick-le-Street and South Elmsall. It was close by and served the village of Hampole, near Doncaster, South Yorkshire, England.

The station, opened in January 1885, was a simple affair with wooden platforms and waiting shelters. There was a separate station master's house, which was situated at the roadside by the station approach.

The station closed on 7 January 1952.

Preceding station	Historical railways	Following station
Adwick	Great Northern Railway; West Riding and Grimsby Railway	South Elmsall
