= Listed buildings in Burghwallis =

Burghwallis is a civil parish in the metropolitan borough of Doncaster, South Yorkshire, England. The parish contains ten listed buildings that are recorded in the National Heritage List for England. Of these, one is listed at Grade I, the highest of the three grades, one is at Grade II*, the middle grade, and the others are at Grade II, the lowest grade. The parish contains the village of Burghwallis and the surrounding area. Most of the listed buildings are in the village, and consist of a church, the ruins of a cross and a gravestone in the churchyard, the former rectory, houses, a pinfold, and a war memorial, and outside the village are a well head and a mill building.

== Key ==
Grade	Criteria
I	Buildings of exceptional interest, sometimes considered to be internationally important
II*	Particularly important buildings of more than special interest
II	Buildings of national importance and special interest

== Buildings ==
Name and location	Photograph	Date	Notes	Grade
St Helen's Church; 53.60209°N 1.18996°W		10th to 11th century	The church was extended and altered through the centuries, and was restored in 1883–85 by J. L. Pearson. It is built in stone with red tile roofs, and consists of a nave with a south porch, a chancel with a north vestry, and a west tower. The tower has three stages, the lower stages from the 13th century, and the top stage from the 15th century. There are string courses between the stages, loops in the west and south sides, and a circular window in the middle stage on the north side. At the top are gargoyles, and an embattled parapet with eight crocketed pinnacles. The gabled porch has an outer doorway with a pointed arch and an altered Saxon inner doorway.	I
Churchyard cross 53.60195°N 1.19001°W	—	Late medieval (probable)	The remains of the cross are in the churchyard of St Helen's Church, and are in magnesian limestone. They consist of a square base and part of a chamfered shaft, on which has been erected a 20th-century crucifix.	II
St. Anne's Rest Home; 53.60174°N 1.19107°W		Early 16th century (probable)	A large house, originally Burghwallis Hall, and later used for other purposes, it was extended in 1717, and altered in about 1820. It is in magnesian limestone with a tile roof, and has two storeys and attics, and an H-shaped plan. The original part has five bays, and the 18th-century addition is a range parallel to the south cross-wing. The entrance front has a chamfered plinth and quoins, and on the front is a 19th-century porch with a moulded arch and diagonal buttresses rising as spirelets. The windows are sashes, and in the attic is a three-light mullioned window. At the rear are gabled three-storey stair turrets, and in the left return are five gables.	II*
Home Farmhouse; 53.60063°N 1.19333°W	—	Mid 17th century	The farmhouse is rendered, with stone slate eaves courses, and a pantile roof with coped gables. There are two storeys, a main range of four bays, a single-bay extension on the left, and a later single-bay extension at the rear on the right. The doorway has a quoined chamfered surround, a deep lintel, and a hood mould. The windows are casements, either with a single light, or mullioned, with hood moulds.	II
Robin Hood's Well; 53.59976°N 1.21713°W		c. 1710	A well house designed by John Vanbrugh in magnesian limestone. It has a square plan, and three rusticated open round arches, with an impost band, and pendant keystones. On the top are three steps, and inside is an arched niche.	II
Pinfold; 53.60005°N 1.19385°W	—	Mid 18th century or earlier	The pinfold is an enclosure with limestone walls and a U-shaped plan. It is about 5.7 metres (19 ft) wide, and the walls have round coping. There are steps at the west end, and an entrance in the southwest corner. In the middle of the pinfold is a stone-lined trough fed by a natural spring, and against the west wall is a platform.	II
Coward family gravestone 53.60205°N 1.18984°W	—	Late 18th century	The gravestone is in the churchyard of St Helen's Church, and is to the memory of members of the Coward family. It is in stone, and consists of a horizontal rectangular slab with inscriptions, a scrolled pediment, and roundels in the top corners.	II
Mill building, Skellow Mill; 53.59160°N 1.20231°W		c. 1800	A former corn mill, it is in limestone, with quoins, and a stone slate roof. There are three storeys, three bays, and a two-storey, single-bay wing on the left. In the centre of the main block is a round-arched doorway with a quoined surround, the middle floor contains double doors, and the windows are casements. In the gable end of the wing are two segmental-headed doorways, a casement window, and a dovecote opening in the gable.	II
The Old Rectory and St. Anthony's; 53.60248°N 1.18947°W		1815	The former rectory has been divided into three dwellings. It is in roughcast brick, with roofs of Welsh slate and tile. The Old Rectory has two storeys and attics, three bays on the front and two on the sides, and St Anthony's, recessed on the left, has three storeys and five bays. The Old Rectory has a plinth, an eaves cornice, and coped gables. On the front is a central porch, double doors with a fanlight, and a pedimented gable, and the windows are sashes. The right return has a pedimented gable with an oculus in the tympanum. St Anthony's has a central wooden porch, and a mix of sash and casement windows.	II
War memorial 53.60037°N 1.19528°W		1922	The war memorial stands in a small enclosure at a fork in the road. It is in Portland stone, and consists of a Celtic cross on a tapering shaft on a two-stepped plinth. On the front of the cross are interwoven Celtic patterns. The shaft contains two panels, the upper one with an inscription, and the lower with the names of those lost in the First World War. On the left return is a panel with the names of those lost in the Second World War. The memorial is enclosed by coped limestone walls, and the double metal gates have roundels with poppies.	II
