= Listed buildings in Doncaster (Bentley Ward) =

Bentley is a ward in the metropolitan borough of Doncaster, South Yorkshire, England. The ward contains 22 listed buildings that are recorded in the National Heritage List for England. Of these, one is listed at Grade I, the highest of the three grades, and the others are at Grade II, the lowest grade. The ward contains the suburb of Bentley, the villages of Almholme, Arksey, and Toll Bar, and the surrounding area. There is a group of listed buildings in Arksey, including the church, the vicarage, the former school and its wall, a group of almshouses, a hall, and a pinfold. Elsewhere, the listed buildings include another church, another pinfold, houses and cottages, a former watermill, farmhouses and farm buildings, a road causeway, a road bridge, and four mileposts.

== Key ==
Grade	Criteria
I	Particularly important buildings of more than special interest
II	Buildings of national importance and special interest

== Buildings ==
Name and location	Photograph	Date	Notes	Grade
All Saints Church, Arksey; 53.55582°N 1.12717°W		12th century	The church has been extended and altered through the centuries, and it was restored in 1868–70 by George Gilbert Scott. It is built in magnesian limestone with lead roofs, and has a cruciform plan, consisting of a nave with a clerestory, north and south aisles, a south porch, north and south transepts, a chancel with north and south chapels, and a tower at the crossing. The tower has a south doorway with a pointed arch, a southwest stair projection, a clock face on the south side, gargoyles, an embattled parapet with crocketed pinnacles, and a short recessed octagonal spire with lucarnes. The porch and the parapets on the body of the church also are embattled and have crocketed pinnacles.	I
Stockbridge Farmhouse; 53.55280°N 1.13450°W		Early 17th century	The farmhouse is pebbledashed, on a chamfered plinth, and has a tile roof with moulded gable copings and shaped kneelers. There are two storeys and an attic, a double-depth plan, and three bays. The central doorway has a fanlight, a moulded lintel, and a hood mould with lozenge-shaped stops. The windows are sashes.	II
29 and 35 High Street, Arksey; 53.55639°N 1.12726°W	—	17th century	A pair of houses at right angles to the street; No. 35 is dated 1667. They are in limestone, with quoins, a stone slate eaves course, and a pantile roof. There are two storeys, and each house has three bays. The doorways have chamfered and quoined surrounds, and the windows are chamfered and mullioned, some with hood moulds.	II
Bentley Mill	—	17th century	A former water mill, it is in magnesian limestone, with dressings in stone and brick, quoins, and a pantile roof with coped gables and kneelers. There are three storeys and two bays. The doorway has a chamfered quoined surround and a deep two-piece lintel with a cambered soffit, and to the right is a three-light mullioned window. In the upper floors are windows with cambered arches. On the left is a wheel-pit lining.	II
Farm building range, Stockbridge Farm; 53.55305°N 1.13465°W		17th century	The farm buildings are in limestone, with stone slate eaves courses, a pantile roof with coped gables, and two storeys. The openings include double doors with a wooden lintel, a doorway with a quoined and chamfered surround and a cambered lintel, mullioned and single-light windows, and slit vents, and there are external steps on the front.	II
Cooke's Almshouses; 53.55548°N 1.12786°W		1660	The gateway to the almshouses was rebuilt in 1736. The almshouses are in rendered magnesian limestone, and have tile roofs with moulded gable copings and shaped kneelers. They consist of twelve single-storey dwellings on three sides of a quadrangle. The quadrangle is closed by wing walls, and a sandstone archway, with a projecting keystone, a pulvinated frieze, an inscribed plaque, and a cartouche under a coped gable. Each dwelling has a doorway with a chamfered lintel, and a three-light mullioned window, and at the rear is a round-headed passageway.	II
Old Village School House; 53.55533°N 1.12759°W		1683	The school, which was extended in the 19th century and later used for other purposes, is in magnesian limestone, with quoins, and a Welsh slate roof with triangular gable copings and shaped kneelers. There is one storey, five bays, and a rear wing on the right. The central doorway has a moulded surround, a pulvinated frieze, and a broken segmental pediment. The outer bays contain two-light mullioned windows with trefoil-headed lights, and above is a continuous hood mould.	II
Wall, Old Village School House; 53.55525°N 1.12736°W	—	Late 17th or early 18th century	The wall that encloses the yard at the front of the former school is in magnesian limestone, with quoins and copings. It is about 1.5 metres (4 ft 11 in) high, and has an L-shaped plan. The entrances are flanked by piers.	II
Brook House Farmhouse; 53.55607°N 1.12580°W	—	1812	The farmhouse is rendered, on a plinth, with a floor band, overhanging eaves, and a hipped Welsh slate roof. There are two storeys, fronts of two and three bays, and a single-storey rear block. The central doorway has a fanlight and a cornice, and the windows are sashes. At the rear is a date plaque.	II
Arksey Hall; 53.55722°N 1.12507°W		Early 19th century	A large house on an earlier core, later used for other purposes, it is rendered, and has a hipped tile roof. There are two storeys, fronts of five bays, a double-pile plan, and a single-storey extension on the right. The porch has a Tuscan porch, and a doorway with a fanlight. To the left of the doorway is a round-headed stair window, and the other windows are a mix of sashes and casements. In the left return is a doorway with a canopy, and in the right return is a round-headed doorway with a fanlight.	II
Bentley Pinfold; 53.54684°N 1.14403°W	—	Early 19th century	The pinfold is a rectangular enclosure with rounded corners. It is surrounded by a magnesian limestone wall with sandstone copings, and is about 1.5 metres (4 ft 11 in) high. At the northwest corner is a gate hung on monolithic jambs.	II
Arksey Pinfold; 53.55383°N 1.12259°W	—	Early 19th century (probable)	The pinfold is a circular enclosure about 11 metres (36 ft) in diameter. It is surrounded by a magnesian limestone wall with sandstone copings, and is about 2 metres (6 ft 7 in) high. On the north side is a gateway flanked by large monolithic jambs with domed copings.	II
Causeway; 53.53267°N 1.14481°W		1832–33	The causeway carries Bentley Road (A19 road) over the flood plain of the River Don. It is in sandstone, and consists of an arcade of 30 segmental arches, with a skew arch at the north end. There is a continuous band beneath the parapet, which has domed coping, and there are piers at intervals.	II
Milepost near Toll Bar; 53.56916°N 1.15717°W		1832–33	The milepost is on the east side of the A19 road. It is in magnesian limestone, and consists of a short pillar with a rectangular plan and a rounded head. It is inscribed with the distances to Doncaster, Askern, Selby and York.	II
Milepost opposite Rosendale Road; 53.55581°N 1.14925°W		1832–33	The milepost is on the east side of Askern Road (A19 road). It is in magnesian limestone, and consists of a short pillar with a rectangular plan and a triangular head. It is inscribed with the distances to Doncaster, Askern, Selby and York.	II
Road bridge 53.52999°N 1.14481°W	—	1832–33	The bridge is in sandstone with a brick soffit, and consists of two segmental arches. It has rusticated voussoirs flanked by projecting piers linked by band, and the parapet has domed copings.	II
Arksey Vicarage; 53.55553°N 1.12656°W		1833–35	The vicarage is in magnesian limestone on a chamfered plinth and with a tile roof. There are two storeys, a double-depth plan, and three bays, the middle bay narrower, projecting and gabled. The central doorway has a chamfered surround, a triangular head, and a hood mould. The windows are mullioned, the lights with pointed heads and containing sashes. In the left return is a French window.	II
Low Farmhouse; 53.56514°N 1.10882°W		Early to mid 19th century	The farmhouse is stuccoed, with rusticated quoins, a floor band, projecting eaves, and a hipped tile roof. There are two storeys, fronts of three and two bays, and a lower two-storey rear wing on the left. The central doorway has a double chamfered surround, and is flanked by narrow casement windows under a common hood mould. The other windows are two- or three-light mullioned casements with hood moulds.	II
Shaftholme House Farmhouse; 53.56715°N 1.13132°W	—	Mid 19th century	The farmhouse is in sandstone on a plinth, with a floor band, projecting eaves, and a hipped Welsh slate roof. There are two storeys, three bays, and a single-storey recessed right wing. In the centre is a gabled porch and a doorway with a triangular head. The windows on the front are two-light casements with mullions, and the lights have flattened ogee heads. At the rear are sash windows.	II
Milepost near Lady Pitt's Bridge; 53.53253°N 1.15397°W		Late 19th century	The milepost is on the northeast side of York Road (A638 road). It is in gritstone with cast iron overlay, and has a triangular plan and a rounded top. On the top is inscribed "TADCASTER & DONCASTER R0AD" and "BENTLEY WITH ARKSEY", on the left side is the distance to Doncaster, and on the right side are the distances to York, Tadcaster, Wakefield, Leeds, and Pontefract.	II
Milepost near junction with Pickerings Lane; 53.54303°N 1.17095°W		Late 19th century	The milepost is on the northeast side of York Road (A638 road). It is in gritstone with cast iron overlay, and has a triangular plan and a rounded top. On the top is inscribed "TADCASTER & DONCASTER R0AD" and "BENTLEY WITH ARKSEY", on the left side is the distance to Doncaster, and on the right side are the distances to York, Tadcaster, Wakefield, Leeds, and Pontefract.	II
St Peter's Church, Bentley; 53.54400°N 1.14719°W		1891–94	The church is in sandstone with red tile roofs, and is in Gothic Revival style. It consists of a nave, north and south aisles, a southwest porch rising to a steeple, a north porch, and a chancel with a north organ chamber and vestry. The steeple has a tower with full-height angle buttresses, clock faces, and a broach spire with lucarnes. At the west end are four two-light windows flanked by buttresses, above them is a circular window containing quatrefoils, and at the east end is a five-light window.	II
