= Little John's Well =

Well in South Yorkshire, England

Coordinates: 53.592051°N 1.247796°W

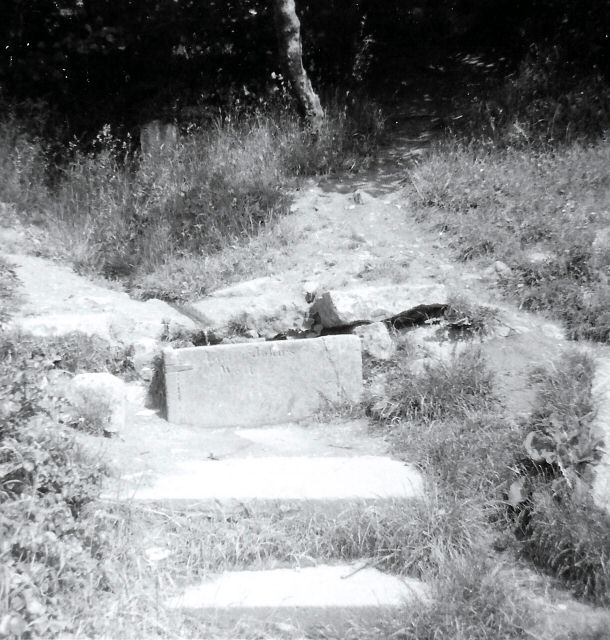
Little John's Well (1967)

Little John's Well is a water well situated near to the A638 at Hampole, in the Metropolitan Borough of Doncaster, in what was known as Barnsdale Forest.

== See also ==
- Little John
- Robin Hood
- Robin Hood's Well
