= Listed buildings in Hampole =

Hampole is a civil parish in the metropolitan borough of Doncaster, South Yorkshire, England. The parish contains ten listed buildings that are recorded in the National Heritage List for England. All the listed buildings are designated at Grade II, the lowest of the three grades, which is applied to "buildings of national importance and special interest". The parish contains the villages of Hampole and Skelbrooke, and the surrounding countryside. Most of the listed buildings are houses and associated structures and farm buildings, and the others consist of a seat by a well, a church, and two grave slabs in the churchyard.

== Buildings ==
Name and location	Photograph	Date	Notes
Two grave slabs 53.60295°N 1.22877°W	—	Medieval	The grave slabs are in the churchyard of St Michael's Church, and are in limestone. Both slabs are tapered, they are incised with a foliate cross, and the southern slab also has a sword.
Seat at Little John's Well; 53.59206°N 1.24780°W		17th century (probable)	The remains of the seat are in limestone. They consist of an upright slab with an irregularly-shaped head and a recessed panel on one side. The panel contains a carving with initials and a rose in a shield.
Stubbs Hall; 53.59405°N 1.25088°W	—	Late 17th century	The house was extended in the 19th century by the addition of a front range. It is in sandstone with two storeys, a front of five bays, and with the older range parallel at the rear with a rear wing. The front range is in Tudor Revival style, and has a chamfered plinth, a string course, and corner piers rising to embattled turrets. At the top is a cornice, and an embattled parapet stepped up in the centre over a blank shield. The porch has a Tudor arched doorway with a hood mould and buttresses, and the windows are sashes with chamfered surrounds and hood moulds.
East barn, Hill Farm; 53.60784°N 1.23052°W	—	Early 18th century	The barn is in limestone, with quoins, stone slate eaves courses, and a pantile roof with coped gables and shaped kneelers. There are two storeys and six bays, with an added bay on the left. The barn contains a cart entry with a cambered wood lintel, two doorways, a casement window, boarded hatches, and slit vents.
West barn, Hill Farm; 53.60787°N 1.23096°W	—	Early 18th century	The barn is in limestone, with quoins, stone slate eaves courses, and a pantile roof with coped gables and shaped kneelers. There are two storeys and six bays. The barn contains a cart entry, two doorways, one with a segmental head, a casement window, and slit vents.
Skelbrooke Hall; 53.60462°N 1.22872°W	—	Early 18th century	A country house in limestone on a chamfered plinth, with quoins, a modillion eaves cornice, and a hipped tile roof. There are three storeys, five bays, a single-bay recessed projection on the left with a single-storey block in the angle. The enclosed porch has Doric columns, double doors with a fanlight, and a pediment, and the windows are sashes. At the rear are external steps, and in the right return are two round-headed stair windows.
Gate piers and walls, Skelbrooke Hall; 53.60497°N 1.23024°W	—	Late 18th century (probable)	The central gate piers flanking the entrance to the drive are in sandstone, and each pier has a plinth, a rusticated shaft, a band above and below a frieze block, and a ball finial. Concave coped walls lead to end piers, the pier on the right without a finial, and the pier on the left is rendered.
Ye Old Stables; 53.60510°N 1.22893°W	—	Late 18th century	Part of the former stable block of Skelbrooke Hall converted for residential use, the building is in limestone on a plinth, and has a stone slate roof with a coped gable and shaped kneelers on the right. There are two storeys and seven bays. On the front are three doorways with fanlights, linked by a continuous impost band. The windows are sashes, those in the ground floor with round-arched heads and fanlights.
Hampole Manor and Cottage; 53.58623°N 1.23739°W		Early 19th century	A house, later divided, it is rendered, and has a two-span hipped Westmorland slate roof. There are two storeys and four bays. The doorway has a fanlight and a cornice, and the windows are sashes, one with a segmental-arched architrave.
St Michael's Church, Skelbrooke; 53.60290°N 1.22897°W		1871–72	The church was rebuilt after a fire, re-using some medieval fabric. It is built in limestone with red tile roofs, and consists of a nave with a south porch, a chancel with a separate north chapel and a projection to the south, and a west tower. The tower has a chamfered plinth, quoins, and a west doorway above which is a three-light window. The bell openings have two lights and pointed heads, and over them is a band with carved bosses, an embattled parapet, and pinnacles. The porch is gabled and contains a statue of an angel with a shield, and on the south side is a stair turret.
