= Toll Bar =

Village in South Yorkshire, England

Coordinates: 53.565°N 1.155°W

- Hamlet
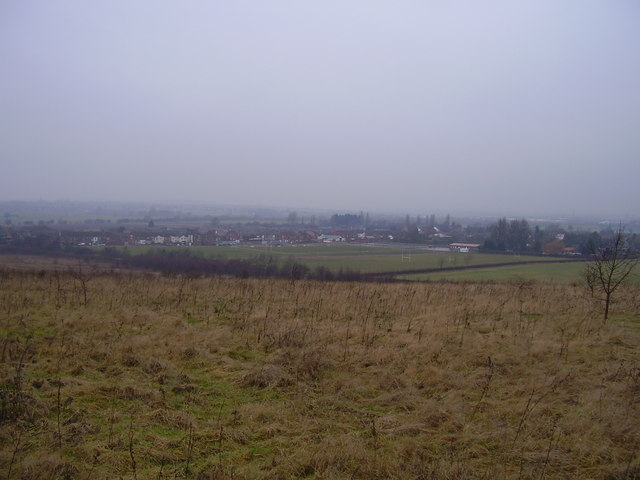
- Toll Bar viewed from Bentley Community Woodland

- Location within South Yorkshire
- Area: 0.13 sq mi (0.34 km^{2})
- Population: 1,226 (2011 census)
  - Density: 9,431/sq mi (3,641/km^{2})
- OS grid reference: SE561079
  - London: 145 mi (233 km) SSE
- Metropolitan borough: Doncaster
- Metropolitan county: South Yorkshire
- Region: Yorkshire and the Humber
- Country: England
- Sovereign state: United Kingdom
- Post town: DONCASTER
- Postcode district: DN5
- Dialling code: 01302
- Police: South Yorkshire
- Fire: South Yorkshire
- Ambulance: Yorkshire

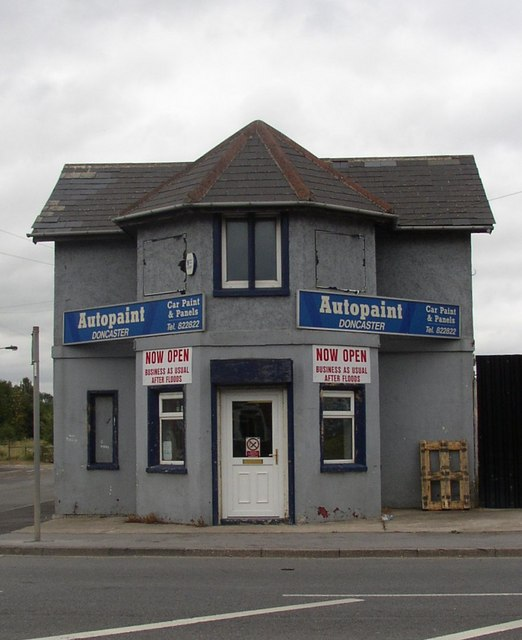
The toll house after which the hamlet was named

Toll Bar is a semi-rural hamlet in the City of Doncaster local government area, South Yorkshire, England. It is situated on the A19 road, and approximately 3 miles (5 km) north from the city of Doncaster, and adjacent to Bentley. Toll Bar had a population of 1,226 in the 2011 census.

On 25 June 2007 the Ea Beck overflowed and flooded the village.

The village school is Toll Bar Primary School. In 2014, about one third of its pupils had a Romany or Gypsy background. The school has been rated as good by Ofsted. Toll Bar also has a post office.

== See also ==
- Listed buildings in Doncaster (Bentley Ward)
