= Robin Hood's Well =

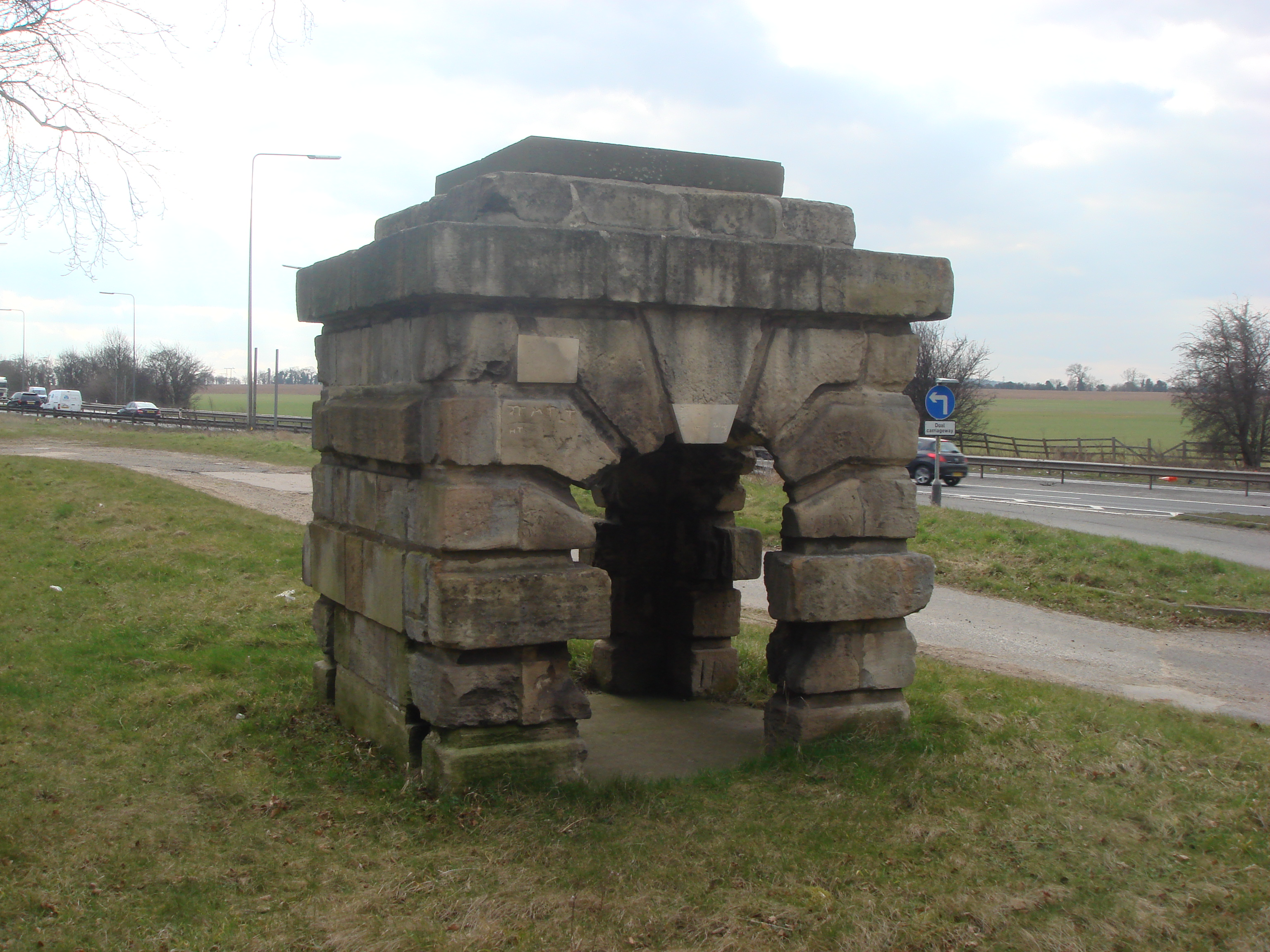
- Robin Hood's Well, picture taken from rear to show dual carriageway in background

- Location within South Yorkshire
- 53°35′59.1″N 01°13′01.7″W
- Location: Burghwallis, South Yorkshire

History
- Built: 1710

Site notes
- Architect: Sir John Vanbrugh

Listed Building – Grade II
- Official name: Robin Hood's Well
- Designated: 5 June 1968
- Reference no.: 1314882

Robin Hood's Well is a historic structure beside the A1 road near Burghwallis, South Yorkshire, England. It was originally built in 1710 as a well house over a spring alongside the old Great North Road, but the structure was moved to its present location alongside the Doncaster By-Pass in what is known as Barnsdale (sometimes Barnsdale Forest).

== Description ==
Robin Hood's Well is an ornamental well cover that was designed by Sir John Vanbrugh in 1710 for the 3rd Earl of Carlisle. The stone that makes up the well cover is finely cut, ashlar Magnesian Limestone. Three of its sides are made up of arched entrances with pendant keystones. Originally the well was built as a stepwell sourced from a spring alongside a park wall, with the spring lying at the base of some steps under the structure. The spring was buried in 1960 during the construction of the Doncaster By-Pass and the well was relocated away from its original location, being placed alongside the highway on a concrete foundation. After its relocation the structure was rehabilitated in 1993 with a stainless-steel frame to ensure its prolonged survival.

== History ==
The ballad "Robin Hood and the Curtal Friar" gives the figure of Robin Hood a connection to fountains, which may account for the original naming of the spring where the well was established. The well itself was given the name "Robin Hood's Well" by Charles Howard, 3rd Earl of Carlisle, who had the well named after the figure in an attempt to solidify the area's identity as the home of the legends.

The spring associated with the well was first recorded in 1622 by the antiquarian, Roger Dodsworth, and a little later in "Barnaby's Journal" by Richard Braithwaite. It was said to have restorative powers and was exploited as such by local hostelries. It is also mentioned in a contemporary play, "The Sad Shepherd: or a Tale of Robin Hood", by Ben Jonson.

When in its original location, according to letters by Roger Gale in John Nichols topographical book of Britain, recorded that there was an epigram in Latin that read:

"nympha fui quondam latronibus hospita sylvae. Heu nimium sociis nota, Robine, tuis. Me pudet innocuous latices fudisse scelestis, iamque viatore poculo tuta fero, en pietatis honos! Comes hanc nihi Carliolensis Aedam sacravit qua bibis, hospes, aquas."

and translates as:

"I was once a nymph, the host of robbers in the forest. Alas, too well known to your companions, Robin. I am ashamed to have spilled the innocuous laces of criminals, and now I will carry the traveler's cup safe, in the honors of piety! The count of Carlisle consecrated this house where you a guest eat, drink, and water."

The site next to the Great North Road was shown on the maps for the journey from London to in tourist guide, British High Roads (arranged for the use of tourists). And also featured on the maps in the book, "An actual survey of the Great Post Roads between London and Edinburgh", by the geographer Mostyn John Armstrong.

The stone structure known today as Robin Hood's Well was designed by Sir John Vanbrugh in 1710. It was erected to the east of the Great North Road. Barnsdale Forest had been associated with the legend of Robin Hood for centuries at the time of its construction, so Charles Howard, 3rd Earl of Carlisle had the well named after the figure in an attempt to solidify the area's identity as the home of the myths. The well house was moved from its original location during the construction of the Doncaster By-Pass in 1960. Hence it is no longer a real well, and now rests upon a solid concrete base. After its relocation it was listed as a Grade II building on 5 June 1968, affording it protections due to its historic value.

== Other Robin Hood Wells ==
There are a number of other wells named after the legendary figure. They are located at:

- Helmshore, near Bury
- St Ann, Nottingham
- Fountains Abbey, Ripon
- Stanbury Moor, West Yorkshire

== See also ==
- Little John's Well
- Listed buildings in Burghwallis
