= Thorpe Marsh Power Station =

Former coal-fired power station

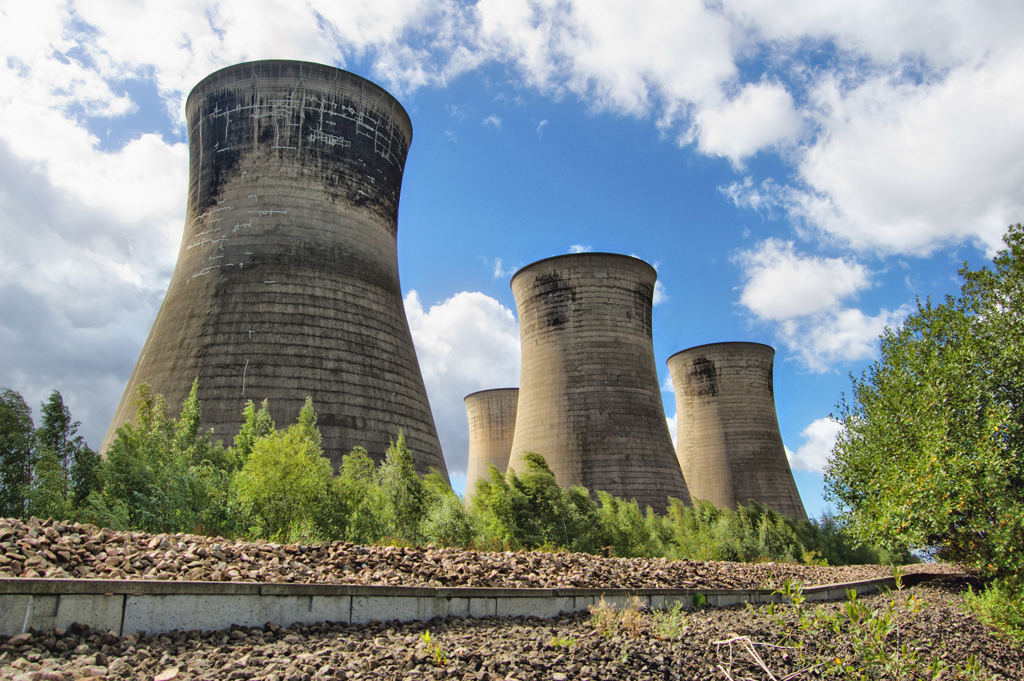
- Thorpe Marsh power station's cooling towers
- Country: England
- Location: South Yorkshire, Yorkshire and the Humber
- Coordinates: 53.580602°N 1.08534°W
- Construction began: 1959
- Commission date: 1963
- Decommission date: 1994
- Operators: Central Electricity Generating Board (1963-1990); National Power (1990-1994)

Thermal power station
- Primary fuel: Coal
- Tertiary fuel: Heavy Fuel Oil

Power generation
- Nameplate capacity: 1,100 MW

External links
- Commons: Related media on Commons

Thorpe Marsh Power Station was a 1 GW coal-fired power station near Barnby Dun in South Yorkshire, England. The station was commissioned in 1963 and closed in 1994. In 2011, permission was given for the construction of a gas-fired power station on the site.

== History ==
=== Construction and operation (1959–1994) ===
The Central Electricity Authority proposed in December 1956 to construct a power station containing 550 MW turbo alternators. These were vastly bigger units than had been built which at the time was 200 MW. The sets were actually 2 × 275 MW units powered by one turbine as that was the maximum size that could be transported. Thorpe Marsh was selected for a 1,100 MW station to be delivered as a part of its 1962 programme.

Construction of the station began in 1959; it was built as a prototype for all the large modern power stations in the UK. It was commissioned between 1963 and 1965. Thorpe Marsh was one of the CEGB's twenty steam power stations with the highest thermal efficiency; in 1963–4 the thermal efficiency was 31.50 per cent, 32.76 per cent in 1964–5, and 33.09 per cent in 1965–6.

There were 2 × 28 MW auxiliary gas turbines on the site, these had been commissioned in December 1966.

The plant was officially opened in 1967.

The station contained two Parsons 550 MW generating units. These turbo-generator itself is a two-shaft machine operating two alternators, each of 275 MW cross compound turbines, each supplied from a International Combustion boiler that could provide 3,750,000 lb/ of steam an hour, at a pressure of 2,400 lb per sq in and a temperature of 1,055 deg F. The steam was reheated after passing through the high-pressure turbine back to 1,055 deg F before passing back through the remaining stages of the turbine. These were the biggest boilers ever constructed at the time and were two separately cased twin furnace units but with a single steam output.

The annual electricity output of Thorpe Marsh was:

Electricity output of Thorpe Marsh
Year	1963–4	1964–5	1965–6	1966–7	1971–2	1978–9	1981–2
Electricity supplied, GWh	581	1,697	1,803	2,804	3,660	3,750	4,296

On 7 January 1973, four workmen died. A coroner's report gave a verdict of accidental death; subsequently the Factory Inspectorate began legal proceedings against the Central Electricity Generating Board (CEGB) for breaches in safety provisions.

After the privatisation of the CEGB in 1990, the station was operated by National Power. The station subsequently closed in 1994.

=== Post closure (1994–) ===
The 45 ha (110 acres) site was acquired by Able UK in 1995.

During the 2007 United Kingdom floods, the 400 kV substation at the site was temporarily shut down on 27 June, whilst the 275 kV substation was not affected; operational service was fully restored by early 28 June.

In October 2011, the Department of Energy and Climate Change approved the construction of a 1,500 MW combined cycle gas turbine power station at Thorpe Marsh by Thorpe Marsh Power Limited (parent Acorn Power Developments, see Acorn Energy) with an estimated cost of £984 million. Thorpe Marsh Power Limited proposed an initial capacity of 960 MW. The proposed development would also require the construction of an 18 km (11 mi) gas pipeline from Camblesforth; the gas pipeline was approved in 2016.

Able UK demolished the original power station's cooling towers in 2012.

In 2022 plans were unveiled to build a 1.4 GW / 3.1 GWh battery energy storage system on the site for £445 million by 2027, named the Thorpe Marsh Green Energy Hub. A 1 GW / 2 GWh battery is also planned at the adjacent Almholme site. Local news sources have highlighted the projects' potential in repurposing the old power station's infrastructure.
