= Burghwallis =

Village and civil parish in South Yorkshire, England

Coordinates: 53.60°N 1.18°W

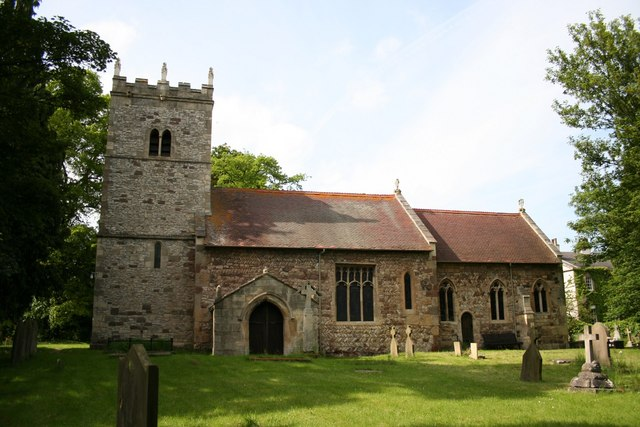
- St Helen's church, Burghwallis

- Location within South Yorkshire
- Population: 300 (2011)
- OS grid reference: SE541118
- Civil parish: Burghwallis
- Metropolitan borough: Doncaster
- Metropolitan county: South Yorkshire
- Region: Yorkshire and the Humber
- Country: England
- Sovereign state: United Kingdom
- Post town: DONCASTER
- Postcode district: DN6
- Dialling code: 01302
- Police: South Yorkshire
- Fire: South Yorkshire
- Ambulance: Yorkshire
- UK Parliament: Doncaster North

Burghwallis is a small village and civil parish in rural South Yorkshire, England. The population of the civil parish as of the 2011 census was 300. The village is situated amongst mixed farmland and woodland on a slight rise roughly six miles north north west of Doncaster, or one mile off the A1.

The village church is dedicated to St Helen. The village pub is the Burghwallis.

== History ==
In contrast with most of the villages surrounding Doncaster, very little in the way of residential development took place in Burghwallis during the 19th and 20th centuries. Today the village is one of a handful in the area to have retained much of its original character and has a very peaceful small-scale rural feel.

No church is mentioned in Burghwallis' entry in the Domesday Book; however, the Grade II Listed St Helen's chapel is likely to have been either standing or under construction at the time. Several architectural features suggest it is of a pre-Conquest design, and it is held to have been built between 950 and 1100 AD. Parish records as far back as 1596 exist and are available from the Doncaster archives. Priest-in-charge Revd Chris Herbert

The parish was the home of Catholic martyr John Anne, who lived in the Hall during the 16th century.

== Etymology ==
Burgh in general tends to mean town/township in Old Norse and Old German. The parish is referred to simply as "Burg" in the Domesday book, becoming Burghwallis in the early 13th century when Dionysia – one of seven surviving daughters of the local lord – was married into the Wallis family. The Wallis family line persisted among the local landowners through to the early 17th century by which time the name of the settlement was so far removed from that of the local aristocracy that the succeeding Anne family appear not to have thought to change it. The name literally means "village of the Wallis family".

== The music box ghost ==
Burghwallis Hall, also known as St Anne's Convent, is reputed to have a ghost. On 14 March 1934 a mother smothered her son while he slept, then concealed the body in a closet. Her husband discovered the body, then murdered his wife and took his own life. A music box is reputed to have been heard through the corridors along with the voice of a small boy. The ghost of the man in grey and a small woman are also claimed to be seen walking the corridors.

== Notable residents ==
- Jeremy Clarkson spent his childhood on the nearby Home Farm.

== See also ==
- Listed buildings in Burghwallis
- Robin Hood's Well
