= Bentley, South Yorkshire =

Suburb of Doncaster in South Yorkshire, England

Coordinates: 53.551°N 1.144°W

Bentley
- Suburb
- Bentley High Street, 2026

- Location within the City of Doncaster Location within South Yorkshire
- Population: 12,048 (2021, built-up area subdivision)
- OS grid reference: SE565056
- Metropolitan county: South Yorkshire
- Region: Yorkshire and the Humber
- Country: England
- Sovereign state: United Kingdom
- Post town: Doncaster
- Postcode district: DN5
- Dialling code: 01302
- Police: South Yorkshire
- Fire: South Yorkshire
- Ambulance: Yorkshire

Bentley is a suburb of Doncaster in South Yorkshire, England two miles north of the city centre. The population of the ward (also including Arksey, Shaftholme, Toll Bar and part of Scawthorpe) within the City of Doncaster at the 2021 census was 18,195. The Bentley built-up area subdivision had a population of 12,048.

Historically within the West Riding of Yorkshire, the village was once owned by Edmund Hastings of Plumtree, Nottinghamshire, who had inherited it from his wife Copley's Sprotborough family. Hastings subsequently sold the manor to John Levett, a York lawyer born at High Melton who married the niece of Hastings's wife, who then conveyed it to Sir Arthur Ingram of York, High Sheriff of Yorkshire.

A former mining village, it lies on the River Don. Bentley Colliery, which is now Bentley Community Woodland, closed in December 1993. Bentley and the nearby hamlet of Toll Bar were badly affected by floods in June 2007.

The local parish church of St. Peter dates back to 1891. A second church, Church of SS Philip and James in the New Village area was dedicated in 1915

Bentley includes West End, New Village and Rostholme. Streets in Bentley include Cooke Street and High Street.

During the 2019 United Kingdom floods residents of Bentley were asked to leave their homes after the area suffered flooding.

== See also ==
- Listed buildings in Doncaster (Bentley Ward)
- Bentley (South Yorkshire) railway station
