= Almholme =

Hamlet in South Yorkshire, England

Coordinates: 53.567°N 01.112°W

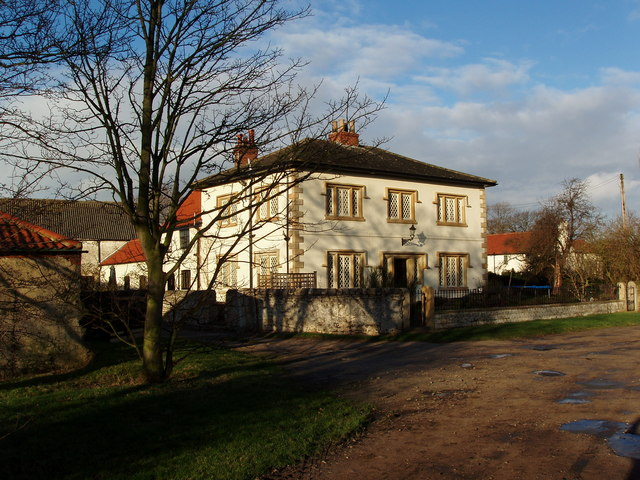
- Farmhouse at Low Farm

- Location within South Yorkshire
- OS grid reference: SE5808
- Metropolitan borough: Doncaster
- Metropolitan county: South Yorkshire
- Region: Yorkshire and the Humber
- Country: England
- Sovereign state: United Kingdom
- Post town: DONCASTER
- Postcode district: DN5
- Dialling code: 01302
- Police: South Yorkshire
- Fire: South Yorkshire
- Ambulance: Yorkshire

Almholme is a hamlet in South Yorkshire, England. It was in the parish of Arksey, and is now in Bentley with Arksey unparished area.

The term 'holme' relates to the hamlet being located in a low and level pasture near water; the River Don is to the east and to the north is Thorpe Marsh Nature Reserve.

== See also ==
- Listed buildings in Doncaster (Bentley Ward)
