= Skelbrooke =

Village in South Yorkshire, England

Coordinates: 53.602°N 1.231°W

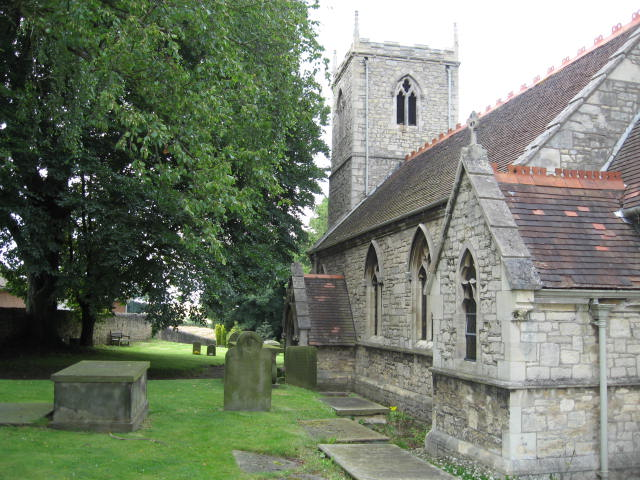
- Church of St Michael and All Angels and cemetery

- Location within South Yorkshire
- OS grid reference: SE5112
- Civil parish: Hampole
- Metropolitan borough: Doncaster
- Metropolitan county: South Yorkshire
- Region: Yorkshire and the Humber
- Country: England
- Sovereign state: United Kingdom
- Post town: Doncaster
- Postcode district: DN6
- Dialling code: 01302
- Police: South Yorkshire
- Fire: South Yorkshire
- Ambulance: Yorkshire
- UK Parliament: Doncaster North

Skelbrooke is a village and former civil parish, now in the parish of Hampole, in the Doncaster district, in the county of South Yorkshire, England. In 1931 the civil parish had a population of 119.

The Grade II listed church of St Michael and All Angels is of medieval origin, but was rebuilt in 1872 following fire damage. There are also two Grade II listed medieval grave slabs near the church, and Skelbrooke Hall with its gate piers as well as a house that once formed part of an 18th-century stable block are likewise listed buildings.

== History ==
The name Skelbrooke derives from the Old Scandinavian skáli meaning 'shieling', and the Old English brōc, meaning 'brook'.

Skelbrooke was formerly a chapelry in South Kirkby parish, from 1866 Skelbrooke was a civil parish in its own right, on 1 April 1938 the parish was abolished and merged with Hampole.

== See also ==
- Listed buildings in Hampole
