= Roundwood Colliery =

Former coal mine in South Yorkshire, England

Coordinates: 53°27′21″N 1°19′29″W

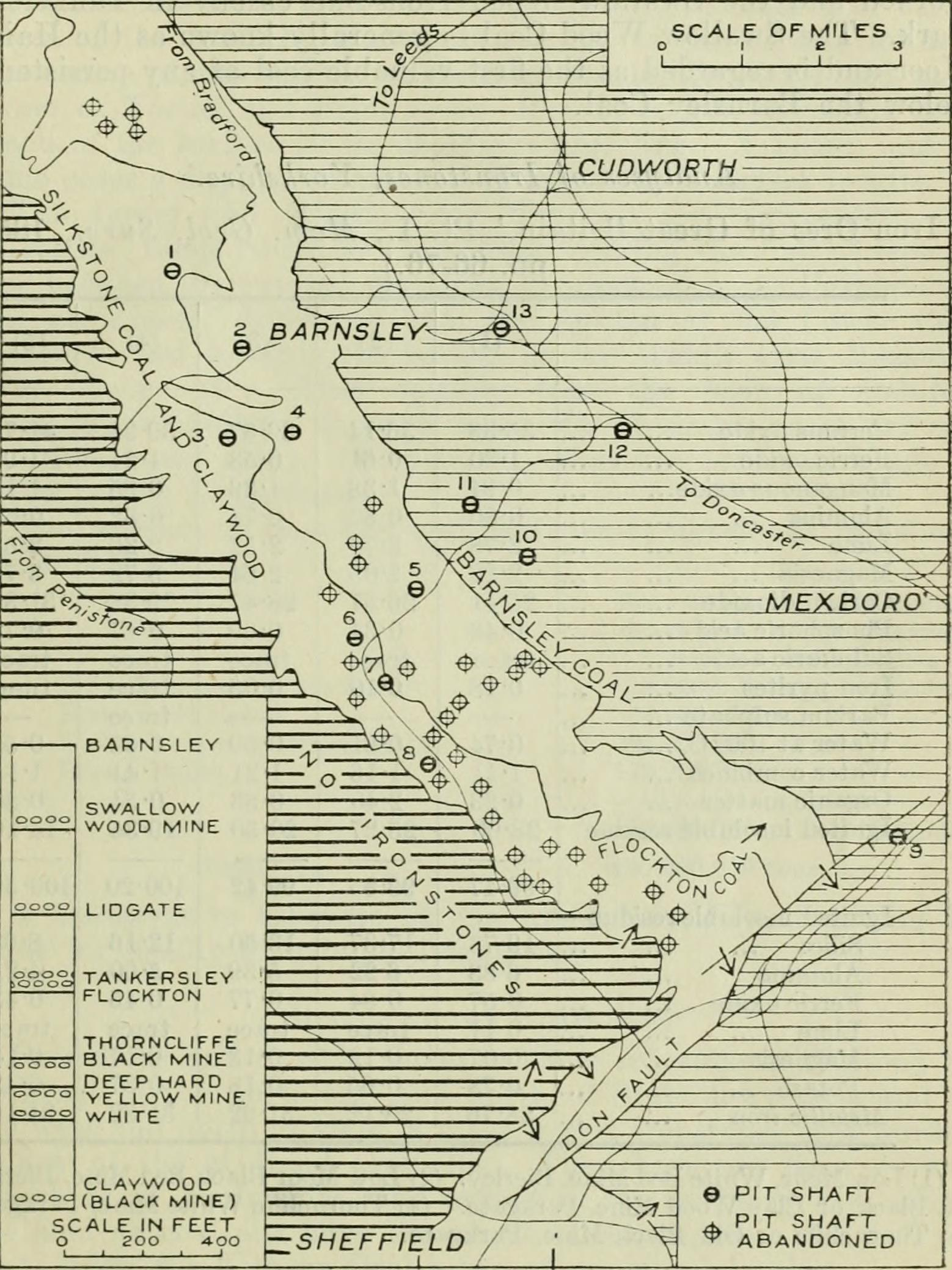
1915 map of coal mines in South Yorkshire. Roundwood colliery is No. 9 in the east.

Roundwood Colliery was a coal mine situated in the Don Valley, about 2 miles (3.2 km) north of Rotherham, South Yorkshire, England on the borders of Rotherham and Rawmarsh.

== History ==
Coal gathering in the Aldwarke area, lands of the old manor which stretch across the Don Valley from Parkgate to Thrybergh, goes back to the 17th century with documents relating to tenants' rights of way over the grounds and the river Dunne (Don) at Aldwarke ford, on both sides of river; and to any person fetching coals from pits. Earlier records still refer to charkcole (charcoal) to be cut in Rounde woodde near Aldwarke Manor house. It is from Rounde woodde that this colliery takes its name.

== Deep Mining ==
The Deep Mine, named Roundwood, was set a short distance north of Aldwarke Main Colliery between the main line of the Midland Railway, north of Parkgate and Rawmarsh and the Mexborough to Sheffield line of the Manchester, Sheffield and Lincolnshire Railway, north of Parkgate and Aldwarke. It was established in the early 1860s and had connections to both railways and to staithes alongside the River Don.

In 1880 the colliery was listed as being owned by Cooper, Sellars and Company, becoming The Roundwood Colliery Company by 1896. This company was purchased by John Brown and Company becoming the Dalton Main Colliery Company in 1899, and who undertook the sinking of Silverwood Colliery. These collieries being joined by a railway built by the owners and known as John Brown's Private Railway and over which a Paddy Mail service operated until the 1930s when it was discontinued in favour of "pit buses" which were operated by private companies and, later Rotherham Corporation. From 1908 the collieries were joined underground. This underground joining of the collieries meant that the drawing of coal could be concentrated at Silverwood and the Roundwood shafts used for materials and men.

In 1947 the colliery passed to the National Coal Board and was closed in the early 1960s.
