= Thrybergh Junction =

Railway junction in South Yorkshire, England

Coordinates: 53.462°N 1.307°W

Thrybergh Junction was a junction on the South Yorkshire Railway, Mexborough to Rotherham line situated about 1 mile south of Kilnhurst Central. The junction was originally controlled by a Manchester, Sheffield and Lincolnshire Railway signal box of the earliest design, almost square with a hipped roof built on stilts. The junction was originally known as Thrybergh Hall Junction and served the line to Kilnhurst Colliery, brickworks and another colliery interest at Warren Vale.

On the sinking of Silverwood Colliery this became the junction for the Silverwood Branch, a short curve which joined the Great Central to John Brown's Private Railway, a line which linked the colliery to a riverside boat staithe and John Browns other colliery interests in the Parkgate area.

The M.S.& L.R. signal box was always in a difficult position being built into the bank of the nearby River Don. The box, around 1920, eventually fell backwards into the river and a replacement was sought. This was found in an almost new cabin, from York Road, Doncaster, which was moved and erected on the site.

By 1988, the junction still gave access to the colliery at Silverwood, and by 2020, the junction was still listed under railway mapping, but only controlling a dual line going into a single line heading towards Rotherham, some 3 miles (5 km) south.
