= Earl Fitzwilliam's private railway =

Former railway near Rotherham, South Yorkshire, England

Earl Fitzwilliam's private railway near Rotherham, South Yorkshire, was constructed in order to link the Earl's coal interests to the southeast of his Wentworth estate with the Greasbrough Canal, also owned by his estate, which gave an outlet to the River Dun (Don) Navigation.

The Marquess of Rockingham held the coal pits at the same time; this was not their first attempt to connect them to the canal; in the middle years of the 18th century, a wagonway had been constructed to connect the Bassingthorpe pits to the newly opened "Rotherham Cut" of the River Dun Navigation. The Greasbrough Canal, connecting to the navigation on the boundaries of Rotherham and Parkgate, was opened in 1780 to serve the Marquess's interests, and the wagonways from his coal pits at Bassingthorpe were diverted to the canal head. Two years later, the Marquess died, and the estate passed to his nephew, Earl Fitzwilliam.

In the early 19th century, a wagonway connected the Earl's coal pits at High Stubbin and Swallow Wood to the Greasbrough Canal. In 1839, the Sheffield and Rotherham Railway opened a branch from its main line at Holmes, which had been opened the previous year, to join the Earl's railway at Parkgate. This line ran alongside the construction works of the North Midland Railway before joining the canal bank. This connection broke the near monopoly of the Duke of Norfolk's estate in supplying coal to the developing industries of the city and gave the Earl's coal a competitive edge in the marketplace.

In 1840, the estate bought a six-coupled steam locomotive for use on the line, and to accommodate this, the wagonway was rebuilt.

A connection was made from the North Midland Railway to the Earl's line, which rendered the branch from Holmes redundant. This connection was closed in 1977, a year before New Stubbin Colliery itself. The Manchester, Sheffield and Lincolnshire Railway constructed a line from Rotherham Road alongside the canal and below the North Midland line to reach the canal head. The line opened in 1873, and the agreement between the Earl's Colliery Company and the M.S.& L. terminated on 31 December 1978 when the line closed.

In 1915, Viscount Halifax invested heavily in the improvement of the rail line.

The line can be divided into two sections, both originally rope-worked. The lower section serving New Stubbin Colliery, sunk between 1913 and 1915, changed to locomotive working.

Its last steam locomotives were two examples built by Hudswell Clarke & Co. of Leeds: No. 34, an outside cylinder, six-coupled side tank locomotive, works No.1523, built in 1925 and delivered new to the Appleby-Frodingham Steel Company in Scunthorpe, which came to the line in the 1950s; and No. 37, an outside cylinder, six-coupled saddle tank. They worked until the mid-1960s, when the line became fully dieselised, with Hudswell Clarke again supplying the power.

== See also ==
- Elsecar Heritage Railway
