= New Stubbin Colliery =

Former coal mine in South Yorkshire, England

Coordinates: 53°27′51″N 1°21′30″W

New Stubbin Colliery was a coal mine situated in the township of Rawmarsh near Rotherham, South Yorkshire, England. The colliery was situated in a deep valley. Along one side at the top of the valley runs Haugh Road, Rawmarsh and on the other a lane known locally as "Greasbrough Tops".

The first sod of the new colliery development was cut by Viscount Milton, son of Earl Fitzwilliam, on 14 November 1913 and it took until 1915 to complete the sinking. The pit was situated on the Wentworth Estates of Earl Fitzwilliam and was owned, until nationalization by Earl Fitzwilliam's Collieries Co. Ltd. It was sunk to reach the Parkgate seam and replace the nearby Old Stubbin pit which also worked the Barnsley seam. Following nationalization the colliery came under the control of the National Coal Board.

The colliery was connected to the national rail system by a single track railway, which pre-dated the colliery being built to serve earlier workings, and which ran down the Stubbin Incline to the Greasbrough Canal, a landsale site and a connection to the Great Central Railway at Rotherham Road and the Midland Railway between Rotherham Masborough and Parkgate. In Parkgate, adjacent to the canal were coke ovens belonging to South Yorkshire Coke and Chemical Company and which supplied coke to Park Gate Iron and Steel Company 's blast furnace plant.

The colliery ceased production on 6 July 1978, however remained as an underground store until the mid-1980s.
