= Park Gate Iron and Steel Company =

- Industry: iron and steel smelting, casting and rolling
- Founded: Parkgate, West Riding of Yorkshire, England, 1823
- Founder: Samuel Sanderson, Mr Watson
- Fate: taken over
- Successor: Iron and Steel Corporation of Great Britain 1951; Tube Investments 1956
- Headquarters: South Yorkshire, UK
- Products: rolled steel and semi-finished casting products

The Park Gate Iron and Steel Company was a British company that smelted iron ore and turned it into rolled steel and semi-finished casting products. Its works was at Parkgate, South Yorkshire on a triangular site bounded on two sides by the main road between Rotherham and Barnsley (A633) and the North Midland Railway main line between Rotherham Masborough and Cudworth. It also operated ironstone quarries in Northamptonshire and Leicestershire.

== Early history ==
Records from 1823 show the establishment of a Parkgate Ironworks by Samuel Sanderson and a Mr Watson. This was at the junction of Rotherham Road and Taylors Lane with part of the works facing the Greasbrough Canal. The company was sold in 1832 and became the Birmingham Tin Plate Company. Over the years, along with the business changing hands several times, the works expanded across Rotherham Road to the Park Gate site, which continued until the 1970s. The first blast furnace was installed in 1839 and, after another change in ownership, a mill for the rolling of railway rails was installed in 1845.

In 1854 Samuel Beale and Company made the cast iron armour plating for Isambard Kingdom Brunel's ocean liner Great Eastern. Samuel Beale retired in 1864 and his son incorporated the company under the name Parkgate Iron Company Limited.

Two more blast furnaces were brought into operation in 1871. Further new plant was added over the next decade, including a slab mill, a large plate mill, a billet mill and three open hearth furnaces. In 1888 the company was renamed the Parkgate Iron & Steel Company Limited to reflect its increase in steelmaking.

By 1908 the works had converted entirely to steel production and until 1946 its main products were steel ingots for further processing, in particular steel plate and armour plate for shipbuilding and solid bar products ranging from 3/8-inch (9.5 mm) to 9 1/2-inch (240 mm). The company also made sectional shapes and in particular arches and props for mining.

In 1914 the company opened new head offices on Broad Street, Rotherham by James Knight.

== Iron and steel making plant ==
After the First World War the company bought land at nearby Roundwood, and by 1920 a tenth open hearth furnace was added and new rolling capacity on 10-inch (250 mm), 12-inch (300 mm) and 18-inch (460 mm) rolling mills began production.

In 1946 steel plate rolling ended. In 1953 the 11-inch (280 mm) continuous bar mill was completed, which was to roll both straight and coiled bar. In 1963 the new site covered some 370 acres (150 ha) and the Roundwood site, beside the Midland Main Line north of the main works, and covering another 220 acres (89 ha) was starting production. The plant then included two mechanically-charged blast furnaces feeding 10 open hearth steel making furnaces which, in turn, fed two primary mills for rolling blooms and billets and six finishing mills rolling a wide range of blooms, billets, slabs, sections, bars and strip. The Roundwood site had an 11" continuous bar mill and a narrow hot strip mill. Capacity at the time was about 425,000 tons of carbon, low alloy, and free-cutting steel and ingots.

In 1951 the 1945–51 Labour Government nationalised most large British iron and steel companies under the Iron & Steel Act 1949. The Parkgate company became part of the resulting Iron and Steel Corporation of Great Britain. After the 1951 General Elections the 1951–57 Conservative Government privatised most of the corporation, and in 1956 Parkgate was sold to Tube Investments. Major development work was planned for a site at Aldwarke, to begin production in the 1960s. This included Kaldo process basic oxygen steelmaking plant which was fed from the blast furnaces at Parkgate, ladles being moved by rail between the sites. This development also included hot rolling facilities. By the 1970s demand had changed and part of the old plant was demolished, the remainder of the Parkgate site was closed in 1985 with the closure of the heat treatment department. In 1976 rolling capacity was increased with the coming on stream of the Thrybergh Bar Mill.

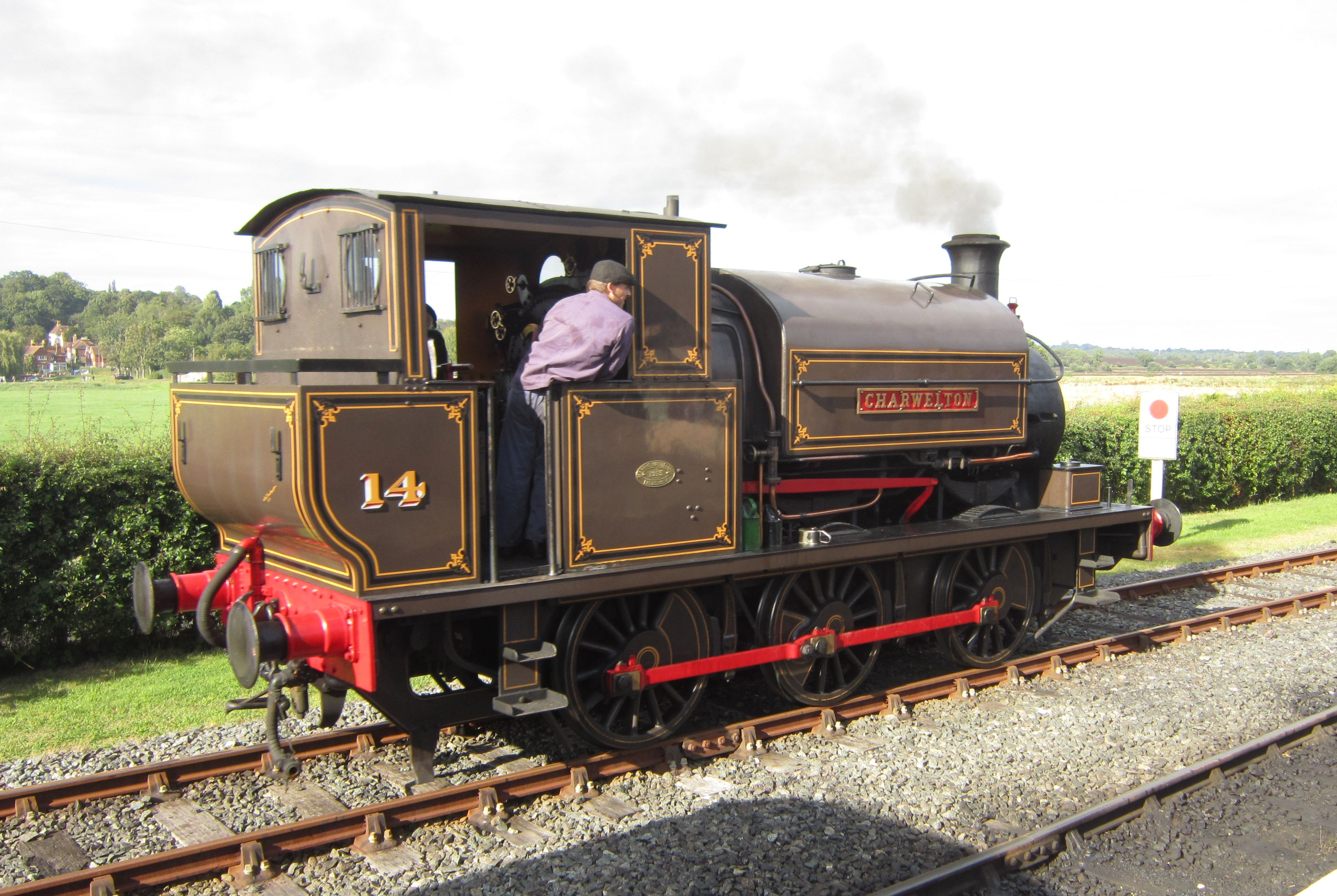
1917 steam locomotive Charwelton worked Parkgate's quarry railways, originally between Hellidon and Charwelton and later at Sproxton. It is now preserved on the Kent and East Sussex Railway.

== Rail links ==
All the sites had rail links. The original site also had access to the Greasborough canal. The Manchester, Sheffield and Lincolnshire Railway (MS&LR) opened its 0.5 miles (800 m) Park Gate branch to serve the works in August 1873. The branch left the main line about 0.5 miles (800 m) south of Parkgate and Aldwarke and passed below the Midland line. Iron ore arrived here from the company's quarries south of Hellidon, Northamptonshire and east of Sproxton, Leicestershire. The company also held shares in iron ore mines at Appleby near Scunthorpe. The Midland Railway had links next to Parkgate and Rawmarsh station that served sidings next to the blast furnace plant, ore arriving here from the quarry in Northamptonshire.

When Parkgate opened its quarry at Hellidon in 1917 it had a 1.5-mile (2 km) mineral railway built to link it with the Great Central Main Line at Charwelton. Parkgate's Sproxton quarry had a 6-mile (10 km) mineral railway to link it with the East Coast Main Line south of Great Ponton. A 1917 Manning Wardle steam locomotive that worked first the Hellidon line and later the Sproxton line is preserved on the Kent and East Sussex Railway.

Links to the present site are maintained either through the New Yard, adjacent to the MS&LR line near Parkgate and Aldwarke station, or directly into the 11" mill from the Midland line at Aldwarke Junction. The works has had an internal rail system from its early days and this now takes traffic from the New Yard throughout the site. In the late 1950s the system was dieselised with 10 four-coupled locomotives built by Brush Engineering of Loughborough. In the mid-1960s these were joined by six Brush six-coupled locomotives. The network has been cut back over the years but there is enough work to warrant its retention. The Parkgate fleet was joined by some locomotives from the Rotherham Works of Steel, Peech and Tozer when the latter was closed, including examples built by the Yorkshire Engine Company of Sheffield.
