= Aldwarke Main Colliery =

Abandoned English coal mine

Coordinates: 53°27′2″N 1°20′0″W

Aldwarke Main Colliery was a coal mine sunk in the Don Valley, near Rotherham, South Yorkshire, England.

== History ==
The name "Aldwarke" refers to an area in the Don Valley about 2 miles north of Rotherham, South Yorkshire stretching to the outskirts of the village of Kilnhurst. To its west is Parkgate, to its east the villages of Dalton and Thrybergh. The washlands of the River Don (known locally as "The Wash") was crossed by a toll road which was freed of toll in the late 1980s.

Coal gathering at Aldwarke goes back to the 17th century with documents relating to tenants rights of way over the grounds and the River Dunne (Don) at Aldwarke ford, on both sides of river; And to any person fetching coals from pits. Earlier records still refer to charcoal (charcoal) to be cut in Rounde woodde near Aldwarke Manor house.

== Deep mining ==
The colliery was sunk on a triangular section of land, to its west the main line of the Midland Railway, to the east the Mexborough to Sheffield line of the Manchester, Sheffield and Lincolnshire Railway and to its south the road, known as Aldwarke Lane, a toll road across the lands of the manor of Aldwarke linking Parkgate to Dalton, near Rotherham. The colliery was linked to both adjacent railway lines and to a staithe on the River Don Navigation.

The mine was sunk in three stages, the first shaft reached the productive Barnsley seam (bed) in 1867. It took a further 10 years, by deepening the same shaft to reach the Parkgate bed but it was not until 1884, with the sinking of a second shaft, that the Silkstone seam was reached. The colliery continued taking production from these seams until the Second World War when, between 1944 and 1946, the shafts were deepened to reach the Swallow Wood seam and give better access to the Parkgate seam.

Ownership was in the hands of Sheffield steelmakers John Brown and Co. Ltd. and passed to the National Coal Board on nationalisation in 1947.

== Closure ==
The colliery was closed on 30 June 1961.
