= Rawmarsh =

Village in South Yorkshire, England

Coordinates: 53°27′49″N 1°20′38″W

- Village
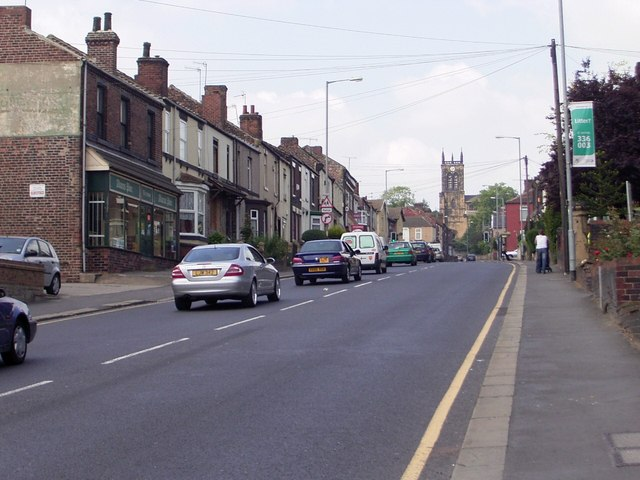
- Rawmarsh hill

- Location within South Yorkshire
- Population: 18,498
- OS grid reference: SK435965
  - London: 145 mi (233 km) SSE
- Metropolitan borough: Rotherham
- Metropolitan county: South Yorkshire
- Region: Yorkshire and the Humber
- Country: England
- Sovereign state: United Kingdom
- Post town: ROTHERHAM
- Postcode district: S62
- Dialling code: 01709
- Police: South Yorkshire
- Fire: South Yorkshire
- Ambulance: Yorkshire
- UK Parliament: Rawmarsh and Conisbrough

Rawmarsh (locally /ˈroʊmɪʃ/) is a village in the Metropolitan Borough of Rotherham, in South Yorkshire, England. Historically within the West Riding of Yorkshire, it is 2 miles (3 km) north-northeast from Rotherham town centre and 3 miles (5 km) south-southwest of Swinton. The village also forms part of the Sheffield Urban Area. The Rawmarsh ward of Rotherham MBC had a population of 13,389 at the 2011 Census. Rawmarsh also contains other output areas from neighbouring wards giving it a population of 18,498 in 2011 and 18,535 in 2014.

== History ==
=== Etymology ===
The name has gone through many changes since being recorded as "Rodemesc" in the Domesday Book and "Raumersche" in 1355. The name is of dual origin, "Rode" is from the Old Norse for "red", while the second element is from Old English mersc "Marsh". This led to "Red Marsh", from its situation in the Permian System of red sandstones and marls which run through the area. Localised clays outcrop and the area was formerly known for its potteries.

=== Origins and development ===
At the beginning of the 20th century Rawmarsh was described as "an increasing parish" and included the outlying hamlets of Parkgate, Stubbin and Upper Haugh. In 1851 the population was 2,533 but 50 years later this had increased to 14,587. In 1961, the population was 19,700 but, forty years later, at the 2001 census it had reduced to 17,443. Rawmarsh has laid claim to the title of being the largest village in England; however this claim is unsubstantiated and there are indeed many settlements that make this claim.

St Mary's Church, Rawmarsh

Primarily a residential area, Rawmarsh is known for its church, Rawmarsh St Mary's Parish Church, which dominates the view at the top of Rawmarsh Hill. There has been a church in the town since Norman times (c.1127) but the earliest recorded rector was William de Sutton who was instituted on 6 June 1227. The current church was completed in 1838 when the tower was increased in height and the rest rebuilt, James Pigott Pritchett being the architect. In 1869, the tower began to collapse and was rebuilt incorporating features of the original Norman doorway. In 1894 the sanctuary was enlarged and the vestry, organ chamber and north porch were added. The present sanctuary was repaved in 1977 in memory of Canon Scovell, who is also remembered as a street name in the town; the font is Perpendicular in style and is from the old church. More recently restoration work was undertaken in 2003. The church contains two monuments of interest: one to Lady Middleton and her children (1667) who lived for a time at Aldwarke Hall, and the other to John Darley of Kilnhurst (1616). The Parish Church of Christ Church, Parkgate, separated from Rawmarsh in 1868, was brought back in the early 1960s. There are other churches: St Nicolas, Ryecroft (1928) and a selection of 'Free' churches, Spiritualists, Roman Catholic and Quakers.

== Industry ==
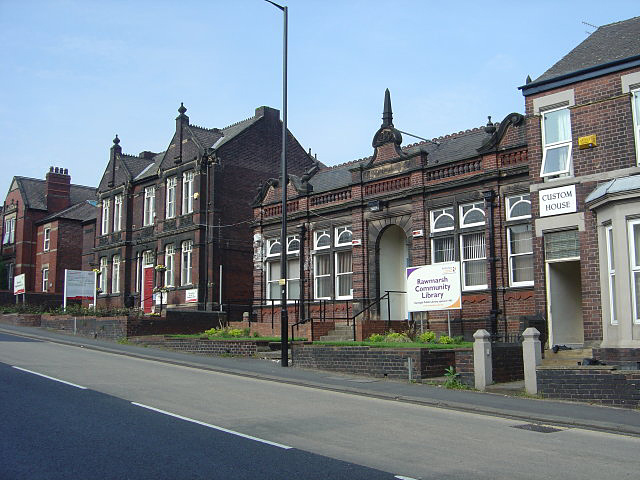
Former library

In the past the coal and steel industries were major employers in the area. Coal had been mined in the Haugh area from the mid-15th century and in the Parkgate area of the village since around 1700, mostly from small pits under the ownership of Earl Fitzwilliam. Deeper mining came in the mid-19th century, the town becoming ringed with collieries, Warren House and Warren Vale to the north, Stubbin, later followed by New Stubbin together with its railway, the Stubbin incline, linking it to the Greasbrough Canal taking up the western side and near the River Don in Parkgate, adjacent to each other and the two mainline railways serving the town Aldwarke Main and Roundwood. The last three collieries mentioned being the last of these to close; the last, New Stubbin, closing in 1978.

To the south of Rawmarsh is Parkgate, a suburb which had streets of terraced houses for the local workforce and which was dominated by the Park Gate Iron and Steel Company's works. This complex of two large blast furnaces and Siemens open hearth furnaces and ancillaries was closed in the late 1970s the land remained derelict until it was redeveloped as several large retail complexes in the late 1980s. Steel making is now concentrated at Aldwarke (New Site) which, when built in the early 1960s had Kaldo converters to take advantage of a supply of 'blast furnace metal' but now has electric melting capacity, the furnaces being transferred from Templeborough Works, Rotherham to provide the steel. Roundwood, the 11" mill as it is known because of the maximum rolling size, also remains open, both plants with a reduced workforce.

In the 18th century pottery was also made in the town; there are several references in places and street names within the area: Claypit Lane is an example.

== Transport ==
Rawmarsh, and neighbour Parkgate were formerly served by two railway stations, both some distance from the village centre. Parkgate and Aldwarke, on the former Great Central Railway line between Sheffield and Doncaster was the furthest away, being situated off Aldwarke Lane and was the first to close, in October 1951. The station on the Midland Railway line between Sheffield and Leeds was called Parkgate and Rawmarsh and closed in January 1968. The nearest rail station now is Swinton railway station.

Road transport services were provided, from 1907 when trams were introduced, by the Mexborough and Swinton Traction Company. In 1929 trolleybuses took over, the major routes being from Rotherham, through Rawmarsh to Mexborough (Route A to Adwick Road), Conisbrough (Route B to Brook Square) with three routes terminating in the township; Rawmarsh via Green Lane (Route S) which made an end-on connection and had a turning circle at the junction of Kilnhurst Road and Main Street with the route to Kilnhurst Road (Route K). There was also a short route used at busy periods to Parkgate (Route P). Motor buses were introduced with the building of the Monkwood estate in the late 1950s and to Kilnhurst via the N.C.B. estate at Sandhill. The last trolleybus ran in March 1961. Routes have been rationalised, the company fully integrated into the Yorkshire Traction and in 2005 into the Stagecoach Group. Rawmarsh is now served by Parkgate Tram-Train stop, offering regular services into Sheffield.

The local area is serviced by a local shopping centre, five churches and nine schools – notably Rawmarsh Community School which was featured in national news after a very small number of parents rebelled against the school's Jamie Oliver-style lunches.

== See also ==
- Listed buildings in Rawmarsh
