= Kilnhurst Colliery =

Former coal mine in South Yorkshire, England

Coordinates: 53°28′1″N 1°18′18″W

Kilnhurst Colliery, formerly known as either Thrybergh or Thrybergh Hall Colliery, was situated on the southern side of the village of Kilnhurst, near Rotherham, South Yorkshire, England.

The earliest colliery on the site, known as Thrybergh or Thrybergh Hall Colliery, worked the Barnsley seam from 1858, and was the site of a serious accident in 1863. The brickworks, along with the local pottery, was served by a branch of the South Yorkshire Railway from 1850, this becoming a through line linking Sheffield and Doncaster from 1864. From its sinking this line also served the colliery. The railway junction from the main line was known as Thrybergh Colliery Junction until the early days of the 20th century when the line to Thrybergh (Silverwood Colliery) was opened and the old signal box replaced.

The colliery was connected underground with two other mining operations, Warren Vale Colliery and Warren House Colliery. A standard gauge railway line connected Kilnhurst Colliery to Warren Vale, a continuance of the line which served Kilnhurst brickworks.

Through its lifetime the colliery had three owners. First came Wakefield-based J. & J. Charlesworth who developed the workings with the opening of the Swallow Wood seam in 1917 and prepared the way for extraction from the Parkgate seam which came on stream in 1923, the year when Charlesworth's were succeeded by Glasgow-based steel and coal company Stewarts & Lloyds Ltd. Under their ownership, in 1929, the Silkstone seam was opened up. Sheffield steelmakers and Clyde shipbuilders John Brown & Company was a sub-lessee of Stewart and Lloyds and this continued following the sale to the Tinsley Park Colliery Company on 28 April 1936. The colliery was sold, included the adjoining brickworks and a house, for the sum of £310,000. The sinking of a new, No.4 shaft was undertaken between 1937 and 1939.

Following the Second World War, in 1945, the colliery was in the ownership of the Manvers Main Colliery Company, based in Wath-upon-Dearne. From nationalisation the colliery came under the ownership of the National Coal Board.

With a rationalisation of outlets in the South Yorkshire coalfield Kilnhurst was merged into the South Manvers complex. The work, which took place between 1950 and 1956, saw the end of coal winding at Kilnhurst, all coal being transported underground to Manvers where it was drawn to the surface. The colliery closed in 1989.

In the 1980s the lads used to sing and play mouth organs on the paddy mail. The songs were all made up about the characters who worked down the pit.
