= Aldwarke Junction =

Railway junction in South Yorkshire, England

Coordinates: 53.4544°N 1.3272°W

Aldwarke Junction at Parkgate near Rotherham, South Yorkshire, England is a major railway junction. It was constructed in 1965 as a part of the Sheffield district rail rationalisation plan.

== Location ==
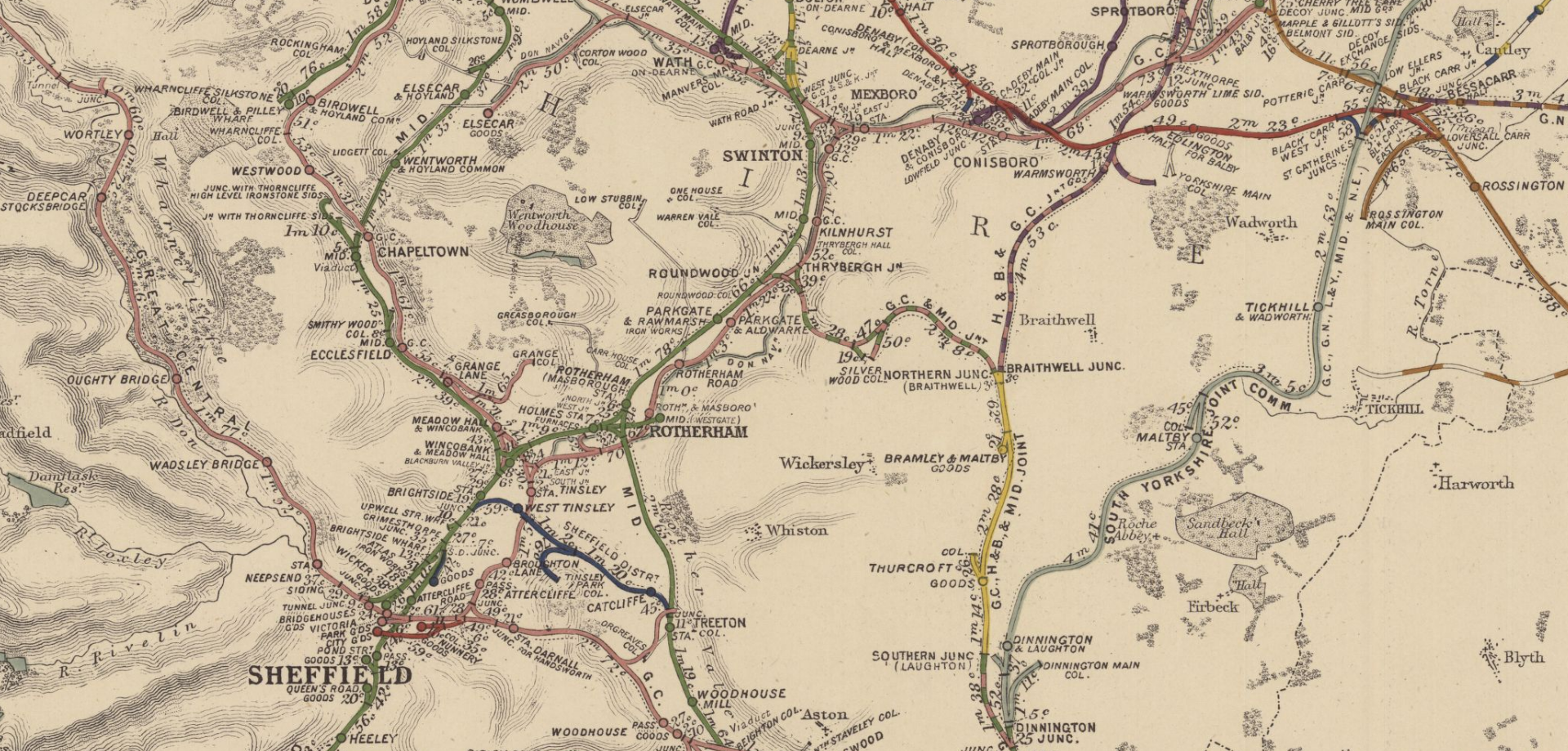
1918 Railway Clearing House map showing the parallel Great Central (pink) and Midland (green) railway lines between Sheffield and Swinton

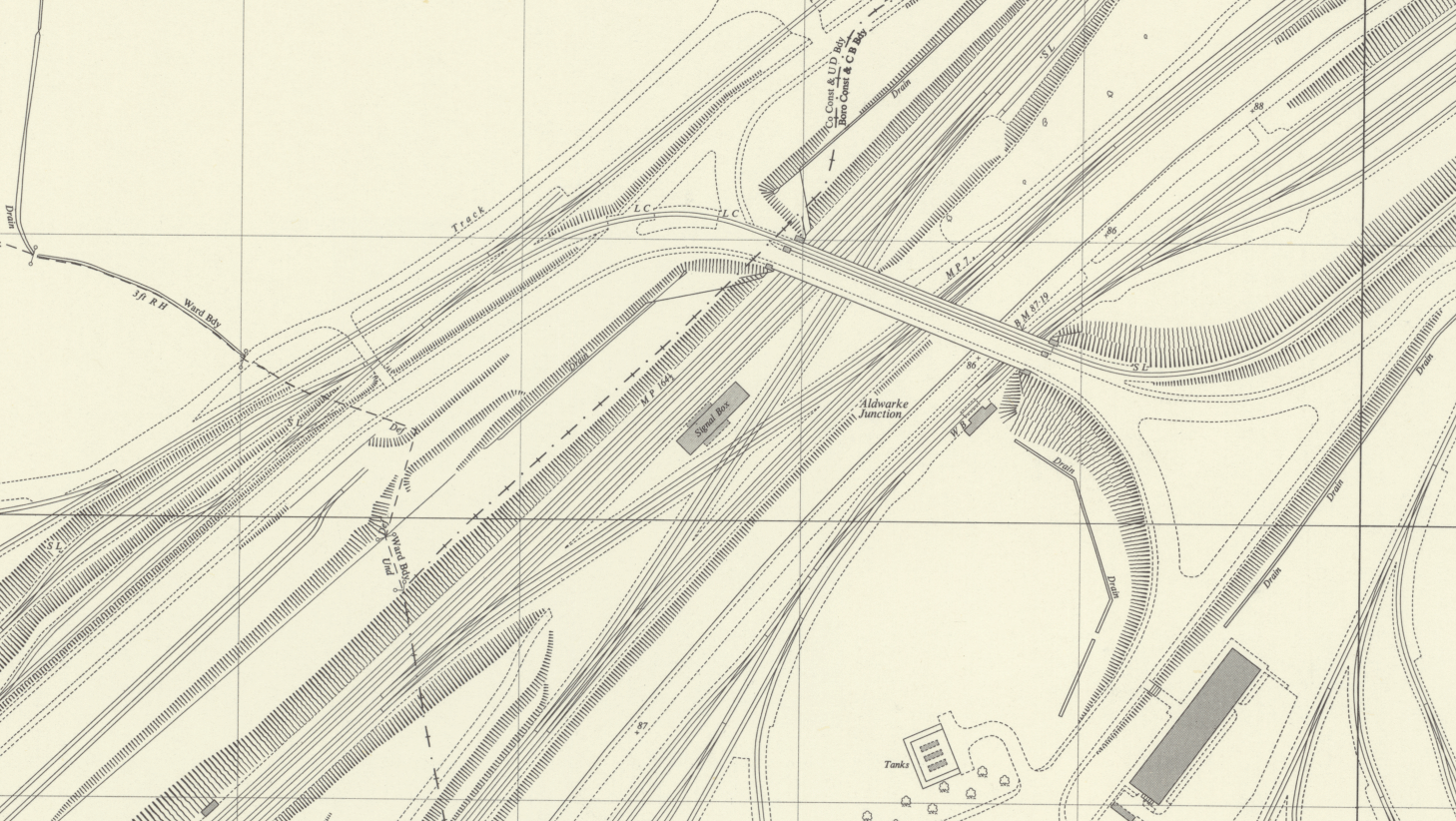
Aldwarke scissor crossing shown on an O.S. 1:2500 map circa 1970 (from full map available via NLS).

The junction is northeast of the site of the former Parkgate and Rawmarsh station, which closed in 1968.

At this point the double track former Great Central Railway line from Sheffield Victoria to Mexborough (where it joined the South Yorkshire line to Doncaster) came within 50 yards of the four-track former North Midland Railway line from Derby to Leeds. The junction built in 1965 was a double track cross-over (scissors crossing) taking traffic to and from the GC lines to the two "slow" lines of the North Midland in the direction of Leeds and to and from the "slow" lines of the North Midland to the GC, in the direction of Mexborough. Further ‘ladder’ cross-overs were installed in 1973 to make possible a move from the "slow" to the "fast" lines (and vice versa) on the North Midland at each end of the junction.

This gave access and egress via the GC to the northern end of the newly built Tinsley Marshalling Yard at Sheffield and to its southern end via a connection from the North Midland line at Treeton, south of Rotherham.

Operation of the junction and the immediate vicinity through new multiple aspect colour light signalling, four aspect on the Midland "fast" lines and three aspect on the Midland "slow" and G.C. lines, was installed controlled from a new power-operated signal box set just to the north of the scissors crossing. The signal box closed in the late 1970s when the new Sheffield power box took over responsibilities for the area, however the building remained, firstly as an emergency facility due to its strategic location, and later as a staff building.

== Closures ==
The construction of the junction allowed a double track curve at Swinton between Swinton Town station and Mexborough to be closed. At the same time, Doncaster to Sheffield trains were re-routed to Sheffield Midland over the new junction as a part of the plan to close Sheffield Victoria, also resulting in the closure of Rotherham Central in 1966.

== Rationalisation ==
In the late 1980s and early 1990s, the junction was remodelled. The third and fourth running lines north of the junction were removed. To enable trains travelling from Doncaster to Sheffield to call at the new Swinton station the previously lifted double-track curve from the Mexborough line to Swinton was reinstated and almost all passenger traffic routed this way. The old G.C. line was reduced to goods traffic and a limited number of passenger trains run for operational reasons (mainly to maintain train crew route knowledge). At Aldwarke the G.C. line north from the junction was lifted, removing the complexity of the double-scissors crossing, so that all traffic now joined the former Midland line, and the connection to the G.C. in the Mexborough direction was moved to be a single-line ladder junction about 600 metres to the north-east of the previous crossing.

Today Aldwarke is a known bottleneck with many local stopping trains, fast expresses and freight trains all converging on the junction. Prior to its demise, Railtrack had plans to reinstate the third and fourth running lines north of the junction as far as Swinton junction and remodel Swinton station to increase capacity. These plans were not adopted by Railtrack's successor Network Rail in the short term. However the Yorkshire and Humber Route Utilisation Strategy mentions the quadrupling of this section of line as a possible necessity for Control Period 5, i.e. 2014 at the very earliest.

== Industry in the area ==
The junction is sited within a heavy industrial area. Although the coal mines (Aldwarke and Roundwood collieries were adjacent to the junction) have closed, the last in 1964, the Parkgate Iron and Steel Company invested heavily in the mid-1960s in the development of a new site alongside the GC with rail access. Nowadays the site is owned by Corus and comprises not just the Aldwarke (new site) melting and steel processing but was developed further with the opening of the Thrybergh Bar Mill in 1976. At the north end of the junction, adjacent to the North Midland line, and rail connected to it, is situated the just post-war, and now closed, Roundwood Rolling Mill (commonly known because of the size of the mill as the "11 inch mill"). However, the former blast furnace and open hearth steel melting plant to the rear of Parkgate and Rawmarsh station are gone, replaced by large retail parks. The road names, however, reflect the railway theme, although most not from the railways of this area. (Note: The nearby "Great Eastern Way" is, in fact, named after the Isambard Kingdom Brunel ship of the same name; the metal plates for its construction being produced at the Parkgate Iron and Steel Company).
