= Warren House Colliery =

Former coal mine in South Yorkshire, England

Coordinates: 53°28′41″N 1°21′15″W

Warren House Colliery was a coal mine situated to the north of Rawmarsh, near Rotherham, South Yorkshire, England.

The colliery within lands owned by Earl Fitzwilliam was opened in the early 19th century and closed in, or shortly after, the First World War. The pit was leased to Wakefield-based agents J. J. Charlesworth & Company. The colliery was connected underground with two other local Charlesworth pits, Warren Vale Colliery and Kilnhurst Colliery.

Some remains of the colliery buildings and one of the spoil heaps still remain after almost 100 years after closure.
