= Dalton Main Collieries Ltd. =

Former coal mining company in South Yorkshire, England

The Dalton Main Collieries Limited became a public company which appeared on the London Stock Exchange in December 1899. The company was set up by John Brown and Company with the aim of purchasing Roundwood Colliery at Parkgate and to purchase land between Thrybergh and Ravenfield, known as Silverwood, and sink a new deep colliery there. By the time production was in full swing at Silverwood in 1909 John Brown were sole proprietors of the Dalton Main Company.

== Early history ==
The name "Aldwarke" refers to an area in the Don Valley about 2 miles north of Rotherham, South Yorkshire stretching to the outskirts of the village of Kilnhurst. To its west is Parkgate, to its east the villages of Dalton and Thrybergh. The washlands of the river Don (known locally as "The Wash") was crossed by a toll road which was freed of toll in the late 1980s.

Coal gathering at Aldwarke goes back to the 17th century with documents relating to tenants' rights of way over the grounds and the river Dunne (Don) at Aldwarke ford, on both sides of river; and to any person fetching coals from pits. Earlier records still refer to "charkcole (charcoal) to be cut in Rounde woodde near Aldwarke Manor house".

== Deeper Mining ==
In 1880 John Brown and Company Limited were listed as being the owners of Aldwarke Main at Parkgate. This colliery dated from 1867 and worked the Barnsley Seam, this being deepened to the Parkgate Seam some 10 years later. The second shaft was sunk to reach the Silkstone Seam in 1884.

In 1880 a neighbouring colliery at Roundwood, Parkgate, near Rotherham was listed as being owned by Cooper, Sellars and Company. Sixteen years later the owners were recorded as being the Roundwood Colliery Company. This was the colliery which was purchased by John Brown and Company and became the foundation of the Dalton Main Collieries Company.

The Roundwood and Dalton Colliery Limited was registered in 1898 and as the Dalton Main Collieries Limited became a public company which was floated on the London Stock Exchange in December 1899. The main purpose of the company was to buy out the business of Roundwood Colliery, purchase land at Silverwood, between Thrybergh and Ravenfield, and sink a new deep colliery there. The collieries at Roundwood, Silverwood were to be connected by a railway, known as John Brown's Private Railway, via the boat staithe, but with no main line connections. This was built by the colliery company, which had been bought by steelmaker John Brown, because the railway companies were unwilling to take on the work with, initially, little or no return. Once coal was being drawn from Silverwood the attitude of the railways changed and they were willing the take over the line as part of the Rotherham, Laughton and Maltby Railway which later became part of the Great Central and Midland Joint Railway from which time it gained main line connections.

The collieries at Roundwood and Silverwood were connected underground in 1908.
