= Rotherham Road railway station =

Disused railway station in South Yorkshire, England

Rotherham Road
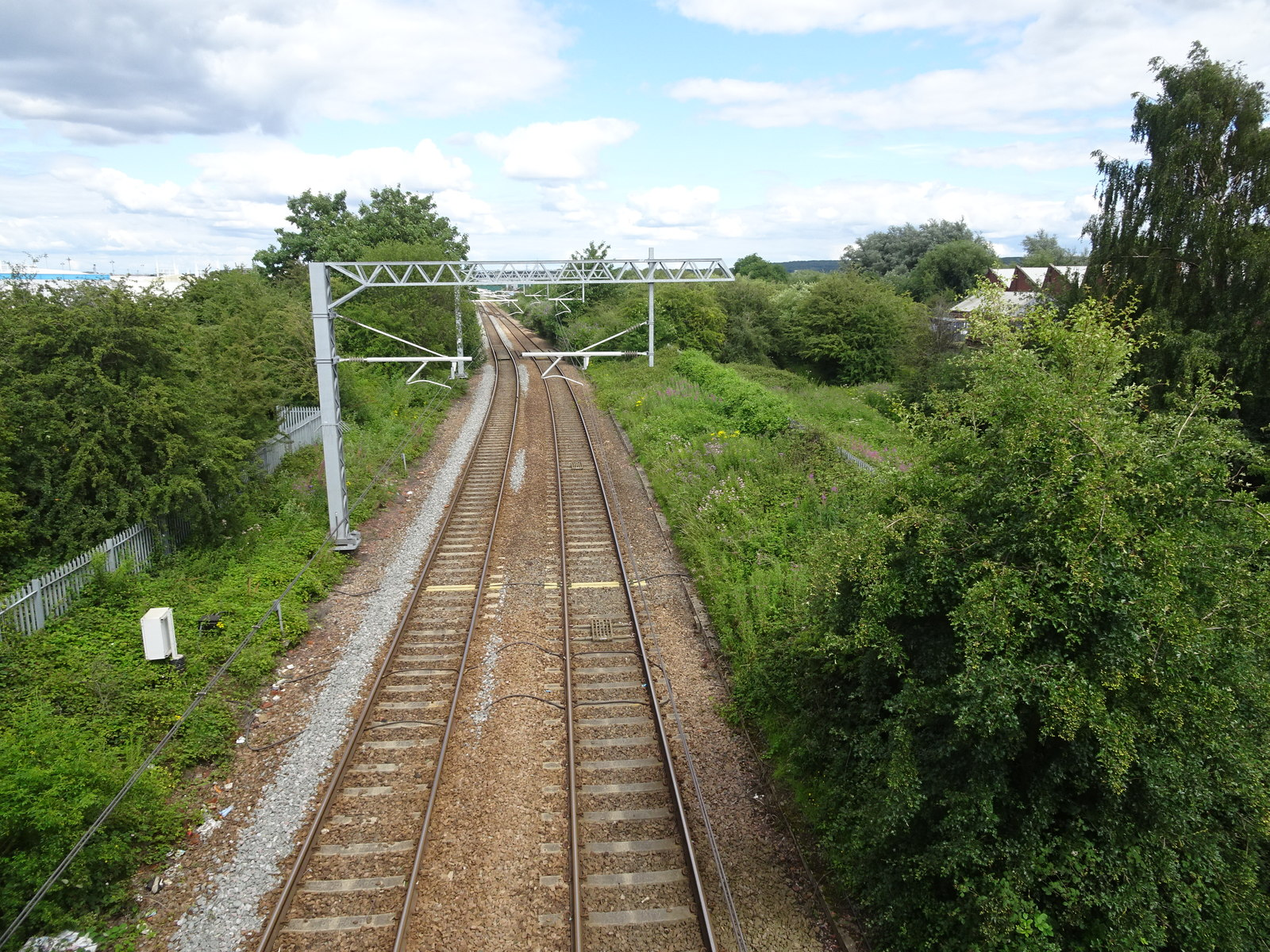
- Station site in July 2020.

General information
- Location: Rotherham, Rotherham; England
- Coordinates: 53.441220°N 1.349900°W
- Grid reference: SK432940
- Platforms: 2

Other information
- Status: Disused

History
- Original company: Manchester, Sheffield and Lincolnshire Railway
- Pre-grouping: Great Central Railway
- Post-grouping: London and North Eastern Railway

Key dates
- 1871: opened
- 1953: closed
Location

Rotherham Road railway station, named Park Gate until 1 November 1895, was a railway station situated in Rotherham, South Yorkshire, England. It was built close to the Rotherham borough boundary with access from Rawmarsh Road, Rotherham and served two rows of stone build terraced houses, "Parkgate Row", closest to the station and "Stone Row", actually on Rotherham Road, Parkgate.

The station, opened in September 1871, was built in the Manchester, Sheffield & Lincolnshire Railway's (MS&LR) "Double Pavilion" style with the main building on the Doncaster bound platform, approach being from Rotherham Road.

This station was provided with a private waiting room reserved for the use of Earl Fitzwilliam and his parties. This facility also included a toilet with the Earl's crest featured on the w.c. In particular this involved regular travel to Doncaster for the St. Leger race meeting when an all first class train was run from Sheffield to Doncaster calling only at Rotherham Road.

The station was closed on 5 January 1953.

The stationmaster had, under his control, the small yard and interchange sidings on the Rotherham side of the station. This handled some of the traffic to and from South Yorkshire Coke and Chemicals works and, from 1873 via Earl Fitzwilliam's private railway, his colliery interests. At the buffer stops end of the yard there was a wagon repair facility which closed many years ago. The access to the yard was controlled by Rotherham Road signal box until 10 May 1987 when Sheffield power box took over control of the line between Holmes Junction and Aldwarke Junction. The box was demolished over the weekend of 30–31 January 1988.

Immediately on the Parkgate side of the station was a small swing bridge carrying the line over the Greasbrough Canal which necessitated a 10 mph (16 km/h) speed limit, which has been raised since the span was fixed. This was controlled by an early MS&LR hipped roof signal box named "Parkgate" built on the Parkgate side of the canal by the line. This early signal box was removed in the early years of the 20th century, a few years after the opening of Rotherham Road signal box. At the nationalisation of the canals, this canal was not included and it belongs to Earl Fitzwilliam's Estates.

Preceding station	Disused railways	Following station
Rotherham Central	Eastern Region of British Railways; Sheffield Victoria-Doncaster Line	Parkgate and Aldwarke
