= Stewarts & Lloyds =

British steel manufacturer

Stewarts & Lloyds was a steel tube manufacturer with its headquarters in Glasgow at 41 Oswald Street. The company was created in 1903 by the amalgamation of two of the largest iron and steel makers in Britain: A. & J. Stewart & Menzies, Coatbridge, North Lanarkshire, Scotland; and Lloyd & Lloyd, Birmingham, England.

== History ==
=== Stewart & Menzies Ltd ===
A. & J. Stewart & Menzies Ltd. was founded as A. & J. Stewart. Andrew Stewart was originally employed as a salesman by Eadies of Dalmarnock, South Lanarkshire, specialists in the manufacture of lap-welded and loose flange tubes. Stewart saw a market for gas pipe, but the company would not acknowledge his proposals. In 1860, Andrew set up business as a maker of butt-welded and lap-welded tubes, establishing a small works at St Enochs, Glasgow, taking his brother James into partnership in 1862. The company met with rapid success, and in 1867 moved to a large site at Coatbridge, North Lanarkshire, where it built the Clyde Tube Works. In 1882 the company was incorporated with limited liability as A. & J. Stewart Ltd.

In 1889 Andrew saw his sons set up their own business in Glasgow as tube manufacturers under the name of Stewart Brothers. In a rationalisation of the tube making industry in Scotland, A. & J. Stewart Ltd merged with Stewart Brothers and the Clydesdale Iron & Steel Company becoming A. & J. Stewart & Clydesdale Ltd. but in 1898, the company took on another new name when it acquired the business of James Menzies & Company becoming A. & J. Stewart & Menzies Ltd. From 1 January 1903 the company merged with English counterparts Lloyd & Lloyd Ltd.

=== Lloyd & Lloyd Ltd ===
The history of Lloyd & Lloyd Ltd closely paralleled that of A. & J. Stewart, establishing itself as one of the largest iron and steel tube manufacturers in England. It was founded in 1859 by Samuel Lloyd and his cousin William Rigge Lloyd, and its premises were at Nile Street, Birmingham. Over the next 40 years it became the premier manufacturer of tubes in England. The Clydeside Tube Co. Ltd., makers of weldless tubes was acquired by Lloyd & Lloyd in 1900 and was also brought into the 1903 merger. Samuel's son Albert William was a director of Lloyd & Lloyd when the merger with Stewarts & Menzies came about in 1903 and then became a director of the newly formed company of Stewarts & Lloyds. From the date of the merger, Samuel Lloyd had nothing to do Stewarts & Lloyds and concentrated on Lloyds Ironstone Company, with his son Samuel Janson Lloyd.

==== Lloyds Ironstone Company ====
Iron ore had been mined in the Corby, Northamptonshire area for some time, when Samuel Lloyd came to the village in 1880 and negotiated the purchase of the mineral rights for the Manor of Corby. Extraction commenced in the following year and the ore was then transported by rail to the Albion Works in the West Midlands. Lloyds Ironstone Company, who erected two blast furnaces on the edge of the village in 1910, started iron production but the main problem was the extraction of the ore itself, the physical act of getting the ore from the ground was in need of mechanization and before the end of the 19th century a mechanical digger, with a bucket capable of holding 11 cubic yards arrived in the mines. To increase production further a steam shovel, after finishing work on the construction of the Manchester Ship Canal, was brought to Corby. Its bucket could hold nearly three times the amount of its earlier, smaller brother. In 1918, Samuel Lloyd died and control passed to Samuel Janson Lloyd, who in 1919 brokered a merger with Alfred Hickman & Sons, of Bilston, which in turn was absorbed into the Stewarts & Lloyds group of companies in 1920, thus bringing the Corby site under Stewarts & Lloyds control.

=== Stewarts & Lloyds ===
The newly merged company, now named Stewarts & Lloyds Ltd set about to establish its position and extending its interests. In 1908 the company became colliery owners when they acquired the control of Robert Addie & Sons (Collieries) Ltd., although this interest was sold in 1924. Before the outbreak of the First World War the company bought the British Welding Co of Motherwell, manufacturer of hydraulic welded tubes and established a new works at Tollcross, Glasgow. Following the end of the war the company gained control of the Northern Lincolnshire Iron Company, followed shortly afterwards by Alfred Hickman & Sons and its subsidiaries.

Expansion of the sphere of the company continued in the latter 1920s, gaining in the UK 70% control of the Victaulic Company Limited, producer of Victaulic joints and Johnson couplings (which were not produced until the 1930s) for pipelines, the Pothero Steel Tube Co Ltd and then the Birmingham steelworks of John Russell & Company.

Further colliery interests were acquired when in 1923 the company gained control of Kilnhurst Colliery in the South Yorkshire coalfield, although this was sub-leased to Sheffield steelmakers John Brown & Company This interest was sold, along with its adjoining brickworks, to the Tinsley Park Colliery Company of Sheffield in 1936.

In 1930, Stewarts & Lloyds Ltd entered into an agreement with Tube Investments, of Abingdon, Oxfordshire, which controlled a large number of tube making firms in the Midlands. Although this was to “facilitate exchange of information and technology” it resulted in S & L gaining a half interest in the Bromford Tube Co of Erdington, Birmingham, acquiring the other half in 1945; and in Howell & Co Ltd, Sheffield, this being given up in 1938.

From the late 1800s, both founding companies had been represented in Australia as distributors of tube. Growing demand in Australia eventually led to the formation of a jointly owned company with BHP to be known as Buttweld Pty Ltd, and the establishment of Australia's first tubemaking plant at Newcastle in 1935. This company ultimately became Tubemakers of Australia.

==== Corby Steelworks ====
The company decided to move to Corby, Northamptonshire (52.498414°N 0.662788°W), in November 1932, enabling it to make use of the local iron ore to feed their blast furnaces and Bessemer steel converters. The new construction was carried out to a very tight timetable, from the clearing of the site in 1933 the first of the Corby blast furnaces was lit in May the following year. This was followed by coke from the new coke ovens the following month and the ore preparation and Sinter Plants in September. No.2 blast furnace was lit in November and the first steel came from the Bessemer converters on 27 December. The last of the originally planned blast furnaces (No.3) was lit in October 1935. Following a rebuild to increase capacity of No.2 furnace, Corby works became the third-most economic pig iron producing plant in the world.

Looking for greater capacity, in 1936, a fourth blast furnace, a second sinter plant, a new Bessemer plant, and new coking capacity, six new ovens being added to the existing battery and a new battery of 21 ovens were constructed and in operation by the end of 1937.

To add to steel production two electric arc furnaces were built in 1941. The ingots cast from the electric furnace were of a different shape and size to any others and were shipped to Bilston for further processing.

By 1953, the company, making use of its original eight work sites, became the main producer of steel tubes in Scotland, producing around 250,000 tons of tubing, the bulk of which were used at the Corby site.

Further developments took place after World War II, with an open-hearth steel making facility being commissioned in 1949. The Glebe coke ovens were extended to their maximum number of 141 in 1953, and plans for No. 6 coke oven battery were formulated shortly afterward. These were to be built on old quarry workings to the north of the Open-Hearth building, and enough land was levelled to accommodate a complete blast furnace plant as well as for the coke ovens by-products plant and gasholder. No. 6 battery of 51 ovens was commissioned in 1961; however, after the footings were installed for the blast furnace, the rest of the construction was put temporarily on hold, and work was never continued.

In an attempt to make the Bessemer plant more efficient it was trialled with a blast enriched with oxygen, but when a basic oxygen steelmaking test plant was built in 1960, a major change in steel production at the works was signalled. Trials were conducted using the BOS process; and in 1965, with a three-vessel plant coming on stream, the Bessemer plant closed, having produced almost 18 million tons of steel since 1934.

==== Second World War ====
In common with other steel producers, from the outbreak of World War II, much of the output went to war-related usage. The best-known contribution of the works was Pipe Line Under The Ocean (PLUTO), a pipeline built, following the Normandy landings to supply fuel for the invading forces. Almost 1,000 miles of steel tubes went into the main HAMEL project. In acknowledgement of the Corby steelworks' contribution to PLUTO, a public house in Corby was named The Pluto. The pub has since closed and the site is awaiting development.

Another large contribution was the 15,000 miles of tube, used for the construction of beach defences, termed Admiralty scaffolding. These were then covered with barbed wire, and other, more dangerous obstructions, becoming known as Wallace Swords. A total of over 275,000 miles (about 2.5 million tons) of tube were produced for war-related work during 1939–45. Other works in the S&L group provided steel for shell forgings, finished shells and shot.

=== Nationalisation ===
The steel industry was nationalised for the second time, and the company became part of the British Steel Corporation in 1967.

Due to the high cost and low quality of local iron ore, steel production at Corby was set to close in November 1979. This was delayed until 21 May 1980, due to a national steel strike, when the last coil came off the mill. In nearly 40 years of steel production they had made almost 2.5 million tons. Tubemaking continues to this day, initially based on steel supplied from Teesside, and today Tata Steel Tubes is the largest customer of steel from South Wales.
