= Silverwood Colliery platform =

General information
- Location: Silverwood Colliery, Rotherham; England
- Coordinates: 53.44231°N 1.28779°W
- Grid reference: SK474941
- Platforms: 1

Other information
- Status: Disused
Location

Silverwood Colliery platform, the original, was a wooden railway platform built for John Brown's Private Railway in order to operate Paddy Mail trains from Roundwood Colliery to Silverwood Colliery to bring their workers to the new coal mine. The trains were operated by a rake of seven former Mersey Railway coaches hauled by a vacuum brake fitted locomotive, regular assisted by an additional locomotive on the front for extra power. These lasted until the 1930s when, either the workers at Silverwood had moved to new housing in Thrybergh, or were in a position to use the new "pit buses" operated by private companies and later by Rotherham Corporation. The platform was removed shortly after the last train left.

The second Silverwood Colliery platform was a specially constructed railway platform built with only one passenger in mind, H. M. The Queen, when she visited the colliery on 31 July 1975. The royal party stayed overnight on the Royal Train in Silverwood Colliery Sidings before the colliery visit the following day when the platform was used for its only time. The Royal Train was hauled by Class 47 locomotive No.47172. The platform was removed shortly after the royal visit.
