= Listed buildings in Rawmarsh =

Rawmarsh is a civil parish in the Metropolitan Borough of Rotherham, South Yorkshire, England. The parish contains five listed buildings that are recorded in the National Heritage List for England. Of these, one is listed at Grade II*, the middle of the three grades, and the others are at Grade II, the lowest grade. The parish contains the village of Rawmarsh, and the listed buildings consist of a farmhouse, a rectory, a pumping house, and a church and associated structures.

== Key ==
Grade	Criteria
II*	Particularly important buildings of more than special interest
II	Buildings of national importance and special interest

== Buildings ==
Name and location	Photograph	Date	Notes	Grade
Hall Farmhouse; 53.47184°N 1.35764°W	—	1736	The farmhouse is in pebbledashed sandstone, with quoins, and a Welsh slate roof with square-cut gable copings and shaped kneelers. It is partly in three storeys and partly in two, and has six bays. The left doorway has an architrave with plinth blocks, and above it is a dated and initialled plaque. To the right is a doorway with a chamfered quoined surround and a shaped lintel. The windows either have a single light, or are mullioned, with some mullions removed.	II
St Mary's Rectory; 53.45827°N 1.34427°W		1752–53	The former rectory is in sandstone on a plinth, with a sill band, and a Welsh slate roof. There are two storeys and an attic, a front of three bays, the middle bay projecting under a pediment, the outer bays with half-pediments, and a later wing recessed on the left. In the centre is a porch with double doors in a Tudor arched opening flanked by Doric columns. Above is a cornice with an inscription, a panel with a cross, and a coped gable with a fleur-de-lys finial. Above the porch is a Venetian window in a blind arch, and elsewhere the windows are sashes. In the right return is a curved bay window.	II*
Pumping house 53.45578°N 1.34695°W		1823 (or earlier)	The pumping house is in sandstone with Welsh slate roof, and consists of a tower, and a lean-to and workshops on the right. The tower is gabled, with two storeys, and has a round-arched opening in each floor. In the ground floor the opening has dated voussoirs and an impost band, and in front of the upper floor opening is a brick and concrete gantry. The lean-to contains a casement window, and in the single-storey workshops are infilled round archways.	II
St Mary's Church; 53.45831°N 1.34492°W		1837–39	The church was designed by J. P. Pritchett, the tower was added in 1869–70, and there were further additions in 1896–98, including a chancel. The church is built in sandstone with a Welsh slate roof, and consists of a nave with a clerestory, north and south aisles, a chancel with an apse, a north organ chamber and a south vestry, and a west tower. The tower has three stages, it incorporates a Norman south doorway, there is a southwest stair turret, a two-light west window, paired bell openings, and a clock face under a quatrefoil-pierced parapet with eight pinnacles. Most of the windows in the body of the church are lancets, in the nave they are coupled, in the clerestory they are triple, and the east window has three stepped lancets.	II
Railings and walled enclosure, St Mary's Church; 53.45820°N 1.34505°W	—	Mid to late 19th century	To the east, south and west of the church is a plinth wall dividing it from the churchyard. It is in sandstone and has chamfered coping. On the wall are iron railings, and it contains a gate opposite the south door of the tower.	II
