= John Brown's Private Railway =

John Brown's railway was a line constructed in the Rotherham area of South Yorkshire, England, in order to link Silverwood Colliery to staithes situated alongside the River Don. The line, along with the collieries, became the sole property of John Brown & Company of Sheffield, in 1910, giving the line its local name.

John Brown and Company were also the owners of other collieries in South Yorkshire, including Rotherham Main, which was served by a Great Central branch line.

== History ==
Roundwood Colliery, situated in the Don Valley, between the lines of the Midland Railway, north of Parkgate and Rawmarsh and the Manchester, Sheffield and Lincolnshire Railway, north of Parkgate and Aldwarke was established in the 1860s and had connections to both railways and to staithes alongside the river.

In 1898, a new company was formed to take over Roundwood Colliery and to develop a new colliery at Silverwood, near Thrybergh. These collieries and the boat staithes were to be linked by a railway. The company was originally known as "The Roundwood and Dalton Colliery Co.", becoming Dalton Main Collieries Limited in December 1899.

The railway companies serving Roundwood were approached to build a line to Silverwood but both declined and so it was built privately as "The Roundwood and Dalton Colliery Railway". The line was opened in 1901 and its main engineering work was a girder bridge crossing the River Don which was built by Newton, Chambers & Company. The line was known for its gradients, the main section being between 1 in 44 and 1 in 56.

The line became part of the Rotherham, Maltby and Laughton Railway which, in turn, became the major part of the Great Central and Midland Joint Railway in South Yorkshire.

== Accidents ==
As may be imagined on a line with steep gradients there was a problem with runaway accidents.

In August 1905, a train going down the hill from Silverwood Colliery to Roundwood could not hold back its load and the locomotive, Dalton Main Colliery No.4 (Andrew Barclay, Works No. 1021, built 1904) was overpowered. The crew jumped after passing over the River Don bridge. The driver suffered only shock. The fireman was slightly injured. At the point where the colliery line passed below the Great Central line the locomotive left the rails but stayed upright through the bridge and fell into the marshy ground beyond. The wagons were totally destroyed and the track seriously damaged. The locomotive was repaired and survived a further 21 years until being scrapped. Slippery rails covered with natural evening moisture together with water dripping from the wagonloads of 'slack' were blamed.

On 30 September 1910, not long after the railway had become the property of the G.C. & M. J.R., a loaded coal train leaving Silverwood Colliery with 50 wagons went out of control and ran away. The Mexborough locomotive crew jumped, the driver sustaining minor injuries, the fireman being bruised. Catchpoints prevented the train reaching the main line, although some of the wagons did so. The locomotive ended on the canal towpath. The signal box, Thrybergh Junction, was saved, although it did suffer in a later accident and fell backwards into the river. The signalman, reportedly, left his box hurriedly - hardly surprising!

== Passenger services ==
The line did not have a regular public passenger service. However, the colliery company, by an agreement with the railway committee, did run Workmen's Trains, often referred to as Paddy Mails using seven coaches which were bought from the Mersey Railway in early 1905. These trains linked Roundwood Colliery, the river boat staithe and Silverwood Colliery. Under a similar agreement, the colliery company could also work their own trains over the line, for internal traffic only.

In 1959, a platform was constructed on the line, near to Whinney Hill in Thrybergh, to serve the "Children's Outings" organised by local Working Men's Clubs. This was known as Thrybergh Tins and closed in the mid-1960s.

== Closures ==
The connection to the Great Central at Roundwood was removed in March 1914. The line from Don Bridge East Junction to Roundwood was closed in the 1960s but a single track was retained as a 'trap' for runaways. The line beyond Silverwood to Hellaby (Great Central, Hull & Barnsley and Midland Joint) was closed in 1967 for the construction of a motorway bridge: it never reopened, being officially closed from March 1969. The main line from Thrybergh Junction to Silverwood was singled in spring 1975.

== British Steel ==
The part of line at Roundwood, using the original bridge (Don Bridge) over the River Don, was bought and reopened in the mid-1970s, by British Steel Corporation in connection with their new Thrybergh Bar Mill.
