= Dalton, South Yorkshire =

Civil parish in South Yorkshire, England

Coordinates: 53.443°N 1.317°W

Dalton
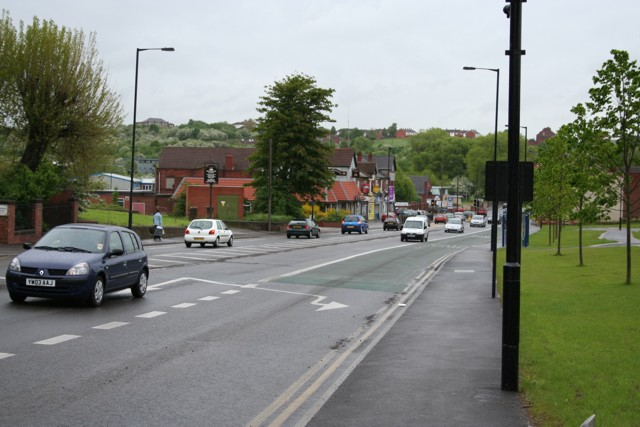
- Dalton Lane, Dalton

- Location within South Yorkshire
- Population: 10,292 (2011)
- OS grid reference: SK448947
- Metropolitan borough: Rotherham
- Metropolitan county: South Yorkshire
- Region: Yorkshire and the Humber
- Country: England
- Sovereign state: United Kingdom
- Post town: Rotherham
- Postcode district: S65, S66
- Dialling code: 01709
- Police: South Yorkshire
- Fire: South Yorkshire
- Ambulance: Yorkshire

Dalton is a civil parish in the Metropolitan Borough of Rotherham in South Yorkshire, England. Dalton is situated 162 miles (260.7 km) north from London and is 2 miles (3.2 km) north-east from the centre of Rotherham town centre. The population of the parish as taken at the 2011 Census was 10,292. The parish includes the communities of Brecks, Dalton Brook, Dalton Foljambe, Dalton Magna, Dalton Parva, Flanderwell, Sunnyside and Woodlaithes.

== History ==
The civil parish name of “Dalton” means valley farmstead and takes its name from the valley of the Dalton Brook located nearby. There are two entries for Dalton in the Domesday Book reflecting the two settlements with in the parish. The two main settlements in Dalton were the hamlets of Dalton Magna and Dalton Parva. A third settlement, Dalton Brook, grew up along the Rotherham - Doncaster Road due to the need of extra houses for the ever-expanding population. The Church, known as the Holy Trinity Church, located in Dalton Parva was erected in 1848 and completed in 1849 by G. S. Foljambe. At first the Holy Trinity Church was only permitted to complete the Baptism procedure. However, in 1850 it gained licences to do both marriages and burials. Initially the land was owned by William de Percy (Governor of York in 1067) and William de Warrene (who was related to William the Conqueror and the builder of Conisbrough Castle) before it was taken over by the parish council. The Parish Council is involved in the provision of allotment gardens, recreation areas, lettings of halls, environmental improvements, provision of cash grants to local organisations and the consideration of local planning matters. It also makes representations to Local Government, National Government, Police, Health Service, Passenger Transport Authority and other organisations on matters which are of concern to the local population.

== Demographics ==
In 2001, according to the Census, it was recorded that there was a population of 9,038. Of which there were 4,435 males and 4,603 females. The population lived in 3,843 households which gives an average of 2.35 people per house. In 1871 the civil parish had a population of 250, of which 175 were in Dalton Parva and 75 in Dalton Magna. In 1881 the hamlet of Aldwarke, formerly a detached portion of the parish of Ecclesfield, was transferred to Dalton. Most of the people worked in agriculture. The population in 1891 was 322. In 1901 it had grown to 438.

Historical population
Year	Pop.	±%
1871	250	—
1881	408	+63.2%
1891	412	+1.0%
1901	438	+6.3%
1911	3,248	+641.6%
1921	3,571	+9.9%
1931	5,161	+44.5%
1951	7,473	+44.8%
1961	7,426	−0.6%
2001	9,038	+21.7%

Since 1980, the rate of population change has slowed over England and Wales from about 15% annual growth to around 5% annual growth. The village of Dalton almost follows the same pattern however between 1900 and 1920 there was almost a 650% increase in population growth. The population density over England and Wales had gradually increased between the years 1880 and 1960. At the same time the population density of Dalton increased between 1900 and 1950 with it leveling off towards 1960. Both these population statistics reflect population growth across England and Wales. The population statistics of Dalton show that it has followed a similar pattern to England and Wales with only the odd anomaly. In the Metropolitan Borough of Rotherham there was an estimated population of 254,000 people in 2011. Between the first census date of 1801 and 1841, no information was recorded regarding each individual persons occupation. This meant that the population was divided into those 'chiefly employed in agriculture', those 'chiefly employed in trade, manufacturers or handicraft', and others.

Historical Occupations in 1881
Occupation	Male	Female
Professionals	4	4
Domestic Services or Offices	8	25
Commercial Occupations	1	0
Transport & Communications	2	0
Agriculture	47	1
Animals	2	0
House, Furniture & Decorations	15	0
Carriages & Harnesses	2	0
Food & Lodging	3	0
Dress	0	4
Various Mineral Substances	18	0
General or Unspecified Commodities	9	0
Persons Without Specified Occupations	2	2
Unknown Occupation	1	72

The 1881 census shows that just under 50% of all males worked in the agriculture, the village's main occupational sector. Female occupations recorded were mainly within domestic services or offices.

== Education ==
Dalton Foljambe Primary School is currently the only school within the parish and located at just under 1 mile (1.6 km) from Dalton Magna is very central. The school takes children from the age of 3 to 11. In 2011 the school received a Grade 2 ("Good") Oftsted report.

Clifton Park Museum, 3 miles (4.8 km) from Dalton, specialises in Roman, Victorian, Second World War and local borough history, and has exhibits of old toys.

== Attractions ==
Within 20 miles (32.2 km) of Dalton are national trust sites, reserves and museums. Nearby villages of interest include Thrybergh, Sunnyside and Listerdale, all situated under 1 mile (1.6 km) away.

Thrybergh Country Park, about 1.5 miles (2.4 km) to the north-east, opened in 1983, and includes the nature reserve of Thrybergh Reservoir, constructed in 1880 to provide water for the area around Doncaster. It was a Green Flag award winner for the Yorkshire and Humberside area in 2006.

== Listed building ==
The parish contains one listed building that is recorded in the National Heritage List for England, namely East Farmhouse and attached outbuilding.
