= Kilnhurst West railway station =

Disused railway station in South Yorkshire, England

Kilnhurst West
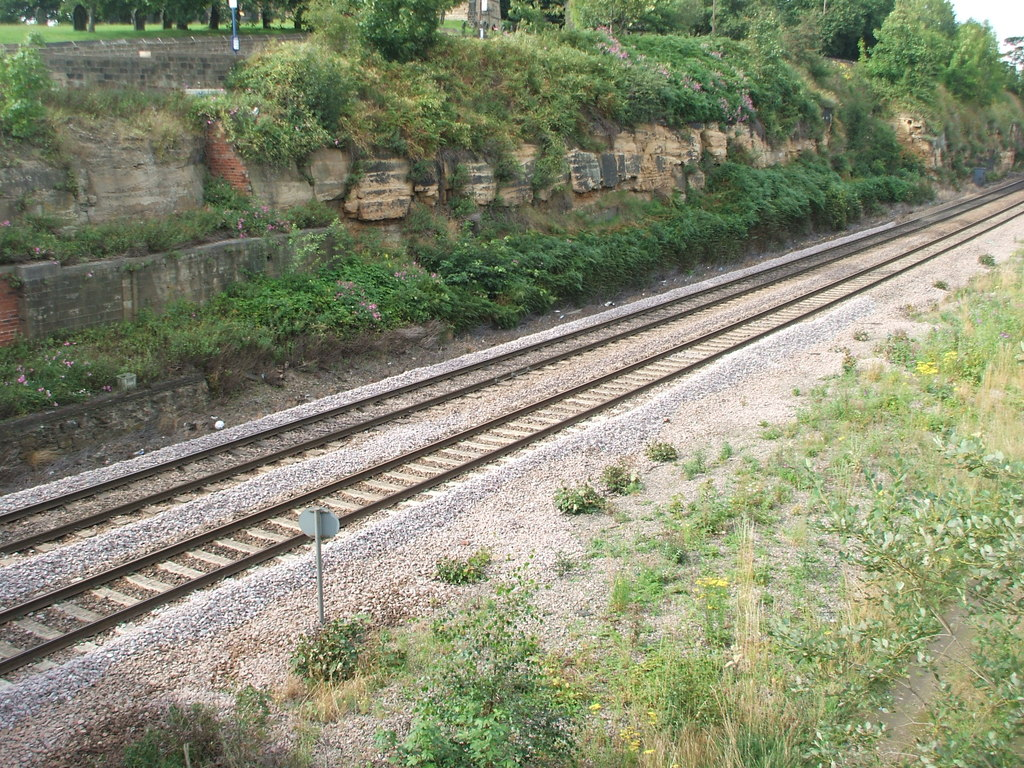
- Site of the former station (2008)

General information
- Location: Kilnhurst, Metropolitan Borough of Rotherham; England
- Coordinates: 53.4709°N 1.3076°W
- Grid reference: SK460973

Other information
- Status: Disused

History
- Original company: North Midland Railway
- Pre-grouping: Midland Railway
- Post-grouping: London, Midland and Scottish Railway

Key dates
- 6 April 1841: Station opened as Kilnhurst
- February 1851: closed
- June 1869: reopened
- 25 September 1950: renamed Kilnhurst West
- 1 January 1968: Station closed
Location

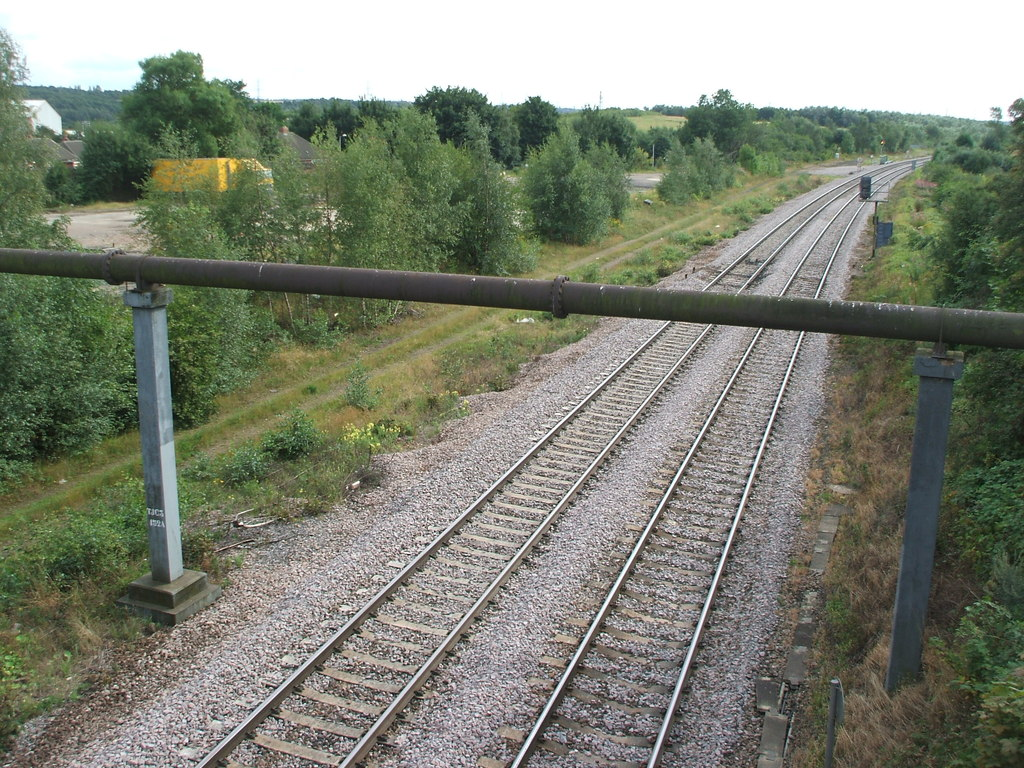
Probable site of the first station in Kilnhurst, closed in 1851

Kilnhurst West railway station was the second railway station on the Midland line in Kilnhurst, South Yorkshire, England. It was one of two railway stations serving the village, the other being Kilnhurst Central. They were situated at either end of the village's main thoroughfare, Victoria Street. The first station in the village, believed to have been on the south side of the bridge, opened by the North Midland Railway, was closed in January 1851.

This station was located on the former North Midland Railway and was served mainly by Sheffield Midland – Cudworth – Leeds stopping services. The station booking office was at road level, with an entrance on Highthorn Road, and was linked to its four platforms by a covered wooden footbridge. By the early 1980s little remained of the station.

The station was closed, along with others on the line, when these trains were axed on 1 January 1968.

The line is still in use for freight, express passenger and local passenger trains, the nearest station to Kilnhurst is now approximately 1 1/2 miles (2.4 km) away at Swinton. Station House, the ex station manager's house still stands on the south west side of the overbridge at the junction of Highthorn Road/Wentworth Road.

Preceding station	Disused railways	Following station
Parkgate and Rawmarsh	BR Eastern Region; Sheffield-Cudworth-Leeds Line	Swinton Town
