= Parkgate Welfare F.C. =

Parkgate Welfare
- Full name: Parkgate Welfare Football Club

Parkgate Welfare F.C. was an English association football club based in Parkgate, Rotherham, South Yorkshire.

== History ==
Little is known of the club other than that they entered the FA Cup in 1950 and won the Sheffield Association League in 1962.

=== League and cup history ===
Parkgate Welfare League and Cup history
Season	Division	Position	FA Cup	FA Amateur Cup
1950–51			1st qualifying round	-
1952–53			-	Extra Preliminary Round
1961–62	Sheffield Association League	1st	-	-

== Honours ==
=== League ===
- Sheffield Association League
  - Champions: 1961–62

== Records ==
- Best FA Cup performance: 1st qualifying round, 1950–51
- Best FA Amateur Cup performance: Extra Preliminary Round, 1952–53
