= Thrybergh Academy =

Location
- Arran Hill; Thrybergh, South Yorkshire, S65 4BJ; England; 53.4508°N 1.2968°W

Information
- Type: Academy
- Motto: Achieving Starts with Believing
- Established: 1957
- Department for Education URN: 148547 Tables
- Ofsted: Reports
- Head teacher: Adrian May
- Gender: Coeducational
- Age: 11 to 16
- Previous names: Thybergh Secondary Modern School (1950s–????); Thybergh Comprehensive School (????–2008); Thybergh School and Sports College (2008–2013)
- Website: http://www.thrybergh.com/

Thrybergh Academy is a coeducational secondary school located in Thrybergh, South Yorkshire, England.

The school was founded as a secondary modern school in the 1950s, with its own buildings being opened in 1956. It later became a comprehensive school.

== History ==
The school was awarded specialist sports college status in 2008, changing its name from Thrybergh Comprehensive School to Thrybergh School and Sports College.

The school converted to academy status in October 2013 and was renamed Thrybergh Academy and Sports College. On 1 May 2014, it formally merged with the local Dalton Foljambe Primary School to become Rotherham's only all-through school, catering for ages 3–16. The school gained new building through a PFI contract connected to the change of status, and has had difficulty servicing the repayments.

In January 2019 he school was rated 'Inadequate' by Ofsted and was placed into special measures. In May 2019 the school received a financial warning from the Education and Skills Funding Agency after the school made a significant financial loss in the previous year. At the end of 2019 the school closed its sport facilities to members of the local community, despite opposition.

In September Thrybergh Academy formally demerged its primary school provision to form the separate Foljambe Primary School. Thrybergh Academy continues to operate as a secondary school.

== Ofsted inspections ==
Since the commencement of Ofsted inspections in September 1993, the school has undergone nine inspections:

Date of inspection	Outcome	Reference
20–?? September 1993	???	
17–?? November 1997	???	
31 March – 3 April 2003	Satisfactory	
11–12 May 2005	Unsatisfactory (special measures)	
21–22 February 2006	Satisfactory	
26–27 January 2009	Good	
3–4 July 2013	Good	
25–26 April 2017	Requires improvement	
15–16 January 2019	Inadequate (special measures)	
12-13 September 2023	Requires Improvement	

== Headteachers ==
- Mr Horace Edgar (Mick) Winch (born 1908 died 1977, first headteacher who arrived from Wath Secondary School)
- Mr David Pridding (April 2005 – August 2009)
- Mrs Beverley Clubley (September 2009 – August 2014)
- Mrs Siobhan Kent (September 2014 – April 2017)
- Mr Steven Rhodes (April 2017 – August 2017)
- Mr Simon Graves (September 2017– 2018)
- Mr Steven Rhodes (September 2018 – 2020)
- Mr David Burnham (March 2020– September 2025)
- Mr Adrian May (September 2025-)
