= Listed buildings in Thrybergh =

Thrybergh is a civil parish in the Metropolitan Borough of Rotherham, South Yorkshire, England. The parish contains four listed buildings that are recorded in the National Heritage List for England. Of these, one is listed at Grade II*, the middle of the three grades, and the others are at Grade II, the lowest grade. The parish contains the village of Thrybergh and the surrounding area. The listed buildings consist of a church, a cross shaft in the churchyard, a large house later used as a golf clubhouse, and a range of farm buildings later used for other purposes.

== Key ==
Grade	Criteria
II*	Particularly important buildings of more than special interest
II	Buildings of national importance and special interest

== Buildings ==
Name and location	Photograph	Date	Notes	Grade
St Leonard's Church; 53.45414°N 1.29842°W		Late 11th century	The church has been altered and extended through the centuries, and was restored in the 19th century. It is built in sandstone, the porch has a stone slate roof, and the other roofs are in lead. The church consists of a nave, a south porch, a chancel, a south vestry, and a west steeple. The steeple has a tower with a three-light west window, a clock face on the south side, string courses, two-light bell openings, gargoyles, an embattled parapet, and a recessed spire with crockets and a weathervane.	II*
St. Leonard's Cross; 53.45391°N 1.29838°W		Late 12th to early 13th century	The cross shaft is in the churchyard of St Leonard's Church and is in magnesian limestone, set in a sandstone plinth. It is about 1.3 metres (4 ft 3 in) high, and carved with various motifs in relief.	II
Thrybergh Park; 53.46165°N 1.29890°W		1812–14	A large house, later a golf club house, it is in sandstone with a Welsh slate roof. There are two storeys, a square plan with fronts of five bays, and a T-shaped service wing to the right with a three-storey tower on the corner. The east front is symmetrical, the middle bay projecting, with octagonal three-stage corner turrets. It has a plinth, moulded sill bands, and an embattled parapet. In the centre is a porch with a Tudor arched arcade and piers rising as crocketed pinnacles, above which is a canted oriel window. The windows in the ground floor are sashes, in the upper floor are cross windows, and the turrets have lancets in the lower stages, and cruciform arrow loops in the top stage.	II
Farm buildings, Chestnut Tree Farm; 53.45222°N 1.29927°W		1816	The farm buildings consisted of a cartshed, a granary, and a stable, and have since been used for other purposes. They are in sandstone and have a tile roof with a coped gable and shaped kneelers on the left. The buildings form an elongated range with two storeys. Most of the openings have been altered.	II
