= Thrybergh Country Park =

Nature reserve in South Yorkshire, England

Coordinates: 53.458°N 1.284°W

Thrybergh Country Park is a reservoir and nature reserve in South Yorkshire. It is located between Thrybergh and Hooton Roberts on the outskirts of Rotherham and opened in 1983.

== History ==
The reservoir was created between 1876 and 1880 as a source of drinking water, primarily to serve the population of Doncaster to the east. In 1980 it was acquired by Rotherham Metropolitan Borough Council who opened the site as a nature reserve and country park in 1983. In 2006 it won a Green Flag Award for its green spaces.

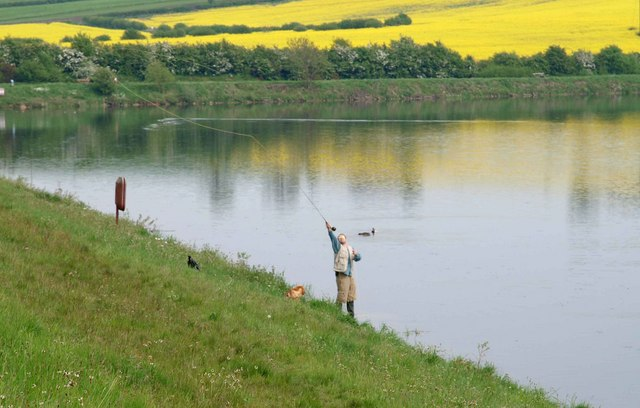
The Lake

== Local and national importance ==
Today the country park provides an important habitat for birds and other wildlife. Over 155 species of birds have been recorded as well as 20 species of mammals and 170 species of plants. It is popular with anglers (fly fishing) during the summer and walkers all year round. There are level footpaths that provide a circular route around the reservoir, and these are suitable for buggies and wheelchairs.

During spring and autumn, it is an important migration stop-over for birds and during the winter months it holds a large population of wintering ducks, geese and swans. Two public bird viewing hides are available.

The country park covers an area of 60 acres (24 ha) and the reservoir itself covers an area of 35 acres (14 ha). There are over 2 miles (3.2 km) of circular footpaths.

== Facilities and activities ==
Thrybergh Country Park has a café with an outdoor seating area and a barbecue area. There is an ice cream parlour, and it is possible to purchase bird seed to feed the ducks. Mobility scooters are also available for hire.

Park rangers are on site and Fly-fishing permits can be purchased between March and October. Float Tubes can be used when fishing and there are rowing boats available via a booking system.

A campsite can be found within the country park, which has pitches for 24 caravans. There is also a children's play area.

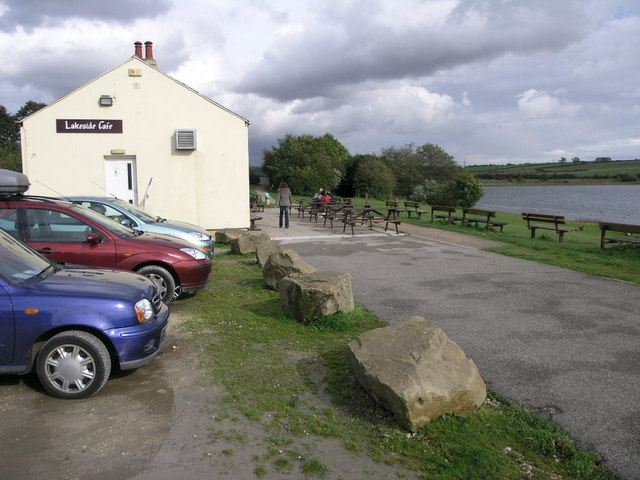
The café
