= Aldwarke =

Industrial area in Rotherham, South Yorkshire, England

Coordinates: 53.44°N 01.33°W

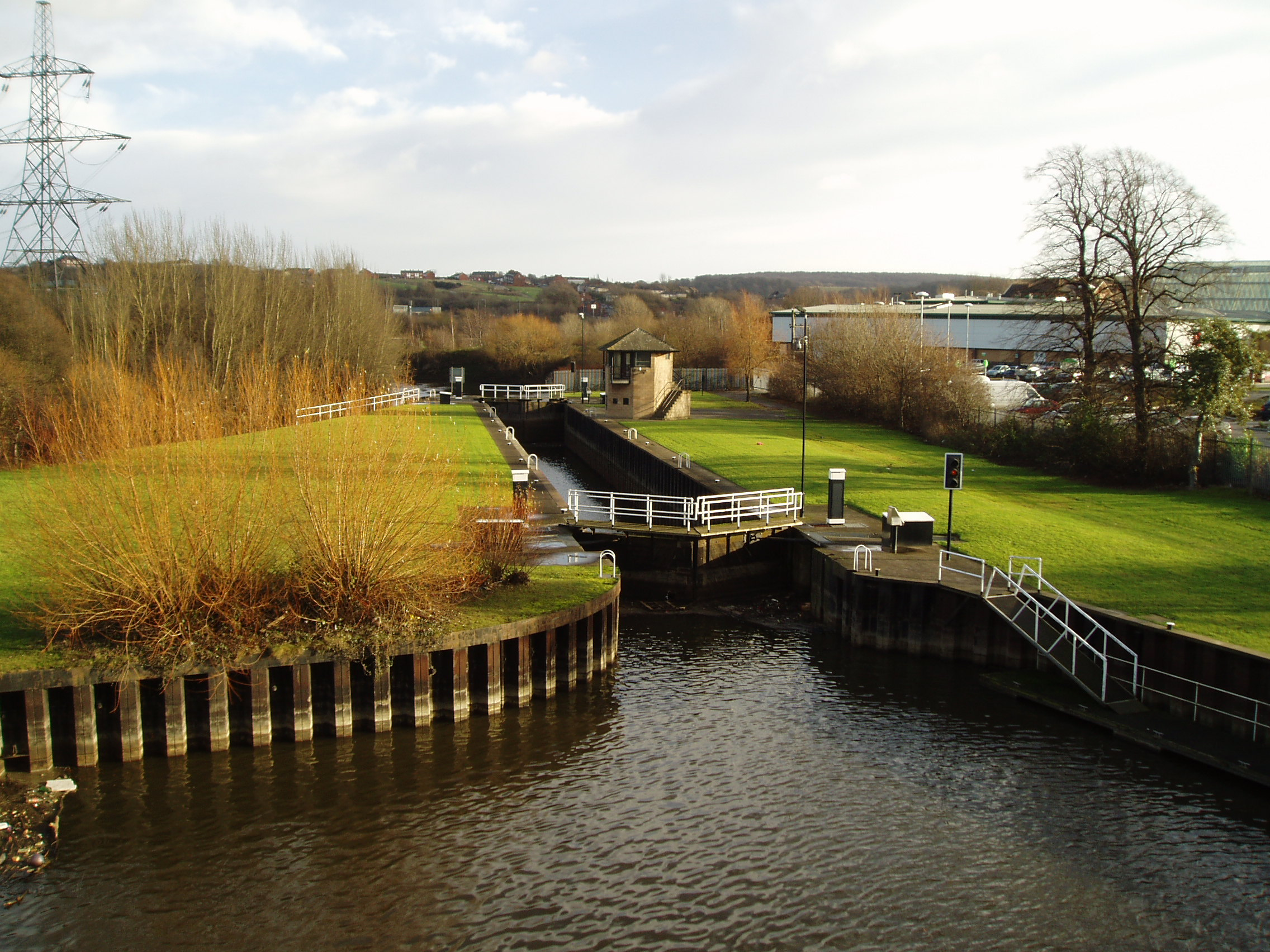
- Aldwarke Lock

- Location within South Yorkshire
- OS grid reference: SK4494
- Metropolitan borough: Rotherham
- Metropolitan county: South Yorkshire
- Region: Yorkshire and the Humber
- Country: England
- Sovereign state: United Kingdom
- Police: South Yorkshire
- Fire: South Yorkshire
- Ambulance: Yorkshire

Aldwarke is an industrial area located in South Yorkshire, England, in the north of Rotherham. Situated to the east of the neighbouring suburb of Parkgate, it lies approximately 1.9 miles (3.1 km) north-east of Rotherham town centre. The area is notable for its steelworks facility, and is home to Aldwarke Lock, which is part of the Don Navigation Canal, running parallel to the River Don.
