= Silverwood Colliery =

Former coal mine in South Yorkshire, England

Coordinates: 53°26′26″N 1°17′2″W

Silverwood pit, shortly before closure

Silverwood Colliery was a colliery situated between Thrybergh and Ravenfield in Yorkshire, England. Originally called Dalton Main, it was renamed after a local woodland. It was owned by Dalton Main Collieries Ltd.

== History ==
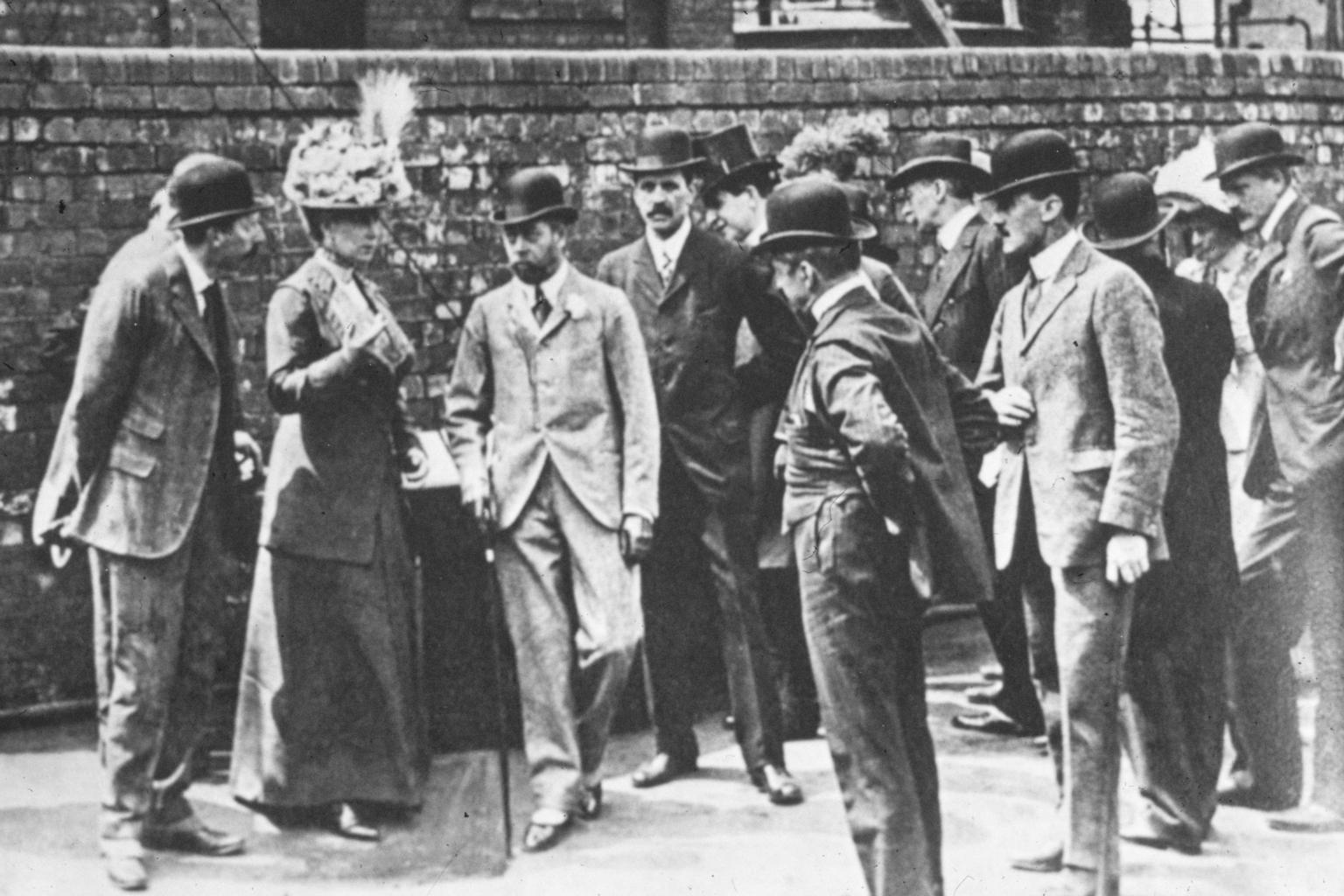
King George V and Queen Mary meet with mine officials at Silverwood Colliery (1912)

Dalton Main Collieries Limited became a public company which was floated on the London Stock Exchange in December 1899. The purpose of the company was to buy out the business of Roundwood Colliery, purchase land at Silverwood, between Thrybergh and Ravenfield, and sink a new deep colliery there. These installations were to be connected to a boat staithe on the River Don by a railway. The first shaft commenced sinking in 1900 and coal was being worked by 1904.

The railway, with its own platform, which from Roundwood Colliery, became known as John Brown's Private Railway after the company which became sole owners of the Dalton Main Collieries from 1909. There was also a line which ran from Silverwood, past Ravenfield, and down to join the existing line just north of Anston.

Royalty visited the mine twice; King George V and Queen Mary paid a visit in July 1912, but left early to drive to Cadeby Colliery after learning of the disaster that had befallen that pit on the very same day. Queen Elizabeth II visited the mine in July 1975 and mined a lump of coal herself.

== Paddy mail crash ==
Shortly after 8 a.m. on 3 February 1966, miners starting their shift went down the pit to board the "Paddy mail". It was normal practice for the ‘man-rider’ to be followed by a second train which carried equipment. On this day the second train suddenly ran out of control and caught up with the ‘man-riding’ train, hitting it hard in the rear. Ten men lost their lives and a further 29 miners were injured.

The accident featured in the local and national press, much of the coverage giving prominence to Sister Adsetts, a member of the Silverwood medical team who, working with members of the Rotherham Mines Rescue team, tended the injured as they were brought from the wreckage. The unusual feature of a woman coming out from the pit led to headlines such as "The Angel with the dirty face".

The accident happened some one and a half miles from the pit bottom in the Braithwell return roadway. When the locomotives and the vehicles were removed to the underground workshops for testing, the brakes proved to be in full working order.

In the report on the accident by the Mines Inspectorate, the main recommendation was that a train carrying materials must not follow a man-riding train. The rules on underground train operation were re-written.

== Closure and redevelopment ==
The colliery closed in 1994, with remaining reserves being worked from nearby Maltby Main Colliery. A large coal washing and reclamation project continued.

During closure the pit was used as the location for the mine accident scene in the film When Saturday Comes.

The area around Woodlaithes Farm, on the edge of the colliery tip, has since been developed as an up-market housing estate known as Woodlaithes Village which has its own "village pond".

Reclamation work finished in 2006, with the Forestry Commission planting tree saplings in 2007. The coal tip has been grassed completely and the once dangerous slurry lake turned into a freshwater nature reserve.

== Sport ==
The colliery had its own football team – Silverwood Colliery F.C. – which competed in the FA Cup on numerous occasions.
