= Warren Vale Colliery =

Former coal mine in South Yorkshire, England

Coordinates: 53°28′26″N 1°19′56″W

Warren Vale Colliery was a coal mine, also known as Piccadilly Colliery, situated alongside Warren Vale Road, between Rawmarsh and Swinton, South Yorkshire, England, in the valley of the Collier Brook, which runs east, for about two miles towards Kilnhurst.

Sinking of the colliery commenced in the late 1840s with production commencing towards the end of 1850. The colliery was owned by Earl Fizwilliam, and was worked by Wakefield–based agents J. & J. Charlesworth & Company. Coal was worked from two seams, the 5 ft. seam was worked at a depth of 90 yards, the 9 ft. seam being found at 127 yards. These seams were connected by a shaft.

The colliery was rail connected to another Charlesworth operation, Kilnhurst Colliery and so to the main line railway (The Manchester, Sheffield and Lincolnshire Railway, Sheffield to Doncaster line). Some small buildings are still standing on the site (2007) and the track of the railway towards Kilnhurst is now a footpath.

Following closure part of the site became the works of Bessacarr Caravans.

== Early accident ==
The colliery had been operating for less than a year when, in December 1851 an accident took place. The Underground Steward went to inspect the workings just prior to the start of the day shift (around 6 a.m.) and was followed shortly afterwards by the miners. About an hour later an explosion took place which "astounded not only those at the pit but the whole neighbourhood". Two corves (small tubs of coal), one filled with 16 cwts.(approx. 1650 kg) of coal and one empty, were propelled skyward out of the shaft and became entangled in the headgear. Another report pointed out that "Some idea may be formed of the effect of the explosion, when it is stated that a man standing at a door of a cottage, upwards of a mile distant, was completely blackened!"

By 9.30 a.m. repairs had been effected to the headgear to enable access to the mine and 14 injured men and boys were lifted out. By mid-afternoon a further 24 men and boys were brought out alive with the first of those killed.

The cause of the explosion, which took place in the northern end of the 9 ft. seam, was cited as a roof fall which blocked the air flow and caused a buildup of foul air which was forced into areas where the miners were working with candles to give light.

In total 51 persons were killed, 24 of these being 16 years or below. In some cases these were fathers and sons, working together. The coroner recorded a verdict of accidental death and commented in his summing up of the lack of inspectors for coal mines, there being only 4 of these in the country, and suggested that the Government should increase this number as soon as possible for the benefit and safety of the workers involved in the industry.
