= Tinsley Park Collieries =

Former coal mine in South Yorkshire, England

Coordinates: 53.401°N 1.403°W

Tinsley Park Collieries were a group of coal mines situated in the Tinsley / Darnall area to the east of the City of Sheffield, South Yorkshire, England.

== History ==
Earl Fitzwilliam's Estates were responsible for the sinking of a colliery at Tinsley in 1819, the same year in which the Greenland Arm of the Sheffield Canal was opened; the Earl being a major contributor. Benjamin Huntsman & Co. acquired the lease to work coal.

The pits, at that time, were basically bell pits and situated throughout the area where a network of small wagonways was built to take the coal to the canal. In 1833 Booth & Company of Park Iron Works in nearby Attercliffe were shown in White’s Directory as the colliery proprietors; the coal being used to produce coke for their iron works. This iron works was bought out by Huntsman, son of Benjamin Huntsman the clockmaker and inventor of crucible steel.

The first shaft was sunk in 1852, and at this time the colliery was managed by William Higgitt, great grandfather of William Leonard Higgitt, and then later by William Higgitt's son-in-law, Henry Chambers. Further shafts were sunk in June 1902 and 1909. Over its lifetime the colliery worked the Wath Wood, High Hazels, Parkgate, Haigh Moor and Barnsley seams. In the 1890s, the chairman of the colliery company was William McConnel, the owner of the Talyllyn Railway and a number of other English coal mines.

In 1938 a loan was authorised to the Renishaw Iron Company, with in return, operational control of that company and the right to supply coke to them, were secured by the Colliery Company. The following year Tinsley Park Collier Company made an offer to acquire J. and G. Wells' Eckington Collieries, with pits at Holbrook, Norwood and Westthorpe.

Profits fell during the war years, a loss being recorded in 1943. Production costs had risen but outputs were down with many the men being in the Forces. The colliery was closed in early 1943. The area was subsequently overbuilt by the English Steel Corporation's Tinsley Park Works (opened 1963, closed 1985)

== Canal connections and wagonways ==
From its opening the collieries in Tinsley Park were connected to the Sheffield Canal by a series of wagonways. Two parallel lines headed south-east from the canal to serve these pits, the longest of these, some 1¼ miles, reaching to the Peacock pit. The canal connection was still visible up to the 1990s.

== Railway connections ==
A new railway, part of the Lancashire, Derbyshire and East Coast Railway, was opened by the Duke of Portland in 1900. This was known as the Sheffield District Railway, a small but important line which ran between the North Midland Railway at Treeton and the Midland Railway at Brightside Junction, reaching a goods station via a spur from Grimesthorpe Junction. This line had short branches to many of the big works along its route, the longest of these at over a mile, served Tinsley Park Colliery Company.

== By-products ==
The colliery, from the end of the 19th century, had a battery of Simon-Carves recovery ovens at work and in 1913 a new battery of 40 regenerative ovens with recovery plant for tar and ammonia were built by the Koppers Coke Oven and By-Product Company of Sheffield. Steam for the Tinsley site was provided by two Lancashire boilers which were fitted with burners for gas firing, the gas coming from their own supplies.

By 1918 coke oven gas from the Tinsley ovens was being supplied to the Sheffield Gas Company. The ovens at Orgreave Colliery also began to supply them from 1922.
