= Parkgate and Aldwarke railway station =

Disused railway station in South Yorkshire, England

Parkgate and Aldwarke

General information
- Location: Parkgate, Rotherham; England
- Coordinates: 53.450720°N 1.331954°W
- Grid reference: SK444950
- Platforms: 2

Other information
- Status: Disused

History
- Original company: Manchester, Sheffield and Lincolnshire Railway
- Pre-grouping: Great Central Railway
- Post-grouping: London and North Eastern Railway

Key dates
- 1873: opened
- 1951: closed
Location

Parkgate and Aldwarke railway station was a railway station situated in Parkgate a district of Rotherham, South Yorkshire, England on the Manchester, Sheffield and Lincolnshire Railway company's line between Rotherham Road and Kilnhurst Central. The station, opened in July 1873, was originally known as "Aldwarke", taking its name from the local manor house nearby which it served along with 8 or 9 servants cottages and a small farmstead. The principal reason for the building of the station, however, was its close proximity to two local collieries, Aldwarke Main and Roundwood. The stopping passenger service fitted in with the requirements of the shift workers at collieries and with many workers living in Rotherham it was recorded that over 100 men would arrive at the station for the early shift alone.

The station was built in the M.S.& L.R. "Double Pavilion" style with the main buildings on the Doncaster-bound platform and a waiting shelter on the other. The station also had the only wall drinking-fountain on the line, a feature of many M.S.& L.R. rebuilt stations. The station facilities included a small goods yard with two sidings and a carriage and cattle dock.

The station was closed to passengers on 29 October 1951.

The access to the station, its sidings and both Aldwarke and Roundwood collieries was controlled by a signal box, named Aldwarke Main, situated some 100 yards on the Doncaster side of the station.

Preceding station	Disused railways	Following station
Rotherham Road	Eastern Region of British Railways; Sheffield Victoria-Doncaster Line	Kilnhurst Central
