= Thrybergh =

Village and civil parish in South Yorkshire, England

Coordinates: 53.45°N 1.30°W

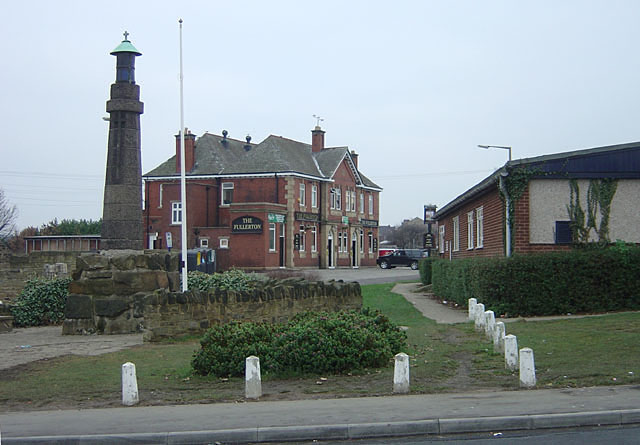
- War memorial and public house

- Location within South Yorkshire
- Population: 4,058 (2011)
- OS grid reference: SK466949
- Civil parish: Thrybergh
- Metropolitan borough: Rotherham
- Metropolitan county: South Yorkshire
- Region: Yorkshire and the Humber
- Country: England
- Sovereign state: United Kingdom
- Post town: ROTHERHAM
- Postcode district: S65
- Dialling code: 01709
- Police: South Yorkshire
- Fire: South Yorkshire
- Ambulance: Yorkshire
- UK Parliament: Wentworth

Thrybergh is a village and civil parish in the Metropolitan Borough of Rotherham in South Yorkshire, England, 3 miles (4.8 km) from Rotherham. It had a population of 4,327 in 2001, reducing to 4,058 at the 2011 Census.

== History ==
The name Thrybergh derives from the Old English þrēoberg meaning 'three hills/tumuli'.

Thrybergh – which is mentioned in the Domesday Book – was given to William de Perci, a chief aide to William the Conqueror and founder of the well-known Percy family, after the Norman conquest of England in 1066.

The estate was passed on to the Normainvilles around the year 1200, and it remained with them until 1316, when Sir Adam Reresby became Lord of Thrybergh. For the next 400 or so years, an unbroken succession of sixteen generations of Reresbys held their place in Thrybergh.

== Facilities ==
Thrybergh has many schools, including Thrybergh Academy, Thrybergh Primary, Foljambe Primary, St Gerards Catholic Primary, and Thrybergh Fullerton Primary.

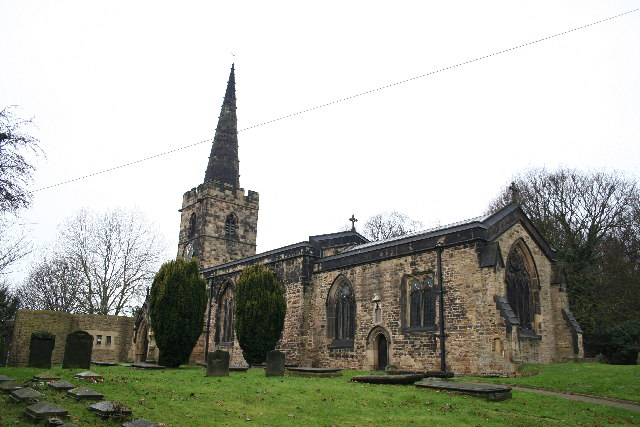
St Leonard's church

There are three churches in Thrybergh, St Gerard's Catholic, St Leonard's Church of England, and St Peter's Church of England. St Leonard's has a nave built in the eleventh and twelfth centuries, with later windows, a fourteenth-century chancel, and a fifteenth-century tower on the west end, topped by a spire. The building was extensively renovated in 1871 and 1894, and a vestry block was added prior to 1970. Internally, it contains a number of tombs and wall monuments, including the tomb of Ralph Reresby, who died in 1530, and a noteworthy monument to Lionel Reresby and his wife Anne, who died in 1587. The building is grade II* listed.

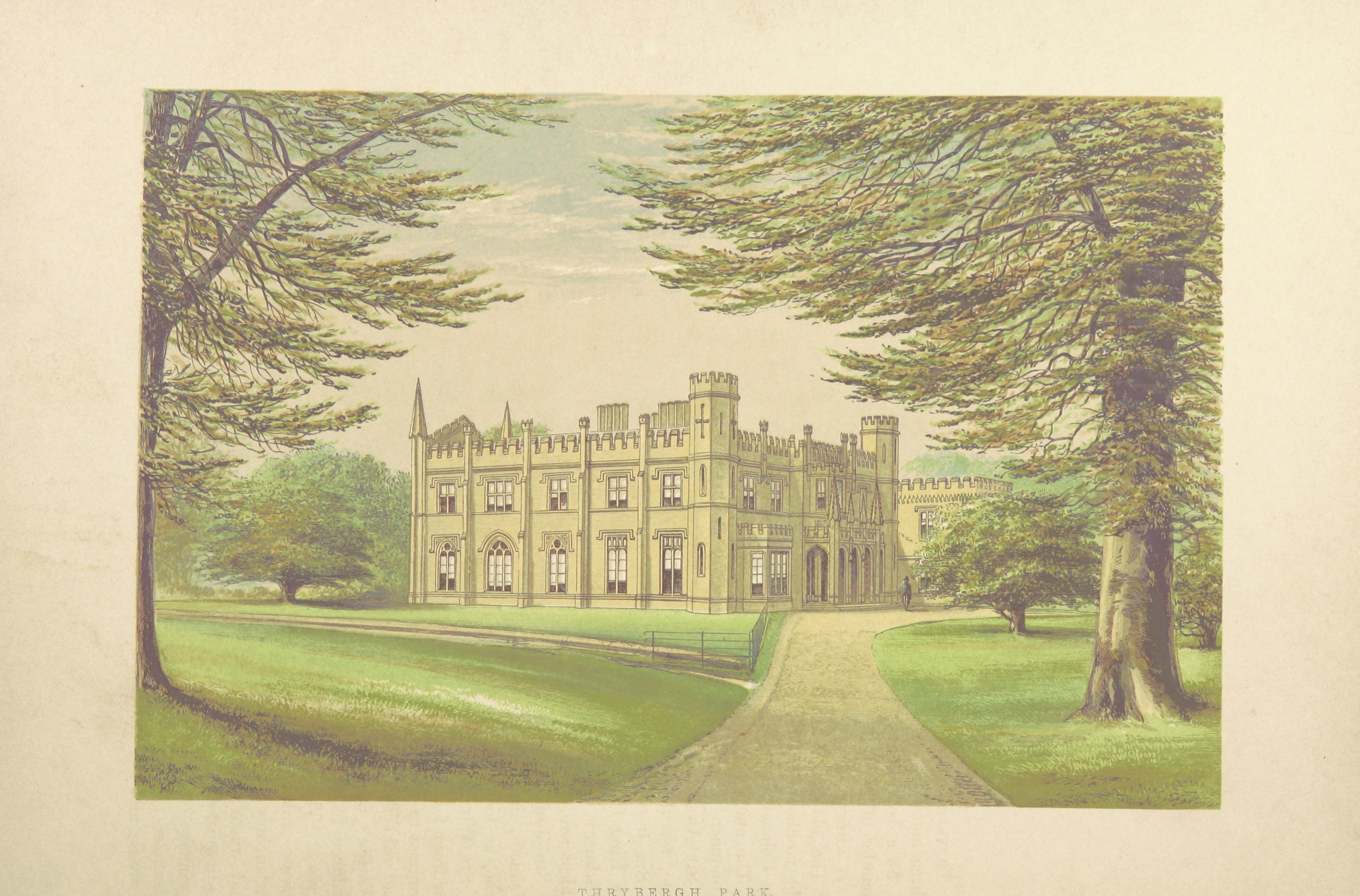
Thrybergh Park country house

To the north west of the village is Thrybergh Park, in which is situated a grade II listed country house, built around 1820 by John Webb. The house is built of ashlar sandstone, with a roof of Welsh slate. The main section has two storeys and is of square appearance, with five bays on all sides, build in Tudor revival style with some Gothic Revival detailing. There is a low three-storey tower, and the house was commissioned by Colonel Fullerton. The building is now used as the club house for Rotherham Golf Club, which was formed in 1903.

The park is home to Rotherham Golf Course, which, in the past used to hold famous tournaments. Par for the 6,327-yard (5,785 m) course is 70. Simon Coumbe of Pontefract Golf Club holds the course record with a score of 62, which he achieved in September 2005 during the second round of the inaugural Lee Westwood Trophy. He broke the previous record of 65, which was held jointly by Lee Westwood and Ian Garbutt.

Thrybergh has one public house, The Lord Reresby. As well as this, other places include the Thrybergh Sports Centre now closed The Fosters Garden Centre and Fosters Petrol Station Now closed

Thrybergh Country Park is situated just outside the village.

== Notable people ==
Many people in public life and the world of entertainment have come from Thrybergh, or live there. These include:

- Admiral Sir John Fullerton (1840–1918), Royal Navy officer and courtier
- John Platt (sculptor) (1728–1810) English sculptor and builder
- Paul Shane (Actor and Comedian) lived in Thrybergh up his death in May 2013
- Alan Simpson (Olympian) who attended St Gerard's Catholic Primary School
- Ian Snodin former football player
- Glynn Snodin former football player
- Jackie Stamps former footballer. Scored two goals for Derby County in the 1946 FA Cup Final.

== Thrybergh tip ==
During the Second World War, Sheffield Corporation realised that the tip they were using at Kilnhurst for the dumping of sewage sludge was nearly full, and so bought land on which to establish a new tip beside the railway line that ran to Silverwood Colliery. Tenders for the supply of railway tracks were let in March 1946, while concrete boundary posts and fencing were erected by Tarmac Limited. The first trains of waste from Blackburn Meadows sewage treatment works to the Thrybergh tip began arriving in January 1948.

The railway installation consisted of two sidings, forming a passing loop, with temporary trackwork laid beyond that to reach the tipping point. Trains of wooden wagons were delivered to one siding, and each was then lowered to the end of the tipping track on a cable, emptied, and then hauled back to the other siding by a David Brown tractor. The wooden wagons were replaced by steel ones in 1958, and a dragline mechanical excavator was supplied by Thomas Smith & Sons of Rodley two years later. The tractor was replaced by a diesel hydraulic locomotive in 1962. This had been built as an 0–4–0 saddle tank steam engine in 1918 by Peckett and Sons of Bristol, but was converted when the Blackburn Meadows works acquired two diesel electric shunters. The work was undertaken by staff at Blackburn Meadows, who removed the water tank and boiler, and fitted a Perkins 4-cylinder engine extracted from a crane which was by then redundant. The result was of unusual appearance, but proved to be efficient and trouble-free. It was returned to Blackburn Meadows in 1967, and was cut up for scrap soon afterwards.

Two train movements a day occurred five days a week, with a train of full wagons arriving, and a train of empties departing. Each train consisted of between 32 and 34 wagons, and no trains were normally run on Sundays or Mondays. The tipping of sewage sludge ceased in 1969, when Blackburn Meadows was upgraded to include an incinerator, but the use of the tip did not cease, as it was used from March 1969 for dumping burnt ash from the incinerator. This task, which included maintaining the tip, was put out to contract, and was initially won by XRE Transport Ltd.

== See also ==
- Listed buildings in Thrybergh

== Sources ==
- Booth, A. J. (1986). "Sheffield's Sewage Works Railways". Industrial Railway Record. Industrial Railway Society. ISSN 0537-5347.
