= Kilnhurst =

Village in South Yorkshire, England

Coordinates: 53.470339°N 1.305744°W

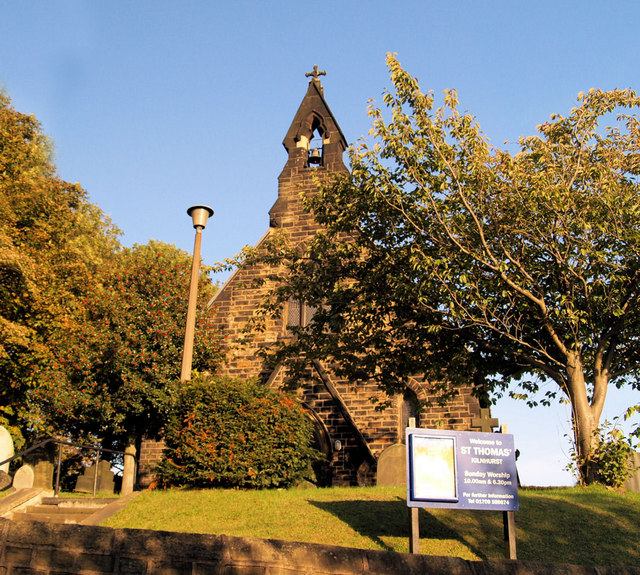
- St Thomas's church

- Location within South Yorkshire
- Population: 2,775
- OS grid reference: SK468976
- Metropolitan borough: Rotherham
- Metropolitan county: South Yorkshire
- Region: Yorkshire and the Humber
- Country: England
- Sovereign state: United Kingdom
- Post town: Mexborough
- Postcode district: S64
- Dialling code: 01709
- Police: South Yorkshire
- Fire: South Yorkshire
- Ambulance: Yorkshire
- UK Parliament: Wentworth and Dearne

Kilnhurst is a village in South Yorkshire, England, on the banks of the River Don and the Sheffield and South Yorkshire Navigation. It grew up around the coal mining, ceramics, glass, brick-making and locomotive industries; none of these industries remain in the village.

== Residents ==
The sculptor Charles Sargeant Jagger was born in the village in 1885, followed by his painter brother David in 1891. They were the sons of a colliery manager. Charles was famous for a number of war memorials commemorating the First World War, such as the Royal Artillery Memorial (1925) which stands at Hyde Park Corner in London, while David was famous for his portrait of Robert Baden-Powell.

== Railways ==
Until the 1960s the village had two railway stations, Kilnhurst Central built by the Manchester, Sheffield & Lincolnshire Railway on the line from Sheffield Victoria to Doncaster, and Kilnhurst West built by the Midland Railway, on the line from Sheffield Midland to Cudworth and Leeds. Both have since closed, though the lines still operate, allowing for hopes that a station may one day be reopened.

Residents now rely on Stagecoach Yorkshire buses to go to Rotherham Interchange, Mexborough, Barnsley Interchange, or Swinton railway station for journeys to Sheffield, Meadowhall Interchange or Doncaster.

== Kilnhurst tip ==
To the south of the village, on an area sandwiched between the two railway lines that served the village, the Sheffield City sewage department ran a tip between 1892 and 1959, which was used to dump sewage sludge from the Blackburn Meadows sewage treatment works at Tinsley. Sheffield council negotiated with the Manchester, Sheffield & Lincolnshire Railway Company, who built a junction close to Kilnhurst Hall farm, together with signals and locking gear to ensure its safe operation. The council paid £600 to the railway company for this work, on the basis that any difference between this and the actual cost would be paid or refunded as appropriate. The railway company also agreed that they would maintain the tracks, but would invoice the cost of such maintenance to Sheffield. The agreement was made on 13 May 1892, and the tip was operational later that year. 22.75 acres (9.21 ha) of land were initially rented, half from Mr. J. Fullerton, and the other half from Bentley's farm. Fullerton's land was bought for £175 per acre in 1900, and the farm's land was later bought for £150 per acre. Sewage trains, consisting of wooden wagons owned by the Blackburn Meadows works, would arrive at the tip, and be reversed into a siding. Wagons would run along a length of temporary track by gravity, until they arrived at the tipping point, where they would be emptied. The empty wagons would then be pulled back to the siding by a horse. The temporary tracks were moved as required so that they remained near the edge of the tip. In 1906, horses were costed at £130, wages for the men operating the tip came to £748 15s 2d (£748.76) and £89 2s 6d (£89.13) was paid in sidings charges. The fleet of 75 wagons delivered 50,622 tons of sludge to the tip. Mr. A. Bentley of Thrybergh Farm, Kilnhurst, was responsible for supplying the horses in 1910 but received a letter from Sheffield Corporation asking that he supply a more suitable horse than the brown one then in use, as it appeared too weak for the work. They also pointed out that its coat was not in a very clean condition, as they suspected that Bentley would not have noticed this.

There were complaints from councillors in the Kilnhurst area about the smell and the dangers to health. John Haworth, who was the works manager at Blackburn Meadows in 1905, pointed out that the Rawmarsh sewage treatment works was a significant contributor to bad smells. Councillor Spick from Rawmarsh led a vigorous campaign against the tip in 1906 and attempted to inspect the tip on 5 September 1906 with a group of representatives from Swinton. However, Haworth refused them admission, as they had not made any arrangements in advance, and the Mexborough and Swinton Times reported the events but generally found in favour of Sheffield Corporation. Legal action was considered in 1907, but Spick was advised that there was no real case. The matter was laid to rest after a series of jovial exchanges in the council. Sheffield worked hard to ensure that the tip was not a nuisance, and exchanges between Rawmarsh and Sheffield councils became much more amiable.

One train of empty wagons left the tip each day, and another of full wagons arrived, according to the Great Central Railway's 1922 timetable. By 1939, three railway lines left the sidings and ran across the tip. However, the tip was becoming full, and Sheffield Council bought land at Thrybergh in 1946 to create a new tip. That opened in January 1948, after which regular tipping at Kilnhurst stopped, by which time 2,917,480 tons of sewage sludge had been tipped at the site. It continued to be used irregularly until 1959, when the railway siding was removed, and the land was sold to the National Coal Board in 1961.

== Kilnhurst Ings Nature Reserve ==
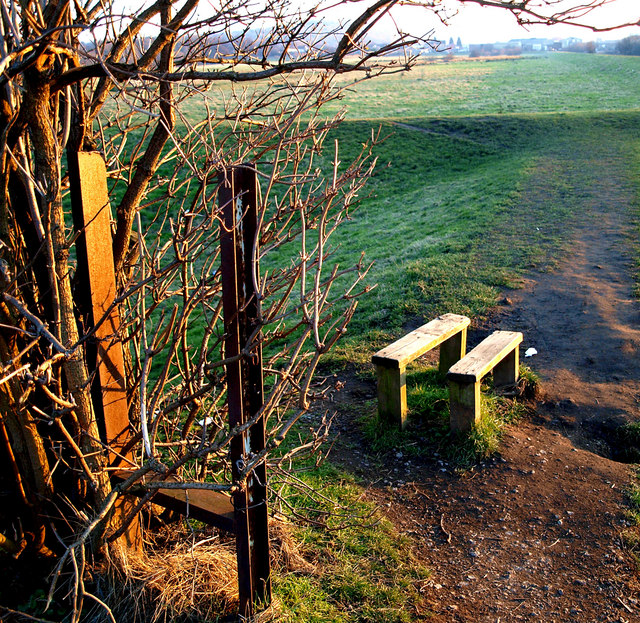
Kilnhurst Ings showing the embankment designed to contain the washland during periods of high water on the Don

Kilnhurst Ings is a post industual washland adjacent to the River Don. The Wildlife Trust for Sheffield and Rotherham has created a series of ditches and shallow ponds in order to encourage aquatic insects, voles, waterfowl and wading birds. This has improved the biodiversity of the area, with meadow and aquatic plants now established. Black-tailed skimmer dragonfly and snipe have been sighted in the reserve. Seasonal grazing takes place from April to October. Over 90 species of birds have been seen on the ings.

== See also ==
- List of closed railway stations in Britain
