= Greasbrough Canal =

Canal in South Yorkshire, England

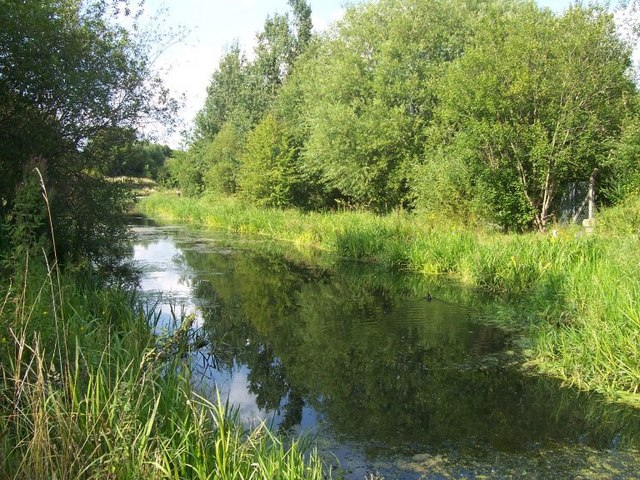
- The canal above the A633 culvert

Specifications
- Locks: 4
- Status: part extant

History
- Date of act: Privately built
- Date of first use: 1780
- Date closed: 1918

Geography
- Start point: Greasbrough
- End point: Rotherham
- Connects to: River Don Navigation

The Greasbrough Canal was a private canal built by the Marquess of Rockingham to serve his coal mining interests in and around the village of Greasbrough, near Rotherham, South Yorkshire, England. It opened in 1780, and the Newbiggin branch was built some time later. The main line to Greasbrough closed in 1840 with the coming of the Sheffield and Rotherham Railway, and the canal ceased to carry commercial traffic during the First World War. Most of it has been filled in, but a small section near the River Don Navigation remains in water.

== History ==
Collieries to the south of Wentworth Park and near Bassingthorpe had been connected to the River Don Navigation by a waggonway, which had been completed by 1762. In order to improve transport of the coal, the Marquess of Rockingham asked John Varley to survey a route from the Don to either Cinder Bridge or Sough Bridge near Greasbrough. Varley was an assistant to the canal engineer James Brindley. Varley's proposal was for a 1.5-mile (2.4 km) canal, which would require three locks, as there was a fall of around 25 feet (7.6 m) over the route. His survey, which is in the Sheffield Archives Office, was judged to be good by the engineer John Smeaton, but he thought that the scheme lacked an adequate water supply. No action was taken, and Smeaton was asked to re-survey the route in 1775. He suggested using five locks, rather than three, and estimated the cost of the project to be £5,952, which included £2,500 for the locks. Again, no action was taken, but a third survey was commissioned in 1778, this time by William Fairbank. The engineer William Jessop was then asked to construct the canal. He reduced the number of locks to four, and included a reservoir for water supply. Work began in 1779, and was probably completed the following year. Cinder Bridge was the main terminus, but Sough Bridge was served by a short branch. Tramways connected the canal to the collieries, which were leased from the Marquess by the Fentons.

The canal, when opened in 1780, left the River Don Navigation above Eastwood lock, and passed under the road to Rawmarsh, to reach a terminal from where the coal was loaded, on the eastern side of the village of Greasbrough. This section was just under 1.5 miles (2.4 km) in length. A short branch, around 500 yards (460 m) in length, left this canal and, travelling in a north-easterly direction, terminated by Taylors Lane at Parkgate, near to its junction with School Road. Here it met with tramways from New Park Colliery, Swallow Wood Colliery and other coal interests in and near Rawmarsh. From 1823 one side of the canal at this point faced on to the newly opened works of the Park Gate Iron Company. The branch is sometimes known as the Newbiggin Branch.

== Operation and demise ==
Traffic figures for 1834 included 10,452 tons of coal, which originated from Earl Fitzwilliam's colliery at Park Gate, and passed on to the Sheffield Canal. A system of containers was used, where coal was loaded into them in the colliery, and they were then loaded into boats, which could hold around 30 tons. A horse was used to work a train of three such boats. The demise of the canal was rapid, as the Sheffield and Rotherham Railway obtained an act of Parliament in 1836 which allowed them to build a branch to the canal. The branch was completed and opened on 7 August 1839, linking the Sheffield and Rotherham main line at Holmes to the tramways serving the canal. This made it possible to transport Earl Fitzwilliam's coal to Sheffield without the use of the canal system, thus breaking the near monopoly of the Duke of Norfolk in the supply of coal to Sheffield. The tramroads feeding the upper canal were disused by 1840, and much of the main line of the canal was built over to form what is known as the Coach Road soon afterwards. The Newbiggin Colliery branch closed in the late nineteenth century, whilst the lower portion, which still exists, was not used by commercial traffic after the end of the First World War. The last boat to use it is thought to be a barge owned by Waddington's, which used the dry dock at Park Gate in 1928.

The entry to the canal, after the construction of the Manchester, Sheffield and Lincolnshire Railway line from Mexborough to Rotherham in the 1860s, was controlled initially by a flagman and later by a small almost square hipped roof signal box, named Parkgate, which was itself replaced in the first decade of the 20th century by a new box a short distance further west named Rotherham Road.

== Route ==
The entrance to the canal from the Eastwood Cut is still clearly visible, although both the towpath swing bridge and the railway swing bridge has been replaced by fixed structures. Just beyond that, the A633 road has been widened, and the canal is culverted under the embankment. A little further to the north, the Sheffield and Rotherham Railway was at a higher level, and the fixed bridge remains. The 1892 Ordnance Survey map shows a coal wharf immediately after the bridge, and then a boat building yard, with the swing bridge over the entrance channel. The canal is in water to a point somewhere near where the main line and the Newbiggin branch diverged. Railway sidings crossed the Newbiggin branch on a swing bridge to reach the Park Gate Iron Works, and the canal crossed under the railway just beyond the works, to reach some lime kilns. There is no evidence of the original main line on the 1892 map, although it ran broadly parallel to the stream which runs from the bottom of Mill Dam at Greasbrough.

== Points of interest ==
Point	Coordinates (Links to map resources)	OS Grid Ref	Notes
Jn with River Don	53.4414°N 1.3488°W	SK433940	
Sheffield and Rotherham Railway bridge	53.4443°N 1.3502°W	SK432943	
End of watered section	53.4468°N 1.3491°W	SK433946	Newbiggin junction
End of Newbiggin branch	53.4523°N 1.3473°W	SK434952	
Cinder Bridge	53.4575°N 1.3659°W	SK422958	Main line terminus

== Bibliography ==
- Drake, James (1840). "Drake's Road Book of the Sheffield and Rotherham Railway". Haywood and Moore.
- Hadfield, Charles (1972). The Canals of Yorkshire and North East England (Vol 1). David and Charles. ISBN 978-0-7153-5719-4.
- Hadfield, Charles (1973). The Canals of Yorkshire and North East England (Vol 2). David and Charles. ISBN 978-0-7153-5975-4.
- Skempton, Sir Alec; et al. (2002). A Biographical Dictionary of Civil Engineers in Great Britain and Ireland: Vol 1: 1500 to 1830. Thomas Telford. ISBN 978-0-7277-2939-2.
- Records of the Fitzwilliam Estate
- "Forward": the journal of the Great Central Railway Society
- "Great Central Railway Signal Boxes" Compiled from the 1904 Appendix by Roger Milnes, published by the Sheffield (GCRS) Group, 1994
