= Parkgate and Rawmarsh railway station =

Disused railway station in South Yorkshire, England

Parkgate and Rawmarsh
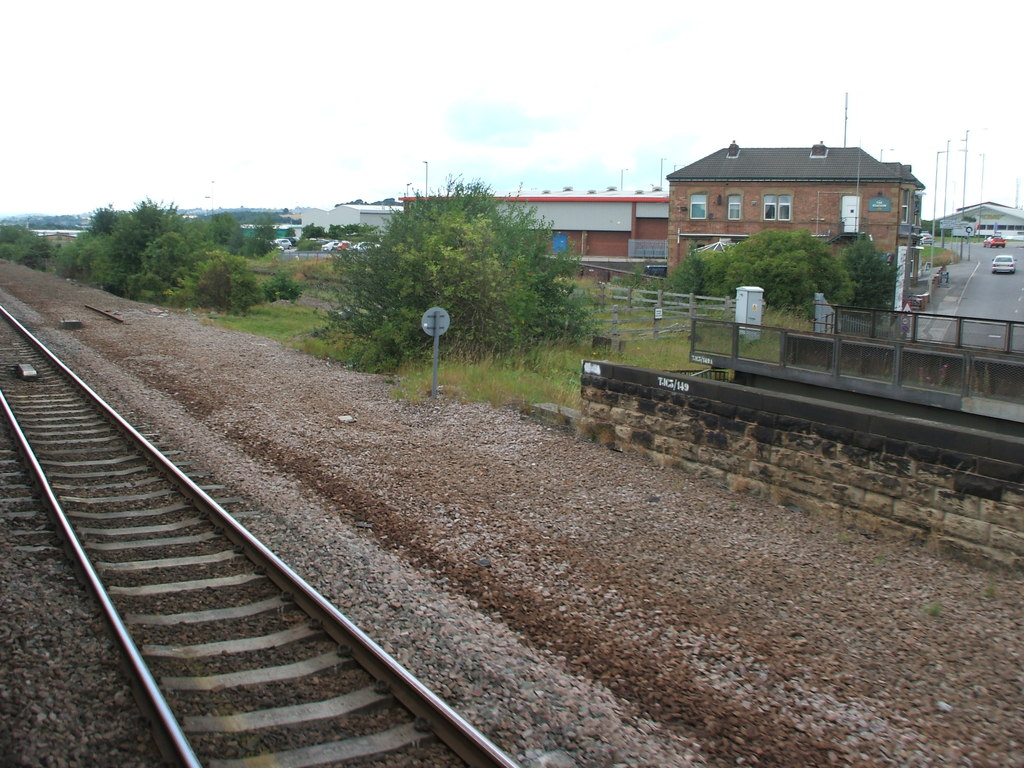
- Site of the former station (2008)

General information
- Location: Parkgate, Metropolitan Borough of Rotherham; England
- Coordinates: 53.449890°N 1.337250°W
- Grid reference: SK441949

Other information
- Status: Disused

History
- Original company: Midland Railway
- Post-grouping: London, Midland and Scottish Railway

Key dates
- 1 May 1853: Station opened as Rawmarsh
- 1 November 1869: renamed Rawmarsh and Park Gate
- 1 December 1869: renamed Park Gate and Rawmarsh
- 3 May 1894: renamed Parkgate and Rawmarsh
- 1 January 1968: Station closed
Location

Parkgate and Rawmarsh railway station, originally named Rawmarsh was situated in Parkgate, adjacent to the Park Gate Iron and Steel Company's works. It served the communities of Parkgate and Rawmarsh, in South Yorkshire, England.

The station was situated on the former North Midland Railway between Kilnhurst West and Rotherham Masborough.

On 19 November 1926, nine people were killed in a train derailment caused when a private owner wagon disintegrated. A signal post was partially brought down, obstructing an adjacent line, and the express passenger train had the sides of its carriages ripped open by the signal post.

The station was closed, along with all the others on the line, except for Rotherham Masborough on 1 January 1968. The last ticket to be issued, as a souvenir, was lettered L.M.S.R., 20 years after that company's demise.

The station and the adjoining steel works, together with other locations in the Rotherham area, were featured in the 1958 film Tread Softly Stranger starring Diana Dors. Diana Dors's co-star George Baker is seen arriving at platform 1 of "Rawborough" station.

Preceding station	Disused railways	Following station
Rotherham Masborough	Eastern Region of British Railways; Midland Railway; Sheffield-Cudworth-Leeds Line	Kilnhurst West
