= Parkgate, South Yorkshire =

Suburb of Rotherham, South Yorkshire, England

Coordinates: 53.451°N 1.342°W

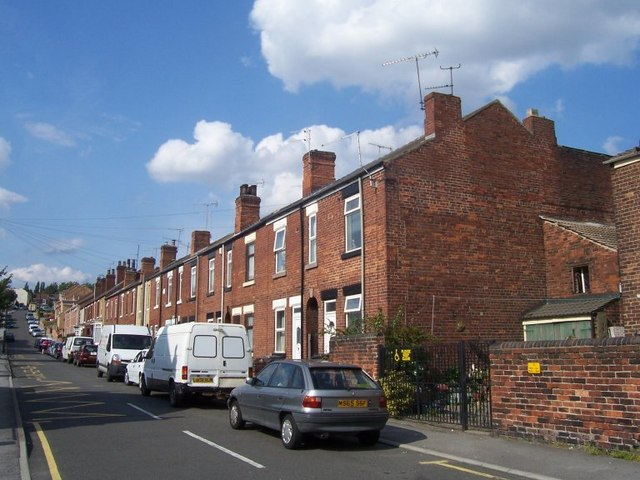
Ashwood Road, Parkgate

Parkgate is a suburb of Rotherham, South Yorkshire, England. It has since been consumed by its neighbour, Rawmarsh and is in the ward of Rawmarsh from which it has been indistinguishable since the early 20th century.

== Toponymy ==
Its name is believed to come from its position at the far end of the parkland belonging to Wentworth Woodhouse. Although it marks the old entry gates of the parkland, the Wentworth estate stretched far past it, encompassing 90,000 acres of what was beautiful English countryside. The area gives its name to the Parkgate Seam, important in the South Yorkshire Coalfield.

== Economy ==
Parkgate is near the location of the Park Gate Iron and Steel Company.

It is also home to the Parkgate Shopping Outlet.

== Transport ==
=== Roads ===
The A633 runs through Parkgate.

=== Rail ===
The area was served by Parkgate and Rawmarsh railway station, originally named Rawmarsh which was situated in Parkgate, adjacent to the Park Gate Iron and Steel Company's works. It was constructed by the North Midland Railway and opened in 1840. The station was closed on 1 January 1968.

The area was also served by Parkgate and Aldwarke railway station which was opened in July 1873 by the Manchester, Sheffield and Lincolnshire Railway company. The station was originally known as "Aldwarke". The station was closed to passengers on 29 October 1951.

The nearest rail station now is Rotherham Central.

=== Tram-train ===
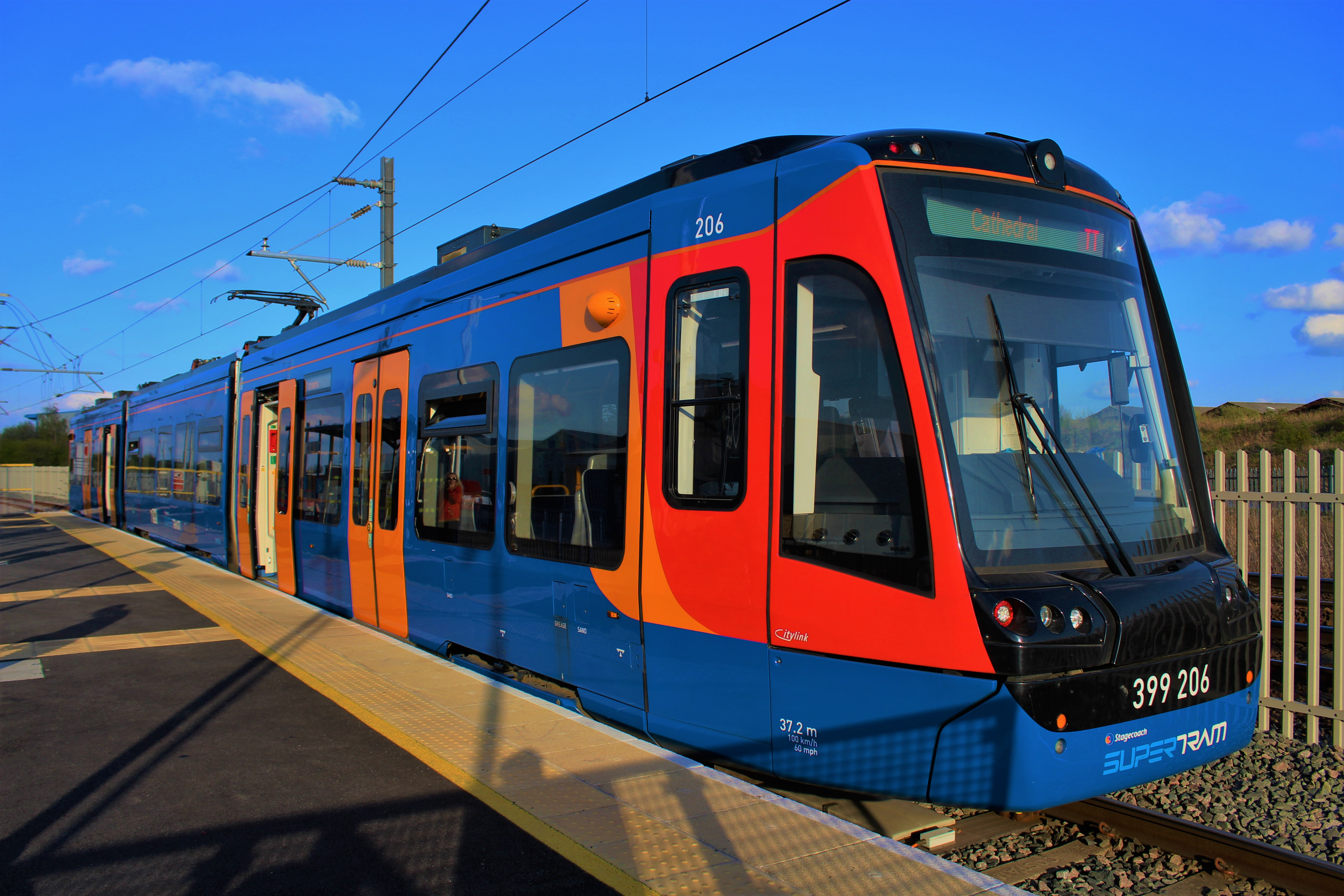
Sheffield Supertram Tram-Train unit at Parkgate tram stop

In August 2008, plans were announced for an extension to Sheffield Supertram to Rotherham Central station. In September 2009, it was decided that the extension would terminate at Parkgate Shopping Centre. The proposed route was initially expected to be operational by 2015, later pushed to May 2018, and finally opened on 25 October 2018—only to be temporarily shut down the same day due to a collision with a lorry. The motive power is a fleet of seven Vossloh Citylink Class 399 tram-trains, which are specially equipped to operate on both tram and mainline railways, with a service frequency of three trains per hour.

=== Canals ===
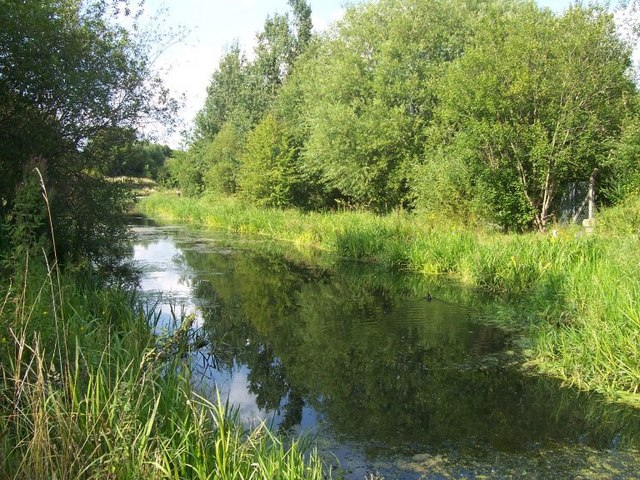
Greasbrough canal below the A633 culvert

The Greasbrough Canal, also known as Earl Fitzwilliam's Canal, joins the River Don Navigation at Parkgate. Both are part of the Sheffield and South Yorkshire Navigation.

== Cultural references ==
Parkgate pumping station is a Newcomen engine house, built circa 1823. The building is intact and houses an electric pump.

Parkgate and Rawmarsh railway station and the adjoining steel works, together with other locations in the Rotherham area, were featured in the 1958 film Tread Softly Stranger starring Diana Dors. Diana Dors's co-star George Baker is seen arriving at platform 1 of "Rawborough" station.

== Sport ==
There is a football club, Parkgate F.C., based in the suburb, and the defunct clubs Parkgate & Rawmarsh United, Parkgate Works Sports and Parkgate Welfare F.C. was also prominent.
