= River Don Navigation =

Waterway navigation in South Yorkshire, England

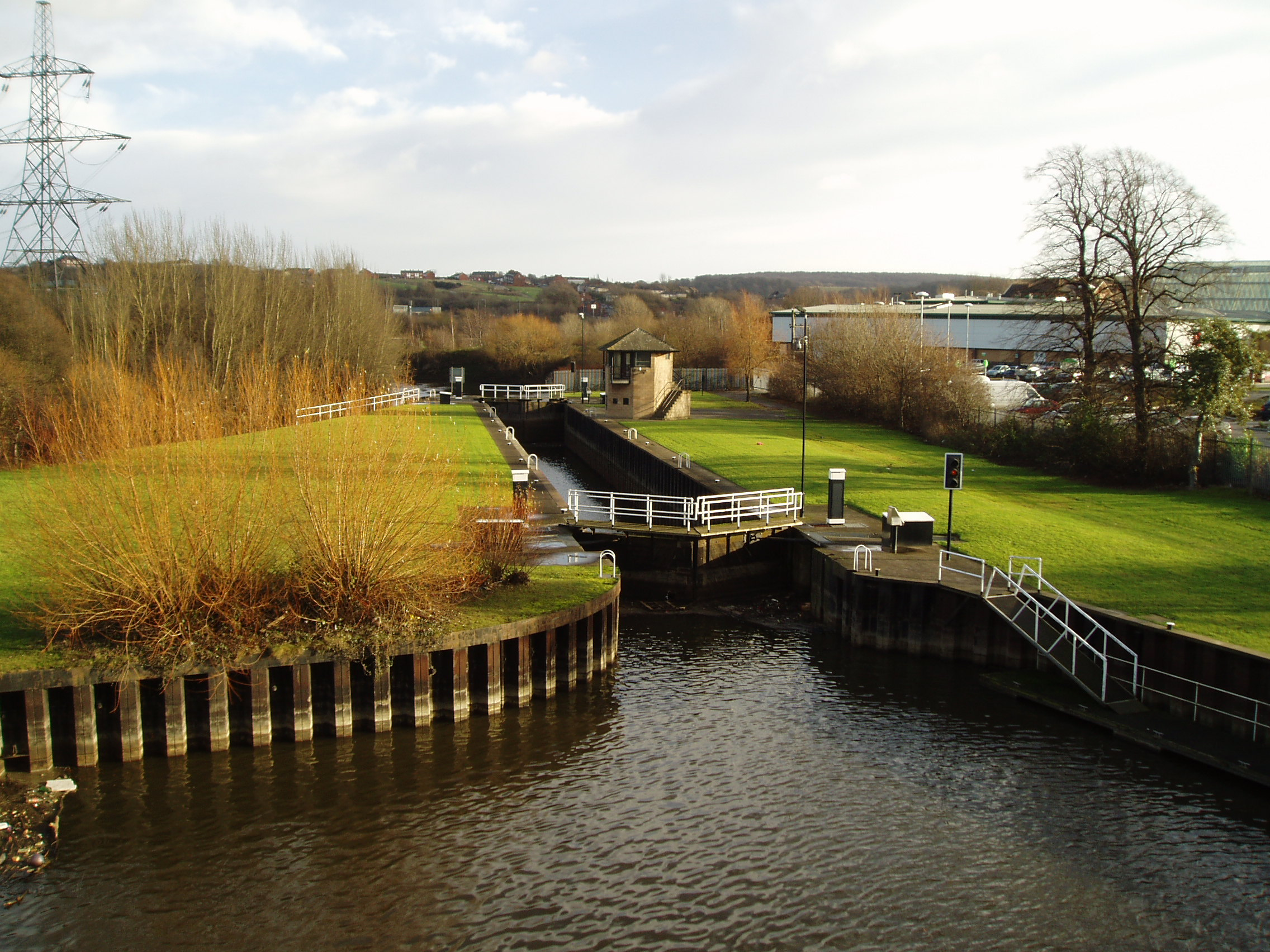
- The Aldwarke Eurobarge Lock, complete with traffic lights

Specifications
- Maximum boat length: 229 ft 8 in (70.00 m) (originally 62 ft 0 in or 18.90 m)
- Maximum boat beam: 20 ft 0 in (6.10 m) (originally 16 ft 0 in or 4.88 m)
- Locks: 13
- Status: Navigable
- Navigation authority: Canal & River Trust

History
- Original owner: River Don Navigation Co
- Date of act: 1726
- Date completed: 1751

Geography
- Start point: Tinsley, Sheffield
- End point: Bramwith
- Connects to: New Junction Canal, Stainforth and Keadby Canal, Sheffield Canal

The River Don Navigation was the result of early efforts to make the River Don in South Yorkshire, England, navigable between Fishlake and Sheffield. The Dutch engineer Cornelius Vermuyden had re-routed the mouth of the river in 1626, to improve drainage, and the new works included provision for navigation, but the scheme did not solve the problem of flooding, and the Dutch River was cut in 1635 to link the new channel to Goole. The first act of Parliament to improve navigation on the river was obtained in 1726, by a group of Cutlers based in Sheffield; the Corporation of Doncaster obtained another act of Parliament in the following year for improvements to the lower river. Locks and lock cuts were built and by 1751 the river was navigable to Tinsley.

The network was expanded by the opening of the Stainforth and Keadby Canal in 1802, linking to the River Trent, the Dearne and Dove Canal in 1804, linking to Barnsley, and the Sheffield Canal in 1819, which provided better access to Sheffield. All three were bought out by the Don Navigation in the 1840s, after which the canals were owned by a series of railway companies. The Sheffield and South Yorkshire Navigation Company was created in 1889 and eventually succeeded in buying back the canals and the Don Navigation in 1895, but plans for expansion were hampered by a lack of capital. One success was the opening of the New Junction Canal in 1905, jointly funded with the Aire and Calder Navigation.

During the 20th century, there were several plans to upgrade the Don, to handle larger craft. It was eventually upgraded to take 700-tonne barges in 1983, but the scheme was a little too late, as an anticipated rise in commercial traffic did not occur. Most use of the navigation is now by leisure boaters, whose boats are dwarfed by the huge locks. The navigation and river are crossed by a wide variety of bridges, from a medieval bridge complete with a chapel on it, one of only three to have survived in Britain, to a motorway viaduct that pioneered the use of rubber bearings and a new waterproofing system. In between are a number of railway bridges, including two that were built to carry the internal railway system at the Blackburn Meadows sewage treatment plant. The former railway viaduct at Conisbrough now carries cyclists 113 feet (34 m) above the Don, as part of the National Cycle Network.

The final section to Bramwith is known as the River Dun Navigation.

== Early history ==
Before 1626 the River Don had two outlets, an eastern branch that meandered across Hatfield Chase to enter the River Trent, and a northern branch, which was a Roman navigation channel, and joined the River Aire at Turnbridge, near East Cowick. Cornelius Vermuyden's drainage scheme for Hatfield Chase, begun in 1626 and largely completed by 1628, included the construction of Ashfield Bank, which ran for 2 miles (3.2 km) along the southern bank of the Don from Fishlake to Thorne, cutting off the eastern branch. Navigation to Sandtoft was made possible by the provision of a navigable sluice in the bank, which had lifting gates and a 50-by-15-foot (15.2 by 4.6 m) lock chamber. A further bank some distance to the east of the northern channel ran for 5 miles (8 km) from Thorne to Turnbridge to provide washlands, which would flood when high levels in the Aire prevented the Don discharging into it.

In the winter of 1628, there was flooding at Fishlake and Sykehouse, which was followed by rioting. A navigable sluice was built at Turnbridge in 1629, with a lock 60 by 18 feet (18.3 by 5.5 m), and an outfall sluice called the "Great Sluice" was completed in 1630, probably by Hugo Spiering, who had assisted Vermuyden with the main project. Continued problems with flooding led to the construction of a 5-mile (8 km) channel from Newbridge near Thorne eastwards to Goole, where water levels in the Ouse were between 5 and 10 feet (1.5 and 3.0 m) lower than at Turnbridge. The channel, called the Dutch River, ended in another outfall sluice, and was completed in 1635 at a cost of £33,000. Boats continued to use the lock at Turnbridge. In about 1688 the Goole sluice was washed away by a flood, and was never replaced. The tidal scour widened the channel, and barges of up to 30 tonnes could normally reach Fishlake, and often Wilsick House, in Barnby Dun. Smaller boats could reach Doncaster for most of the year, and large barges could do so when there was a flood tide.

Initial attempts to seek powers to make the River Don navigable were hampered by opposition from local landowners and disunity between the authorities in Sheffield, Rotherham and Doncaster. The first bill to try to obtain an act of Parliament was presented in 1698 by the MP for Thirsk, Sir Godfrey Copley of Sprotborough, representing the interests of Rotherham. Although there was support from the "gentlemen, traders and inhabitants" of Doncaster, the corporation opposed the bill in view of the likely impact on their mills. There was no support from Sheffield either, and the bill failed at its first reading. In 1704 Doncaster Corporation, with the support of its traders, presented a bill that received a first reading, but disappeared without a second reading ever happening. By 1722 there was some agreement between Sheffield and Doncaster, with a tacit agreement that Doncaster would be responsible for the river below their town, and Sheffield for the section above Doncaster. There was organised resistance to the scheme from local landowners, and it appears that their influence resulted in the proposed bill being defeated in committee, so it could not be presented to Parliament.

River Dun Navigation Act 1725
- Act of Parliament
- Parliament of Great Britain
- Long title: An Act for making the River Dun, in the West Riding of the County of York, navigable, from Holmstile, to Doncaster, up to the utmost Extent of Tinsley, Westward, a Township within Two Miles of Sheffield.
- Citation: 12 Geo. 1. c. 38
- Territorial extent: Great Britain

Dates
- Royal assent: 24 May 1726
- Commencement: 20 January 1726 (Note: Start of session.)
Other legislation
Amended by	River Dun Navigation Act 1726; River Dun Navigation Act 1732; River Dun Navigation Act 1739

Status: Amended

Text of statute as originally enacted

However, in 1726 Sheffield's Company of Cutlers sought powers from Parliament to make the river navigable from Holmstile in Doncaster to Tinsley, on the edge of Sheffield. Terminating at Tinsley placated the Duke of Norfolk, who represented the opposition from Sheffield, and a great deal of work had been done to reduce the opposition from landowners. The River Dun Navigation Act 1725 (12 Geo. 1. c. 38) was passed on 24 May 1726 giving the Cutlers powers to make cuts and to make the river deeper and wider so that boats of 20 tons could reach Tinsley. There were a number of restrictions, intended to protect existing water-powered installations. Lord Frederick Howard's mills at Rotherham, Kilnhurst forge, Thrybergh dam and Sprotborough mills and water engine were specifically mentioned.

River Dun Navigation Act 1726
- Act of Parliament
- Parliament of Great Britain
- Long title: An Act for improving the Navigation of the River Dunn, from a Place called Holmestile, in the Township of Doncaster, in the County of York, to Wilsick House, in the Parish of Barmby Dunn, in the said County.
- Citation: 13 Geo. 1. c. 20
- Territorial extent: Great Britain

Dates
- Royal assent: 24 April 1727
- Commencement: 17 January 1727
Other legislation
Amends	River Dun Navigation Act 1725
Amended by	River Dun Navigation Act 1732; River Dun Navigation Act 1739; South Yorkshire, Doncaster and Goole Railway Act 1847; Stainforth and Keadby Canal Purchase Act 1849; Tinsley and Doncaster Turnpike Road Extension Act 1849; South Yorkshire Railway and River Dun Company Act 1850

Status: Amended

Text of statute as originally enacted

The Corporation of Doncaster sought powers in 1727 to improve the river below Holmstile, as far as Wilsick House in Barnby Dun. The bill passed through Parliament uneventfully as the River Dun Navigation Act 1726 (13 Geo. 1. c. 20), and again included detailed restrictions on what could and could not be done, designed to protect the landowners. The details were very specific in that they included the permissible heights of dams, the maximum length of cuts, and many other details of the work to be carried out.

River Dun Navigation Act 1732
- Act of Parliament
- Parliament of Great Britain
- Long title: An Act to explain and amend Two Acts of Parliament, One made in the Twelfth, and the other in the Thirteenth, Year of His late Majesty's Reign, for making navigable the River Dun, in the County of York; and for the better persecting and maintaining the said Navigation; and for uniting the several Proprietors thereof into One Company.
- Citation: 6 Geo. 2. c. 9
- Territorial extent: Great Britain

Dates
- Royal assent: 21 March 1733
- Commencement: 24 June 1733 (Note: Section 1.)
Other legislation
Amends	River Dun Navigation Act 1725; River Dun Navigation Act 1726
Amended by	River Dun Navigation Act 1739; South Yorkshire, Doncaster and Goole Railway Act 1847; Stainforth and Keadby Canal Purchase Act 1849; Tinsley and Doncaster Turnpike Road Extension Act 1849; South Yorkshire Railway and River Dun Company Act 1850

Status: Current legislation

Text of statute as originally enacted

Both acts were unusual in that they gave the bodies powers to borrow money, but did not create the companies to do the work. Nor were the financial arrangements clearly laid down, and both groups resorted to issuing shares to fund the improvements, although they were not actually empowered to do so. In October 1730, the two groups decided to amalgamate, but a 1731 bill to formalise the agreement and legalise the issuing of shares was defeated because it also included powers to make further changes to the river, including the section below Barnby Dun. Finally an act of Parliament of 1733, the River Dun Navigation Act 1732 (6 Geo. 2. c. 9), created the Company of the Proprietors of the Navigation of the River Don, with powers to create a new cut from Bromley Sands above Rotherham to Ickles Dam. The problems presented by the river below Wilsick House, including shallows and fords at Bramwith and Stainforth, and bridges on the Dutch River that were difficult to navigate, resulted in the proprietors trying again to obtain powers to improve the lower river in 1737, but again the petition was defeated in a parliamentary committee. Work continued, and it appears that Aldwarke was the head of navigation for some years, but Rotherham was reached in 1740.

River Dun Navigation Act 1739
- Act of Parliament
- Parliament of Great Britain
- Long title: An Act for the more effectual improving the Navigation of the River Dun, from a Place called Wilsick House, in the Parish of Barmby Dun, in the County of York, to Fishlock Ferry, in the same County.
- Citation: 13 Geo. 2. c. 11
- Territorial extent: Great Britain

Dates
- Royal assent: 19 March 1740
- Commencement: 15 November 1739
- Repealed: 28 July 1849
Other legislation
Amends	River Dun Navigation Act 1725; River Dun Navigation Act 1726; River Dun Navigation Act 1732
Repealed by	Tinsley and Doncaster Turnpike Road Extension Act 1849

Status: Current legislation

Text of statute as originally enacted

A further bill in 1740 sought powers to improve the river from Barnby Dun to Fishlake Ferry. Despite serious opposition, which included the merchants and traders of Doncaster as well as Doncaster Corporation, the bill was passed as the River Dun Navigation Act 1739 (13 Geo. 2. c. 11), giving the company new powers to make the river deeper and create a cut to avoid the shallows at Stainforth and Bramwith. Work on this northern section started almost immediately. The southern section to Tinsley was navigable by 1751, although the wharf and warehouse had not been completed by that date, and the towpath from Rotherham was not completed until 1822.

In 1737, the navigation was leased to three of the company shareholders for 14 years, and a new seven-year lease was made in 1751. After 1758, the company managed the navigation itself. Tolls for the next 10 years raised an average of £7,006 per annum, indicating healthy traffic levels.

== Expansion ==
The early 19th century saw the completion of a number of canals which linked to the Don. The first was the Stainforth and Keadby Canal, which had been proposed by the Don Navigation shareholders in 1792. Construction was started in 1793 and completed in 1802, with John Thompson, the engineer to the Don Navigation Company, overseeing the work until his death in 1795. It provided a link from Bramwith Lock to the River Trent, broadly following the old course of the River Don prior to Vermuyden's improvements. Two years later, the Dearne and Dove Canal opened, connecting with the Barnsley Canal near Barnsley. The canal had also been proposed by Don Navigation shareholders in 1792, and again John Thompson had overseen the initial construction. The third opening was in 1819, when the Sheffield Canal connected the Tinsley terminus to the centre of Sheffield. There were several plans to create a link to the Chesterfield Canal, including one in 1793 by Benjamin Outram, and a proposal by Richard Gresley in 1810 for a North East Junction Canal, which would have linked to the Don at Rotherham, broadly following the modern ideas for the Rother Link. Neither of these, nor a revival of the idea in 1832 gained sufficient support to proceed.

The company bought out the Dearne and Dove Canal in 1846, the Sheffield Canal in 1848, and the Stainforth and Keadby Canal in 1849. They then amalgamated with the South Yorkshire, Doncaster and Goole Railway in 1850, to become the South Yorkshire Railway and River Dun Company. This in turn was leased to the Manchester, Sheffield and Lincolnshire Railway in 1864. In order to allow an extension of the railway from Mexborough to Sheffield to pass under the railway line to Rotherham Westgate railway station, the Holmes cut below Ickles lock was diverted into the river, and the Eastwood cut below Rotherham lock was diverted to the east in 1864. The original bed was then filled in and the railway built along its course. Despite attempts to divert coal traffic to the railway, the canals maintained their traffic levels, carrying 982,000 tonnes in 1878 and 927,254 in 1888. However, there was dissatisfaction among users of the canals that the rates for traffic were higher than on the railways, and the canals were failing to modernise, as steam boats were banned, despite them having been in use for 50 years on the neighbouring Aire and Calder Navigation.

A plan to upgrade the waterways to allow the use of 300 to 500-tonne boats led to the formation of the Sheffield and South Yorkshire Canal Company Limited in November 1888. The cost of the scheme was estimated to be around £1 million, in addition to the cost of acquiring the canals from the railway company. The new company obtained an act of Parliament, the Sheffield and South Yorkshire Navigation Act 1889 (52 & 53 Vict. c. cxc) on 26 August 1889, creating the Sheffield and South Yorkshire Navigation Company, which was authorised to raise £1.5 million and to purchase the four canals either by negotiation, or by compulsory purchase if negotiations failed. The railway company was unwilling to sell, and it was not until 1895, after protracted negotiation and legal battles that the transfer was agreed. The navigation company had only succeeded in raising £625,000, which was less than the purchase price of the canals, and therefore the railway company nominated half of the ten directors, while the Aire and Calder Navigation Company declined to buy any shares because of railway influence. Many of the ambitious plans for the modernisation of the system were hindered by a lack of capital, although some further developments took place.

One improvement that was completed was the construction of the New Junction Canal. This had been authorised by an act of Parliament, the Aire and Calder and Diver Dun Navigation Junction Canal Act 1891 (54 & 55 Vict. c. clxx) obtained on 28 July 1891 by the Aire and Calder Navigation, which specified that the Sheffield and South Yorkshire Navigation Company would share the cost of construction and the ownership of the new waterway. No work could start until the company actually owned their canals, and they were required to raise £150,000 at a time when they had just failed to raise the finance for the takeover of the original canals. However, three-quarters of the cost had been raised by 1903. The new canal leaves the original navigation at Bramwith Junction, runs over the River Don on an aqueduct, and continues in a straight line for 5.5 miles (8.9 km), to join the Aire and Calder Navigation upstream from Goole. It provided a much more direct route from Sheffield to Goole, and was opened on 2 January 1905. The company had hoped to run compartment boats for the transport of coal along the canal, as the Aire and Calder did, but although straightening of the navigation was completed at Doncaster in April 1905 and at Sprotborough in late 1907, and Doncaster Town Lock was lengthened in 1909 and 1910, most of the locks could only hold three compartments at a time, and so there was little advantage to using this type of boat.

== Later developments ==
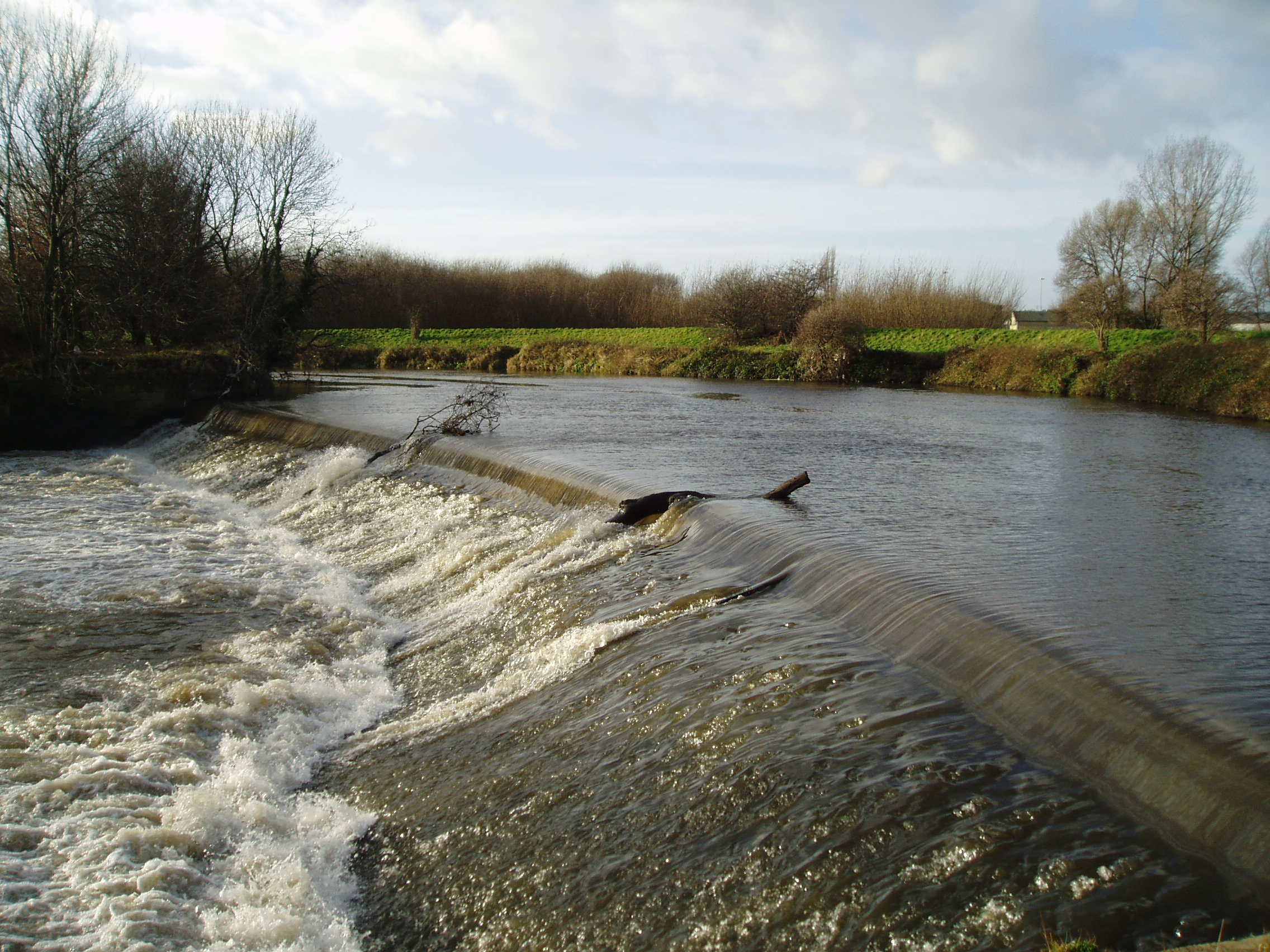
The weir near Aldwarke Lock

Towards the end of the First World War, Sheffield Corporation proposed a major upgrade of the navigation. They expected the government to nationalise the waterway, and pay for the improvements, to which they would contribute, providing that the railway influence was removed. The scheme involved deepening the channel from 6 feet (1.8 m) to 8 feet (2.4 m), and constructing 18 new locks which would be 270 by 22 feet (82.3 by 6.7 m), to replace the existing 62-by-16-foot (18.9 by 4.9 m) locks. The locks would have multiple gates, and be capable of holding four 110-tonne barges or one 300-tonne barge. The estimated cost was £1,483,426, but the government was unwilling to support the scheme, and Sheffield Corporation was not prepared to proceed without government backing.

During the inter-war years the navigation struggled to hold its own against competition from the railways and later the roads, and was affected by miners' strikes in the coal industry. Traffic was spasmodic, rising from 381,727 tonnes in 1926, the year of the general strike, to 815,329 tonnes in 1937, but much of the latter was short-haul traffic, rather than long-haul, and the revenues did not increase correspondingly. In an agreement with Hatfield Main Colliery and the Aire and Calder, Bramwith Lock on the Stainforth and Keadby Canal was lengthened in 1932, to allow compartment boats to be used for the coal traffic, while straightening of a stretch near Doncaster and the construction of a new warehouse and wharf were largely funded by Doncaster Corporation in 1934. Stainforth Side Lock, which allowed boats to access the lower River Don, was closed in 1939.

The major traffic on the navigation had always been coal, but after the Second World War there was a steady increase in oil traffic. By 1946, all of the mortgages that the company had used to fund expansion were repaid, and the financial position of the canal gradually improved. Control of the navigation, as with most British canals, passed to the British Transport Commission on 1 January 1948, under the terms of the Transport Act 1947 (10 & 11 Geo. 6. c. 49). Some improvements continued to be made, with two coal wharfs being built at Mexborough in 1954, to serve the new Doncaster power station, and Long Sandall Lock being extended to 215 by 22 feet (65.5 by 6.7 m). The new lock was opened on 10 July 1959, and allowed trains of 17 compartment boats to work through to Doncaster and Hexthorpe, as Doncaster Town Lock above it and Sykehouse Lock below it on the New Junction Canal were already of a similar size.

In 1961, the British Transport Commission, together with the British Iron and Steel Federation and Sheffield Chamber of Commerce considered plans to upgrade the navigation to handle 250-tonne barges, and work started on new wharfs and warehouses at Rotherham. Control of the navigation passed on again in 1963, this time to the British Waterways Board, who submitted a proposal to the government for a £2.5 million upgrade, covering the stretch from Bramwith to Rotherham. This would have involved the construction of ten new locks, each 225 by 25 feet (68.6 by 7.6 m), to replace the existing 12 locks. The new main line would then have been the same size as the Aire and Calder Navigation, although some of the bridges would have had less clearance. In 1972, a further proposal for a £2 million scheme to upgrade the waterway to handle 700-tonne barges up to Mexborough, and 400-tonne barges from there to Rotherham was submitted to the Department of the Environment.

Finally, the navigation was the subject of one of the last major attempts in the UK to attract commercial freight to the waterways. In 1983, it was upgraded to the 700-tonne Eurobarge standard by deepening the channels and enlarging the locks as far as Rotherham. Conisbrough lock was removed altogether, and the two Eastwood locks were combined into one. The new lock was initially named the Sir Frank Price Lock, after the chairman of the British Waterways Board who formally opened it on 1 June 1983. The expected rise in freight traffic did not occur, however. At Long Sandall, there used to be two locks side by side, and one of these still exists beside the new larger lock, allowing a comparison of their relative sizes to be made. The new lock has three sets of gates, and pleasure craft normally use the bottom and middle sets, while the original lock is used for moorings.

The new locks are 198 by 20 feet (60.4 by 6.1 m), and the navigation accommodates boats with a draught of 8.2 feet (2.5 m) and needing headroom of 10.5 feet (3.2 m). Beyond Rotherham, the locks are 70 by 15.1 feet (21.3 by 4.6 m), and so can accommodate a 70 feet (21 m) broad boat, but Rotherham lock is smaller, being only 61.5 feet (18.7 m) long, and so the upper reaches are effectively restricted to 60-foot (18 m) boats. Kilnhurst Lock and Doncaster Town Lock are both located at the head of a canal section of the navigation, and are used to regulate water levels within those sections. When not in use by boats, the paddles at both ends of the locks may be raised automatically to maintain water levels. When a boat needs to use the lock, the paddles close automatically before the normal operating procedure can be followed.

== Route ==
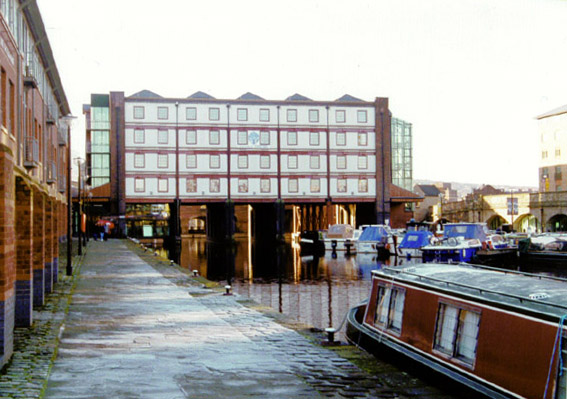
The Straddle Warehouse, Victoria Quays (formerly the Sheffield Basin), Sheffield City Centre

The River Don Navigation ended at Tinsley Wharf, but it forms a convenient place to start a description of the route. The wharf was on the river, just upstream from the present junction with the canal to Sheffield. It was close to the site of the Meadowhall Shopping Centre and the Tinsley Viaduct, which carries the M1 motorway over the valley of the River Don. From the junction there is a towpath along the canal to Victoria Quays (formerly Sheffield Basin) in Sheffield City Centre, or the Five Weirs Walk follows the course of the River Don to the same destination. The towpath extends to Rotherham in the opposite direction, passing the large Jordans Weir and the three locks on the Holmes Cut. Beside Jordans Weir is the outfall from Blackburn Meadows sewage treatment plant. In dry weather, this discharges 30 million gallons (136,000 m^{3}) of treated water each day, more than doubling the flow in the river.

The towpath continues to Rotherham Lock, where the Rotherham cut starts, but from there to Conisbrough the only way to see the navigation is from a boat or from one of the bridges which cross it. To the north of the cut are the remains of the Greasbrough Canal, now culverted under the embankment of the A633 road. Eastwood lock marks the end of the Rotherham Cut, to be followed by Aldwarke Lock, in the shadow of the A6123 road bridge, and Kilnhurst flood lock, which marks the start of the Kilnhurst Cut. In Swinton, the stub of the Dearne and Dove Canal turns off to the left, and there are three more locks before the cut ends. Immediately following this, the River Dearne flows into the Don, and the towpath resumes, where the Dearne Way footpath ends.

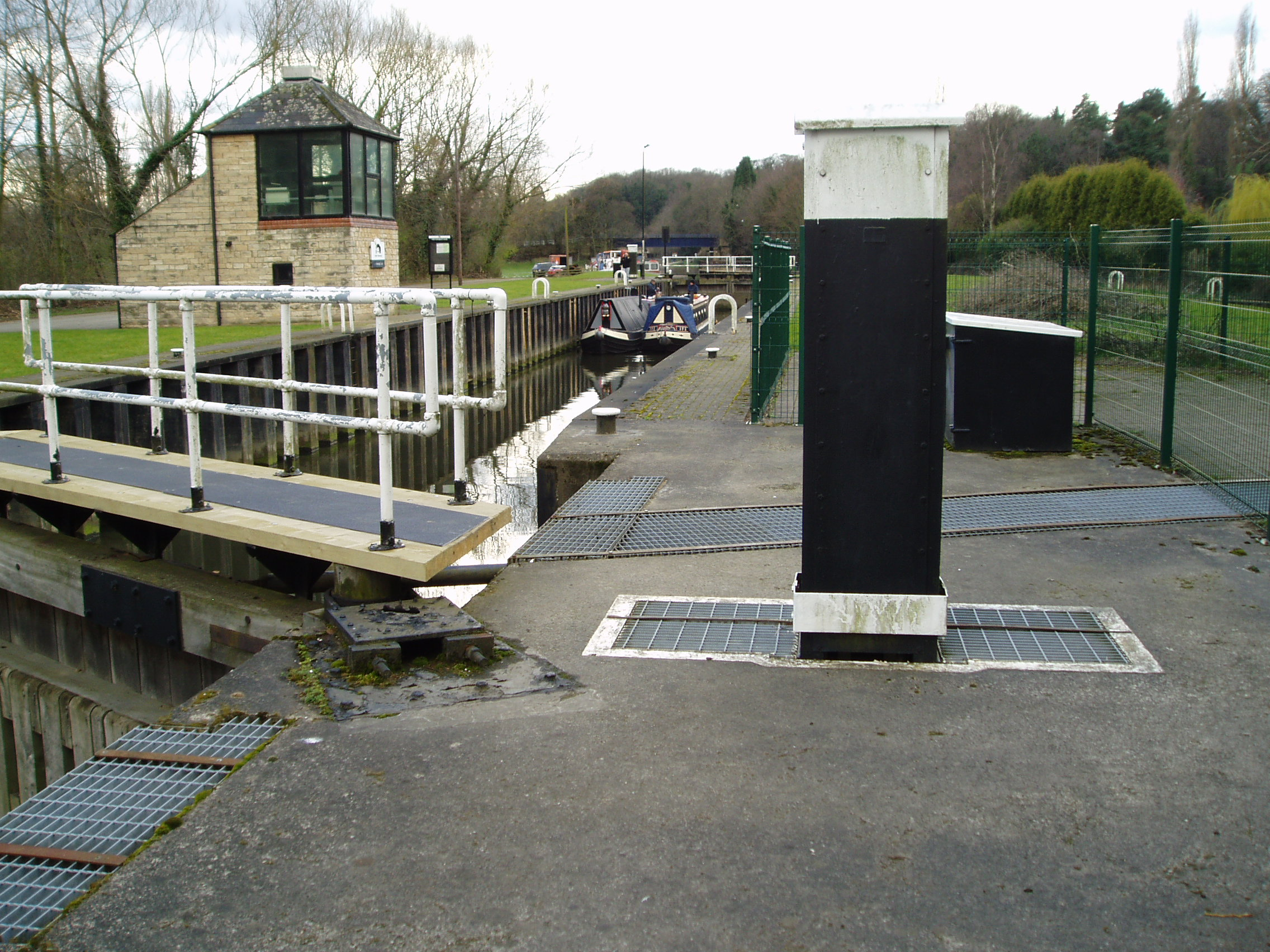
Two narrow boats dwarfed by the size of Sprotbrough Lock

The route continues through a wooded valley, past the site of the Sprotborough Flash Site of Special Scientific Interest (SSSI), with the towpath forming part of the Trans Pennine Trail. Sprotborough lock and weir are situated just before Sprotborough. Below the lock on the north bank are the remains of an engine house, built in the 1690s for Sir Godfrey Copley of Sprotborough Hall. A water wheel pumped river water some 100 feet (30 m) upwards to supply a fountain in the grounds of the hall, a swimming pool, and also provided a water supply for the village. The pump was powered by a water wheel which was removed in the 1970s. Soon the edge of Doncaster is reached, where amongst the railway marshalling yards, the River Don leaves the navigation for the final time, as does the towpath. The two weir streams flow either side of Doncaster prison, effectively forming an island on which the building sits. Doncaster Town Lock is situated close to Doncaster railway station, and between there and Long Sandall Lock, some of the changes which have occurred over the years can be visualised, with the river on the left and ox-bow lakes on the right, severed by the course of the Wheatley Cut. The final section to Bramwith is usually called the River Dun Navigation. At Bramwith, the waterway splits, with the New Junction Canal heading north-east for the Aire and Calder Navigation and Goole, and the Stainforth and Keadby Canal heading east to the River Trent at Keadby. The River Don heads northwards too, turning to the east where the Dutch River starts at Newbridge. The original course to the River Aire can be traced across the fields, now little more than a drainage ditch crossed by an oversized Grade II listed bridge on the A1041 at East Cowick, and Vermuyden's embankments are closely followed by the A614 road after it has crossed the M18 motorway.

== Structures ==
This section provides details of some of the many bridges crossing the Don Navigation, in west-to-east order, starting from Tinsley.

=== Tinsley area ===
MS&L railway bridge, which is located a little below the junction of the Sheffield Canal and the river, carries the Sheffield to Rotherham freight-only railway line. The railway, which opened in 1868, was originally part of the Manchester, Sheffield & Lincolnshire Railway, which later became part of the Great Central Railway. Between this railway bridge and Jordan Bridge, there are two bridges carrying pipes.

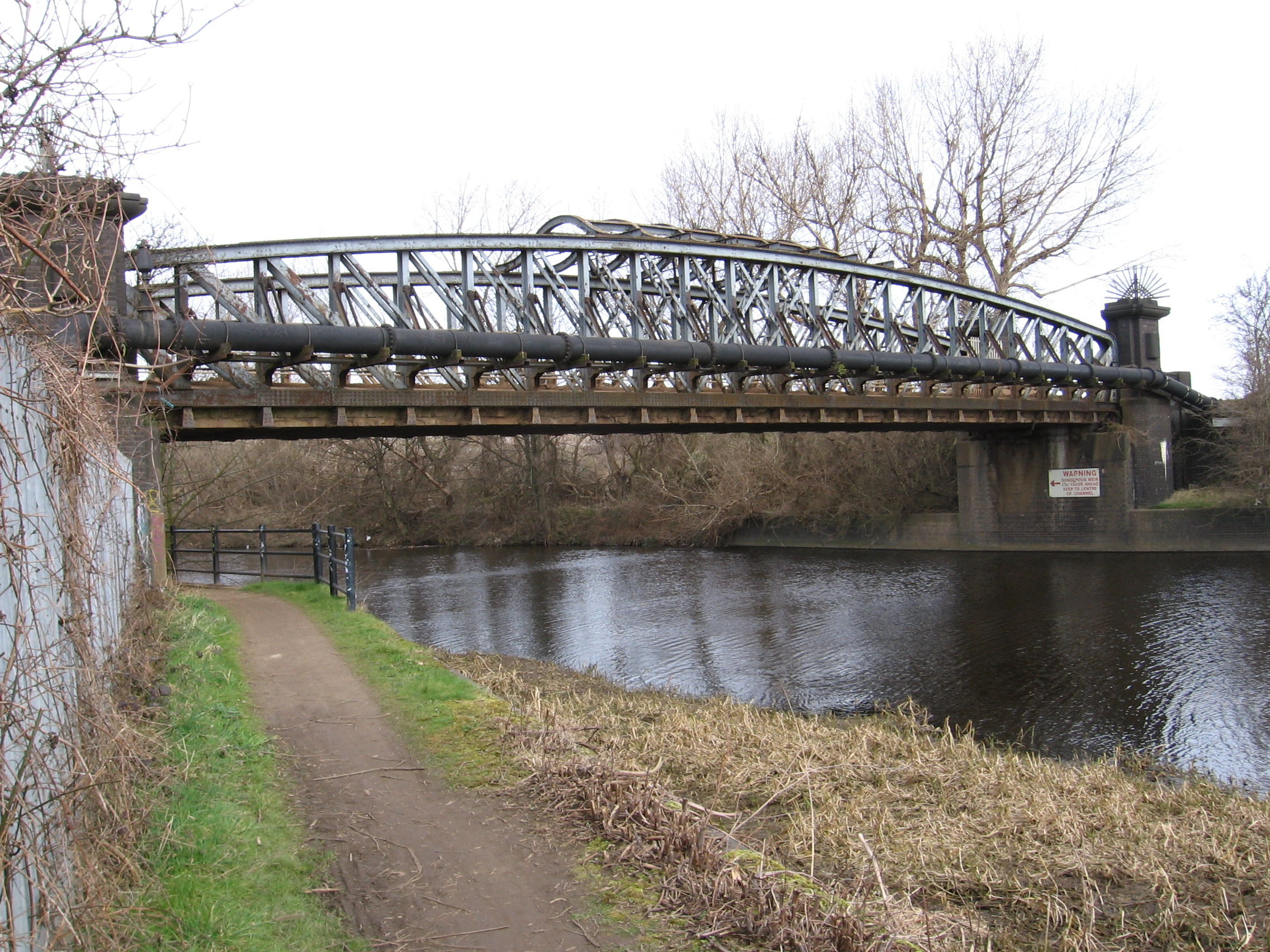
Jordan Bridge

Jordan Bridge, called "Jordan Bridge 21" by British Waterways, carried a railway that linked Blackburn Meadows Sewage Works to additional filters and contact beds to the east of the navigation. It was constructed by Logan and Hemmingway, who won a contract valued at £41,046 in April 1907, which included six settling tanks, 24 contact beds, and the bridge. The eastern approach consists of three brick arches, which allowed a siding to pass through it. Continued expansion of the works required a second bridge to be constructed in 1922, to carry the railway over the river channel. The steelwork for Holmes Bridge was supplied by Charles Ross Ltd, who were based in Sheffield, while piling work was carried out by Yorkshire Hennebique Concreting Co Ltd.

Holmes Lock Bridge carries Steel Street, a minor road linking the Blackburn Meadows Nature Reserve Car Park with Holmes. The bridge still has railway tracks embedded in part of the cobbled road surface. The tracks were part of a network of sidings which served the Holmes Rolling Mills on the north bank of the navigation, and the bridge provided access to a crushing plant situated on the island formed by the course of the river to the south and the Holmes Cut to the north.

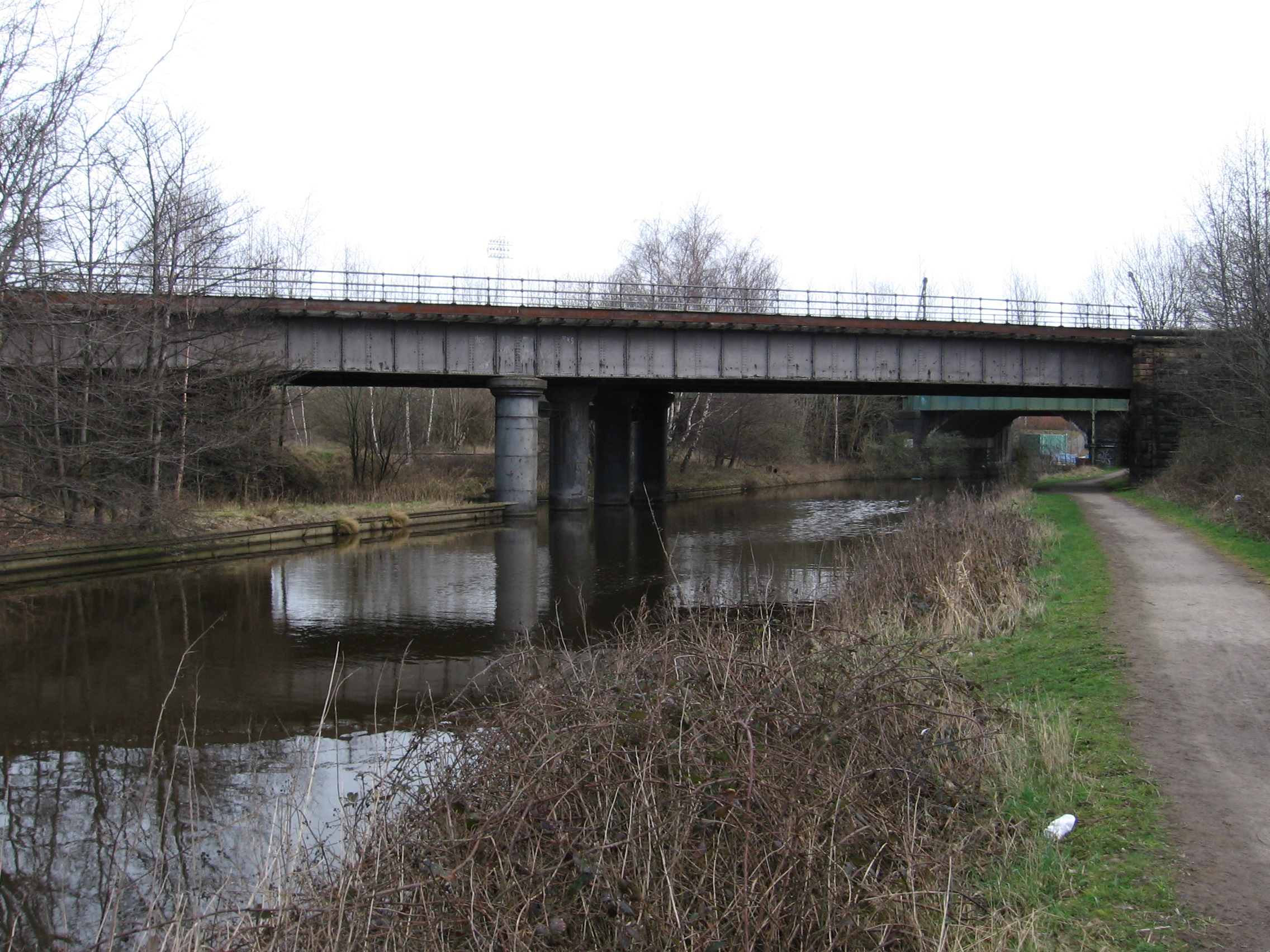
Midland Railway bridges

Midland Railway bridges are two parallel railway bridges. The western one was built in 1869, but the line it carried was truncated by the building of the Holmes Chord in the 1980s, and it is now unused. The eastern of the two bridges was built in 1840 as part of the North Midland Railway. This carried the "main line" from Derby to York until the diversion via Bradway and Sheffield was opened in 1870. The line is now freight-only.

Lockhouse Bridge, located just east of Ickles Lock, is actually two bridges. The western bridge carries the continuation of Millmoor Lane and the eastern the ex-MS&L freight-only line between Tinsley and Rotherham Central.

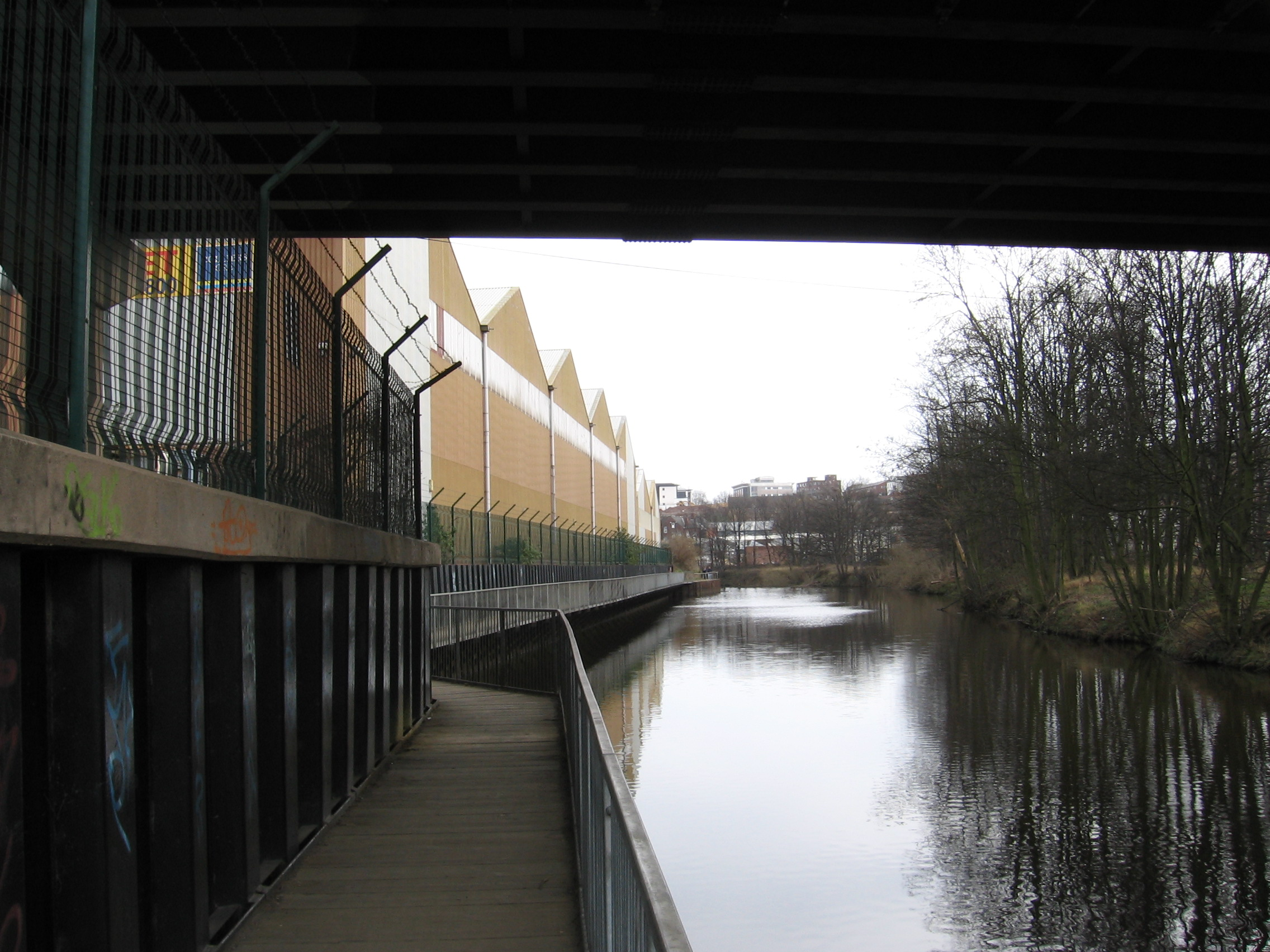
Walkway under Centenary Way

=== Rotherham area ===
Centenary Way bridge (south) carries the A630 Centenary Way dual carriageway over the navigation, which has now been re-joined by the River Don. The road (A630) is an upgrading of the old Canklow Road and is the main access into Rotherham from the M1. It also forms part of the Rotherham Ring Road which was begun about 1968, actually only goes half way around town, was built in sections and completed in 1995. The towpath of the navigation (part of the Trans-Pennine Trail) is carried on a walkway that is cantilevered over the Don from the retaining wall of the factory site to the north.

Corporation Bridge is a single-span metal bridge which carries Main Street over the navigation. Slightly upstream of this bridge was a wooden railway bridge with seven arches, built in 1838, that took the Sheffield and Rotherham Railway into Westgate Station. It was demolished in 1952. Prior to the re-routing of the canal in 1864, the Westgate line crossed the Holmes cut a little further to the west by a three-arched bridge, the centre arch of which was 36 feet (11 m) long and was made of iron.

Rotherham Lock footbridge provides pedestrian access to the Court House from Forge Island, which was once the site of an iron works but is now occupied by Tesco's. The River Don separates from the navigation above Forge Island, and there is a road and pedestrian bridge across the river into Forge Island.

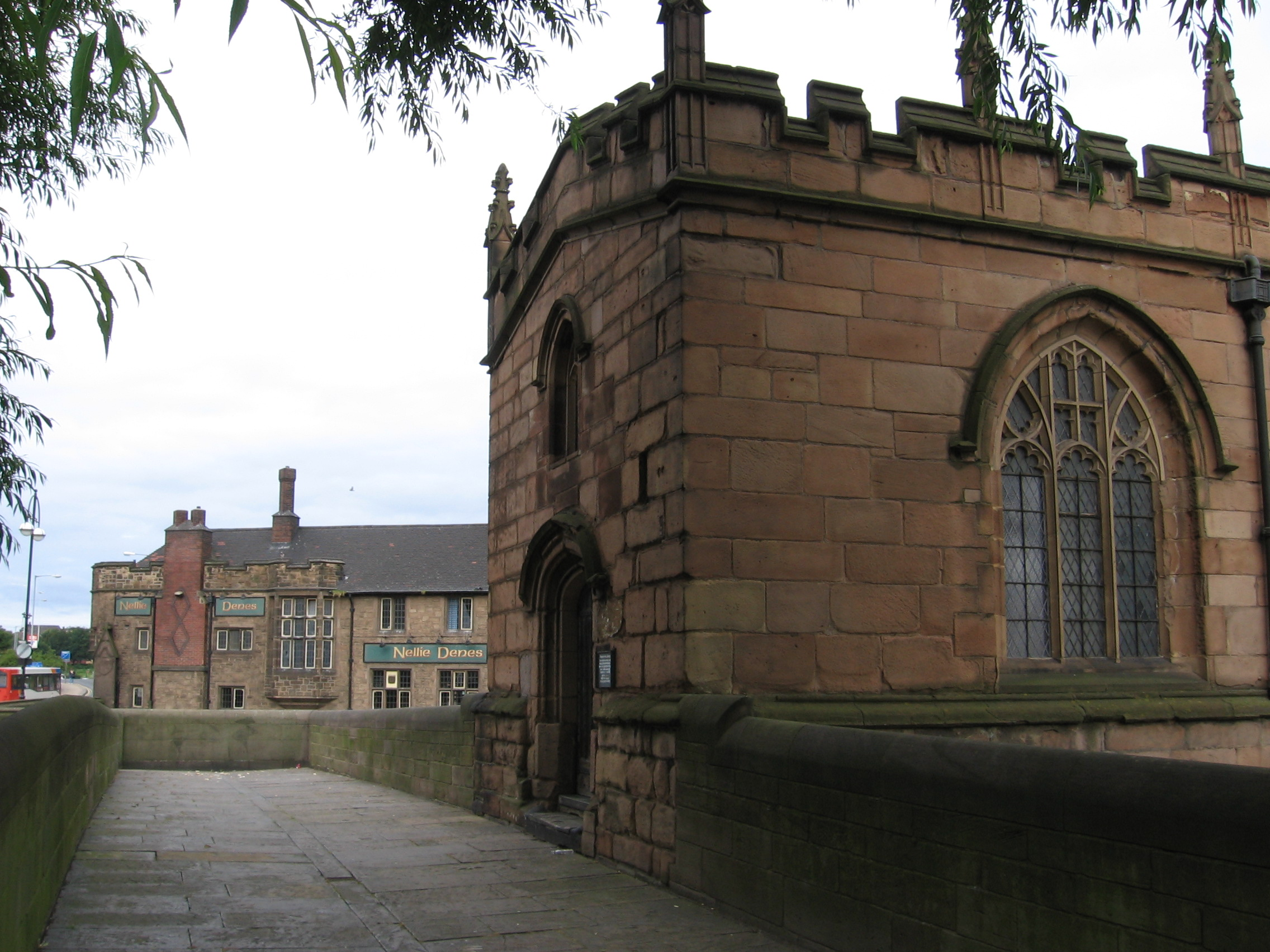
Chantry Chapel and Bridge

Bridge Street Bridge also known as Chantry Bridge is a single-span metal bridge that carries Bridge Street over the navigation. The street continues eastwards and originally crossed the river at Rotherham Bridge. As originally constructed in 1483 the bridge had four arches and was 15-foot (4.6 m) wide, but it was widened and a fifth arch added in 1768. In 1930 a new bridge was built nearby, a little further upstream, and as part of the work, the fifth arch was removed and the bridge was returned to its Medieval width. Because of improvements to the river made in the 18th and 19th centuries, it is wider than it used to be, and the bridge no longer reaches the west bank. The chapel on the bridge is one of only three complete bridge chapels that still exist in Britain, the other two being at Wakefield, West Yorkshire, and St Ives, Huntingdonshire. Dating from about 1483, it remained in use as a chapel until the reign of King Edward VI (1547–1553). It was put to use as almshouses during the 17th and 18th centuries, and in 1779 it was used as a prison. Later, it became a private dwelling and finally a tobacconist's shop, before being returned to its original use as a chapel; it was formally reconsecrated in 1924 by the Bishop of Sheffield, and restoration of the interior took place in 1980.

Centenary Way bridge (north) carries the Centenary Way dual carriageway over the navigation.

Greasbrough Road Bridge carries Greasbrough Road, which is no longer a main road and only serves local businesses. Downstream of this bridge are 3 pipe bridges.

Rawmarsh Road Bridge, called “Rotherham Rawmarsh Road Bridge 39” by British Waterways, carries the A633 Rotherham Road (from Rotherham to Parkgate). The A633 crossing of the River Don is called Grafton Bridge.

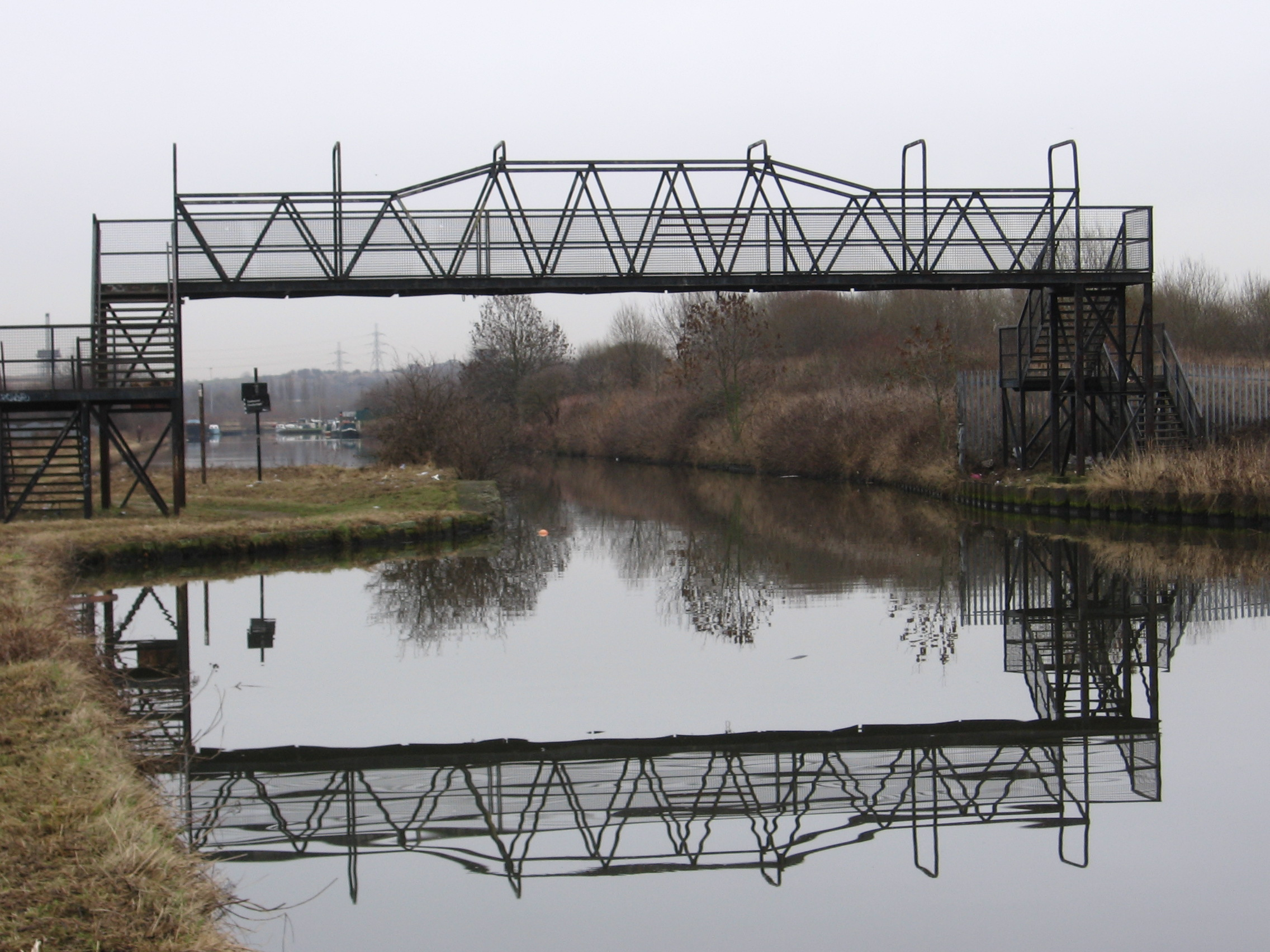
Eastwood Footbridge

Eastwood Footbridge carries the public footpath from the Eastwood area of Rotherham to the Parkgate Retail Park. When the Rotherham Cut section of the Don Navigation was constructed in 1740, the crossing was by means of a swing bridge. This was replaced by a high-level footbridge in the late 1900s. To the south of Eastwood Footbridge is a bailey bridge crossing of the River Don.

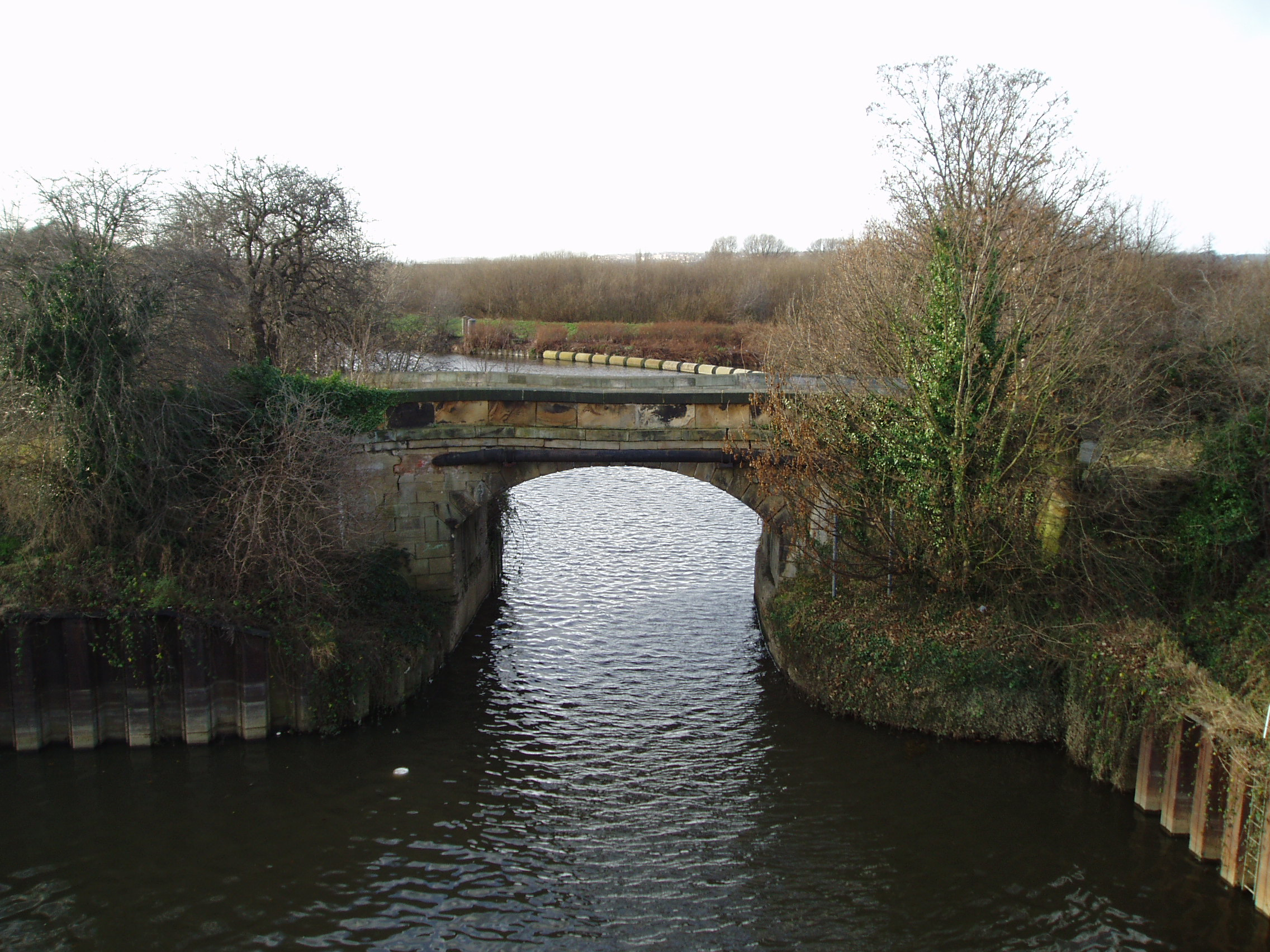
Wash Lane Bridge near Aldwarke Lock

Wash Lane Bridge is situated immediately downstream of Aldwarke Weir and upstream of Aldwarke Lock. It was rebuilt in 1834. In more recent times, it has been superseded by the A6123 (Aldwarke Lane) road bridge, a concrete flyover spanning both river and navigation. The bridge is now gated at both ends to prevent access to pedestrians and traffic.

Steelworks access (road) bridge provides access to the two steelworks from the A630 road at Dalton.

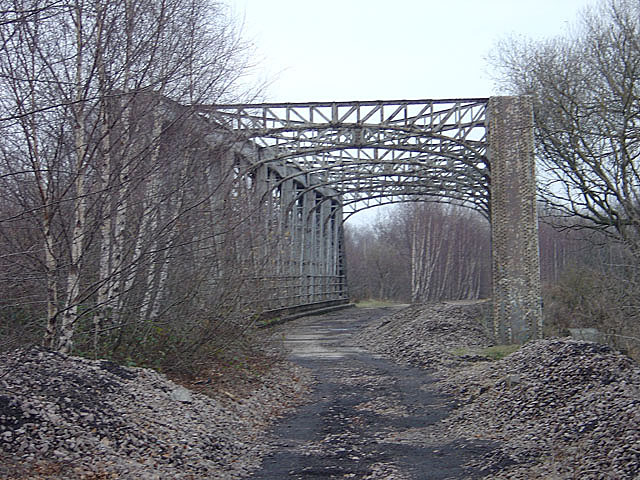
Thrybergh Bridge

Don (rail) Bridge forms part of the internal rail network of the two steelworks. It was constructed in 1901 as part of what was called locally John Brown's Private Railway. This railway connected the Silverwood and Roundwood Collieries of John Brown & Company with wharves on the Don Navigation. The girder bridge crossing the Don Navigation was the main engineering work on this railway line. It was built by Newton, Chambers & Company.

Thrybergh (rail) Bridge carried the former Great Central and Midland Railways' joint line across the River Don. This line was double track. It was essentially a colliery line and never carried a regular passenger service.

=== Kilnhurst and Mexborough area ===
Kilnhurst Station Road Bridge or Hooton Road Bridge is bridge number 46 and carries the road to Hooton Roberts. The bridge over the Navigation adjoins the bridge over the railway. The bridge over the railway is original, but that over the Navigation is a modern replacement. Kilnhurst Central railway station was immediately downstream of the bridge, until it closed in 1968. The road continues to the east to cross the Don at Kilnhurst Bridge, and continues to the west as Victoria Street and Kilnhurst West railway station, which also closed in 1968.

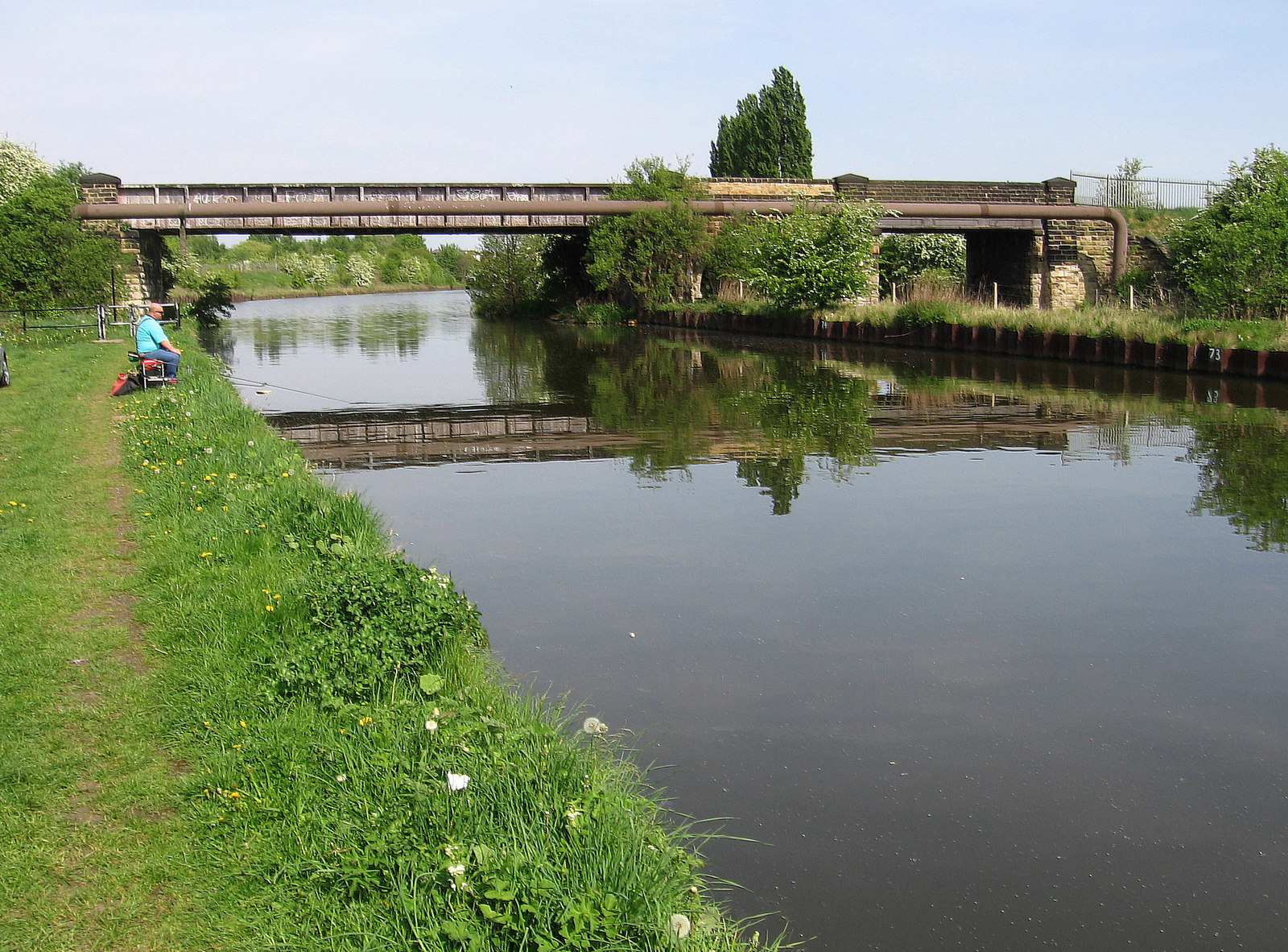
Kilnhurst Burton Ings Bridge

Kilnhurst Burton Ings Bridge is bridge number 47 and conveys a service road over the Navigation and railway. At this point on the west side of the Navigation, there was a large tar distillation works and it is probable that this road connected that works with a tip or further chemical plant on the east side. The tar distillation works was built by Ellison & Mitchell in 1886 and became part of the Yorkshire Tar Distillers group in 1927.

Swinton Talbot Road Bridge is bridge number 48 and connects the main road in Swinton (A6022 Bridge Street and Rowms Lane) with an industrial estate whose principal unit is the Morphy Richards distribution centre.

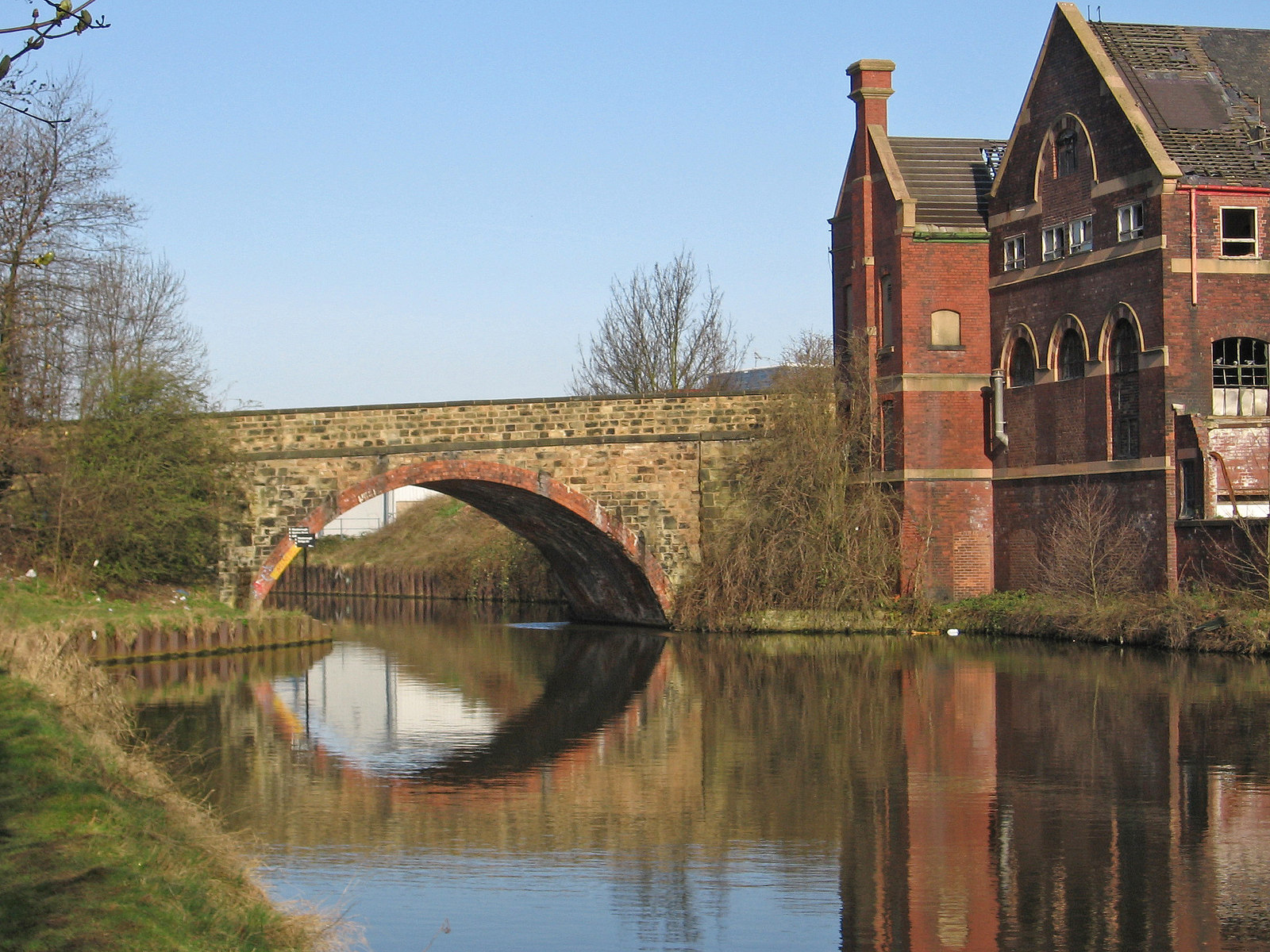
Mexborough Station Road Bridge

Mexborough Double Bridges is named "Double Bridges and Footbridge 49A" by the Canal & River Trust. The bridge carries a footway and double-track railway over the Navigation. This section of the Navigation was quite challenging for full-size barges to negotiate since the bridges are immediately adjacent to a right-angle bend in the canal, which was created when the railways to Mexborough were built in the late 1840s. Further work was required in the 1980s, when the navigation was upgraded, to allow larger barges to negotiate the bridges.

Mexborough Station Road Bridge is bridge number 52 and carries the access road to Mexborough railway station from the A6023 Greens Way (and the town centre).

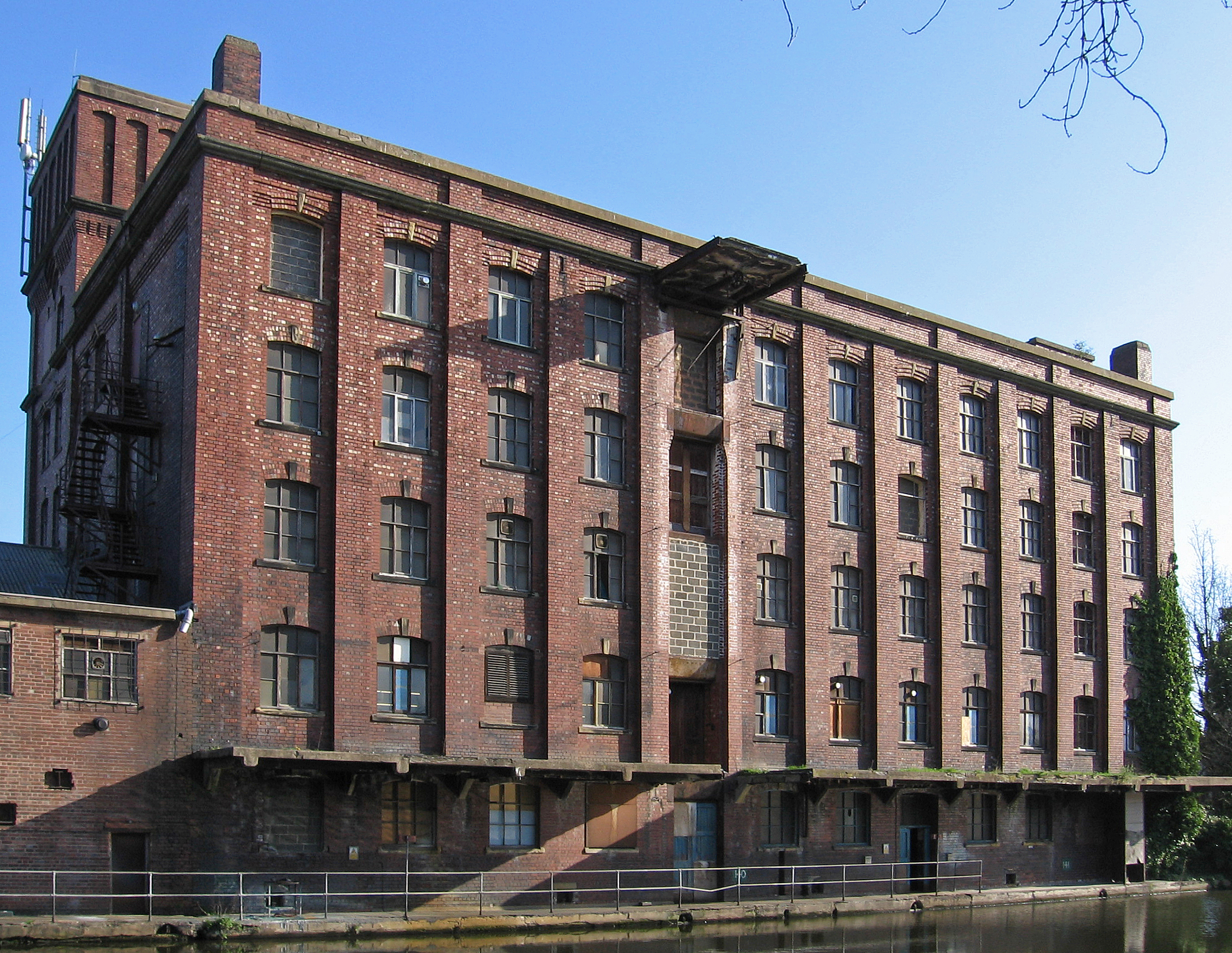
Mexborough BBCS Flour Mill

Mexborough BBCS Flour Mill is an imposing building and associated wharf standing on the north side of the Navigation close to the Church of St John the Baptist. It started off as the "Don Roller Mills". It was owned by James White who sold it to the Barnsley British Cooperative Society in 1912.

=== Conisbrough and Warmsworth area ===
Conisbrough Earth Centre Bridge

Conisbrough Earth Centre Bridge is named "Cadeby Colliery Bridge 57" by the Canal & River Trust because it once provided a road access to Cadeby Colliery from the south. From 1999 to 2004, the bridge provided the main access to the ill-fated Earth Centre visitor attraction. The bridge now forms part of public access from Conisbrough Station to the main (west-east) section of the Trans Pennine Trail. There are two pipe bridges just upstream of the road bridge.

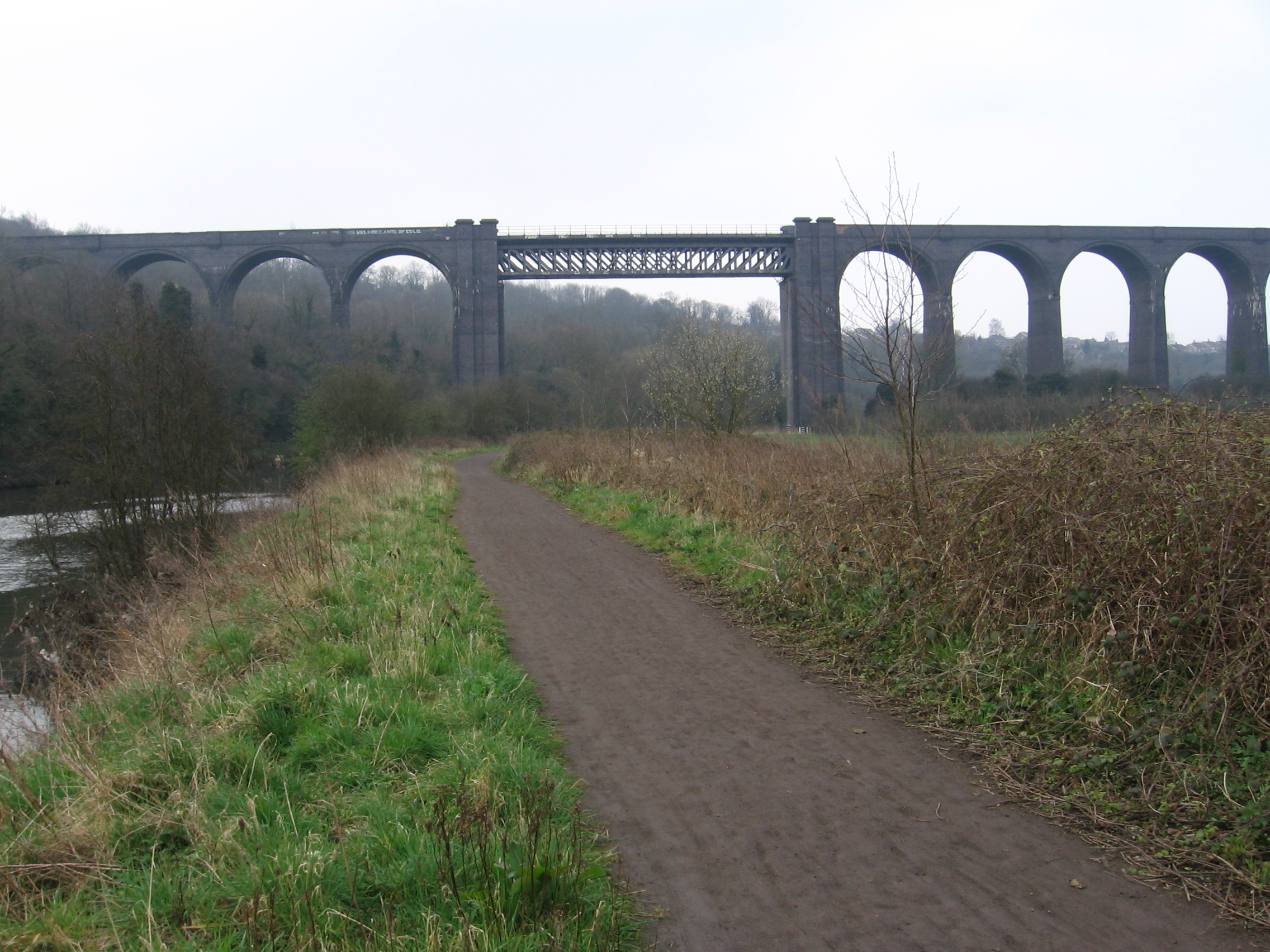
Conisbrough Viaduct

Conisbrough Viaduct was built in the first decade of the 20th century as part of the Dearne Valley Railway. This was a line which essentially served a coalfield, although there was a rudimentary passenger service between 1912 and 1951. The remaining coal traffic on the line ceased in 1966. The viaduct has 21 arches and was built from 12 million Conisbrough blue bricks. The central metal span is 150 feet (46 m) long and crosses the Don at a height of 113 feet (34 m). The viaduct remained out of use until 2001, when ownership was transferred to Railway Paths Ltd, who manage potentially useful railway structures until they can be incorporated into the National Cycle Network. Installation of a new deck surface and safety railings were funded by the Railway Heritage Trust in early 2008, and the viaduct re-opened as part of the Sustrans network in April 2008.

Rainbow Bridge was built in 1849 as part of the South Yorkshire Railway, which later became part of the Great Central Railway. Three huge ribs of cast iron weighing 600 tons and cast at Conisbrough formed an attractive arched span. The bridge was replaced in 1928 by a flat steel decked bridge, to cope with increasingly heavy trains and locomotives. The bridge is still in use and carries the Swinton to Doncaster railway line.

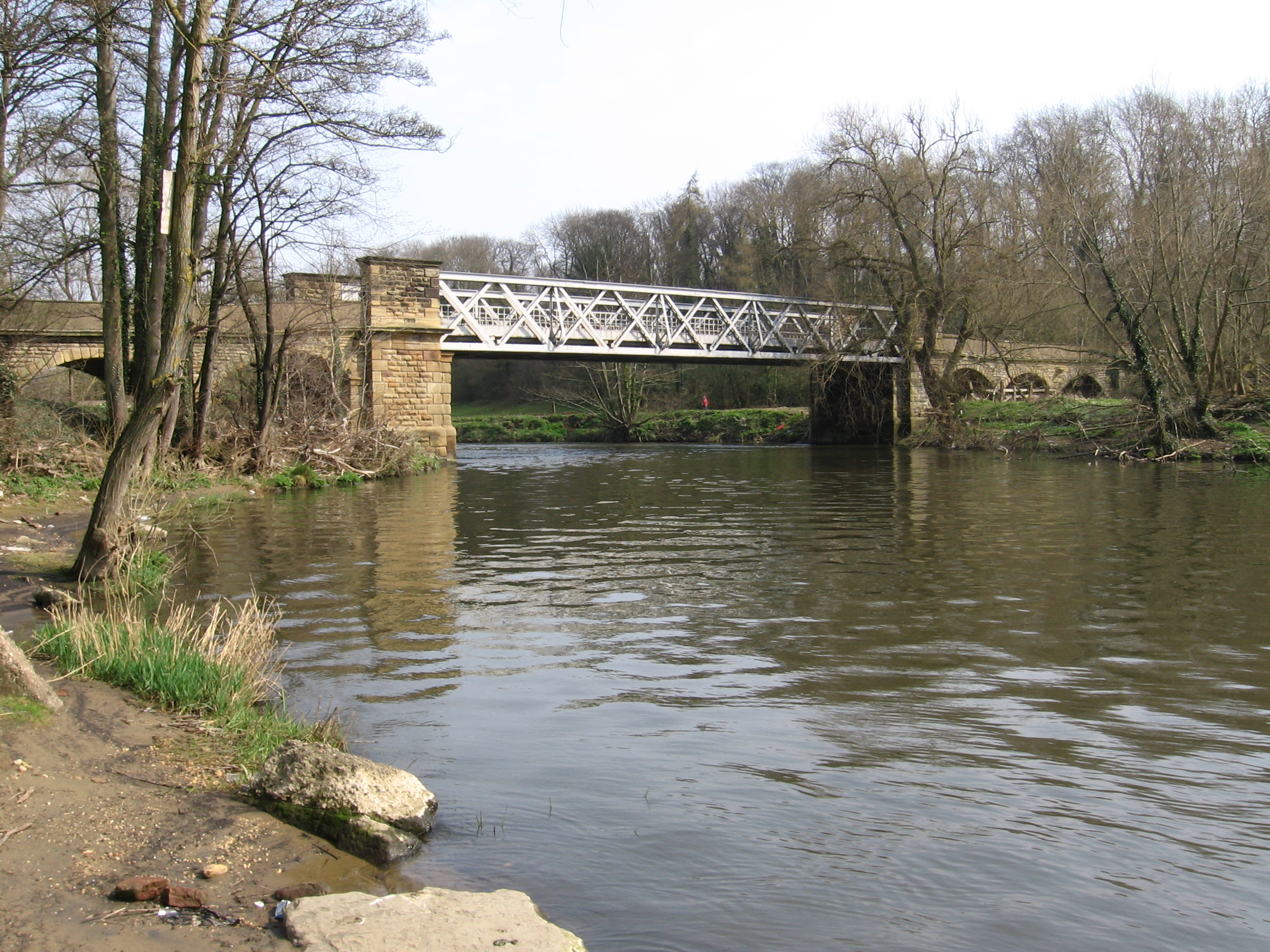
Sprotbrough Bridge (southern)

Sprotbrough Bridge is actually two bridges that carry Mill Lane, the southern one crossing the weir stream and the northern one crossing the lock cut. Replacing a ferry crossing of the river, the first bridge and associated toll house were built in 1849 for Sir Joseph William Copley of Sprotbrough Hall. The designers of the southern bridge were Benjamin Brundell and William Arnold, and the present structure has three segmental arches on each side, which originally formed the approaches to a central arch. The arch was replaced by an above-deck truss in 1897. The ironwork was manufactured by Newton Chambers & Co. Ltd., who were based at Thorncliffe Ironworks in Sheffield, as recorded by plates attached to the bridge. The northern bridge was a single-arched masonry structure, which has been replaced by a plate girder bridge resting on the original piers. The toll house, consisting of a single storey with a half basement, made of dressed sandstone with an asphalt roof, still survives on the northern bank of the lock cut. Tolls collected here for passage over Sprotbrough Bridge were said to have been given by the Copley family to the Doncaster Dispensary.

The A1 Don Viaduct carries the A1(M) motorway over the river; it was opened by Ernest Marples, the Minister of Transport, on 31 July 1961. It consists of two separate structures, one for each carriageway, each having seven spans. The longest span, formed from two 40-foot (12 m) cantilevers and a suspended central span of 100 feet (30 m), carries the motorway over the river at a height of 70 feet (21 m). The total length of the structure is 760 feet (230 m), and it has a slight horizontal and vertical curve at its southern end. Five riveted steel girders and a 9-inch (23 cm) composite concrete deck support each carriageway. The bridge was one of the first to use rubber bearings, and the first to use bitumen membranes lined with copper to make the decks waterproof. The design includes jacking points to compensate for mining subsidence.

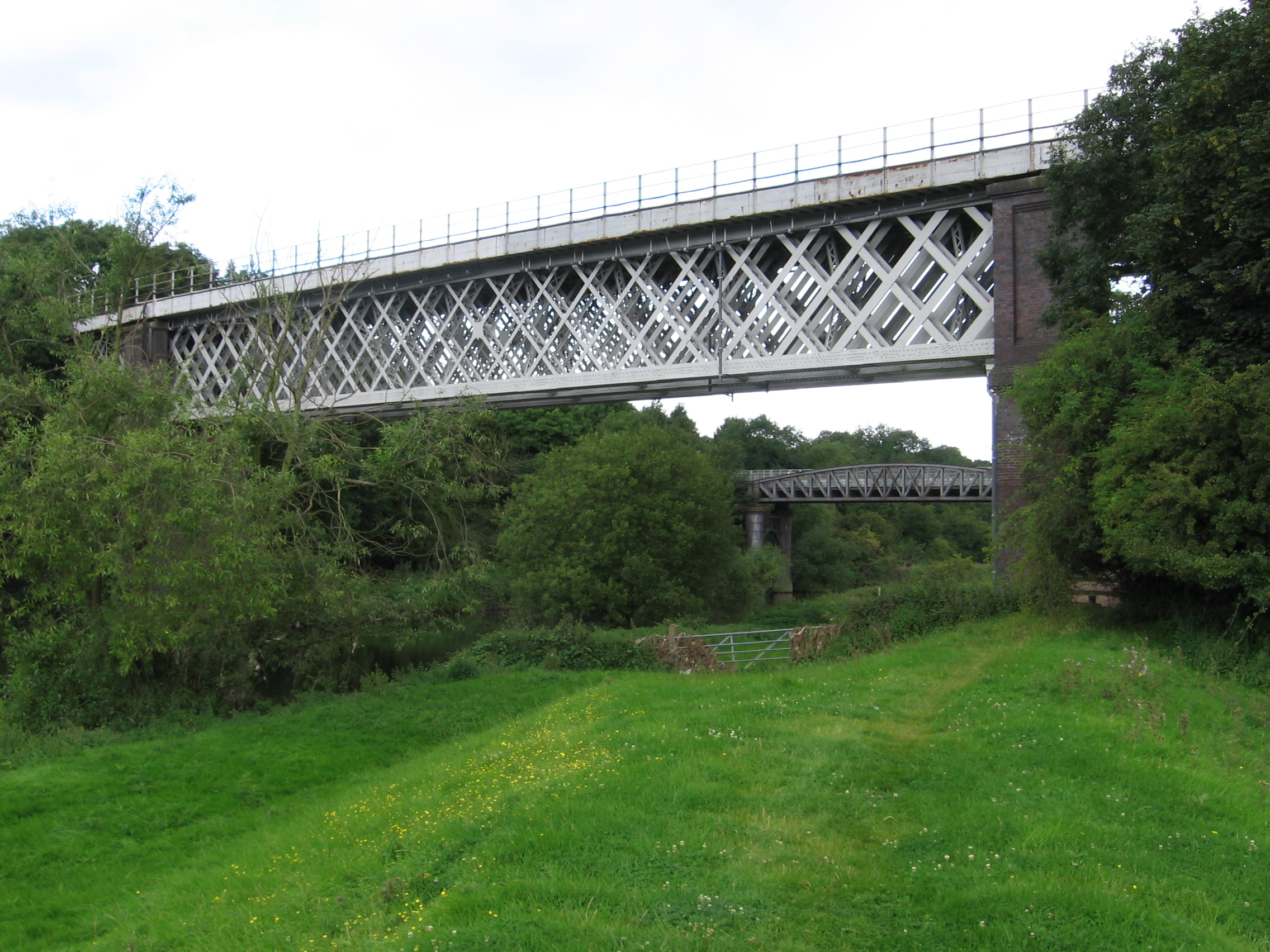
The two viaducts at Warmsworth

Warmsworth railway viaducts are a pair of railway viaducts at Warmsworth. The western one was completed in 1914 and formed part of the Hull & Barnsley and Great Central Joint Railway. This was essentially a railway to serve the coalfield and was closed in 1958. For some years after closure, the viaduct was used to carry a conveyor belt over the Don. It became part of the Doncaster spur on the Trans-Pennine Trail, which was officially opened in 2001. The steel pillars supporting the viaduct are filled with limestone. Its construction, which uses an above-deck truss, contrasts with the below-deck truss of the eastern viaduct, which was completed in 1910 and formed part of the Great Central Railway. It still carries a freight-only line that avoids a crossing on the level of the East Coast Main Line at Doncaster Station.

=== Doncaster Town area ===
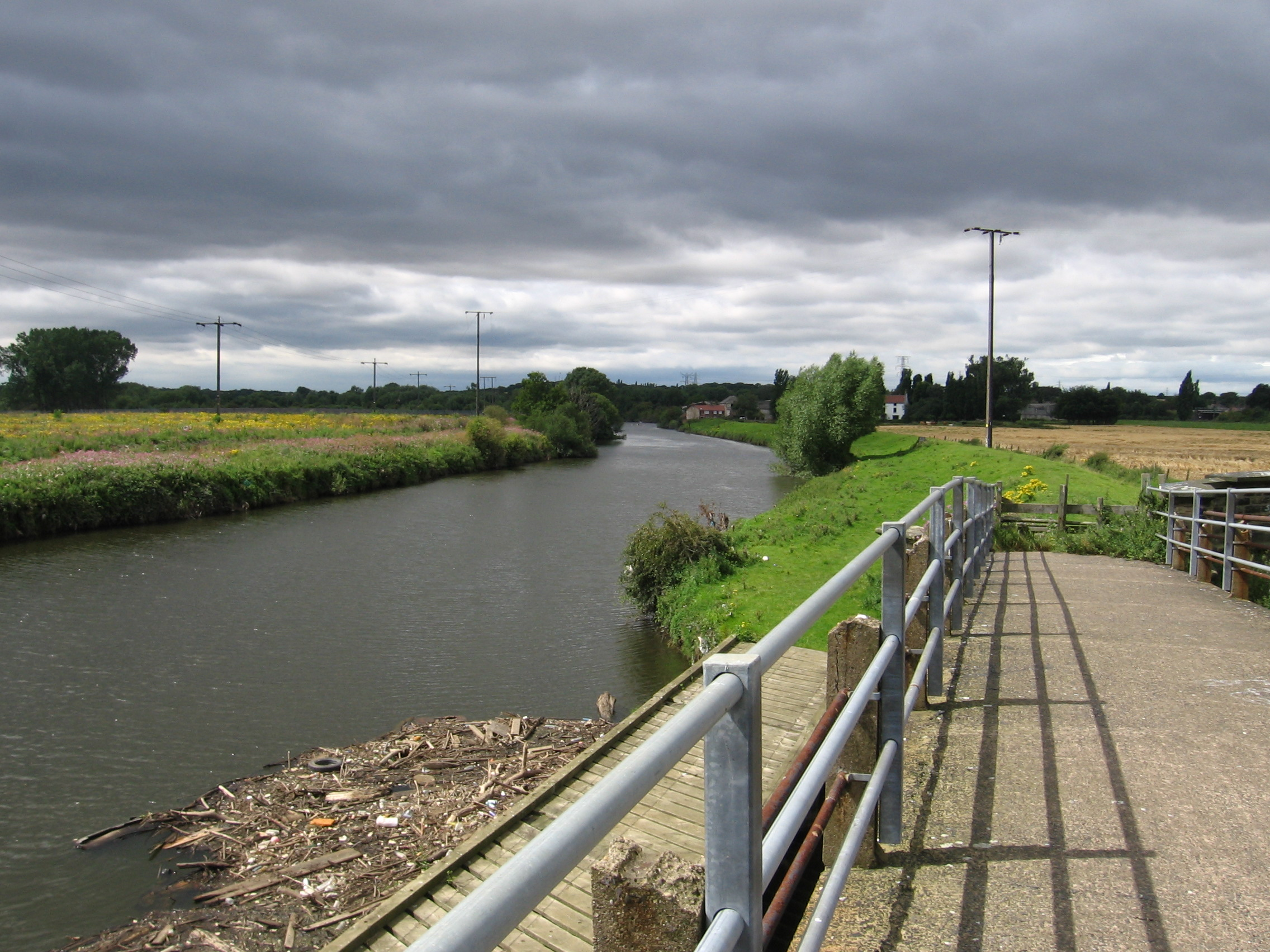
Newtons Farm footbridge, with debris from the flooding in June 2007 to the left of the wooden part of the bridge.

Newtons Farm Footbridge or Newton Ings Footbridge consisted of two bridges side-by side, one made of concrete and the other a wooden bridge, which cross one of the two weir channels where the river leaves the navigation before Doncaster Town Lock. The concrete bridge is a three-span reinforced concrete structure, which was constructed between 1953 and 1959. It is 143 feet (43.6 m) long, and has been officially closed since December 2011. However, barriers preventing access have been regularly removed by the public, in order to access Public Rights of Way Footpath No.5. which crosses the bridge. Attempts to get it repaired in 2017 foundered when quotations for the work exceeded the amount of funding available. With the condition of the bridge continuing to deteriorate, proposals to demolish the bridge were made in 2018. The decking of the wooden bridge was no longer in situ by 2018.

Cheswold Hauling Bridge, also known as Cheswold High Bridge, is a footbridge on the navigation towpath, which crosses the second of the two weir streams where the river leaves the navigation upstream of Doncaster Town Lock. The small section of river between the footbridge and where it rejoins that part of the River Don that left the navigation at Newtons Farm footbridge is called the River Cheswold, reputedly the shortest river in Great Britain.

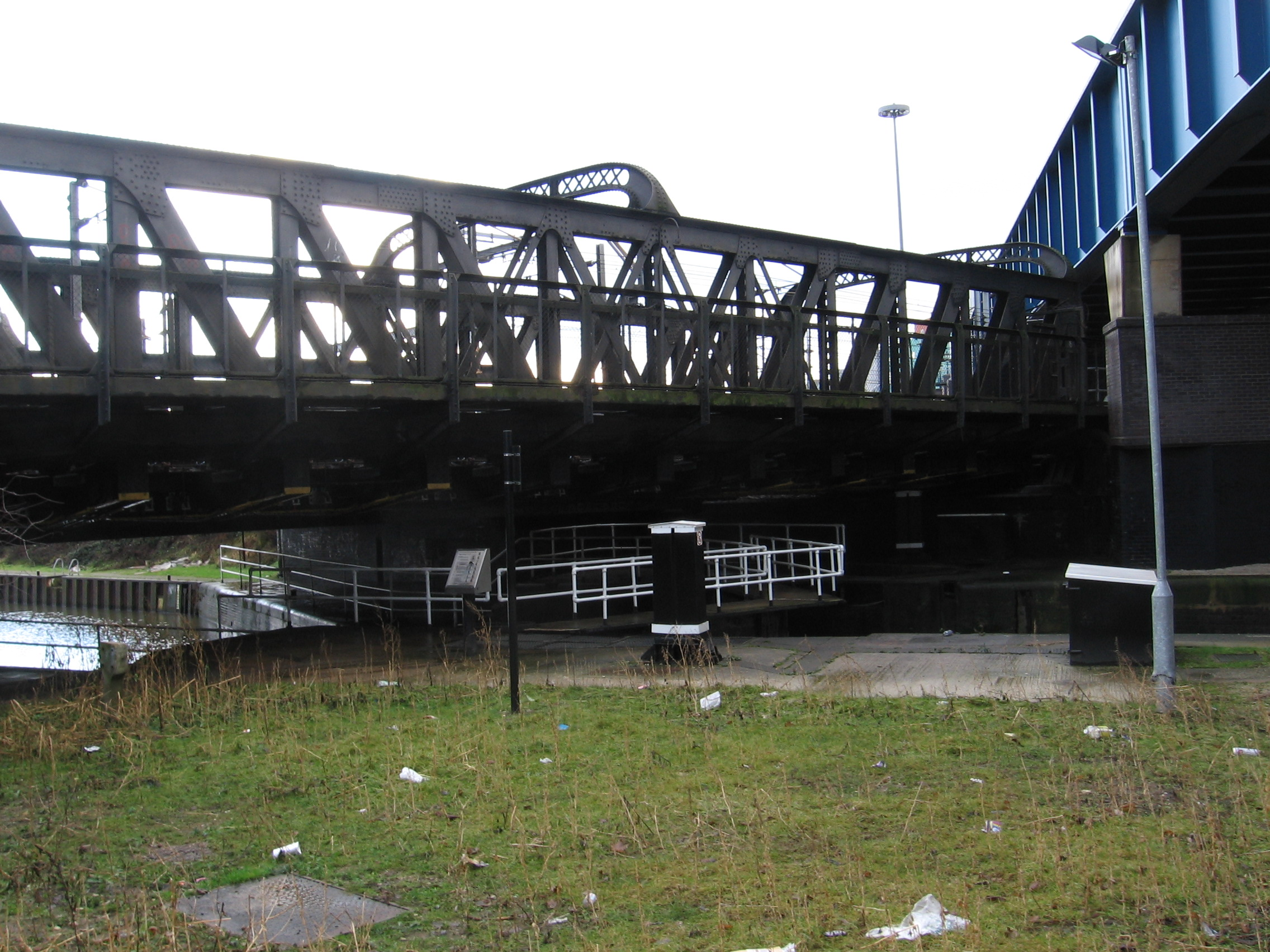
Doncaster Railway Bridges, showing North Bridge to the right

North Bridge carries North Bridge Road over the railway and then the navigation at Doncaster Town Lock, and St Mary's Bridge carries it over the Don. North Bridge Road was previously part of the Great North Road. Until 1910, this crossed the railway on the level before crossing the Don Navigation. After 1910, a lengthy iron bridge took the road over the railway, navigation and river. This bridge was replaced by the current North Bridge in 2003. Its use was restricted to buses, taxis, cyclists and pedestrians from the time the new St George's Bridge opened, until 2015, when all northbound traffic was allowed to use the bridge again to help with congestion problems on St George's Bridge. South bound traffic still carries the same traffic restrictions. The new bridge was constructed over the top of the old one while it was still in situ. Once the old bridge had been stripped of its surface trimmings the deck was cut up into 25-tonne sections, which were suspended from the new structure. A pulley system was used to transport these sections along the underside of the new bridge, so that they could be lowered onto the towpath, where they were cut up further before removal from the site.

Three separate Railway bridges to the north of Doncaster Station and North Bridge carry six railway tracks across the Don Navigation. This section of tracks is known as Marshgate Junction and is where the lines to Leeds, York and Thorne diverge.

Friars Gate Bridge provides access across the navigation from the centre of Doncaster to the small businesses and car parks on the "island" between the river and navigation.

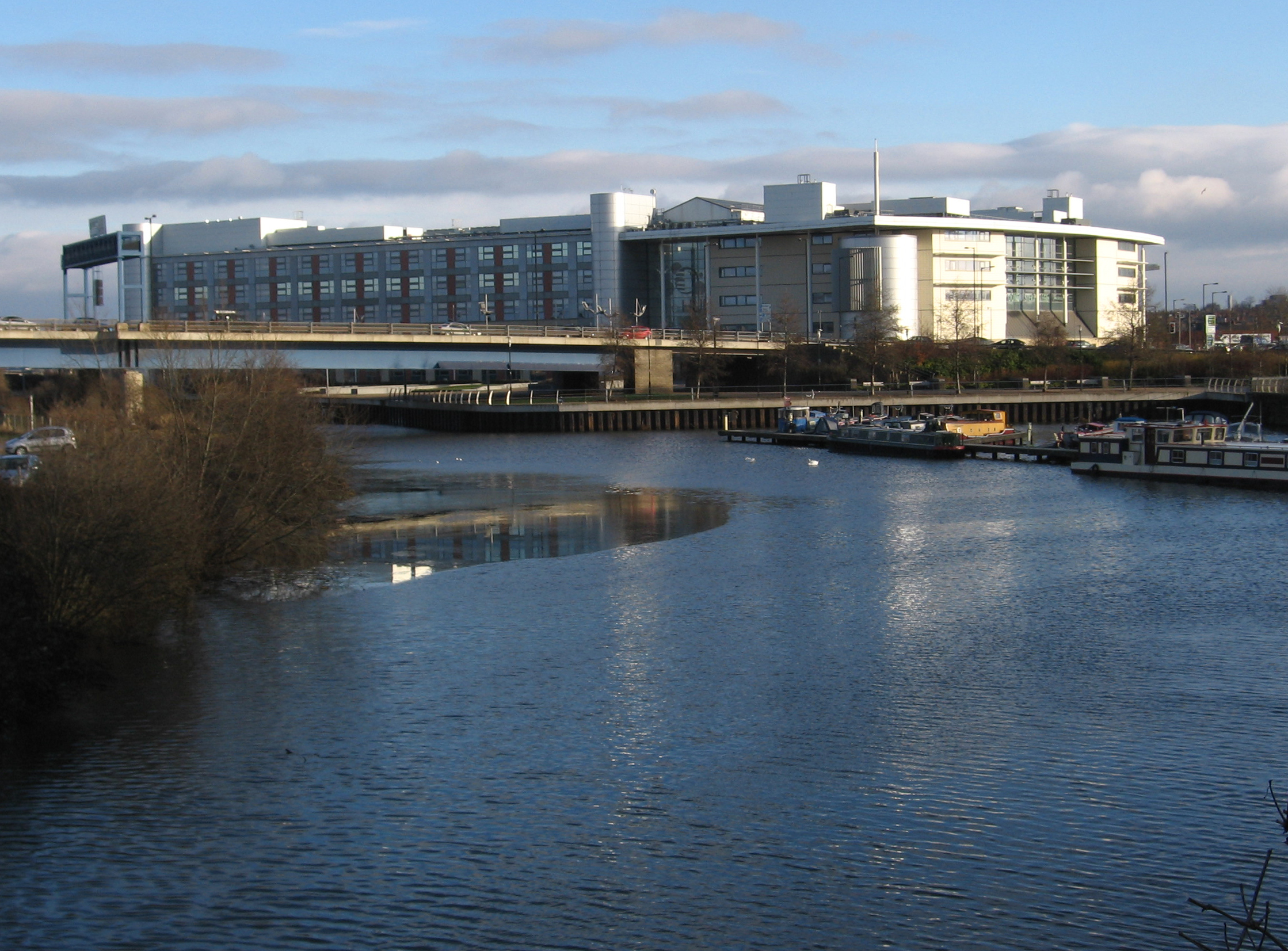
St George's Bridge, the Hub and the Waterside Area

St George's Bridge is one of the newest bridges over the Don. It carries the dual carriageway New Bridge Road, part of the A19, which is now the main road north out of Doncaster. It was opened on 22 November 2001, and was named St George's Bridge as a result of a public competition. It consists of a 690-yard (630 m) long steel-composite bridge with spans of 49 yards (45 m) over the River Don, the East Coast Main Line, and the Don Navigation. The ladder beam layout, using two main plate girders, cross-girders at 13 feet (4.0 m) centres and precast planks, was chosen both to optimise the deck and to minimise the size and number of the piers.

Chappell Drive Bridge provides access across the navigation from the centre of Doncaster to the small businesses situated on the "island" between the river and navigation. It is situated immediately north of the Hub campus of Doncaster College. Going downstream, there is a gap of some 5 miles (8 km) before the next public road crossing of the navigation at Barnby Dun.

=== Barnby Dun area ===
Long Sandall Railway Bridge

Long Sandall Railway Bridge conveys the (ex-Great Central Railway) Doncaster-to-Hull railway over the Navigation. The bridge consists of two single-span decks, both with above deck trusses. The older south deck is no longer used. The north deck accommodates both tracks of what is now a double-track railway. The quadruple track from Thorne Junction on this line now finishes at Kirk Sandall Junction, a few hundred metres to the east. A further bridge to the west conveys the railway over the River Don.

Kirk Sandall Pipe Bridge

Kirk Sandall Pipe Bridge is located at a point where the Navigation runs parallel to, and a few metres to the south-east of, the River Don. A pipe bridge high above both the Navigation and the river once carried waste from the glass works which adjoined the towpath (to the south-east) across to a series of settling ponds (to the north-west). The glass works was a major employer in the Kirk Sandall area. The St Helens-based Pilkington Bros established a plate glass works here in the early 1920s. The site was chosen for its proximity to the canal and railway, and for the sandy terrain which was needed for the production of glass. Pilkingtons also funded the building of 400 new houses in the Brecks Lane area, together with associated school and recreational facilities. The glass works closed in the 1990s and its site is now occupied by various units on an industrial estate.

Barnby Dun Lift Bridge

Barnby Dun Lift Bridge was built in 1983 to replace the original (1900) swing bridge. It is built of steel and powered by electricity. The replacement work cost £0.5 million and was part of a wider upgrade of the Navigation to conform to the 700-tonne Eurobarge standard (see Later Development section of this article). An elevated control house was built for the sole use of operational staff, but in recent years a freestanding low level standard control console has been built for the use of boaters when the bridge is not staffed. Sykehouse Lift Bridge (downstream of Barnby Dun) was built to the same technical specification. The structure is sturdier than might be expected for a bridge that carries an unclassified road linking Barnby Dun and Bentley, but it was the only way for abnormal loads to access the nearby Thorpe Marsh power station, so the bridge was designed for loads of up to 180 tons gross weight. Although Thorpe Marsh Power Station has now been demolished, the bridge is still busy with road traffic, as it is one of the few crossings of the Navigation in this area.

== Points of interest ==
Point	Coordinates (Links to map resources)	OS Grid Ref	Notes
Site of Turnbridge sluice	53.6974°N 0.9854°W	SE670228	Jn with River Aire
Newbridge	53.6738°N 0.9908°W	SE667201	Jn with Dutch River
Site of Stainforth Lock	53.6043°N 1.0266°W	SE645124	closed 1939
Start of New Junction Canal	53.5902°N 1.0755°W	SE612108	opened 1905
Doncaster Town lock	53.5259°N 1.1410°W	SE570035	below R Cheswold
Sprotbrough lock	53.5089°N 1.1879°W	SE539016	
Mexborough low lock	53.4950°N 1.2452°W	SE501000	Start of Kilnhurst cut
Eastwood lock	53.4436°N 1.3378°W	SK440943	Start of Rotherham cut
Jn with Sheffield Canal	53.4183°N 1.3991°W	SK400914	Halfpenny Bridge
Sheffield Basin	53.3847°N 1.4590°W	SK360876	opened 1819

== See also ==
- Canals of Great Britain
- History of the British canal system
- River Don, South Yorkshire, for information on that (non-navigable) part of the River Don, west of Tinsley.
- Earl Fitzwilliam's private railway

== Bibliography ==
- Allan, Ian (2002). Sectional Maps of Britain's Railways. Ian Allan. ISBN 978-0-7110-2878-4.
- Booth, A. J. (1986). Sheffield's Sewage Works Railways. Industrial Railway Society. ISSN 0537-5347.
- Butt, R. V. J. (October 1995). The Directory of Railway Stations: details every public and private passenger station, halt, platform and stopping place, past and present (1st ed.). Sparkford: Patrick Stephens Ltd. ISBN 978-1-85260-508-7. OCLC 60251199. OL 11956311M.
- Drake, James (1840). "Drake's Road Book of the Sheffield and Rotherham Railway". Birmingham: J Drake.
- Edwards, L. A. (1985). Inland Waterways of Great Britain (6th Ed). Imray Laurie Norie and Wilson. ISBN 978-0-85288-081-4.
- Hadfield, Charles (1972). The Canals of Yorkshire and North East England (Vol 1). David and Charles. ISBN 978-0-7153-5719-4.
- Hadfield, Charles (1973). The Canals of Yorkshire and North East England (Vol 2). David and Charles. ISBN 978-0-7153-5975-4.
- Joy, David (1984). Regional History of Railways of Great Britain Volume 8 South & West Yorkshire. David & Charles. ISBN 978-0-946537-11-2.
- Lima, R.; Bachmann, R. (2002). "Blackburn Meadows wastewater treatment works" (PDF). International Journal of Water. 2 (1). Int. J. Water: 35. Bibcode:2002IJWat...2...35L. doi:10.1504/IJW.2002.002076. hdl:10198/1421. Archived (PDF) from the original on 22 March 2012.
- Nicholson (2006). Nicholson Guides Vol 6: Nottingham, York & the North East. Harper Collins Publishing Ltd. ISBN 978-0-00-721114-2.
- Parkin, Hugh (2008). "A Journey on Foot from Hexthorpe to Conisbrough" (PDF). Doncaster Civic Trust. Archived from the original (PDF) on 21 March 2012.
- Richardson, Christine; Lower, John (1995). The Complete Guide to the Sheffield and South Yorkshire Navigation. Hallamshire Press. ISBN 978-1-874718-07-9.
- Royston, Geoff; Milnes, Roger (November 1991). "The Silverwood Branch". Forward — the journal of the GCRS. No. 84. Great Central Railway Society. ISSN 0141-4488.
- Skempton, Sir Alec; et al. (2002). A Biographical Dictionary of Civil Engineers in Great Britain and Ireland: Vol 1: 1500 to 1830. Thomas Telford. ISBN 978-0-7277-2939-2.
- Taylor, Mike (2010). The Sheffield and South Yorkshire Navigation. The History Press. ISBN 978-0-7524-2128-5.
- Willan, Prof T. S. (1965). The Early History of the Don Navigation. Manchester University Press.
