= HM Prison Doncaster =

Men's prison in Doncaster, England

Coordinates: 53.5248°N 1.1458°W

HM Prison & YOI Doncaster
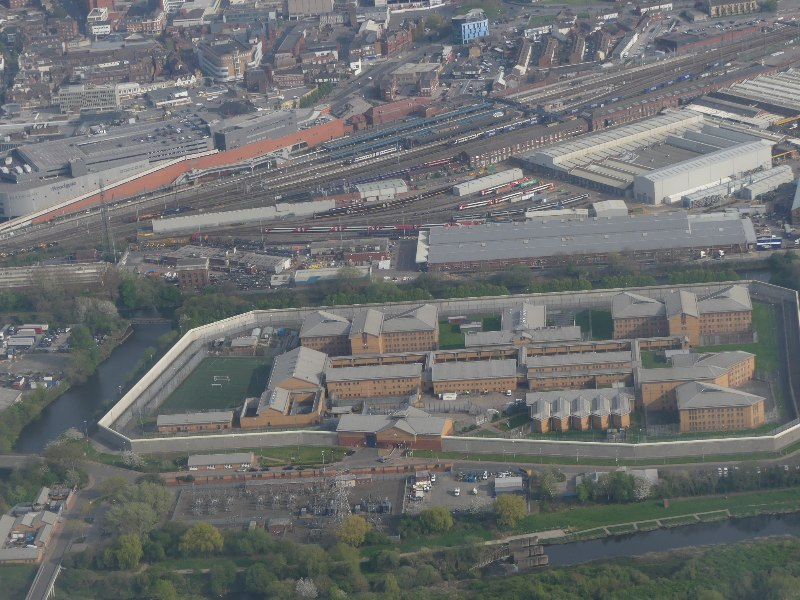
- Interactive map of HM Prison & YOI Doncaster
- Location: Doncaster, England
- Status: Operational
- Security class: Category B
- Capacity: 1,145 (February 2009)
- Opened: 1994
- Managed by: Serco Prison Services
- Governor: Mr Ormerod

HM Prison & YOI Doncaster, is a Category B men's private prison, located in the Marshgate area of Doncaster in South Yorkshire, England. The prison is operated by Serco.

== History ==
Doncaster Prison was built on the site of Doncaster Power Station, and opened in 1994. Management of the prison was originally contracted out by the Home Office to Premier Prison Services Ltd, a joint venture between Serco and US company Wackenhut Corrections. In 2005, Serco bought out Wackenhut and now runs the prison alone.

In 1999, the then Home Secretary, Jack Straw, was criticised for awarding Doncaster Prison a Charter Mark, when it emerged that Doncaster had the worst suicide record of any prison in England and Wales. Jack Straw defended his decision as an "unfortunate coincidence of timing".

In 2004, Her Majesty's Chief Inspector of Prisons accused Serco of "institutional meanness" at Doncaster Prison, and described conditions there as "squalid". Four years later, an unannounced inspection of the prison found inmates sleeping in toilets because of overcrowding.

== The prison today ==
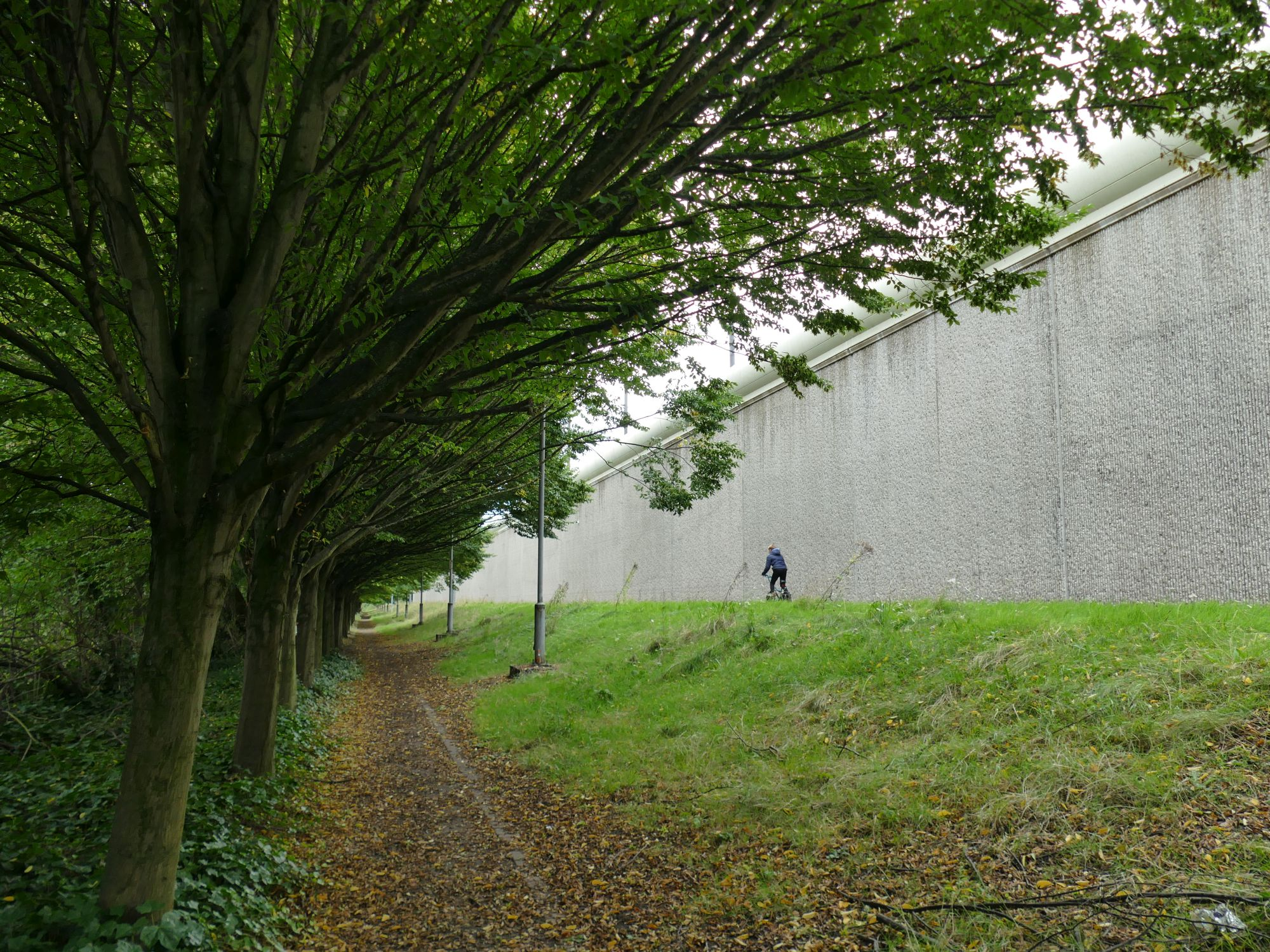
West wall of HMP Doncaster

Classified as a 'local remand' prison, Doncaster can hold 1,145 inmates as of August 2007, considerably more than its original design envisaged. Accommodation at the prison comprises three houseblocks, each houseblock has 4 wings and each wing can hold a maximum of 90 prisoners. The Health Care Centre has 29 beds for in-patients on one floor with a further 36 beds on the lower floor for enhanced workers.

The prison provides education – literacy, numeracy, information technology and vocational skills - healthcare, drug and alcohol counselling, and offending behaviour courses.

Doncaster has links with the local community in order to reduce the chances of former prisoners re-offending. Schemes have been set up with local employers, landlords and other agencies to try to ensure ex-prisoners have a successful resettlement into the community. The prison also has links with a ‘halfway house’ in a nearby town where prisoners can live after release as they adjust to life beyond the prison wall.

The prison has been nicknamed "Doncatraz" by inmates and locals, in reference to the famous Alcatraz prison, in San Francisco Bay. The prison lies between branches of the River Don, River Don Navigation and River Cheswold and appears to be on an 'island'.

Doncaster Prison is overcrowded and frequently two prisoners are forced to share a cell designed for one. In July 2018 1,087 prisoners fitted into spaces designed for 738. Overcrowding leads to increased assaults on staff and on other prisoners.

=== Controversial death ===
Jordan Hullock aged 19 died while imprisoned at Doncaster prison in 2015. Hullock had a number of physical conditions but died of meningitis; his health was for several days so bad that staff raised concerns with senior management but little was done. Nottinghamshire NHS Foundation Trust was responsible for prison healthcare at the time. Hullock had a heart condition which was at first overlooked though this information was given to the prison. He stated he felt unwell, he stopped eating and drinking and became dehydrated, incontinent and immobile, and fell to the floor several times. It appears the prison treated Hullock's condition as psychiatric, ignoring his raised body temperature and low blood pressure.

It was a week before a GP saw Hullock, after which he was transferred urgently to hospital where he died. When Hullock stopped communicating his mother phoned and emailed the prison many times but this did not help. An inquest jury found the cause of death was Bacterial Meningitis, pneumonia and his heart condition (Aortic Stenosis). The jury decided prison staff should have done more to get a GP to see Hullock earlier. The jury also stated, “The facts show serious failures in the medical attention given to the deceased following his collapse on 23 June and prior to being seen by the doctor on 24 June 2015.”

Hullock's mother, Marie Hullock, said, “Not being informed of our child's admission to hospital denied us of the chance to say goodbye. We cannot believe the inhuman and degrading treatment he received while in Doncaster prison. Four years on we are still devastated and angry that we have lost our loving son. We have persisted with this battle to try to get some answers and justice, not only for Jordan losing his life, but for the days and days of suffering he endured whilst he was ridiculously poorly in HMP Doncaster."

== Notable former inmates ==
- Prince Naseem Hamed, former boxing world champion, jailed for driving dangerously.
- Baron Ahmed, a member of the House of Lords, jailed for driving dangerously.

== Film and TV links ==
- During one episode of the Channel 4 cookery show The F-Word in 2006, Gordon Ramsay cooked in Doncaster Prison for its inmates. He challenged prisoner Kieron Tarff to an onion-chopping race, which Ramsay lost. The chef was so impressed by Tarff that he offered him a job at his restaurant when he would be released in 2007.
