= River Cheswold =

River in South Yorkshire, England

River Cheswold River Chelwald Chelwald Stream
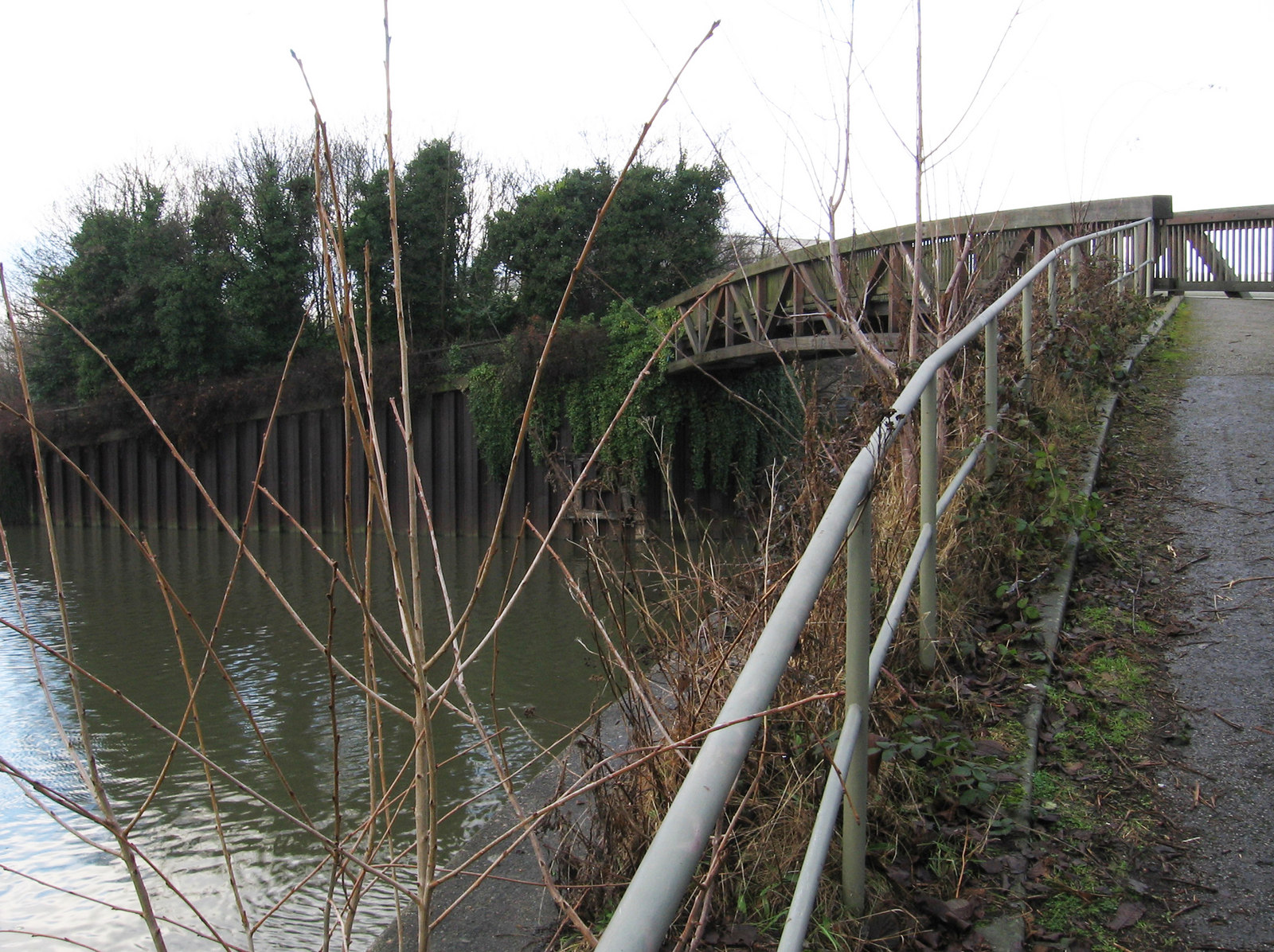
- Footbridge over the River Cheswold

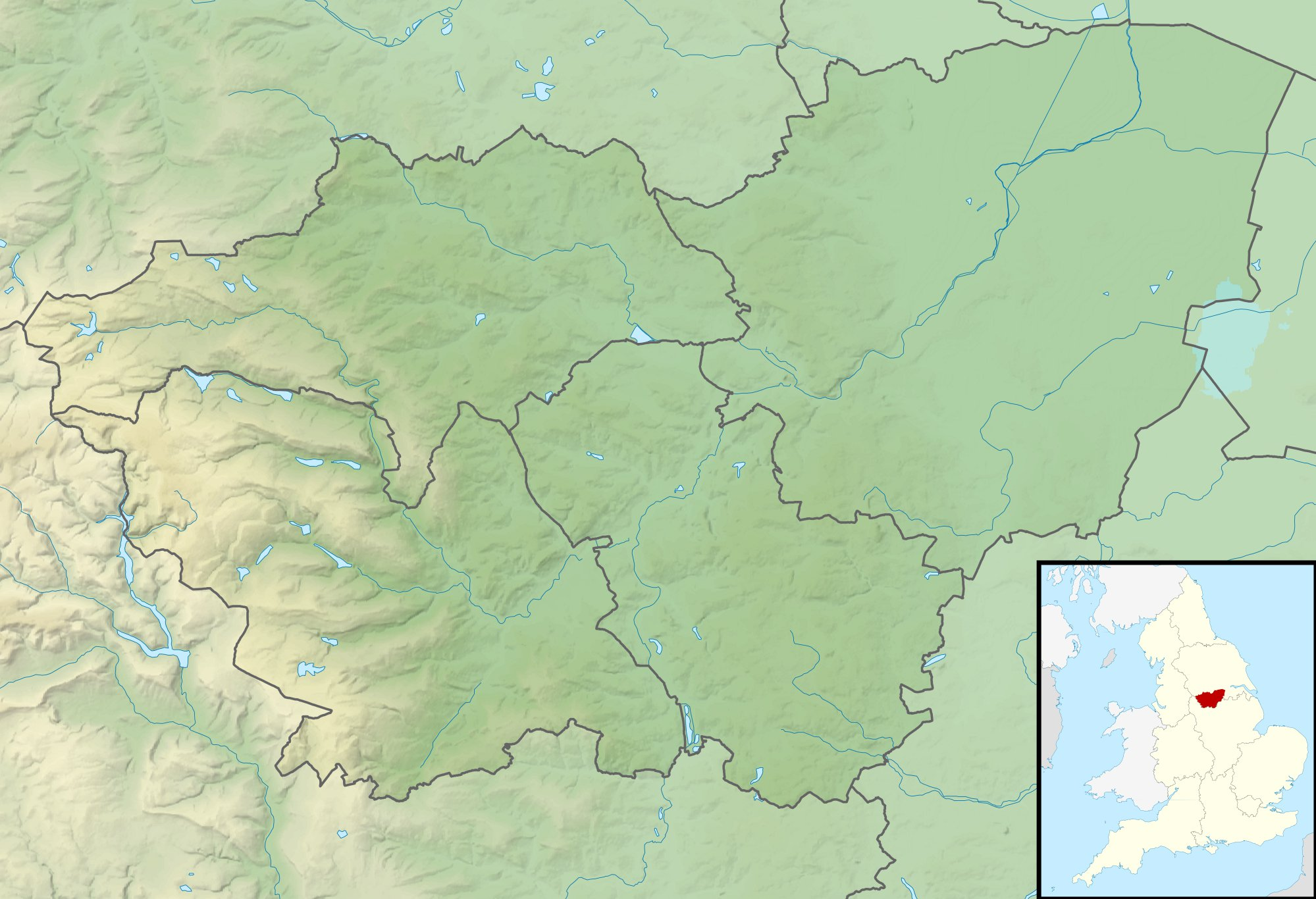
- Location within South Yorkshire

Physical characteristics
- Source
  - coordinates: 53.525°N 1.142°W
- Mouth
  - coordinates: 53.527°N 1.145°W
- Length: 0.5 miles (0.8 km) (original arm)

Basin features
- River system: River Don

The River Cheswold is a short river in Doncaster, South Yorkshire, England. The river originally formed a southern cut of the River Don, and passed underneath what is Friargate. The flow direction of the river has been changed, and it has been heavily modified, largely being culverted as it passes underneath the railway and bus stations. The river is sometimes labelled the shortest named river in Britain.

== History ==
Although now largely culverted, the Cheswold stretches across the northern part of Doncaster town, from the Don Foundry southwards, then under the railway lines at Doncaster railway station, before turning northwards past St Georges Church and thence following the course of what is now, the River Don Navigation. (Note: In 1853, the parish church of St George burnt down. One of the fire engines responding to the fire was situated in the vicarage grounds near the Cheswold stream, so that it could use the water from that watercourse.) Originally, the Cheswold was an arm of the River Don, the southernmost arm that flowed south and eastwards across the northern part of Doncaster. It met the original course of the River Don in the Friendly Street/Low Fishergate area, although it is unsure whether or not the route was a natural part of the Don, or if it was channelled through the area. The Grey Friars had a house to the east of what is now Frenchgate near to the Cheswold after which Friar's Bridge is named. Frenchgate was historically the route of the Great North Road. A map of 1767 shows the layout of Doncaster which was largely unchanged since Medieval times, and the writer suggests that the Cheswold was the original course of the River Don, but a northern cut, the present named River Don, was made to feed the mills north of the town. Friar's Bridge over the Cheswold was replaced by a single span bridge in 1740. It has been suggested that during the Medieval period, craft which managed to make the "dangerous passage" up the Don River from the Humber Estuary, would have moored in the Cheswold, which was formerly the most important part of the town, and the highest navigable point on the River Don system.

The Roman Fort, and later on the same site, Doncaster Castle, are both thought to have been built with the northern wall adjacent to the Cheswold, which formed a natural defence, and thus also developing the town's civilian quarter near to the River Cheswold. The ditch around the east wall of the castle was later thought to have been filled by water seeping out of the Cheswold. By the 13th century, when all defensive structures had been abandoned, houses fronted alongside the river, with backyards extending to the riverside. By 1703, before the Don was diverted, the Cheswold was used to supply water to the town. A waterwheel had been installed south of Friar's Bridge on Frenchgate, where the road crossed the river. The wheel was 28 feet (8.5 m) in diameter and 3 feet 10 inches (1.17 m) wide. However, the water supplied was muddy and polluted, particularly from sewage deposited upstream, so many wells in the town were relied upon for fresh water. Water from the Cheswold continued to supply parts of Doncaster up until 1916.

In the 1850s, a weir was installed opposite the Don Foundry at the northern end of the Cheswold arm. Additionally, underneath the railway lines, a culverted archway, some 17 feet 6 inches (5.33 m) wide was built. Besides the railway structures, a bus station was built over the eastern side adjacent to the railway station in 1956. The remaining stretch which is not culverted connects the Don Navigation with the River Don. The flow of water in this channel has been reversed - originally it flowed south-east, but now flows north-west as a drain for the Don Navigation. The northern cut of the Don created Crimpsall Island, which housed Doncaster Power Station, which took water from the Cheswold for its power generation. The site of the power station, on an island between the Don, the Don Navigation, and the Cheswold, is now the location of HMP Doncaster. Due to the prison's location between several watercourses, it is known as Doncatraz, after the prison in San Francisco Bay named Alcatraz.

Although culverted, the river still loops underneath Frenchgate and discharges into the River Don (New Cut), being some 0.5 miles (0.8 km) in length; reputedly the shortest river in Britain. The culverted river flows underneath both the railway station, and the bus station, the latter being built in 1956.

== Etymology ==
The first known record of the river is in a document from 1279, where it is described as Flum de Cheswalt. Various spellings have been used since then such as River Chelwald, Chelwald Stream, and Cheswalt. Smith asserts that the origin of the name is uncertain, with the possibility of it being the name of a person. The most likely derivation is that of the Old English Ceosol (gravel) and Wald/Walte meaning a wall.
