= Doncaster Power Station =

Two former coal-fired electricity generating stations

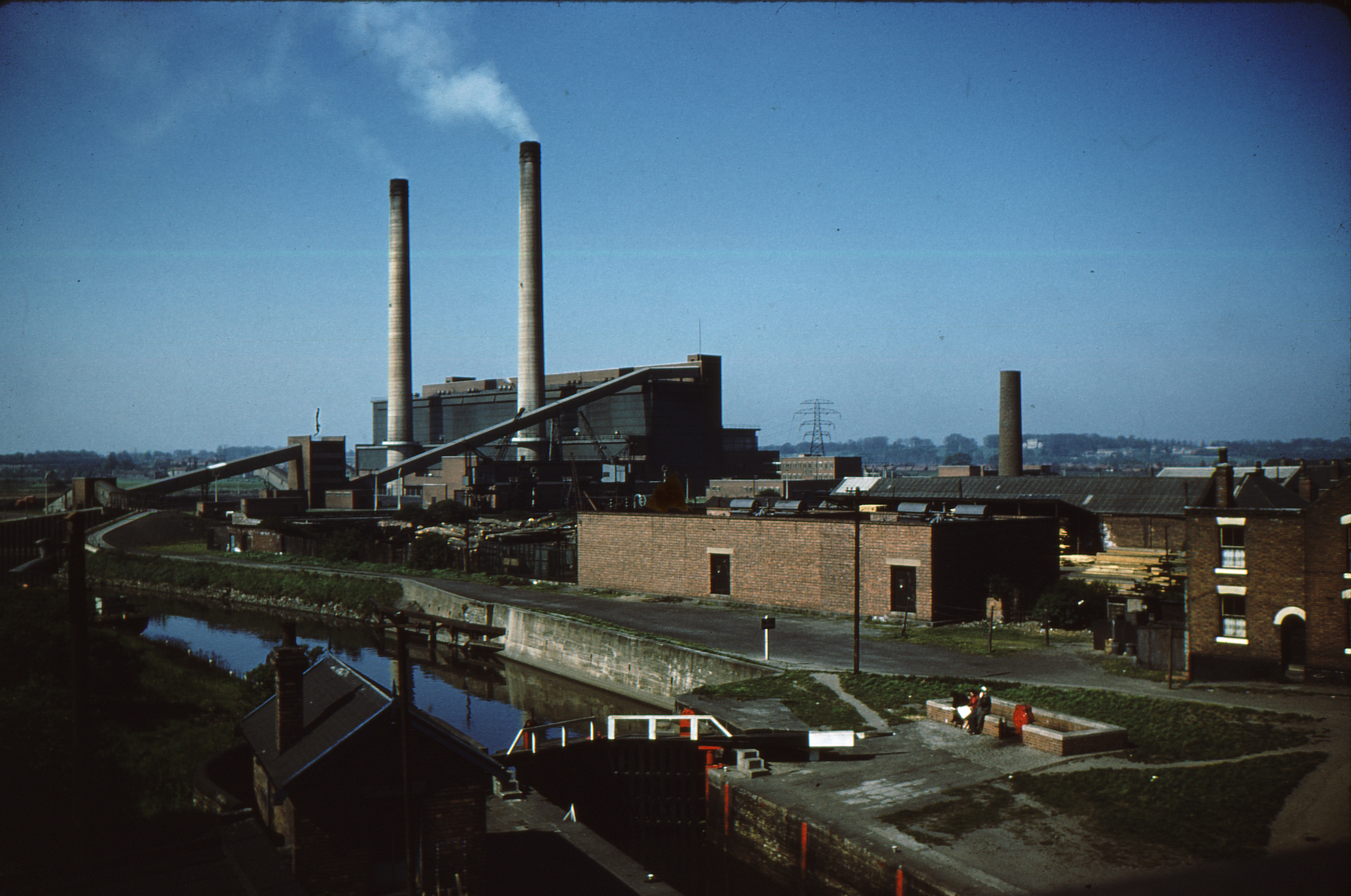
- Doncaster power station in 1957
- Official name: Doncaster power station
- Country: England
- Location: South Yorkshire
- Coordinates: 53.5242°N 1.1462°W
- Status: Decommissioned and demolished
- Construction began: A 1899; B 1951
- Commission date: A 1900; B 1953
- Decommission date: A 1958; B 1983
- Owners: Doncaster Corporation (1900–1948); British Electricity Authority (1948–1955); Central Electricity Authority (1955–1957); Central Electricity Generating Board (1958–1983)
- Operator: As owner

Thermal power station
- Primary fuel: Coal
- Turbine technology: Steam turbines
- Chimneys: B 2
- Cooling towers: None
- Cooling source: River water

Power generation
- Units operational: A see text; B 4 × 40 MW (1956) 1 × 40 MW, 3 × 30 MW (1971)
- Make and model: B GEC 30 MW and Brush 30 MW
- Units decommissioned: All
- Nameplate capacity: 122 MW
- Annual net output: A 5.83 GWh (1923); B 346 GWh (1957) 490 GWh (1972)

External links
- Commons: Related media on Commons

Doncaster Power Station refers to two coal-fired electricity generating stations situated in the centre of Doncaster in South Yorkshire, England. Doncaster A provided electricity to the town from 1900 to 1958, and the B station from 1953 to 1983.

== Doncaster A station ==
Doncaster Corporation was granted the Doncaster Corporation Electric Lighting Order 1898 by the Board of Trade, this permitted the corporation to supply electricity to the town. A power station was built in 1900 in Grey Friars' Road (53°31′34″N 1°08′18″W) near the River Don New Cut canal which provide access for coal barges and water for condensing steam in the plant. The station provided the electricity supply to the tram system from 1902.

=== Specification ===
By 1923 the plant comprised one 1,100 kW and two 3,000 kW turbo-alternators which provided a 3-phase, 50 Hz AC supply at 3,000 Volts. The DC plant comprised two 200 kW and one 300 kW reciprocating engines plus one 650 kW steam turbine providing a 230 and 460 Volt DC supply plus a 550 Volt DC traction current. The total installed generating capacity was 8,350 MW.

=== Operations ===
In 1923 the power station generated 5.83 GWh and sold 4.236 GWh which produced an income of £49,448 and a net surplus of revenue over expenses of £26,727. There were 6,041 connected consumers, an increase from 4,939 two years previously.

In 1927 the Central Electricity Board (CEB) assumed responsibility across the country for directing the operation of ‘selected’ power stations and paying for their operation. Doncaster power station became a selected station. Doncaster Corporation had the right to buy the electricity they required from the Board. The CEB built the first stages of the National Grid between 1927 and 1933.

Upon nationalisation of the British electricity supply industry in 1948 the ownership of Doncaster power station was vested in the British Electricity Authority, and subsequently the Central Electricity Authority and the Central Electricity Generating Board (CEGB). At the same time the electricity distribution and sales responsibilities of the Doncaster electricity undertaking were transferred to the Yorkshire Electricity Board.

By 1954 the generating capacity of the station was 10 MW. In the final years the A station produced the following output:

Electricity output of Doncaster A
Year	Output GWh
1946	13.64
1953/4	14.8
1954/5	4.87
1955/6	4.22
1956/7	3.24
1957/8	0.03

The A station was decommissioned in 1958 and was subsequently demolished. The site is now a 33 kV sub-station.

== Doncaster B station ==
Doncaster B station was built by the British Electricity Authority and was opened in 1953. It was located on Crimpsall Island, surrounded by the River Don and the Sheffield and South Yorkshire Navigation (S&SYN). It received significant quantities of its coal by boat, to its own staithe, using the S&SYN.

=== Specification ===
The plant at the new station included eight Mitchell boilers each with an output capacity of 180,000 pounds per hour (22.7 kg/s) of steam. Four of the boilers delivered steam at 625 psi and 865 °F (43.1 bar and 463 °C). The other four supplied steam at 632 psi and 865 °F (43.6 bar and 463 °C). Condensing of steam and cooling were by circulating river water.

There were two GEC 30 MW turbo-alternators, and two Brush 30 MW turbo-alternators, all generating at 11.6 kV and switched at 66 kV.

The first generator was commissioned September 1953, the second July 1954, the third set February 1956 and the final set in June 1956.

=== Operations ===
The electricity output of the station in its first years was:

Electricity output of Doncaster B
Year	Output GWh
1953/4	31.51
1954/5	307.44
1955/6	309.15
1956/7	372.06
1957/8	345.88
1960/1	366.99
1961/2	474.48
1962/3	482.34
1966/7	346.06

There was a 132 kV electricity sub-station in the north-west of the ‘B’ power station site. This provided a connection to the National Grid.

By 1971 the station comprised one 40 MW and three 30 MW turbo-alternators giving an installed output of 130 MW. The turbines were fed from boilers having a total output capacity of 1,440,000 lb/h (181.4 kg/s) of steam at 600 psi (41.4 bar) and 454 °C.

In 1971–2 the annual output from the station was 489.696 GWh. In 1978–9 the output was 125.5 GWh and in 1981–2 the annual output was 2.063 GWh.

Doncaster power station closed on 31 October 1983 when it had a generating capacity of 122 MW. HM Prison Doncaster, a prison operated by Serco, has been built on the power station's site. The 132 kV electricity sub-station on the site is extant (2020).
