= Peter Lynch (disambiguation) =

Peter Lynch (born 1944) is an American stock investor.

Peter Lynch may also refer to:

- Peter Lynch (director), Canadian filmmaker
- Peter Lynch (meteorologist), Irish mathematician and meteorologist
- Pete Lynch (musician) (born 1980), American singer and songwriter
- Peter Lynch (politician) (died 1967), Irish Senator
- Peter Lynch (rioter) (died 2024)
- Peter Lynch (runner) (born 1997), Irish long-distance runner
- Suicide of Peter Lynch, 61 year old British prisoner
