= 2024 United Kingdom riots =

Civil unrest from 30 July to 5 August 2024

- Part of far-right politics in the United Kingdom
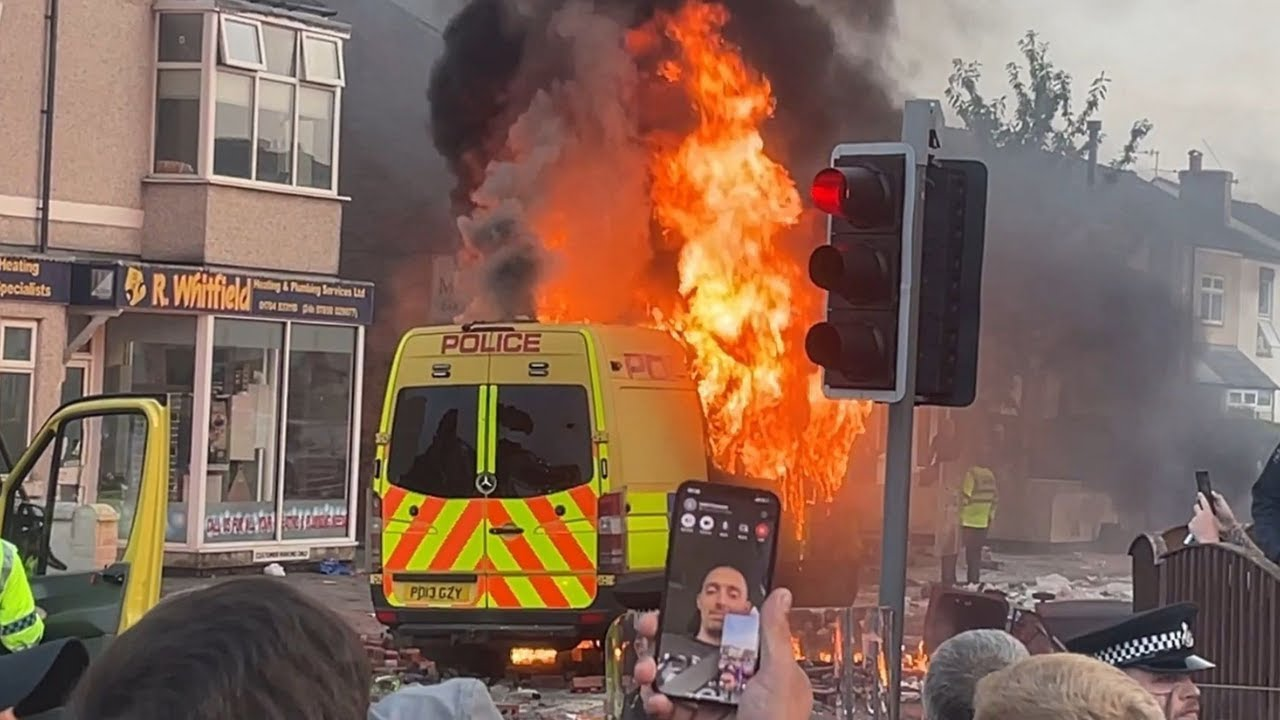
- A police van on fire during the 30 July race riots in Southport
- Date: 30 July – 5 August 2024 (6 days) (Note: Counter-protests and minor unrest continued until 10 August.)
- Location: Various towns and cities in England and Northern Ireland (Note: Aldershot, Belfast, Birmingham, Blackpool, Bolton, Bristol, Hartlepool, Hull, Leeds, Liverpool, London, Manchester, Middlesbrough, Nottingham, Plymouth, Rotherham, Solihull, Southport, Stoke-on-Trent, Sunderland, Tamworth and Weymouth)
- Caused by: 2024 Southport stabbings; Islamophobia; Racism; Nationalism; Disinformation; Misinformation; Anti-immigration sentiment
- Methods: Rioting; protest; vandalism; looting; arson; violent disorder; racist attacks

Parties
Far-right anti-immigration protesters: English Defence League supporters; Patriotic Alternative; Britain First; Convicted members of National Action; Ulster Defence Association; Unidentified groups from the Republic of Ireland; Supported by: National Front; UK Independence Party; British Movement; Terrorgram affiliates; Democratic Football Lads Alliance; Active Club England; Various football hooligan firms	Government of the United Kingdom: Various police forces (Note: Avon and Somerset Police, Cheshire Constabulary, Cleveland Police, Devon and Cornwall Police, Dorset Police, Greater Manchester Police, Hampshire and Isle of Wight Constabulary, Lancashire Constabulary, Merseyside Police, Metropolitan Police, Northumbria Police, North Wales Police, South Yorkshire Police, Staffordshire Police, West Midlands Police, and additional police forces providing support. Including those in Wales, such as North Wales Police, South Wales Police, and Dyfed-Powys Police.); Northern Ireland Executive; Police Service of Northern Ireland; Supported by: Police Scotland; Various local and regional authorities of England	Counter-protesters: Unaffiliated local residents; Stand Up to Racism; Assorted local anti-fascist and anti-racist groups; Muslim youth and men; Supported by: (Palestine) Pro-Palestinian activists; Northern Ireland Public Service Alliance

Casualties
- Injuries: 361+ officers injured; 7+ police dogs (Note: Southport: 3, Tamworth: 3, Rotherham: >1); 1+ police horses (Note: Rotherham: >1); 1+ protester (Note: Sheffield: 1); 1+ counter-protester (Note: Plymouth: 1)
- Arrested: 1,840 (1,103 charged)

From 30 July to 5 August 2024, far-right anti-immigration protests and riots occurred in England and Northern Ireland, within the United Kingdom, following the 2024 Southport stabbings, a targeted stabbing attack on 29 July 2024 at a dance class in Southport, England, which resulted in the deaths of three young girls. The riots took place amid false claims circulated by far-right groups, that the perpetrator of the attack was a Muslim and an asylum seeker, in addition to broader Islamophobic, racist, and anti-immigrant sentiments. The disorder, which involved racist attacks, arson and looting, was the largest incident of social unrest in England since 2011. By 8 August, at least 177 individuals had been imprisoned in connection to the unrest, with sentences averaging around two years and ranging up to nine years. The following month, 1,280 arrests and nearly 800 charges had been made; as of July 2025, the numbers of arrests and charges stood at 1,840 and 1,103, respectively.

The race riots began in Southport, just a few streets away from where the attack took place. A demonstration outside the Southport Mosque quickly turned violent and protesters attacked police officers, injuring over fifty, burned a police van, and attacked the mosque. Over the following days the unrest spread to other towns and cities in England and to Belfast in Northern Ireland. On 31 July, over 100 protesters were arrested in London, and demonstrations occurred in Manchester, Hartlepool, and Aldershot. On 2 August, rioting took place in Sunderland, where a Citizens Advice bureau was set on fire and police officers were injured and several people were arrested. The most severe rioting took place over the weekend of 3–4 August, when anti-immigration protesters clashed with police and counter-protesters, attacked homes and businesses owned by immigrants, and attacked hotels housing asylum seekers. From 6 August the unrest began to abate; counter-protests consistently and considerably outnumbered far-right protesters, and were followed by large anti-racist rallies across the country on 7 August.

The riots had limited formal organisation; instead, rioters assembled around individual far-right social media personalities with the aid of far-right Telegram group chats affiliated with Active Club England, the terrorgram network, and football hooliganism firms. Groups involved in the riots included supporters of the defunct Islamophobic group English Defence League (EDL), including its former leader Tommy Robinson, members of the neo-Nazi hate group Patriotic Alternative, and the fascist political party Britain First. The riots were also supported by the neo-Nazi organisation British Movement and the far-right political party National Front. Rioters clashed with local Muslims and counter-protesters, who were mobilised by Stand Up to Racism and other anti-fascist and anti-racist groups.

== Background ==
Map of riots, protests and attacks
Click the fullscreen button in the top right for a clearer view and click individual marks for more details
Riots and disorder
Peaceful protests
Attacks on hotels housing asylum seekers

On 29 July 2024 a knife attack took place at a Taylor Swift-themed children's yoga and dance workshop. Three children were killed and eight other children were injured, with five of them in critical condition. Two adults at the event were also critically injured.

Following the stabbing, the police said the name being circulated online was not that of the suspected attacker. Misinformation and disinformation, including false claims about the suspect's identity, nationality, religion and immigration status, were circulated on social media by high-profile far-right accounts, including by Tommy Robinson, a far-right activist who founded the now-disbanded anti-Islam English Defence League (EDL) in 2009. The false claim that the perpetrator was named "Ali Al-Shakati" is believed to have originated from the X (formerly Twitter) account of an anti-lockdown campaigner and gained a greater audience when repeated by the website Channel3Now, a website known for spreading fake news. Russia was accused of being behind a deliberate disinformation campaign. The National Crime Agency and Department for Science, Innovation and Technology later investigated these claims.

A newly created Southport-themed Telegram group became inundated with misinformation, including from the far-right National Front, prior to dissemination on social media platforms. The Institute for Strategic Dialogue stated that the now-deleted "Southport Wake Up" group with 14,000 members on Telegram became integral in organising and promoting the subsequent riots, and inciting hatred and violence. Disinformation was also spread on social media by the neo-Nazi group British Movement, and accelerationist Telegram channels with links to the proscribed terror groups Atomwaffen Division and National Action were used to co-ordinate and organise the riots.

Merseyside Police attempted to quell speculation by confirming that the name being circulated was not connected to the case and was not the suspect. The police initially released the information that the suspect was a male, aged seventeen, from Banks in Lancashire, though born in Cardiff. It was later reported that the suspect was a British citizen born to Rwandan parents, that he had moved to the Southport area in 2013, and that he had no known links to Islam. Subsequent court proceedings and the Southport Inquiry found that he had downloaded an Al-Qaeda training manual and produced ricin, but there was insufficient evidence to support the claim that the attack was motivated by Islamic fundamentalism, or by any political, religious or ideological cause. The spread of misinformation has widely been given as the cause of the Southport riots.

In a separate event, a woman was stabbed in Stirling on 3 August 2024. Tommy Robinson falsely claimed on social media that an "alleged Muslim" had been involved in an incident in which three women had been stabbed. Other accounts spread the misinformation, contributing to tensions. A man was arrested by the police, who described him as white and local to the area. The release of these details was unusual and done to curb misinformation.

== Timeline ==
=== 30 July ===
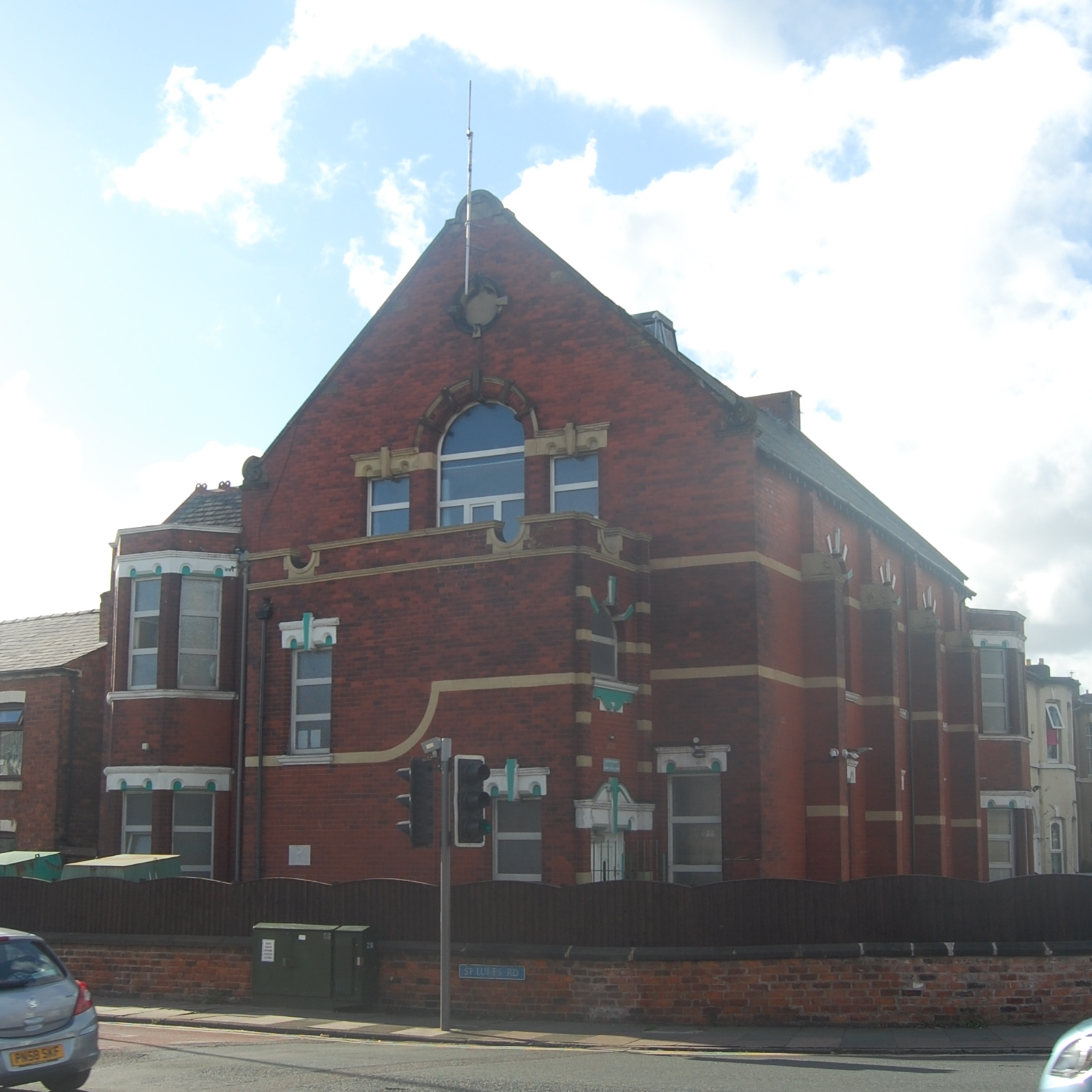
Southport Mosque, location of the first riot

At approximately 20:05 BST, hundreds of protesters gathered outside Southport Mosque chanting, "No surrender!" and "English till I die!" Within several minutes, protesters clashed with police. Protesters barricaded themselves and shouted "Tommy Robinson", a far-right activist who founded the EDL. Robinson had been arrested and then released two days prior, before he fled the country, failing to appear at a High Court hearing to which he had been summonsed for alleged contempt of court.

By 20:37, protesters began throwing objects at the mosque and police, leaving one officer injured. A police van was set alight as police deployed smoke canisters. Merseyside Police requested officers from Greater Manchester Police, Cheshire Constabulary, Lancashire Police, and North Wales Police. Riot police cleared the area near the mosque by 21:14 and protesters began dispersing shortly after that as night fell. By 23:14, the riot had ended. A local corner shop was damaged.

The Merseyside Police Federation said that over fifty officers were injured at the Southport incident, with North West Ambulance Service reporting that twenty-seven were hospitalised and twelve were discharged at the scene. Merseyside Police stated that eight officers were seriously injured and three police dogs were wounded. One man from Standish was arrested on suspicion of possessing a bladed article. Police put in place a 24-hour Section 60 Order giving officers further stop-and-search authority, and a Section 34 Order, allowing police to direct people who are engaging in certain activities away from the area. Merseyside Police deployed additional officers after the riot, and ambulance resources remained.

The following day Hope Not Hate warned of the possibility of further demonstrations by far-right groups in several cities across the country. Concerns of further violence were echoed by Merseyside Police.

ITV News later reported that convicted member of banned neo-Nazi group National Action, Matthew Hankinson, had been one of the protesters.

=== 31 July ===
In London, the Metropolitan Police established public order conditions for a protest dubbed "Enough is Enough", the slogan of Patriotic Alternative, where far-right demonstrators clashed with police near Downing Street on 31 July. The Metropolitan Police said that 111 people were arrested for offences including assaults on officers, possession of knives and offensive weapons and violent disorder.

On the evening of 31 July, a group of approximately 40 demonstrators gathered outside a Holiday Inn in the Newton Heath area of Manchester, which was purportedly housing asylum seekers. Chants were heard of the group exclaiming "we want our country back", a phrase associated with far-right groups in the UK. Two people were arrested.

Demonstrations also broke out in the County Durham town of Hartlepool on the same evening. Objects including eggs and glass bottles were thrown at the police in response to the latter's riot shields. Several police officers were injured and a police car was set alight. Eight people were arrested.

There was also a protest outside a hotel being used by the government to house asylum seekers in Aldershot. Hampshire's police and crime commissioner Donna Jones described "mob-type" behaviour, and Hampshire Constabulary reported a crowd of 200 people, with a minority throwing objects and subjecting people to racial abuse.

The organiser of a march in Middlesbrough was arrested by Cleveland Police on suspicion of possessing a firearm with intent to cause fear of violence.

=== 2 August ===
On the evening of 2 August, protesters gathered in Sunderland's Keel Square for a march around the city centre. Mounted officers from Northumbria Police attended the demonstration along with officers in riot gear. Police and protesters clashed outside a mosque in St Mark's Road after some of the marchers attempted to approach the building. The protesters chanted "save our kids" and "we want our country back", as well as slogans in support of Tommy Robinson, and Islamophobic slurs. An Uber taxi was burnt and shops looted. Sunderland Central police station was set alight, and trains to Sunderland station were cancelled or diverted to St Peter's. Four officers were hospitalised and 12 people were arrested.

Around a hundred protesters shouting anti-immigrant slogans gathered in Liverpool on the same evening.

=== 3 August ===
On 3 August, numerous far-right rallies and counter-protests occurred in England. In Leeds, approximately 150 protesters chanted slogans such as "You're not English anymore", with around 250 counter-protesters chanting "Say it loud, say it clear, refugees are welcome here". In Manchester, 150 protesters took part in the "Enough is Enough" protest, while 350 locals turned out for the "Stop the Far Right" counter-protest. In Nottingham, clashes were reported between opposing groups of protesters.

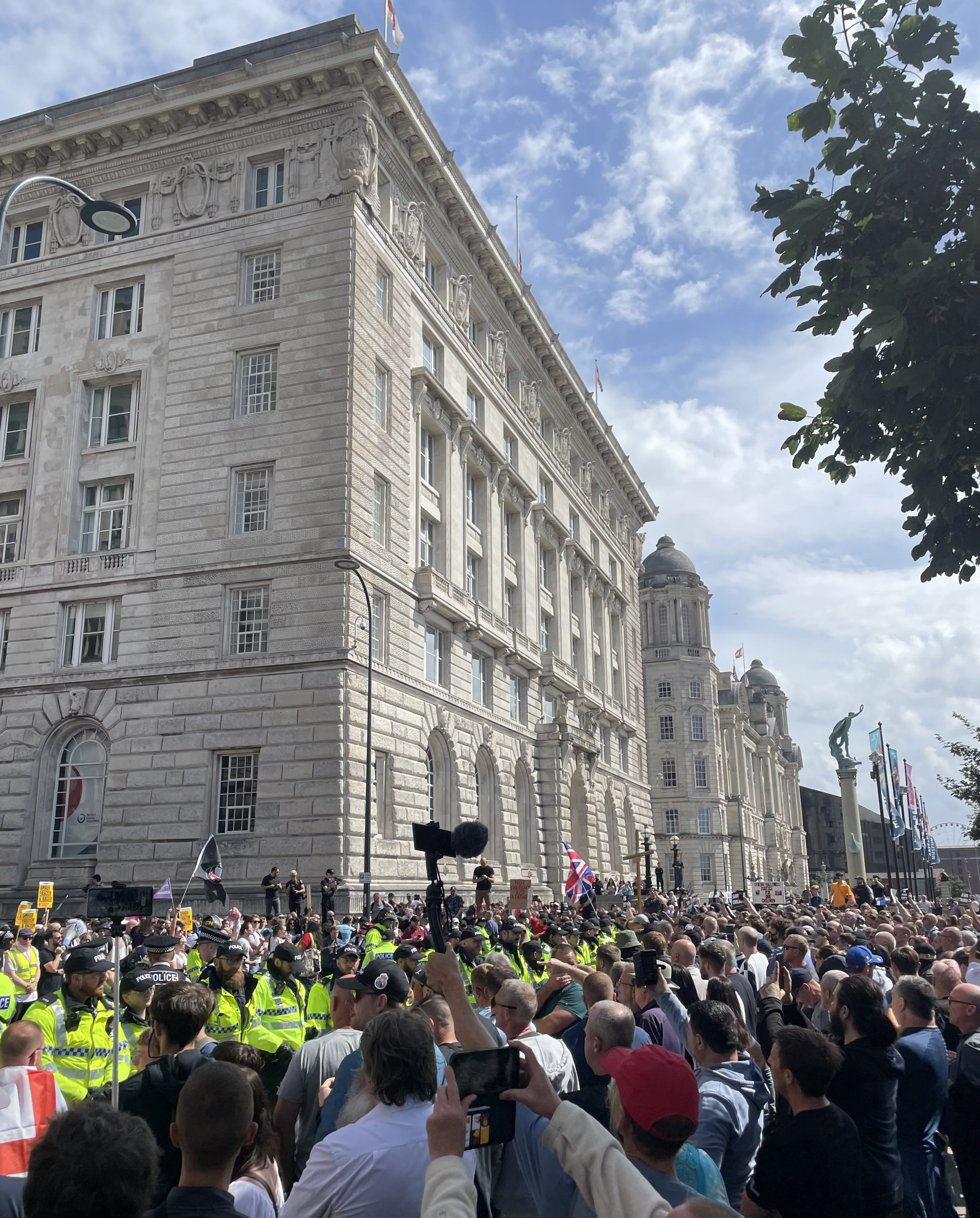
Protest in Liverpool on 3 August

In Liverpool, two groups who had been taking part in separate protests joined up at the Pier Head before moving on to The Strand and Church Street. Many shops were damaged and looted as Spellow Library, a community hub in Walton was torched and wheelie bins set alight. A police officer was assaulted after being pushed off his motorbike and another hit in the head by a chair as protesters threw bottles, bricks and a flare at officers. 23 people were arrested in relation to the disorder as two police officers were hospitalised with a broken jaw and broken nose respectively.

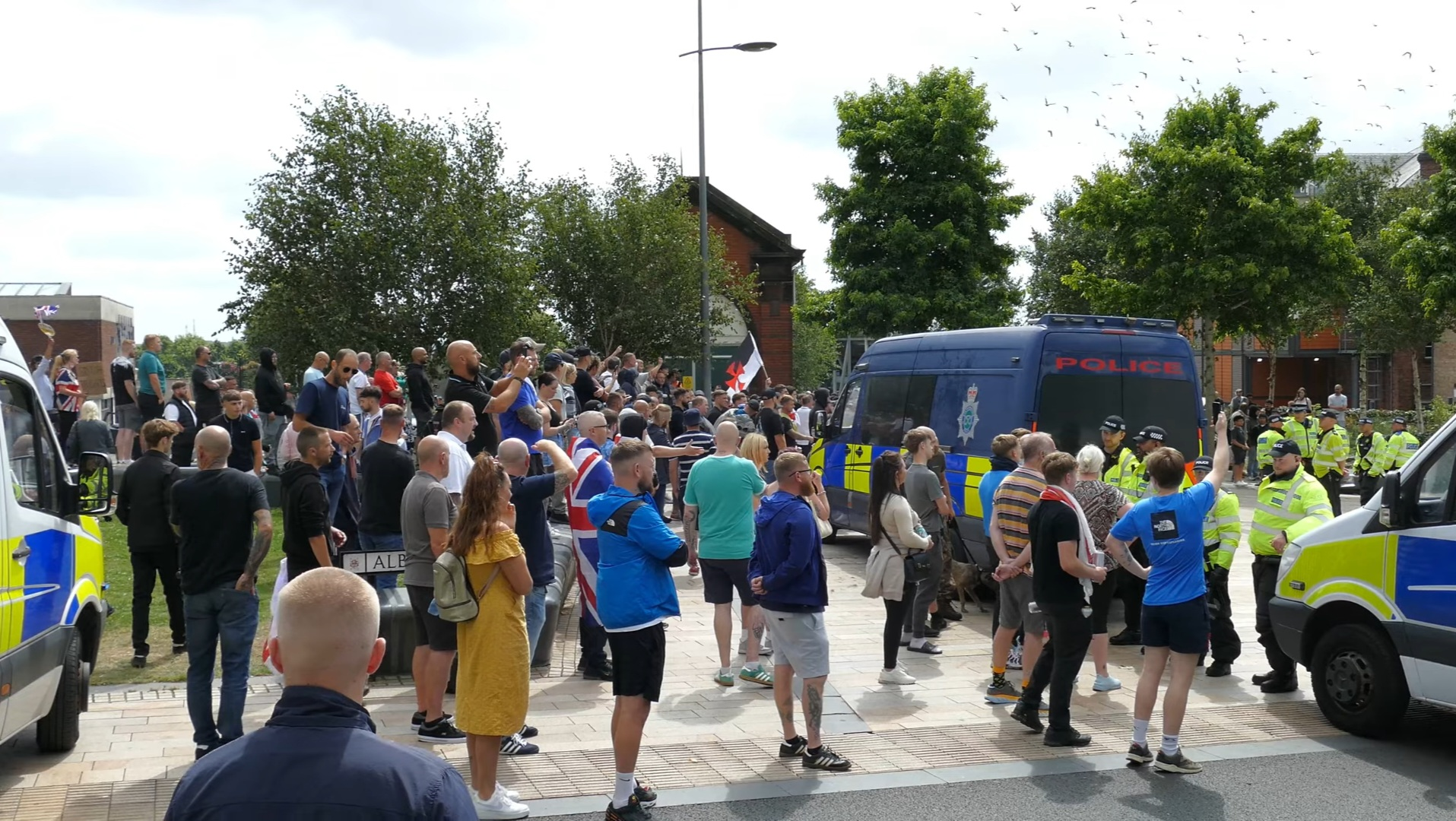
Protest in Stoke-on-Trent on 3 August

In Stoke-on-Trent, a far-right march clashed with local counter-protest groups, primarily made up of Muslim men and youth, outside a local mosque, with missiles thrown at riot police. Three officers were injured and 10 people were arrested.

In Manchester, 'scuffles' with police led to two arrests. Two people were arrested in Leicester city centre and a protest on The Headrow in Leeds led to one arrest.

Twenty arrests were made in Blackpool after violent disorder broke out amongst nearly 1,000 protesters, with bottles and other projectiles thrown at police. Attendees of the nearby annual punk festival Rebellion formed an anti-fascist counter-protest leading to a stand-off in which chairs, bottles and planks of wood were thrown. Police reported there had also been "minor disruption" in Blackburn and Preston.

Police in Bristol made multiple arrests and closed roads after protesters gathered in Castle Park, where they clashed with counter-protesters who outnumbered them. Anti-racist protesters left Castle Park and linked arms with others in front of the Mercure Hotel after receiving information that far-right protesters might target the location, as it housed asylum seekers. The anti-racist protesters arrived at the hotel shortly before the far-right group and the police. The protesters faced violent attempts by the far-right to force their way through the protective line and into the hotel. Avon and Somerset Police arrested 14 people in relation to the protests.

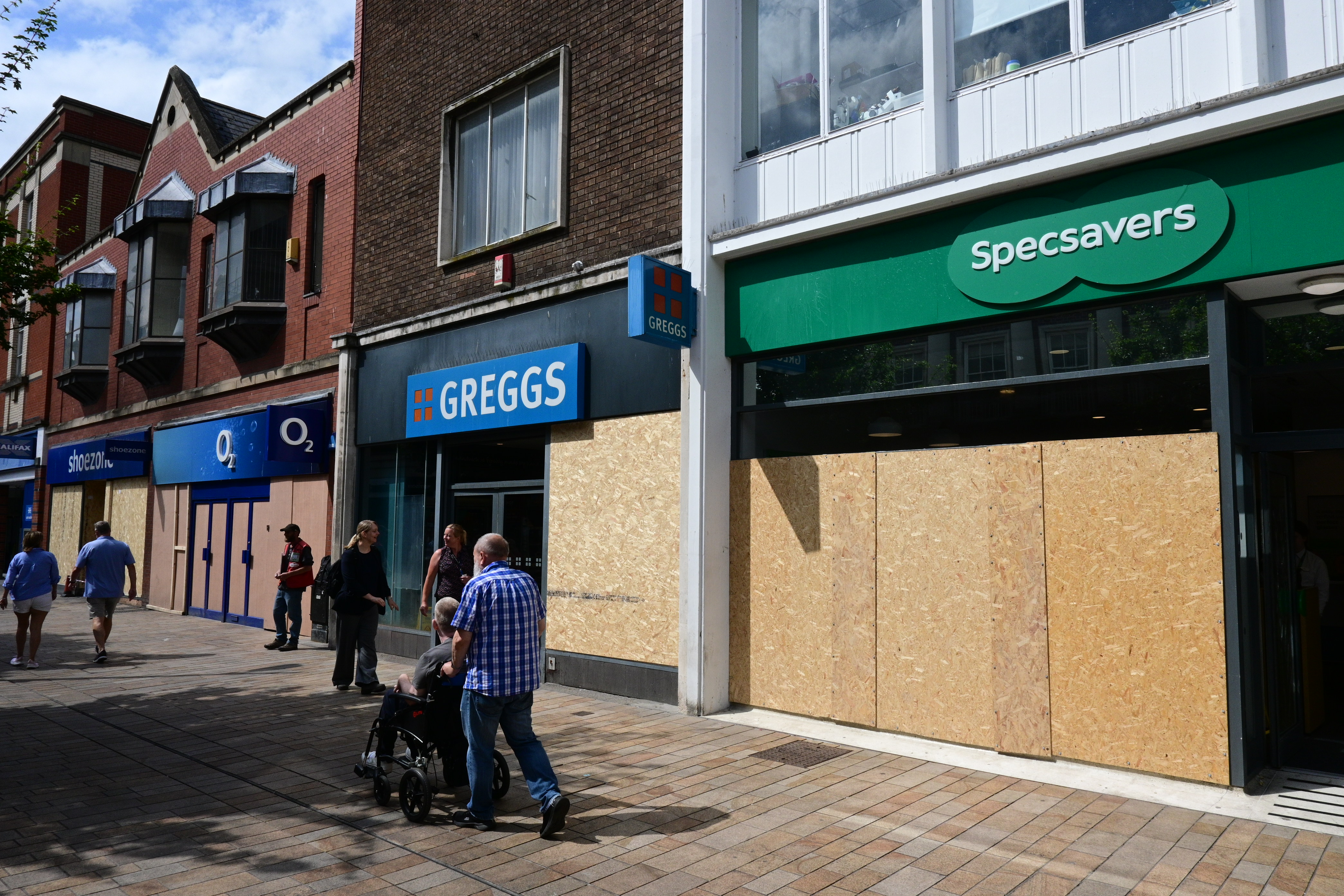
Jameson Street in Hull on 6 August

Twenty-five people were arrested in Hull, where rioters attacked police with bricks and fireworks, set vehicles alight and looted several shops, including a Shoe Zone which was set on fire, in unrest which left 11 police officers injured. A video circulated online of a mob of rioters surrounding and attacking an Asian man in his car saying the word "kill" while shouting racial slurs. A hotel housing asylum seekers was also attacked, with rioters throwing bricks and smashing windows.

Outside England, there were also protests and violence in Belfast, Northern Ireland. Anti-immigration and anti-racism demonstrators faced off outside Belfast City Hall and were kept apart by riot police. A firework was thrown toward the anti-racism demonstration. The anti-immigration protesters then attempted to march to the Belfast Islamic Centre, but were blocked by police. Instead, they attacked several immigrant-owned businesses on Botanic Avenue. Violence continued in the Sandy Row area that night, where a supermarket and a café owned by immigrants were burnt out. Cars were burned and missiles were thrown at police, injuring three officers. Four people were arrested for the violence. Elsewhere in Northern Ireland, the M5 motorway was closed due to protest activity in Newtownabbey, and there were protests in Bangor and Carrickfergus. In Cardiff, reports of a planned far-right protest, which never materialised, led to an anti-racism demonstration.

A woman was stabbed on King Street in Stirling and there was online speculation from anti-Islam campaigner Tommy Robinson that the attacker was Muslim. Police Scotland issued a public statement stating that the attacker was a white man and had been arrested.

In Doncaster, a planned far-right protest was cancelled after only one person showed up.

=== 4 August ===
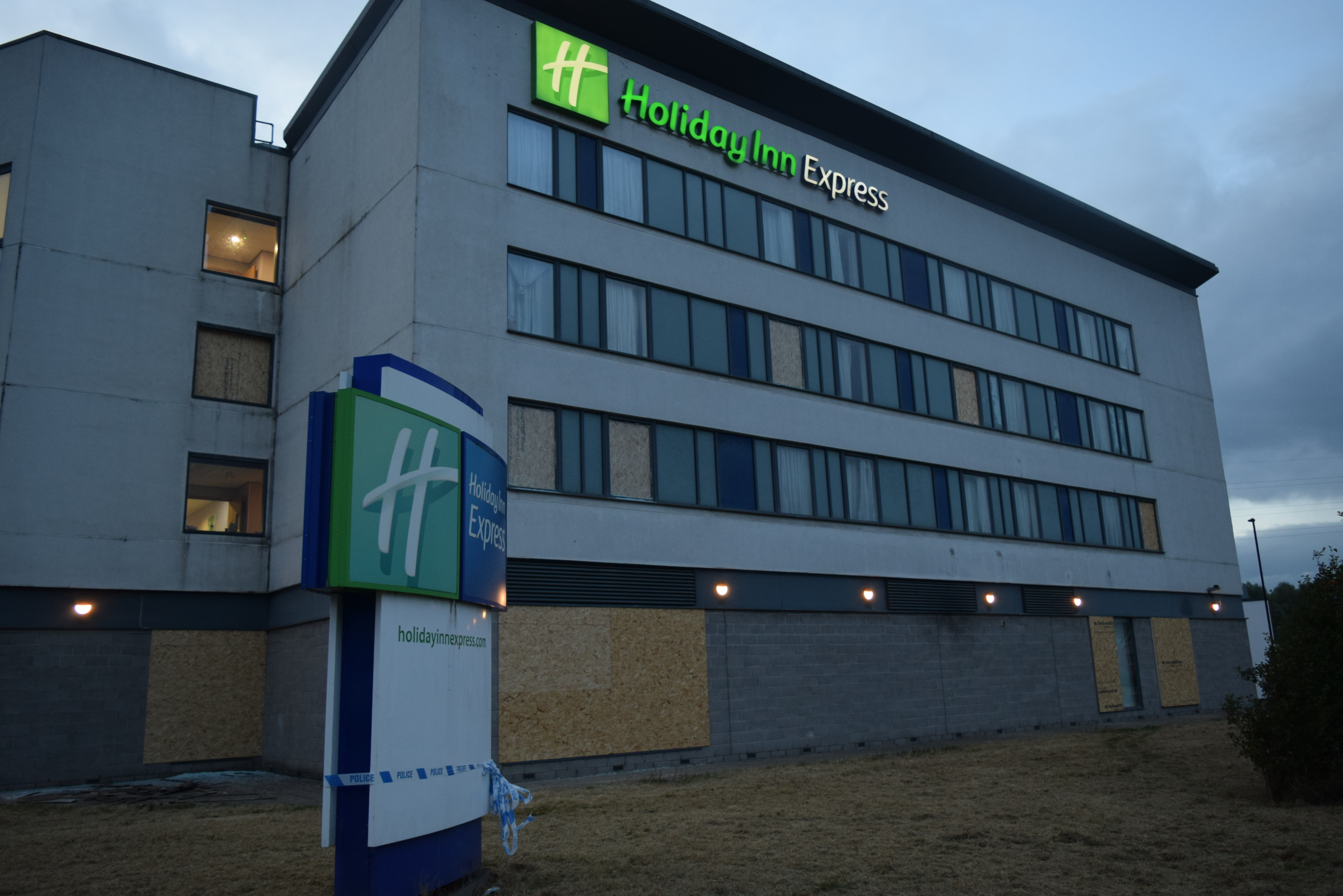
The Holiday Inn Express in Manvers, Wath upon Dearne, the day following the riot

In Wath upon Dearne in the Metropolitan Borough of Rotherham, there were demonstrations by anti-immigration and anti-racism protesters, with the former outnumbering the latter. There was then rioting outside a Holiday Inn Express hotel which had housed asylum seekers, where mask-wearing anti-immigration demonstrators threw objects at the building, smashing a number of windows and attempting to set the building on fire with a bin full of flammable material. They were also heard to chant "Get them out". South Yorkshire Police reported that 51 officers, as well as police dogs and horses, were injured during the violence in Rotherham, where concrete blocks, chairs, fire extinguishers and tree branches were thrown at them.

Greater Manchester Police issued a Section 34 dispersal notice covering Bolton. There were again demonstrations by far-right protesters and anti-racist counter-protesters, made up of primarily Asian men, who were kept separate by the police.

In Middlesbrough rioters targeted houses and cars in a residential area, smashing windows. Multiple cars were set alight and burning wheelie bins were pushed at a line of police officers, who were also targeted by missiles. Teesside University's Olympia Building had its windows broken, as did some houses and cars. Cleveland Police said that a number of properties on Parliament Road and the Crown Court building were significantly damaged, and a total of 43 people were arrested in connection to the disorder.

There was further rioting outside a second Holiday Inn Express hotel in Tamworth, which had been housing asylum seekers. Objects were thrown at the building and at the police, one of whom was injured, windows were smashed and part of the building was set on fire. Three police dogs were injured, one of whom was hit in the head by a brick.

In Solihull, there was a large anti-immigrant protest in the town centre, which forced the closure of the Touchwood shopping centre. Later, in the evening, West Midlands Police were called to Hermitage Road, where they dispersed two groups of people who were outside The Hub mosque. Police stated they were investigating whether one of these groups may have been connected to an anti-racism protest that was held in Birmingham city centre earlier that day.

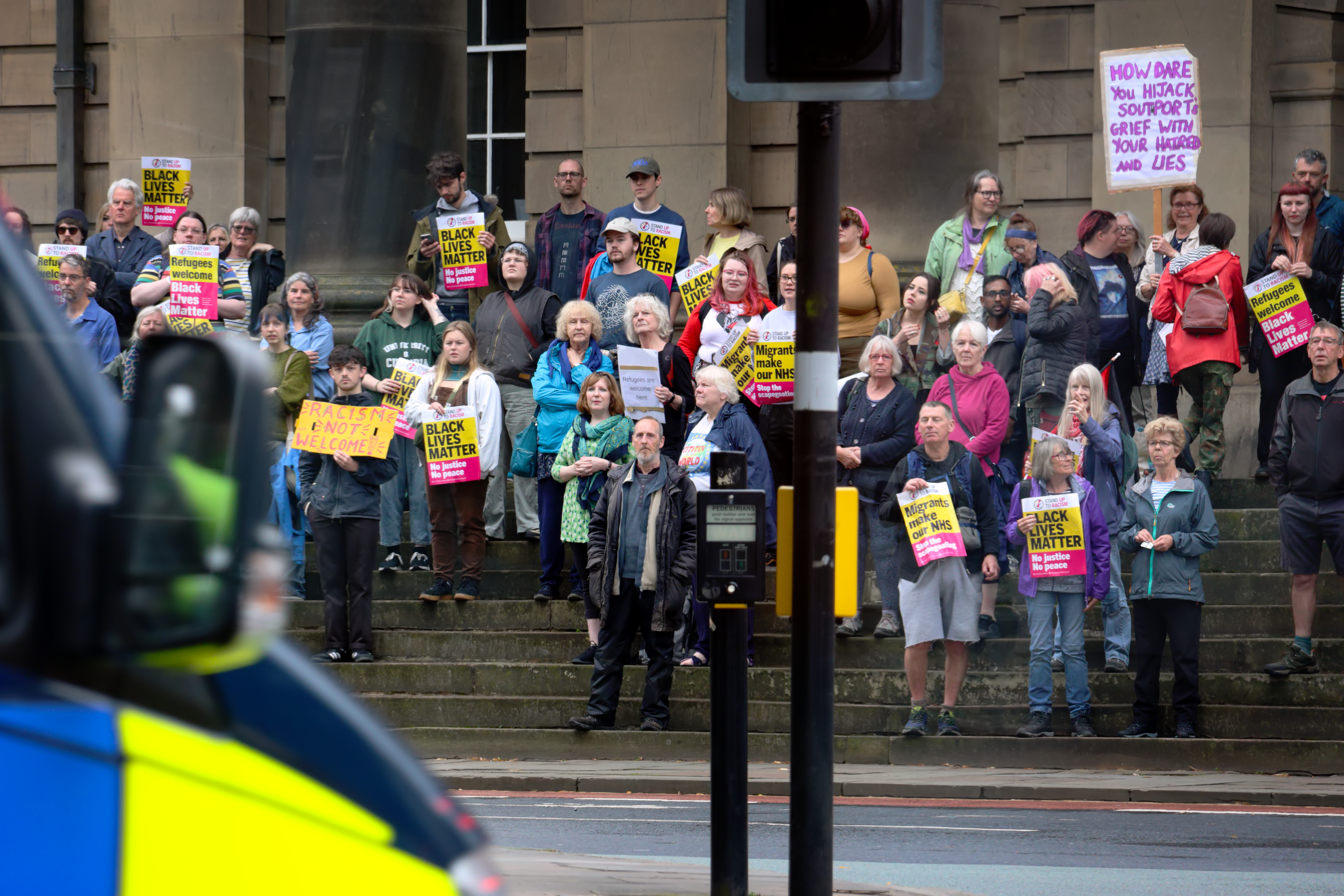
Anti-racism counter-protesters gather in Lancaster

Protests also occurred in Hull and Weymouth, with a counter-protest at the latter. In Lancaster, two businesses had their windows smashed during a face off between far-right and anti-fascist protesters. A protest in Sheffield led to one arrest for a public order offence, as well as a far-right protester being injured after he was attacked. Three people were arrested and two police officers injured during a protest in Weymouth. Anti-racism protesters gathered in Cardiff following a far-right protest which had been planned, where they encountered some far-right demonstrators outside the Senedd, though no conflict materialised.

=== 5 August ===
In Birmingham, a large group of Muslim locals gathered around a mosque in anticipation of a far-right protest which was rumoured to be scheduled in the area. Individuals were observed keeping watch around the Village Islamic Centre, while nearby shops closed, a hospital sent staff home, and several doctors' surgeries also closed early preparing for potential violence. Several vehicles close to Stechford police station were attacked amid the protest. A Sky News crew was followed by a man in a balaclava wielding a knife who slashed their van's tyre. Before this, the Sky News broadcast from the scene was interrupted by a small group of these protesters, with one shouting "free Palestine" and "fuck the EDL". A lone man outside at a pub in Yardley was also attacked by a group. The Birmingham Mail reported that video footage of the incident shows it starting with words being exchanged before one member of the group starts assaulting the man. Others then join in the beating while some try to break up the attack. Sky News' Midlands correspondent Becky Cotterill posted to X the next day that the manager of the pub had told her the man had goaded his attackers by using offensive language as they walked past. He was barred from the pub for "inciting violence."

In Plymouth, many businesses closed early, bus routes were diverted and a performance at the Theatre Royal was cancelled as two protests were planned to take place in the city. Plymouth City Council warned residents to stay away from the city centre as Devon and Cornwall Police said they would be increasing their presence there. Police lined Royal Parade as the two groups of protesters – one anti-fascist and the other far-right – faced off, throwing items including glass and stones at each other as one woman on the anti-fascist side was injured by a flying item. As the protests continued into the night, bottles, bricks and fireworks were thrown and arrests were made. Three police officers were carried away from the scene after being injured, with a police van being damaged. Shortly before 10 p.m., Devon and Cornwall Police reported that 150 officers were deployed in the city centre. A TK Maxx's shopfront was smashed and brick paving was torn up in the city centre. In a statement the police revealed that six arrests had been made relating to the disorder and 'several' officers were injured, as well as some members of the public, two of whom were hospitalised.

Outside England, there was further violence in the Sandy Row area of Belfast, Northern Ireland. A business was targeted for a second time, and armoured police Land Rovers were attacked with petrol bombs and bricks. Police fired two plastic bullets at rioters in response. A man in his 50s was taken to hospital following a serious assault in which his attackers "stamped on his head" as other members of the public tried to shield him. Police were treating the attack as a racially motivated hate crime. Assistant Chief Constable Melanie Jones of the PSNI said there was loyalist paramilitary involvement in the violence.

Bricks were thrown at police officers in Darlington after "two large groups of mostly males" gathered in the North Lodge Park area, which is near a mosque. There was one arrest. A unity rally took place in Oxford at Carfax Tower.

Multiple Muslim graves in the Burnley Cemetery were vandalized, which Lancashire Police investigated as a hate crime.

On 5 August, a list of at least 39 immigration law specialists, asylum support organisations and immigration services across England, originally published on the Telegram messaging app along with the phrase "no more immigration" and other anti-migration sentiment and widely circulated on social media, identified their addresses as targets for far-right demonstrations over the coming week.

== Aftermath ==
=== 6 August ===
In the Shankill area of Belfast, masked men rammed a hijacked car into an estate agents, amid false claims that the agency was renting homes to asylum seekers. Nearby, masked men attacked immigrants' homes and cars. In west Belfast, youths racially abused staff at a Middle Eastern shop. Altogether, six people (three men, three teenagers) were arrested over the disorder.

One person was arrested and 37 dispersal orders issued in Durham over fears of potential unrest as reports of planned disorder circulated online. However, despite these reports, there were no reported incidents of criminal damage or disorder in the city.

=== 7 August ===
On 7 August, over 100 far-right and 30 counter protests were reportedly planned across the country in 41 of 43 police force areas in England and Wales, with their main focus being immigration centres and lawyers' offices. However, very few far-right protesters turned out. Instead, anti-racist rallies were held across the country with counter protests dominating the evening, involving approximately 25,000 counter-protesters.

Parts of London, including Brentford, Harrow, North Finchley, and Walthamstow, saw large counter-protests at sites mentioned on the list of targets where far-right protesters were supposedly going to gather, with the latter attracting an estimated 10,000 demonstrators. In Lewisham a rally was held, organised by Stand Up To Racism and other local anti-racist groups, to "show solidarity" with communities targeted by the far right, though there was no direct threat to the area. Some local businesses closed early, and market traders were told by the council to close "earlier than usual" ahead of potential protests. This led to some confusion about whether the far-right were also planning to gather in the area, but Mayor of Lewisham Brenda Dacres confirmed on the day to News Shopper that there was no intelligence of any planned far-right activity in Lewisham that night. A similar situation happened in Stoke Newington in Hackney, where SUTR also organised a solidarity rally, although reporting by Hackney Gazette suggests it was because of rumours circulated online that a far-right demonstration had been planned for outside The Old Fire Station on Leswin Road. The Metropolitan Police declined to comment on whether it was aware of any far-right action planned in the area.

The Washington Post reported that patients in multiple areas including Walthamstow received text messages explaining that their doctor's offices would close early on Wednesday to avoid "threatened disruption" due to the riots.

In Liverpool, a human shield was formed outside a former church, now used by a charity for asylum seekers, by hundreds of protesters. Brighton saw a group of eight anti-immigration protesters surrounded by police to protect them from around 2,000 counter-protesters on Queen's Road; another protest in Hastings also saw a crowd of hundreds of anti-racism protesters. Over 2,000 people attended a counter-protest in Old Market, Bristol, where scenes were mostly peaceful despite one arrest after a bottle and a brick were thrown at a police vehicle. Around 500 anti-racist counter-protesters gathered in Westcliff-on-Sea, Southend, to oppose an expected far-right protest that did not materialise. One individual in the area was arrested by police on suspicion of possessing an offensive weapon. Hundreds of anti-racism protesters gathered in Birmingham's Jewellery Quarter following reports a refugee and migrant centre would be the target of a far-right protest. Around 600 people gathered at Magdalen Road in Oxford over fears that a mosque would be targeted. Counter-protests occurred elsewhere in the country, including Normanton, Derby, Newcastle, Sheffield and Swindon. Smaller gatherings were also present in Accrington and Tamworth, the latter being only a few miles from a hotel which was attacked on 4 August.

Some protests were not as peaceful as others seen across the country, however scenes were still calm compared to the riots seen a few days prior. Chatham saw around 150 anti-immigration protesters outnumbering around 50 counter-protesters; in Aldershot, dozens of police had to separate two groups of protesters. Three people were arrested at a counter-protest in Northampton, and one person was arrested in Bournemouth, Blackpool, Middlesbrough and Portsmouth. The latter was the site of the largest anti-immigration protest of the day, with 200 people gathering and blocking Mile End Road. Two people were arrested in nearby Southampton, where up to 400 counter-protesters outnumbered around 50 far-right protesters.

Belfast saw its third consecutive night of disorder, with objects thrown at police and bins set alight. Five men were arrested on suspicion of riotous behaviour. As well as east and north Belfast, police were present in the village of Mallusk near Newtownabbey amid reports of a planned protest. An anti-racism rally was attended by hundreds of people in Derry's Guildhall Square.

Ricky Jones, a Dartford Labour councillor, was filmed addressing a crowd at a counter-protest in Walthamstow, East London, stating: "They are disgusting fascists and we need to cut all their throats and get rid of them all." in reference to the right-wing protests across the country. On 8 August, Jones was suspended by Labour and arrested following the release of the footage. On 9 August, he was charged with encouraging violent disorder. He pleaded not guilty on 6 September. In August 2025 he was tried for encouraging violent disorder and found not guilty.

=== 8 August ===
Two people were arrested in Barnsley after two groups of demonstrators clashed in the town centre.

An anti-racism rally took place at Stormont outside Northern Ireland's Parliament Buildings, where the Northern Ireland Assembly was recalled from its summer recess to discuss the recent disorder in Belfast.

=== 9 August ===
Hundreds of anti-racists turned up to counter a planned protest outside a Holiday Inn rumoured to be housing asylum seekers in Crawley, West Sussex. BBC News reported there were four anti-immigration protesters, with one arrest made.

In Paisley, Renfrewshire, 300 anti-racists, including representatives of trade unions and human rights organisations, protested against a planned far-right demonstration outside a hotel housing asylum seekers, but no anti-immigration protestors appeared. A similar demonstration took place at the Cairn Hotel, which was also housing asylum seekers, in Bathgate, where around 150 people gathered in response to an organised far-right protest.

=== 10 August ===
There was unrest in Northern Ireland during the early hours, with a petrol bomb thrown at a mosque in Newtownards around 1am, and cars set alight in Belfast. A man was arrested in connection with the Newtownards attack. Later that day, approximately 15,000 marched against racism in Belfast, organised by the United Against Racism group.

Anti-racist demonstrations took place across Scotland in Dumfries, Dundee, Edinburgh and Glasgow. In Edinburgh, hundreds of protesters peacefully gathered outside the Scottish Parliament Building, with similar scenes taking place at Glasgow's George Square, Dumfries' Planestanes and Dundee's City Square, outside Caird Hall. Despite the demonstrations being organised in response to rumoured anti-immigration protests in Scotland, there was no sign of far-right protests.

In England, anti-racist protesters outnumbered far-right protesters, with 5,000 assembling outside the Reform UK headquarters in London, and 1,000 people protesting in Liverpool and Newcastle.

A recurring protest against the Gaza war in Cardiff was joined by many protesters opposing the far-right riots. In Tenby, around 100 people gathered in Tudor Square after a far-right demonstration due to take place on the Esplanade was flagged on social media, however no such gathering took place.

Stand Up to Racism organised 22 protests titled "Stop the Far Right" in cities across the United Kingdom including London, Manchester and Birmingham.

== Responses ==
=== Domestic ===
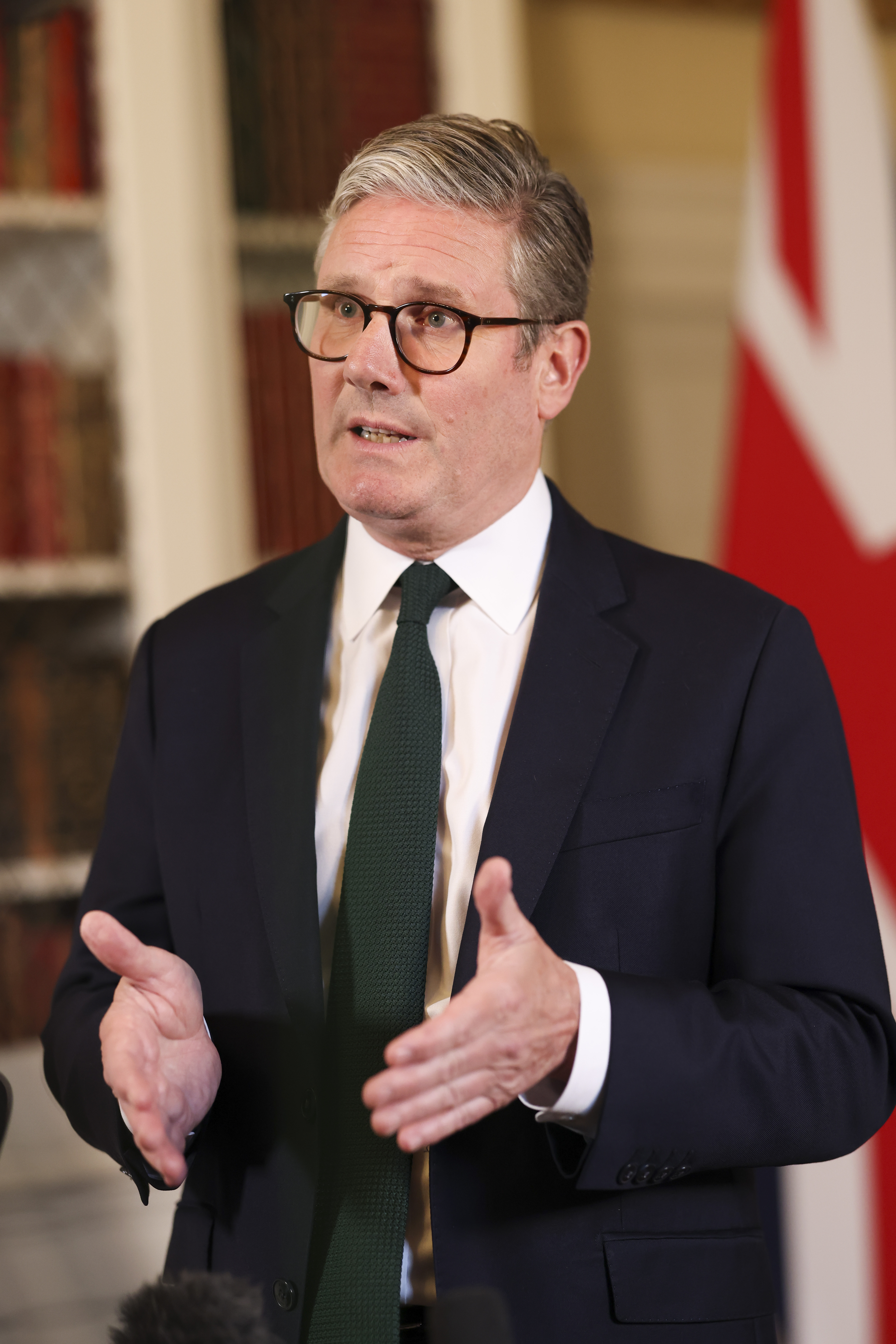
Starmer speaks to the media following an earlier COBRA meeting to discuss the violent disorder across the country on 6 August 2024

After the Southport riot, Prime Minister Keir Starmer wrote that those who had "hijacked the vigil for the victims" had "insulted the community as it grieves" and that rioters would "feel the full force of the law." On 1 August, and following a meeting with senior police officers, Starmer announced the establishment of a national violent disorder programme to facilitate greater cooperation between police forces when dealing with violent disorder.

On 4 August, Starmer said that rioters "will feel the full force of the law" and told them "You will regret taking part in this, whether directly or those whipping up this action online and then running away themselves". He added "I won't shy away from calling it what it is – far-right thuggery". Starmer later called an emergency response meeting of COBRA. After the COBRA meeting he announced the establishment of a "standing army" of specialist police officers to address the violence, and help bring it to an end. On 12 August, Downing Street confirmed that Starmer had cancelled his planned summer holiday in order to continue to address the violence.

Home Secretary Yvette Cooper condemned the Southport riot as appalling and requested a criminal investigation. According to The Independent, Cooper was also "reviewing whether the far-right English Defence League [...] should be made a proscribed terrorist organisation", after its connection to the Southport riot, a suggestion echoed by Deputy Prime Minister Angela Rayner, although the EDL has ceased to exist in a formal sense.

Home Office minister David Hanson said that police were monitoring organisations, and would use face recognition technology to identify anyone involved in violence.

When asked by a Sky News journalist about claims of two-tier policing, Mark Rowley, the Metropolitan Police Commissioner, grabbed the reporter's microphone and threw it on the ground, for which he later apologised. Responding two days later, he said those asking the question were imperilling his officers.

The Northern Ireland Assembly was recalled, and was scheduled to meet on 8 August, while Starmer rejected calls from some politicians, including Nigel Farage and Priti Patel, to recall the Westminster parliament.

Following the emergence on 5 August of a list of immigration law specialists, asylum support organisations and immigration services to be targeted by far-right groups, the president of The Law Society wrote to the Prime Minister, Lord Chancellor and Home Secretary to express concerns.

On 7 August, UK police announced their largest mobilisation since the 2011 England riots, due to the threat of further violence targeting asylum seekers and immigrants, with 6,000 riot police on duty throughout the country and 2,000 in reserve as reinforcements. Two days later, Police Scotland announced the deployment of 120 of its officers to Belfast in order to help deal with violence in the city. On 12 August, the UK government announced that despite a de-escalation in the riots over the weekend, government officials remained on "high alert".

On 19 August, the UK government activated Operation Early Dawn, its measures to ease prison overcrowding, as more people were given custodial sentences over their roles in the riots. The measures, in place in the north of England and the Midlands, would see defendants waiting to appear in court held at police stations until a prison space became available for them. Jo Stevens, the Secretary of State for Wales, said that the measures would be in force for "a very short period", typically "a matter of days, or at the most months".

=== International ===
Australia, Hong Kong, India, Indonesia, Malaysia, Nigeria, the Philippines, Singapore, Tanzania, the United Arab Emirates and the United States issued travel advisories and safety warnings to the United Kingdom advising their citizens to exercise caution and avoid areas where protests are taking place.

Russia called on the British government to "refrain from any unjustified or unproportionate [sic] use of violence against protesters and ensure their right to freedom of assembly".

The visiting Sri Lanka national cricket team raised concerns about England Tests due to the riots. The England and Wales Cricket Board responded by reassuring Sri Lanka Cricket and the team about the security arrangements in place.

In Pakistan, officials charged a man with cyberterrorism after he was linked with the Channel3Now website, which spread false claims about the Southport attacker. He was later acquitted as local police did not find evidence identifying him as the originator of the false claims.

== Investigations, arrests and prosecutions ==
On 3 August, the Ministry of Justice began discussions about magistrates' courts in England and Wales remaining open overnight to preliminary rule on suspects arrested, due to the anticipated increase in people held in custody for riot related offences. This also occurred during the 2011 England riots. This proposal was criticised by Nazir Afzal, a former Chief Crown Prosecutor, saying such a measure would worsen the backlog in British courts.

By 5 August, police had arrested 378 people, and the first court hearings were held on a range of charges including violent disorder, assault on an emergency worker, and burglary, with some defendants pleading guilty.

=== Charges and prosecutions ===
On 6 August 2024, a man was convicted of inciting violence, following Facebook posts advocating attacking a hotel in Leeds housing over 200 migrants, and was sentenced to 20 months in prison, of which at least half must be served in custody. A day later, the first sentences for crimes committed during the riots were handed out to three men who took part in unrest in Southport and Liverpool. The three were sentenced to periods of between 20 months and three years in prison.

On 8 August, a further 21 people received prison sentences for their roles in the riots.

On 9 August, two men were sentenced to 20 months and 18 months in prison respectively for affray after a counter-protest in Leeds city centre on 3 August. A 34-year-old woman was also sent to prison for 20 months after pushing a burning wheelie bin towards a line of police officers during a demonstration in Middlesbrough.

Also on 9 August, a 55-year-old woman was arrested for circulating a fake name for the Southport attacker on her X account before his real identity was disclosed.

On 12 August, two 12-year-old boys were among those convicted. They became the youngest people to be convicted following their involvement in disorder in Southport and Manchester. On 13 August, the National Police Chiefs' Council said 1,024 had been arrested and 575 had been charged in relation to the riots. On the same day, the case of a 13-year-old girl involved in rioting in Aldershot was among those to be heard. She pleaded guilty to violent disorder after being captured on film kicking and punching the entrance of Potters International Hotel, which was being used to house asylum seekers. On 14 August, a 53-year-old woman from Cheshire was sentenced to 15 months in prison after pleading guilty to sending a communication threatening death or serious harm over a Facebook post in which she suggested a mosque should "be blown up with the adults inside".

On 15 August, a 30-year-old man who kicked and punched a black man in the face during a riot in Manchester was sentenced to a prison term of three years. The prosecutor said the attack was "motivated by racial hatred". Also on 15 August, a 15-year-old boy from Sunderland was the first person to be charged with the offence of rioting following the unrest.

On 16 August, two men who were part of a mob that attacked a car containing three Romanian men in Hull on 3 August were sentenced to prison terms of six years and four years eight months respectively. Also on 16 August, a 35-year-old man was sentenced to three years for posting false information about the identity of the Southport attacker and praising rioters on his X account which had over 90,000 followers at the time of his arrest.

On 19 August, two men who took part in violence outside a hotel housing asylum seekers in Rotherham were each sentenced to two years and eight months in prison. Those sentenced on 20 August included a man who threw bottles, bricks and three concrete blocks at police officers in Bristol, and who received two and a half years in prison.

On 21 August, a man from Hull was sentenced to three years in prison for trying to smash the window of a police van with a concrete block.

On 28 August, it was reported that an 11-year-old child was among people arrested in a series of dawn raids conducted by police.

On 18 September, Ehsan Hussain, a 25-year-old man from Birmingham, was sentenced to two years and four months in prison, having pleaded guilty to distributing threatening and abusive material intended to stir up racial hatred. The man, who is Asian, posed as "Chris Nolan" an invented white far-right extremist and used a Telegram chat with 12,500 members to call for violence in mainly Muslim areas of the city.

On 23 December, it was reported that a 40-year-old from Southport, who had been identified as a man seen in a viral video of the 30 July rioting, had been sentenced to two years and six months in jail after pleading guilty to violent disorder at Liverpool Crown Court, which involved throwing bins at officers and punching a police vehicle. In the viral video he can be seen walking up to a line of riot police, putting his hands on his hips, and gyrating in front of them. He is then struck in the chest and head by hurled bricks before turning around and walking back towards the crowd. As he holds his head, another brick hits him in the groin. Later that evening, officers were called to a separate incident at which he was present. They took him to Southport hospital to be treated for the head injury, where the police say he racially abused another patient. The officers recognised him from the already widely shared footage and he was arrested.

==== Lucy Connolly ====
On 29 July 2024, Lucy Connolly, then 41, a childminder, and the wife of a Conservative West Northamptonshire Councillor, posted a tweet calling for "[m]ass deportation now" and for hotels housing asylum seekers to be set on fire, adding: "If that makes me racist, so be it". X subsequently said the post had not violated their rules. Connolly was arrested on 6 August; she was charged with "publishing written material which was threatening, abusive or insulting intending thereby to stir up racial hatred or having regard to all the circumstances, whereby racial hatred was likely to be stirred up", she was granted bail, and appeared at Nottingham Magistrates Court on 10 August. She appeared by video and did not enter a plea, she was remanded in custody. Connolly was remanded in custody to appear at Northampton Crown Court on 12 August.

On 22 August 2024, Connolly's lawyer requested bail at the Crown Court, and was refused. On 2 September 2024, Connolly pled guilty to distributing material with the intention of stirring up racial hatred, contrary to the Public Order Act 1986. At a hearing held at Birmingham Crown Court on 17 October 2024, Judge Melbourne Inman KC sentenced Connolly to 31 months in prison, with 40% to be served. On 20 May 2025, Connolly was denied leave to appeal against her sentence. On 21 August 2025, Connolly was released from HM Prison Peterborough.

==== Tyler James Kay ====
On 9 August 2024, a 26-year old man, Tyler James Kay, was sentenced to 38 months (to serve up to half) for copying Connolly's posts.

==== Telegram groups ====
In October 2024, the BBC confronted a 20-year-old man, who was an administrator in the "Southport Wake Up" Telegram messaging group, known as "Mr AG", and revealed him to be Charles-Emmanuel Mikko Rasanen, a neo-Nazi from Helsinki, Finland who shared online instructions on how to commit arson with the UK rioters. The channel had been set up within hours of the stabbing and soon amassed a huge following. It shared details about local protests but quickly descended into making violent threats against named individuals and locations. On 5 August Telegram appeared to remove the channel, which at that time had almost 15,000 members. It was unclear if Telegram made this decision itself or if it was at the direction of the authorities in the UK. Andrew McIntyre, a 39-year-old taxi driver, who started the group was jailed for seven and a half years in January 2025 for his role in instigating violence.

==== Peter Lynch ====
Lynch was at the riot outside a Holiday Inn Express hotel housing asylum seekers in Manvers, Rotherham on 4 August 2024. He was recorded yelling "scum", "child killers", "protect my children", "we are on the streets now to protect our kids" and "you are protecting people who are killing our kids and raping them" at police during the riot. He was pictured holding a placard asserting the corruption of MPs, police chiefs, TV media, and judges and the judiciary.

He was arrested and charged with violent disorder for which he pleaded guilty and was jailed for 2 years and 8 months. In sentencing Lynch on 22 August, Judge Jeremy Richardson KC said that Lynch's sign and protest were not unlawful, but his verbal abuse towards police officers during the "racist incident" crossed the line.

Lynch hanged himself at HMP Moorland two months into his sentence on 19 October 2024, aged 61. Respects were paid to Lynch at the 'Unite the Kingdom' march in London a week later.

== Reactions ==
The Labour MP for Southport, Patrick Hurley, said on BBC Radio 4's Today on 31 July, that the rioters were not local residents, but were "thugs who'd got the train in" and were "utterly disrespecting the families of the dead and injured children, and [...] the town". The rioters had broken windows of Southport Mosque; Hurley told Today that people "were using the horrific incident on Monday, the deaths of three little kiddies, for their own political purposes". The Liverpool Region Mosque Network and the Muslim Association of Britain released statements condemning the riot.

The Reform UK leader, Nigel Farage, condemned the violence, stating: "The levels of intimidation and threat to life have no place in a functioning democracy". He called for Parliament to be recalled over the riots and suggested there was a widespread impression of "two-tier policing" as a result of "soft policing" during Black Lives Matter protests, which he said contributed to a "sense of injustice".

Conservative former Home Secretary Priti Patel called Farage's comments deeply misleading and "simply not relevant right now". She told Times Radio: "There's a clear difference between effectively blocking streets or roads being closed to burning down libraries, hotels, food banks and attacking places of worship. What we have seen is thuggery, violence, racism." Patel also wrote to the Prime Minister and Home Secretary, asking them to recall parliament.

Farage was criticised by the former head of UK counter-terrorism, Neil Basu, for questioning whether the truth was being withheld from the public, with Basu accusing Farage of inciting violence and creating conspiracy theories. Farage was also accused of giving legitimacy to acts of violence by Steve Rotheram, the Mayor of Liverpool City Region, after releasing a video in which he said he did not support violence, but the protests were "nothing to what could happen over the course of the next few weeks".

On 2 August, ahead of anticipated protests the following weekend, the Muslim Council of Britain recommended that mosques "review and strengthen their security protocols", and counter-protests by anti-racists were organised under the banner of "Stop the far right: Don't let the racists divide us", predominantly by Stand Up to Racism. Church leaders in Northern Ireland condemned calls for anti-Islamic protests in the province at the weekend. Leaders from Jewish, Sikh, and Hindu religious communities also released statements condemning the anti-Islamic rioting.

Hampshire's police and crime commissioner and Conservative politician Donna Jones released a controversial statement that was widely criticised, in which she said that arresting people was "treating the symptom and not the cause" and otherwise appeared to agree with the protesters. The media release was later removed from the Police and Crime Commission's website. Susan Scott, a Conservative Party councillor on Stockton-on-Tees council, resigned after making anti-Muslim remarks.

Elon Musk attracted criticism for his comments about the 2024 riots, including a 4 August prediction that "Civil war is inevitable", which was condemned by the then-Prime Minister's official spokesman. Musk subsequently criticised the government's response to the disorder and shared an image, that was later deleted, promoting an unsubstantiated conspiracy theory that "Detention camps for rioters were being constructed in the Falkland Islands." His statements were not supported by substantive evidence. The image he shared was confirmed to be a fabricated screenshot made to resemble a genuine Telegraph article; the newspaper confirmed that it had never published the article.

On 5 August, Neil Basu said that the worst of the far-right violence should be treated as terrorism; "Not only does it fit the definition of terrorism, it is terrorism", in reference to attempting to burn down buildings occupied by Muslims or asylum seekers. He further described actions as a "racial cause designed to intimidate a section of the public".

A YouGov poll of 2,114 people on 5–6 August found that 7% supported the riots, while 34% supported the broader peaceful protests; 21% of Reform UK voters supported the riots, 9% of Conservative voters, 3% of Labour voters, and 1% of Liberal Democrat voters. Another YouGov poll of 2,163 British adults in the same period saw immigration identified as the number one issue facing the country (51%), above the economy (44%), and crime (39%). In July, the figures were immigration 41%, the economy 53%, and crime 20%. This represented a 10-point rise in importance for immigration, and a 19-point rise for crime. According to YouGov, "It is impossible to unpick how much of the recent shift is because of the stabbings, and how much are as a result of the week-long rioting since then." The concern about crime figure is the highest value in polls since 2011, when there were also major national riots.

On 7 August, Wired magazine reported that Telegram had removed a group set up in the wake of the Southport stabbing.

On 9 August, King Charles III spoke by telephone with the Prime Minister and senior police officers. A statement was subsequently released by Buckingham Palace describing how "The King shared how he had been greatly encouraged by the many examples of community spirit that had countered the aggression and criminality from a few with the compassion and resilience of the many". Later, on 20 August, the King visited Southport, where he met those affected by the riots and members of the community who had participated in reconciliation efforts. The following day, he hosted the victims' families at Clarence House in London.

== Analysis ==
For the Southport riot, far-right activists had been promoting the demonstration that started in Southport, prior to involvement in the riot. HuffPost described far-right activists as having "hijacked" the vigil for the victims, and the Manchester Evening News reported "far right thugs, fuelled by lies, sought to exploit the tragedy". Merseyside Police said on the night of the riot that they believed supporters of the EDL were involved in and organised the disturbances. Hope Not Hate described them as supporters of Tommy Robinson. Robinson denied the EDL were involved, while arguing that the anger in Southport was justified. A prominent member of the neo-Nazi group Patriotic Alternative took part in the riot and another member helped to promote the event.

The protests and riots were fuelled by wider Islamophobia, concerns over crime, anti-migration sentiment, xenophobia, nationalism and against perceived biases by the police and media. The Independent described the riots as being "sparked by Islamophobic and racist sentiments", with examples of mosques being targeted and several violent racist attacks on ethnic minorities by the far-right in Liverpool, Hull and Bristol. Politico described the cause of the violence as "Islamophobic resentment that had long brewed across the United Kingdom" as having surfaced, citing hate crimes associated with British Muslims as being the highest among any religious group in the country, according to government data. According to Hope not Hate, although the stabbing in Southport was the catalyst, "most of these protests and riots are more broadly focused, expressive of a wider hostility to multiculturalism, anti-Muslim and anti-migrant prejudice, as well as a visceral streak of populist anti-Government sentiment".

During the protests, widespread disinformation blaming immigrants and Muslims for crime were shared online. Andrew Chadwick, a professor of political communication at Loughborough University, described a viral tweet as being "deliberately fabricated to generate hostility toward ethnic minorities and immigrants, and it's a potentially Islamophobic piece of propaganda". Matthew Feldman, an expert on right-wing extremism, commented "It is difficult to think of a much better example of online harms breaching the real world than a fake story demonising Muslims and people of colour and leading to riots on the streets". Former security minister Stephen McPartland accused Russia and Vladimir Putin's regime of involvement in the campaign of misinformation, describing it as "part of the Russian playbook". Days later, The Independent reported that misinformation and conspiracy regarding the suspect remained and appeared to be the motivating force behind the protests.

Extremism experts attributed the large far-right rally in London, led by Robinson a week prior to the protests as having boosted supporters, with Robinson playing a significant role in inciting outrage. The Financial Times described the evolution of the movement from "more formally organised white-supremacist groups into personality-driven splinter groups", while capitalising on social media for outreach and organising. Police officials have described organisers as being in distinct far-right groups, organising online under banners such as "enough is enough", "save our kids", and "stop the boats" (the latter in reference to migrant crossings of the English Channel), with Robinson being a central figure in calls to hold riots. Writing for The Observer, Shabana Mahmood, the Secretary of State for Justice, suggested the impact of the disorder would be "felt for months and years to come" as the volume of cases linked to the riots going through the courts would affect government plans to address a backlog of cases. Data recorded by ACLED shows the riots significantly increased the number of violent demonstrations across the United Kingdom in 2024, exceeding the totals of 2020 and 2021 which were affected by the COVID-19 pandemic.

In May 2026, The Guardian reported that 21% of those arrested over participation in the riots had since been reported to the police for domestic abuse. This figure was 54% for those arrested by Cumbria Police.

In November 2026, academics Marc Owen Jones and Sohan Dsouza wrote an article on The Nerve, found that a major anti-Muslim campaign in the UK can be traced back to Israel during the riots and the 2024 United Kingdom general election. An investigation found that large numbers of advertisements about an "Islamic takeover" by Qatar, with more than 154 million exposures were recorded between 2024 and 2026. The investigation also found that the campaign can be traced back to a "fixed-line internet address in Israel", where 78 video files that were recovered from Telegram channels revealed "Hebrew names, nicknames and words in folders, drive labels and editing projects, alongside usernames and Mac model identifiers".

=== Police inspectorate review ===
The second part of a review by the police inspectorate was published on 7 May 2025. It found that the participants in the riots were mostly locals and that the violence "was mainly unrelated to their ideology or political views". The inspectors did not find any conclusive evidence that any of the activities were co-ordinated by extremist groups, but that they were mostly incited online by "disaffected individuals, influencers or groups" and that "Some of the main reasons for the widespread disorder were social deprivation, austerity and the economic downturn, political policies and decisions on migration and asylum, and decreasing trust and confidence in policing". The chief inspector of constabulary said that misinformation and disinformation that had been posted online had been left up for too long and that helped fuel the disorder. The chief inspector also said that the police needed more powers to be available to make it easier for misinformation and disinformation published on social media to be taken down, and that the police should counter such information by putting the known facts into the public domain sooner.

The National Police Chiefs' Council (NPCC) responded to the review saying that it did not accurately assess the police role in countering such online content and that a fully coordinated and cross government approach was required. The NPCC chair said, "While there are lessons to learn, it is crucial to acknowledge that law enforcement does not - and should not - regulate online content.", adding, "Responsibility for ensuring information is accurate and does not fuel harm lies with those posting it, platform providers and regulatory bodies" and that the report did not "fully recognise the successes" of the police media strategy, and how "strengthening intelligence alone is not enough to mitigate the risks posed by misinformation".
