= Suicide of Peter Lynch =

2024 suicide

Peter Lynch (25 February 1963 – 19 October 2024) was a 61 year old prisoner who hanged himself at HMP Moorland on 19 October 2024. He was serving his 2 year and 8 month sentence for violent disorder in Manvers, Rotherham during the 2024 United Kingdom riots.

== Background ==
Prior to his arrest, he worked in the packing industry and had been made unemployed. Lynch had been married for 36 years at the time of his death and had four children and three grandchildren. He was diagnosed with diabetes, thyroid issues, angina and had recently suffered a heart attack prior to his death. Lynch believed in conspiracy theories about the "deep state" and NASA.

== Arrest and sentencing ==
Lynch took part in the 2024 United Kingdom riots outside a Holiday Inn Express hotel housing asylum seekers in Manvers, Rotherham on 4 August 2024. He was recorded yelling "scum", "child killers", "protect my children", "we are on the streets now to protect our kids" and "you are protecting people who are killing our kids and raping them" at police during the riot. He was pictured holding a placard asserting the corruption of MPs, police chiefs, TV media, and judges and the judiciary.

He was arrested and charged with violent disorder on 22 August for which he pleaded guilty and was jailed for 2 years and 8 months. In sentencing Lynch on 22 August, Judge Jeremy Richardson KC said that Lynch's sign and protest were not unlawful, but his verbal abuse towards police officers during the "racist incident" crossed the line.

On 17 October 2024, Lynch expressed his views on immigration during a random drugs test. He told the officers "they're all rapists and paedophiles and should not be allowed in the country." He was asked to stop because the officers found the comments "disrespectful, abusive and racist" but Lynch persisted. Lynch denied that his comments were racist.

He was initially sent to HMP Doncaster before being transferred to HMP Moorland. According to his cellmate at HMP Doncaster, Leonard Tyler, Lynch had attempted suicide by hanging in his cell. On another occasion, Lynch appeared to take a number of prescribed tablets causing him to vomit. Tyler did not report Lynch's suicide attempts.

== Suicide ==
On 18 October 2024, Peter Lynch was last seen alive during a roll-call at 19:00 GMT. Officers found him in his cell, unresponsive and not breathing and performed CPR until paramedics arrived. Lynch was pronounced dead at 06:42 GMT.

== Aftermath ==
After Lynch's death, right-wing political figures portrayed him as a victim of "two tier" justice and blamed Prime Minister Keir Starmer for his death. Richard Tice, the deputy leader of Reform UK, wrote on X that Lynch had said some "very unwise, daft, bad things." But did not "deserve to die for it" and claimed that "Two-tier justice by Sir Keir Starmer killed this man." Tommy Robinson wrote on X: "Peter Lynch was one of us. A concerned British grandfather. Imprisoned by a corrupt judiciary under orders of Keir Starmer."

Respects were paid to Lynch at the Unite the Kingdom march in London on 26 October 2024, a few days after his death. Tommy Robinson asked his supporters on X to remember "we're here not only for him, but most importantly to pay respects to Peter Lynch, and support the families of the politicial prisoners".

== Investigation ==
An inquest was held following his death. Peter's son, Casey, expressed concerns about the investigation including why two previous suicide attempts were not "taken seriously". An inquest was held from 20 July to 4 August to investigate his death and his mental health during the time of his arrest and his death.

The inquest concluded that Peter Lynch had died due to suicide after being reported for alleged racist comments and was waiting for an adjudication by the prison governor.
