= Manvers (disambiguation) =

Manvers is a suburb of Wath-upon-Dearne in South Yorkshire, England. Manvers may also refer to

- Manvers Main Colliery, a former coal mine on the northern edge of Wath-upon-Dearne, England
- Manvers Township in Ontario, Canada
- Earl Manvers, a title in the Peerage of the United Kingdom
- Lucy Manvers, leading character in the 2009 British TV drama The Unloved
