= Channel3Now =

Defunct news aggregation website

- Website type: News aggregator; fake news website
- Headquarters: Lahore, Pakistan
- Launched: 2023; 3 years ago
- Current status: Offline

Channel3Now (also stylised as Channel3 NOW) was a website based in Pakistan which aggregated crime news while presenting itself as an American-style TV channel. Launched in 2023, the website was shut down in August 2024 after sharing fake news which fuelled riots in the United Kingdom. On August 20, 2024, a person linked to the website was arrested in Pakistan on charges of cyberterrorism; the case was later dropped.

== History ==
Channel3Now was registered as a website with a domain server located in Ireland on 15 June 2023. According to Voice of America, the earliest archived versions of the Channel3Now site date back to September 2023. An OSINT investigation by the Institute for Strategic Dialogue indicated that an earlier version of the website was hosted at an address in Pakistan.

The website was previously known as Fox3 Now, Fox5 Now and Fox7 Now, leading to a legal dispute with the unrelated Fox Media LLC. In August 2023, an arbitration ruling ordered the website to transfer those domains to Fox Media LLC.

In July 2024, following the attempted assassination of Donald Trump, Channel3Now posted a video on its Rumble account falsely claiming that the perpetrator had been identified as a Chinese man. It also posted baseless claims on X/Twitter about the criminal history of Thomas Matthew Crooks, a white man who was later identified as the suspect and confirmed to have no criminal history.

=== Riots, arrest and shutdown ===
On 29 July 2024, Channel3Now posted a false article claiming that the 17-year-old charged in the Southport stabbing was a Muslim asylum seeker who had arrived in the UK by boat a year earlier. It also claimed he was under surveillance by MI6. The article was widely quoted in viral posts on social media.

On 31 July 2024, the website issued an apology, blaming its "misleading information" on the riots on a now-dismissed team of employees. Its YouTube channel and associated Facebook pages were suspended.

On 14 August 2024, an investigation by ITV News at Ten identified a person from Lahore, Pakistan as working for Channel3Now. The individual denied being responsible for the article, claimed he was merely a freelancer, and said three or four people were fired for publishing the false information. Channel3Now's website was shut down later that day.

On 20 August 2024, the same person was arrested by Pakistani police for spreading false information. The case was dropped six days later after police said they were unable to find evidence that the accused was the originator of the fake news article.

=== Speculation on Russian ties ===
In the aftermath of the riots, British media speculated that Channel3Now might be linked to Russian disinformation efforts, with a former head of MI6 endorsing the theory in an interview with The Telegraph. However, a BBC News investigation on 8 August 2024 found no evidence to back up the claim.

One source of this theory had been the presence of Russian-language content in the history of its YouTube channel. According to Channel3Now, it had purchased a former Russian-language YouTube channel and changed its name, initially posting video content related to Pakistan.
