= Saint Pius X Catholic High School, Rotherham =

Voluntary aided school in South Yorkshire, England

Saint Pius X Catholic High School A Specialist School in Humanities

Location
- Wath-upon-Dearne; Rotherham, South Yorkshire, S63 7PQ; England; 53.49140°N 1.33914°W

Information
- Type: Voluntary aided
- Motto: 'Love one another as I have loved you'
- Religious affiliation: Roman Catholic
- Established: 16 September 1957
- Local authority: Rotherham
- Trust: St Francis Catholic Multi Academy Trust
- Specialist: Humanities
- Department for Education URN: 152056 Tables
- Ofsted: Reports
- Headteacher: Laura Bullars
- Gender: Mixed
- Age: 11 to 16
- Enrolment: 679
- Houses: Lourdes, Walsingham, Fatima, Carmel and Guadalupe
- Colours: Red, Blue, Green, Yellow and Purple
- Former name: Pope Pius X Catholic High School (1957–2007)
- Website: www.saintpiusx.school

Saint Pius X Catholic High School A Specialist School in Humanities is a co-educational secondary school situated in Wath-upon-Dearne near Rotherham, South Yorkshire, England which caters for pupils aged 11 to 16. The school opened in September 1957 with 300 pupils.

In September 2007 it was awarded specialist status as a Humanities College, and was renamed from Pope Pius X Catholic High School to Saint Pius X Catholic High School A Specialist School in Humanities. It also has Investors in People accreditation.

The school was a voluntary aided school until 1 September 2025, when, as part of a reorganisation of Catholic education within the Diocese of Hallam, it became an academy within the St Francis Catholic Multi Academy Trust. It was the last secondary school in Rotherham to convert to academy status, six-and-a-half years after the penultimate school, the neighbouring Wath Academy.

== Ofsted inspections ==
Since the commencement of Ofsted inspections in September 1993, the school has undergone nine inspections:

Date of inspection	Outcome	Reference
25–?? April 1994	???	
11–?? January 1999	???	
3–6 November 2003	Satisfactory	Report
28 September 2007	Good	Report
29–30 November 2010	Satisfactory	Report
24–25 October 2012	Requires improvement	Report
16–17 September 2014	Good	Report
22 February 2018	Good	Report
28–29 September 2021	Requires improvement	Report

== Headteachers ==
- Mr Dave Caulfield, ????–???? (acting headteacher)
- Mrs Anne Winfield, September 2000–August 2009
- Eileen Gilmartin, September 2009–August 2011 (acting headteacher)
- Tony Bishop, September 2011–August 2016
- Ms Susan Smith, September 2016–December 2024 (died in post)
- Mrs Caroline Brown, December 2024–August 2025 (acting headteacher)
- Mrs Laura Bullars, September 2025 – present
