= Dearne Valley College =

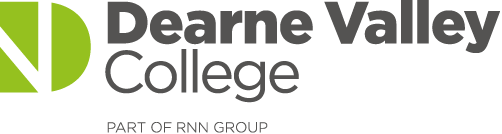

Location
- Manvers Park; Wath-upon-Dearne, South Yorkshire, S63 7EW; England; 53.498°N 1.316°W

Information
- Type: Further education
- Established: 1976
- Website: http://www.dearne-coll.ac.uk/

Dearne Valley College is a further education college situated in the Manvers Park area of Wath-upon-Dearne, in the Metropolitan Borough of Rotherham, South Yorkshire, England. It also has a campus near Wath-upon-Dearne town centre.

In September 2017 the college merged with the RNN Group. The college joined Rotherham College and North Nottinghamshire College as part of the group, but continues to retain its local identity and current campus based in Manvers.
