= Wath Hall =

Municipal building in Wath, South Yorkshire, England

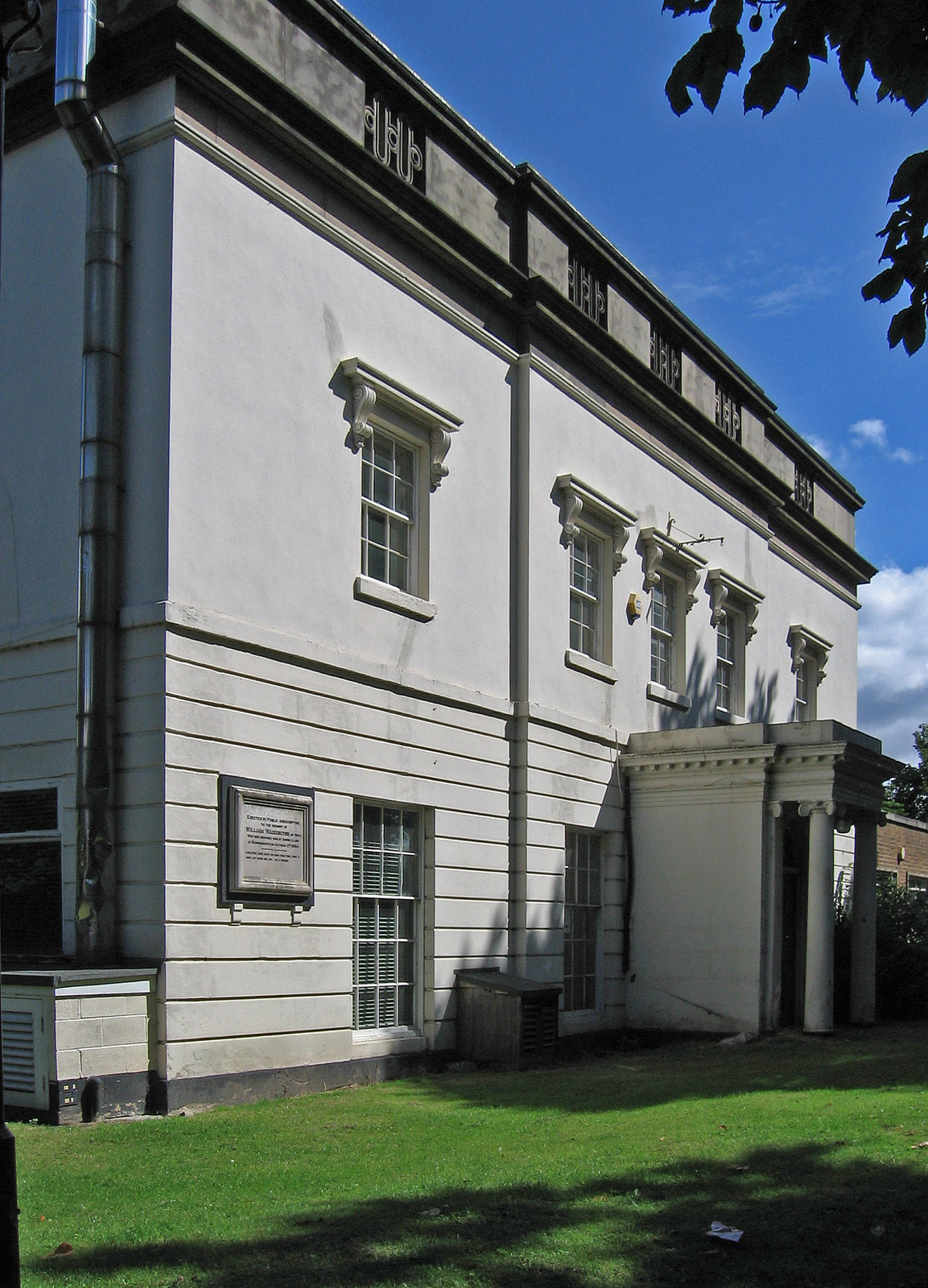
- Wath Hall

- Shown in South Yorkshire
- 53.5029°N 1.3484°W
- Location: Church Street, Wath upon Dearne

History
- Built: 1770

Site notes
- Architectural style: Neoclassical style

Listed Building – Grade II
- Official name: Town Hall
- Designated: 21 August 1985
- Reference no.: 1192631

Wath Hall is a former private residence and former municipal structure in Church Street, Wath upon Dearne, South Yorkshire, England. The hall, which was the headquarters of Wath upon Dearne Urban District Council, is a Grade II listed building.

== History ==
The area occupied by the town hall was originally the site of a manor house built for the Fleming family in the 14th century. Reiner le Fleming, who was lord of the manor of Wath upon Dearne, founded Kirklees Priory in 1155 during the reign of King Henry II. The current building was designed in the neoclassical style as a private residence, built in red brick rendered with cement and completed in 1770. The design involved a symmetrical main frontage with five bays facing onto Church Street; the central section of three bays, which slightly projected forward, featured a panelled door with a fanlight flanked by two Ionic order columns supporting a frieze and a modillioned cornice. There were sash windows in the other bays on the ground floor as well as in the bays on the first floor and a parapet at roof level.

The building was the home of a medical doctor, William Kaye, in the late 18th century. It was subsequently a school under the ownership of James Barton in the mid-19th century before being occupied by Captain William Armitage Earnshaw in the 1870s. Its last private owner was Frederick Johnson.

Following significant population growth, largely associated with coal mining, the newly appointed local improvement commissioners decided to acquire the building for £2,500 in 1892. The town went on to become an urban district with Wath Hall as its headquarters in 1894. A plaque commemorating the life of William Waddington, who had died while saving a baby in the sea at Bournemouth on 2 October 1904, was installed on the face of the building in the early 20th century. A council chamber, with a herringbone pattern parquet floor and a glass cupola, was created on the first floor of the building in 1926 and a soup kitchen was also established in the building to provide food for local workers and their families during the 1926 general strike.

The building continued to serve as the headquarters of Wath upon Dearne Urban District Council Council for much of the 20th century but ceased to be the local seat of government when the enlarged Rotherham Metropolitan Borough Council was formed in 1972. The council continued to use the building as workspace for local community teams until 2011. After a local fund raising campaign launched in 2015, the building was acquired by a charitable trust in July 2020: the local member of parliament, John Healey, planted a tree to commemorate the event in December 2020.

== See also ==
- Listed buildings in Wath upon Dearne
