= Listed buildings in Wath upon Dearne =

Wath upon Dearne is a town in the Metropolitan Borough of Rotherham, South Yorkshire, England. The town and surrounding area contain 16 listed buildings that are recorded in the National Heritage List for England. Of these, one is listed at Grade I, the highest of the three grades, and the others are at Grade II, the lowest grade. The listed buildings include houses, farmhouses and farm buildings, two churches, a former town hall, a public house, a former smithy, a former lock-up, and a mausoleum.

== Key ==
Grade	Criteria
I	Buildings of exceptional interest, sometimes considered to be internationally important
II	Buildings of national importance and special interest

== Buildings ==
Name and location	Photograph	Date	Notes	Grade
All Saints Church; 53.50293°N 1.34939°W		12th century	The church has been altered and extended through the centuries, and was restored between 1866 and 1871. It is built in sandstone, with a roof of lead on the nave, tiles on the chancel and aisles, and stone slate on the north chapel. The church consists of a nave with a clerestory, north and south aisles, a south porch, a chancel with a south organ chamber, a north chapel with a west aisle, a north vestry, and a west steeple. The steeple has a tower with a south door and clock face, a string course, two-light bell openings, corner gargoyles, an embattled parapet with crocketed pinnacles, and a recessed octagonal spire. There are embattled parapets on the nave, porch and aisles.	I
Hall Farmhouse; 53.49600°N 1.35555°W		1690	The farmhouse is in sandstone with a Welsh slate roof. There are two storeys and an attic, a front of three bays, an outshut on the rear left, and a rear wing on the right with a single-storey extension. The doorway has a quoined surround, and a deep lintel containing an inscribed and dated panel. The windows on the front are horizontally-sliding sashes, and over the ground floor openings is a continuous hood mould. In the right return are mullioned windows with some mullions removed.	II
Dovecote and cowhouse, Brook Farm; 53.50388°N 1.34933°W	—	Early 18th century	The cowhouse with a dovecote above are in sandstone, with quoins, a hipped stone slate roof, and two storeys. In the ground floor is a doorway flanked by casement windows, and in the upper part are a casement window and a doorway, and between them is a Venetian window.	II
25 and 27 Church Street; 53.50231°N 1.34690°W	—	Early to mid 18th century	A house later incorporating a shop, it is in sandstone, partly rendered, with quoins, and a pantile roof with coped gables and shaped kneelers. There are three storeys, three bays, a two-storey rear wing on the right, and an extension in the angle. On the left is a projecting shop front and a doorway with a quoined surround. The central window in the middle floor and all the windows in the top floor are mullioned with two lights, and the other windows are inserted casements.	II
Cartshed behind 22 High Street; 53.50233°N 1.34307°W	—	1745	The cartshed is in sandstone with quoins and a hipped stone slate roof. It is a rectangular building with two storeys, and contains two segmental-arched cart entries. In the right return are two-light mullioned windows, and an upper floor doorway with a quoined surround and a dated keystone tooled on the lintel.	II
54 and 56 High Street; 53.50264°N 1.34006°W	—	Mid 18th century	The house, which was extended in the 19th century, is in sandstone, with quoins, and a Welsh slate roof with coped gables and shaped kneelers. There are two storeys, a main block of two bays, and flanking lower single-bay wings. The doorway has an architrave, plinth blocks, and a cornice, and the windows in the main block are sashes with projecting surrounds, sunken panels, paterae and cornices. In the left wing is an elliptical bay window with an apron, a pulvinated frieze and a cornice.	II
Newhill Grange Farmhouse; 53.49933°N 1.35883°W	—	Mid 18th century	The farmhouse is in sandstone, with quoins, a floor band, and a roof in Welsh slate and stone slate with coped gables and shaped kneelers. There are two storeys, a main range of four bays, a cross-wing on the right with a cellar and attic, and a rear wing on the left. The doorway has a partly quoined surround, and the windows on the front are casements. In the wing are sash windows, and at the rear of the main range are mullioned windows.	II
2, 2A, 2B, 2C and 4, 4A, 4B and 4C High Street; 53.50239°N 1.34450°W	—	Mid to late 18th century	A house, later divided into shops and offices, it is in sandstone, partly rendered, with chamfered quoins, and a Welsh slate roof with coped gables and shaped kneelers. There are two storeys and a gabled front of two bays. In the ground floor are shop fronts, one incorporating earlier cast iron columns, a doorway with a quoined surround, and a stair window. The upper floor contains sash windows.	II
Wath Hall; 53.50289°N 1.34858°W		1770	A house, at one time the town hall, it is stuccoed, on a plinth, and has a band-rusticated ground floor, a floor band, a frieze, a cornice, and a parapet with recessed panels. There are two storeys and cellars, a double-depth plan, and a symmetrical front of five bays, the middle three bays projecting. In the centre is a porch and a doorway with Ionic columns, a fanlight, a pulvinated frieze, a modillion cornice, and a blocking course. The windows are sashes with cornices on consoles. At the rear are four bays, the middle two bays projecting. In the outer bays are single-storey canted bay windows with pierced balustrades.	II
44 and 46 Sandygate; 53.50151°N 1.34267°W	—	1771	A pair of mirror-image cottages in sandstone with a stone slate roof. There are three storeys and a cellar, and in the centre are paired doorways with bonded surrounds. The windows are horizontally-sliding sashes.	II
Brook Farmhouse; 53.50363°N 1.34919°W	—	Late 18th or early 19th century	The farmhouse is in sandstone, partly rendered, on a plinth, with sill bands and a hipped stone slate roof. There are three storeys, a main range of three bays, a single-storey extension on the right, and a rear wing on the right with a two-storey extension. The central doorway has an architrave, a fanlight, a festooned frieze, and a pediment. The windows are sashes, the window over the doorway with an architrave, a festooned frieze, and a segmental pediment.	II
Church House; 53.50201°N 1.34532°W		c. 1810	A private house, later a public house, it is in sandstone, with a rusticated ground floor, a plinth, bands, a dentilled cornice, a blocking course, and a hipped Welsh slate roof. There are two storeys, a symmetrical front of three bays, and a rear wing of three storeys. On the front, the middle bay is recessed, and contain steps leading to an open porch with paired fluted Doric columns, a cornice with mutules, and a round arch containing a doorway. The outer bays contain two-storey canted bay windows. The windows are sashes, the window above the porch with a balustrade. In the left return is another Doric porch.	II
34 Sandygate; 53.50190°N 1.34361°W	—	Early 19th century	A smithy, later converted for residential use, it is in sandstone with a stone slate roof. It has a single storey, three bays, and a two-storey parallel range at the rear on the left. On the front is a doorway and horizontally-sliding sash windows, all with deep lintels.	II
Parish lock-up 53.50279°N 1.35063°W	—	Early 19th century	The former lock-up is in sandstone on a plinth, and has a stone slate roof with coped gables and kneelers. There are two storeys, and a rectangular plan. On the front is a porch with monolithic jambs, and a pediment-shaped stone hood, above which is a window. At the rear is a stair projection and a doorway.	II
Mausoleum; 53.49703°N 1.35146°W		1834	The mausoleum in Newhill Park is in sandstone on a plinth, with chamfered quoins, a cornice, and a stepped pyramidal sandstone roof. There is a single storey and a square plan. On each front is a round-arched recess with alternating chamfered voussoirs, and a sunken apron panel.	II
St Joseph's Church, presbytery and wall 53.50232°N 1.33681°W		1878–79	The church and presbytery are built in sandstone with red tile roofs. The church consists of a nave and chancel under one roof, a north porch, a north organ chamber, and a south sacristy and confessional. On the junction of the nave and chancel is a bell turret with a spire. The porch has a doorway with a pointed arch and a hood mould, above which is a protecting crocketed niche containing a statue of Saint Joseph. Attached to the church by a passage is the presbytery, with two storeys and five bays. The boundary wall is in coped stone, and it contains gateways flanked by piers on deep plinths with shaped caps.	II
