= Operation Early Dawn =

British emergency measure

Operation Early Dawn is a temporary emergency measure used to alleviate prison overcrowding in the United Kingdom. Under the procedure, which was first implemented in October 2022, prisoners are held in police custody and not called to a magistrate's court hearing until a place becomes available for them in the prison system. The measure is triggered by the UK Government when prison capacity is deemed to be under pressure.

Notable examples of when the measures have been activated include May 2024, when the number of prison places fell below 300. It was also triggered on 19 August as a result of the prosecution of a large number of individuals for their roles in the riots that occurred in July and August of that year. On that occasion, the measures were put in place in the north of England and the Midlands. Jo Stevens, the Secretary of State for Wales, said that the measures would be in force for "a very short period", typically "a matter of days, or at the most months".
