= Anthony Arkwright =

British spree killer

- Born: 1967 (age 58–59); Wath upon Dearne, South Yorkshire , England
- Years active: 1988
- Known for: Murder; Spree killing
- Criminal charge: Three counts of murder
- Criminal penalty: Life imprisonment (Whole-life tariff)
- Criminal status: In prison

Anthony Arkwright is a convicted British spree killer who, over the course of 56 hours in August 1988, murdered three people in Wath-upon-Dearne, South Yorkshire. Arkwright is also suspected of murdering a fourth person during his killing spree, the charge of which Arkwright's trial judge ordered to lie on file. Arkwright was 21 years old at the time of the killings and was 22 when he was convicted, making him the youngest person in the UK to be subject to a whole-life order.

== Background ==
Anthony Arkwright was born in the mining community of Wath-upon-Dearne, in what was then the West Riding of Yorkshire. He is one of five siblings who were abandoned by their mother at an early age; his father was a miner. Arkwright spent most of his childhood in care homes and performed badly at school, drifting into a life of crime and a sentence in a borstal. Rumours persisted that he was the product of an incestuous relationship between his mother and his grandfather. By the time he was 21, Arkwright was working for scrap merchants in Mexborough, South Yorkshire, but he was sacked on 26 August 1988 for a poor attendance record. It was after this sacking that the 56-hour killing spree began.

== Murders and arrests ==
Following his dismissal, Arkwright returned to Adwick road in Mexborough, where he stabbed his grandfather, 68-year-old Stanislav Pudoikas, at his allotment. This resulted in Pudoikas suffering paralysis. Arkwright then dragged Pudoikas into a shed and used a 14-pound (6.4 kg) lump hammer to crush his skull. After killing his grandfather, Arkwright went on a pub crawl in Mexborough and dropped hints about the murder, saying things such as, "It's been murder on the allotment today." It was believed that Arkwright's second victim was his grandfather's housekeeper, 73-year-old Elsa Kronadaite, whilst he was in the process of taking his grandfather's savings of £3,000. The bodies of both Pudoikis and Kronadaite lay undiscovered for six days.

The next to be killed was Arkwright's neighbour Raymond Ford, an unemployed former teacher who was already being bullied by him. Arkwright had also stolen items from Ford's flat and Ford reported him to the police for the thefts. Arkwright knew this and wanted revenge. At 3 am on 28 August 1988, he entered Ford's flat completely naked apart from a devil mask. Arkwright stabbed Ford between 250 and 540 times and draped his entrails around the room that he had been murdered in. He then went home to shower off the blood and at 7 am, the police came to arrest him for burgling Ford's flat, completely unaware that Ford lay dead next door. After being interviewed for three hours and then released on police bail for a court appearance the following week, Arkwright went out for another drinking session, amazed at being a murderer allowed to walk free from a police station.

On 29 August, early in the morning, Arkwright entered the specially adapted bungalow belonging to his other next-door neighbour, Marcus Law. Law, who was 25 at the time, was in a wheelchair after a motorbike accident. In what Arkwright would describe as a punishment for all the cigarettes that Law had scrounged off him, he stabbed Law at least 70 times, before trying to gut him. When this failed, Arkwright inserted one of Law's crutches into a gaping wound in his stomach. He also gouged out Law's eyes and inserted cigarettes into his eye sockets, ears and mouth.

Law's mother found her son's body. Police arrested Arkwright, who confessed to four murders, which meant that searches for the bodies of his other victims had to be organised hastily. It was suggested that when shocked police had found the three remaining bodies, Arkwright felt that he was losing control, and so invented a fifth victim, leading to further searches of lakes and drainage ditches.

Whilst at HMP Hull awaiting trial, Arkwright smeared the walls of his cell with his faeces in a dirty protest at not being recognised and revered as he believed he should be. After convincing prison doctors that he was insane, he was transferred to Rampton Hospital in Nottinghamshire. Psychiatrists there determined that he was sane and fit to plead, with one doctor commenting that Arkwright was "the sanest person in the building".

== Trial ==
At his trial in Sheffield Crown Court in July 1989, Arkwright pleaded guilty and was sentenced to life imprisonment. It was commented upon that Arkwright was an "evil fantasist" who had a desire to be as famous as Jack the Ripper. The case against Arkwright for killing Kronadaite was unproven and at the trial, the judge ordered the case to lie on file.

In 2003, Home Secretary David Blunkett changed the law so that certain people sentenced to life in prison, would spend the rest of their lives there, with no chance of parole. This was challenged in 2013, when the European Court of Human Rights decreed that whole-life tariffs without the option for a review or parole amounted to inhuman and degrading treatment. However, the Court of Appeal ruled that the whole-life sentences were "entirely compatible" with the European Convention of Human Rights.

== In the media ==
=== Television ===
The television programme When Life Means Life broadcast an episode about Arkwright in its first series in 2012. Arkwright was the subject of Britain’s Most Evil Killers episode 9 season 4, broadcast 14 April 2020.

=== Podcast ===
Arkwright's case was featured in episode 168 of the dark comedy podcast series, Small Town Murder.
