= Matthew Feldman (historian) =

Anglo-American historian, literary critic and political scientist (born 1977)

Matthew Feldman (born 1977) is an Anglo-American historian, literary critic and political scientist. As Emeritus Professor in the Modern History of Ideas at Teesside University. Feldman specializes in fascism and the far right in Europe and the United States. He consults on neo-Nazi terrorism, hate crimes and radical right extremism for Academic Consulting Services.

Feldman is the author of more than a dozen books on political extremism, and a dozen books that relate to the leading modernist writers Ezra Pound and Samuel Beckett, including Politics, Intellectuals and Faith (2020); Falsifying Beckett (2015); Ezra Pound's Fascist Propaganda, 1935–1945 (2013); and Beckett's Books (2006). Feldman is currently at work on a global history of fascism.

== Education ==
Feldman was awarded a BA in modern history and English in 1999, an MA in the history of fascism in 2000, and a PhD in 2004 for a thesis entitled "Sourcing 'Aporetics': An Empirical Study on Philosophical Influences in the Development of Samuel Beckett's Writings". All his degrees were completed at Oxford Brookes University.

== Career ==
After teaching history part-time at Oxford Brookes and the University of Northampton, Feldman was appointed in 2008 as senior lecturer in 20th-century history at Northampton. In 2012 he became Reader in Contemporary History at Teesside and in June 2014 Professor in the Modern History of Ideas. As of 2017 he was co-director of Teesside's Centre for Fascist, Anti-fascist and Post-fascist Studies (CFAPS). Since 2018, Feldman has been Director of Academic Consulting Services.

Feldman's historical work includes studies of historical fascism and the far right, and also pays attention to the politics of language in the rhetoric of the radical right and in Holocaust denial.

Feldman has also undertaken more public work, including media appearances and op-eds, and featured as a keynote or featured speaker on the far right in several venues. Feldman has worked for the UK's National Expert Witness Agency, authoring 22 expert reports and appearing as witness in 20 trials.

== Bibliography ==
=== Literary and Cultural Criticism ===
- (2024) The Bloomsbury Handbook of Modernist Archives (https://www.bloomsbury.com/uk/bloomsbury-handbook-of-modernist-archives-9781350450554/). London: Bloomsbury.
- (2021) (with Erik Tonning and Anna Svendsen, eds.), Historicizing Modernists: Approaches to ‘Archivalism'. London: Bloomsbury.
- (2020) with Steven Matthews (eds.). Samuel Beckett's 'Philosophy Notes'. Oxford: Oxford University Press. ISBN 978-0198734864
- (2017) (with David Addyman and Erik Tonning, eds.), Samuel Beckett and BBC Radio: An Empirical Reassessment. Basingstoke: Palgrave.
- (2015). Falsifying Beckett: Essays on Archives, Philosophy, and Methodology in Beckett Studies. Stuttgart: Columbia University Press/Ibidem Press.
- (2014) (with Erik Tonning and David Addyman, eds.), Modernism, Christianity and Apocalypse. Leiden: Brill.
- (2014) (with Erik Tonning and Henry Mead), Broadcasting in the Modernist Era, 1922-1962. London: Bloomsbury.
- (2013). Ezra Pound's Fascist Propaganda, 1935–1945. Basingstoke: Palgrave Macmillan.
- (2012) (with Karim Mamdani, eds.) Beckett/Philosophy. Sofia: Sofia University Press [first appearing as Special Issue of Sofia Philosophical Review 5/1 (2011)].
- (2010) (with Erik Tonning, Matthew Feldman, Matthijs Engelberts and Dirk van Hulle, eds.), Samuel Beckett: Debts and Legacies, Samuel Beckett Today/Aujourd’Hui, 22 (2010)
- (2009) (with Steve Barfield and Philip Tew) Beckett and Death. London: Continuum.
- (2009) (with Mark Nixon, eds.) The International Reception of Samuel Beckett. London: Continuum.
- (2009) Beckett and Phenomenology. London: Continuum.
- (2007) (with Mark Nixon, eds.), Beckett’s Literary Legacies (Cambridge: Cambridge Scholars Press, 2007)
- (2006). Beckett's Books: A Cultural History of the Interwar Notes. London: Bloomsbury/Continuum. ISBN 978-0826490599

=== History and Politics ===
- (forthcoming, 2027) The Bloomsbury Handbook of Far-Right Fiction. London: Bloomsbury.
- (forthcoming, 2027) Full-Circle? A Brief History of Fascism. New Haven: Yale University Press.
- (forthcoming, 2026) Subjects and Occasions: Articles, Comment Pieces, and Reviews on the Far Right, 2 vols. (vol.1 edited by Karim Mamdani; vol. 2 edited by Kate Yanduganova). Stuttgart: Columbia University Press/Ibidem Press.
- (2020). Politics, Intellectuals and Faith: Essays by Matthew Feldman. Stuttgart: Columbia University Press/Ibidem Press.
- (2017) (with Jorge Dagnino and Paul Stocker, eds.) The 'New Man' in Radical Right Ideology and Practice, 1919–1945. London: Bloomsbury.
- (2016) (with John Pollard, eds.) ‘Fascist Ideologues Past and Present’, Special Issue of Patterns of Prejudice, 50/4-5.
- (2014) (with Paul Jackson, eds.) Doublespeak: The Rhetoric of the Far-Right since 1945. Stuttgart: Columbia University Press/Ibidem Press.
- (2013) (with Paul Jackson, eds.) ‘Populist Racism and Lone-Wolf Terrorism in Democratic States’, eds. Matthew Feldman and Paul Jackson, Democracy & Security, Special Issue, 8/3.
- (2008) (ed.) A Fascist Century: Essays by Roger Griffin. Basingstoke: Palgrave.
- (2007) (with Marius Turda and Tudor Georgescu, eds.) ‘Clerical Fascism’ in Interwar Europe (London: Routledge; revised and reissued in paperback, 2011) [first appearing as Special Issue of Totalitarian Movements and Political Religions 8/2 (2007)]
- (2004) (with Roger Griffin, eds.) Fascism: Critical Concepts in Political Science. Vol 1–5. London: Routledge.
