= Wath upon Dearne =

Town in South Yorkshire, England

Coordinates: 53.5022°N 1.3402°W

- Town
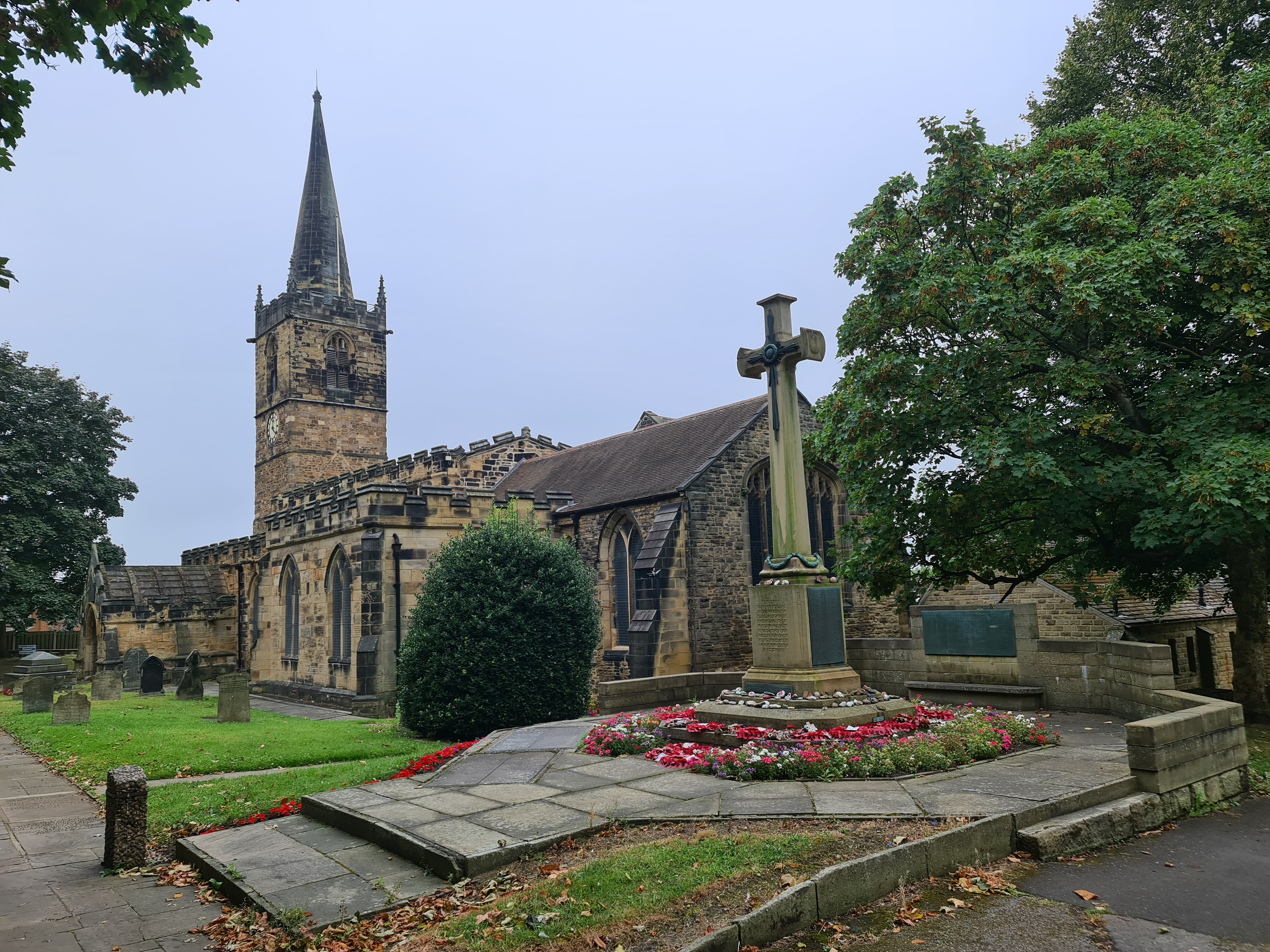
- All Saints Church

- Location within South Yorkshire
- Population: 16,964 (cite 2021 census)
- OS grid reference: SE438008
- Metropolitan borough: Rotherham
- Metropolitan county: South Yorkshire
- Region: Yorkshire and the Humber
- Country: England
- Sovereign state: United Kingdom
- Post town: ROTHERHAM
- Postcode district: S63
- Dialling code: 01709
- Police: South Yorkshire
- Fire: South Yorkshire
- Ambulance: Yorkshire
- UK Parliament: Wentworth and Dearne

Wath upon Dearne (shortened to Wath /ˈwɒθ/ or often hyphenated) is a town south of the River Dearne in the Metropolitan Borough of Rotherham, South Yorkshire, England, 5 miles (8 km) north of Rotherham and almost midway between Barnsley and Doncaster. It had a population of 11,816 at the 2011 census. It is twinned with Saint-Jean-de-Bournay in France.

== History ==
Wath can be traced to Norman times. It appears in the 1086 Domesday Book as Wad and Waith. It remained for some centuries a rural settlement astride the junction of the old Doncaster–Barnsley and Rotherham–Pontefract roads, the latter a branch of Ryknield Street. North of the town was a ford across the River Dearne. The name has been linked to the Latin vadum and the Old Norse vath (ford or wading place). The town received a royal charter in 1312–1313 entitling it to a weekly Tuesday market and an annual two-day fair, but these were soon discontinued. The market was revived in 1814.

Until local government reorganisation in 1974, Wath was in the historic county of the West Riding of Yorkshire. Until the mid-19th century the town had a racecourse of regional importance, linked to the estate at nearby Wentworth. This fell into disuse, but traces of it can be seen between Wath and Swinton and it is remembered in street names. There was a pottery at Newhill, close to deposits of clay, but it was overshadowed by the nearby Rockingham Pottery in Swinton. About the turn of the 19th century, the poet and newspaper editor James Montgomery, resident at the time, called it "the Queen of Villages". This rural character changed rapidly in the 19th and 20th centuries, as coal mining developed. From 1892 to 1974 Wath Hall served as the local seat of government for Wath upon Dearne.

=== Coal mining ===
The town lies over the South Yorkshire coalfield, where high-quality bituminous coal was dug from outcrops and near-surface seams in primitive bell pits for several centuries. Several high-grade seams are close to the surface, including the prolific Barnsley and Parkgate. The rising demand for coal arose from rapid local industrialisation in the 19th and early 20th century. The population swelled and local infrastructure developed round the coal-mining, but this reliance on one industry led to future problems.

The Dearne and Dove Canal opened in stages from 1798 to 1804 to access the collieries on the south side of the Dearne Valley. It passed through the town on an embankment just north of the High Street and then turned north into the valley. This wide section was known locally as the "Bay of Biscay". The canal closed in 1961 after many years of disuse and poor repair. Much of the canal line has since been used for roads, one of them called Biscay Way.

By the 20th century, heavy industry was evident, with many large collieries – Wath Main and Manvers Main were the two usually mentioned. After the Second World War, the collieries clustered around Manvers developed into a complex, also covering coal preparation, coal products and a coking plant, which was not only visible, but polluted the air for miles around.

=== Railways ===
Rail took over coal transportation from the canal. Wath upon Dearne became a rail-freight centre of national importance. Wath marshalling yard, built north of the town in 1907, was one of the biggest and for its time one of the most modern railway marshalling yards in the country, as one of the eastern ends of the trans-Pennine Manchester–Sheffield–Wath electrified railway (also known as the Woodhead Line), a project that spanned the Second World War and partly responded to the need to move large amounts of Wath coal to customers in North-West England.

Wath once had three railway stations: Wath Central in Moor Road, Wath (Hull and Barnsley) and Wath North both in Station Road. Wath North, the most distant, was the last to close in 1968, under the Beeching Axe. There has been talk of opening a station on the Sheffield–Wakefield–Leeds line at Manvers, roughly a mile from the town centre.

=== The decline of coal ===
The local coal industry succumbed to a dramatic decline in the British coal-mining industry precipitated by a change in government economic policy in the early 1980s. This had knock-on effects on many subsidiary local industries and caused local hardship.

The 1985 miners' strike was sparked by the impending closure of Cortonwood Colliery in Brampton Bierlow, a neighbouring village often seen as part of Wath. Along with the whole of the Dearne Valley, Wath was classified as an impoverished area and received public money, including European funds. These were put to regenerating the area from the mid-1990s onwards, causing a degree of economic revival. It made the area more rural, as much land to the north of the town once used by collieries and marshalling yards was returned to scrubland and countryside, dotted with light industrial and commercial office parks. This regeneration of what was still classified as brownfield land has involved building it over with industrial and commercial parks. Large housing developments have also been started.

== Today ==
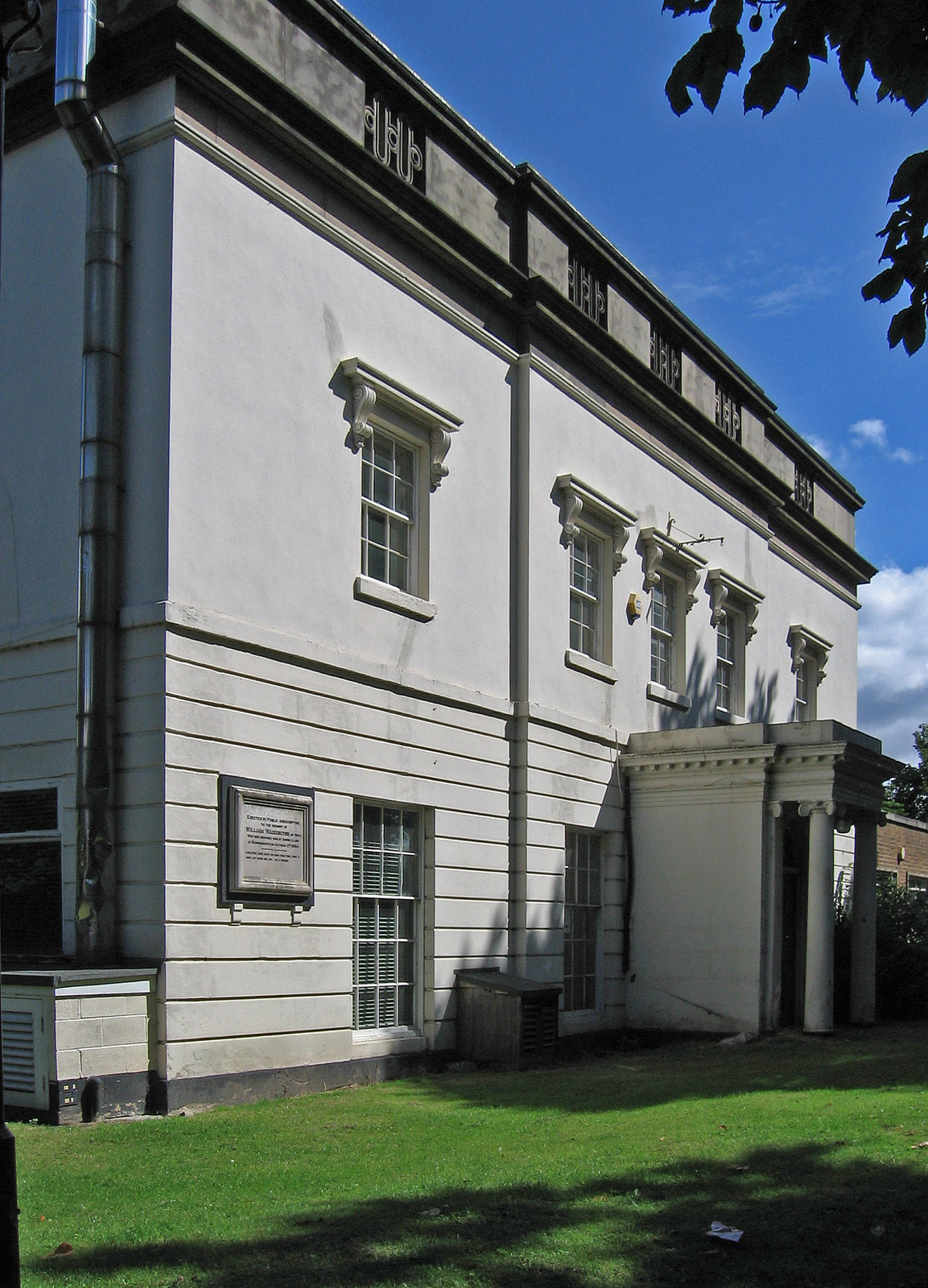
Wath Hall

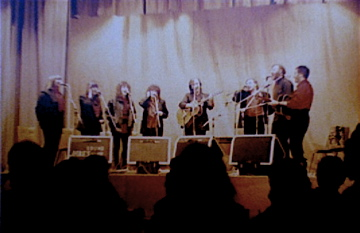
Blue Murder live at Montgomery Hall, Wath-upon-Dearne in 1987

Wath upon Dearne centres on Montgomery Square, with the town's main shops, the library and the bus station. To its west is the substantial Norman All Saints Church, on a small leafy green, with Wath Hall, the Montgomery Hall and a campus of the Dearne Valley College.

Today Wath is still emerging from the coal-industry collapse, although jobs and some low-level affluence have returned. After a hiatus between the clearing of former colliery land and recent redevelopment, when the area felt rather rural, the construction of large distribution centres to the north of the town is restoring an industrial feel, but without the pollution issues of coal. Several distribution warehouses for the clothing chain Next have opened. Much new housing is being built on reclaimed land.

Wath Festival, held round the early May bank holiday, is a folk and acoustic music and arts festival founded by members of the Wath Morris Dancing Team in 1972. It has grown to host known names on the folk, acoustic and world music scene. While festival events occur across the town, most larger concerts are held at the Montgomery Hall Theatre and Community Venue. Those appearing have included Dougie MacLean, Fairport Convention, Martin Simpson, John Tams, Frances Black, John McCusker, Stacey Earle and Eddi Reader.

The festival marked its 40th anniversary in 2012. Wath won Village Festival Of The Year in the 2013 FATEA Awards. The festival has been a supporter of young artists such as Lucy Ward, and Greg Russell & Ciaran Algar. It has also hosted the Wath Festival Young Performers' Award, founded in 2011.

The event includes dancing by local morris and sword-dancing groups, street performances, workshops, children's events and a Saturday morning parade from Montgomery Hall through Montgomery Square and back to St James's Church, for a traditional throwing of bread buns from the parish church tower. Local schools, organisations and local Labour MP John Healey have joined in festival activities.

The RSPB's Old Moor nature reserve lies a mile to the north-west of the town. It occupies a "flash", where mining-induced subsidence of land close to a river has created wetlands.

== Sport ==
Wath Athletic F.C. served the community from the 1880s to the Second World War, playing in the Midland League and reaching the 1st Round of the FA Cup in 1926. No senior team has represented the settlement since the 1950s, and Wath remains one of the largest places in Yorkshire without one. However, it has a Rugby Union team that plays in the Yorkshire First Division after promotion in the 2023–24 season.

== Education ==
The four primary schools for ages 3–11 are Our Lady and St Joseph's Catholic Primary, Wath Central Primary, Wath C of E Primary and Wath Victoria Primary. The two secondary schools are Saint Pius X Catholic High School (for ages 11–16 ) and the larger Wath Academy, which has a sixth form and covers 11–18-year-olds, which was the result of an amalgamation between the Wath Grammar School and the Wath (Park Road) Secondary Modern School in January 1964. Both take students from a wider area.

A large further education college, Dearne Valley College, based in Wath, has a main campus at Manvers and a smaller one near the town centre.

== Media ==
Local news and television programmes is provided by BBC Yorkshire and ITV Yorkshire. Television signals are received from the Emley Moor TV transmitter. Local radio stations are BBC Radio Sheffield, Greatest Hits Radio Yorkshire (formerly Dearne FM), Heart Yorkshire, Capital Yorkshire, Hallam FM and Rockingham Radio, a community based station which broadcast from the town. The town is served by the local newspaper, Rotherham Advertiser.

== Transport ==
Wath-upon-Dearne bus station

General information
- Location: Montgomery Road, Wath-upon-Dearne town centre Rotherham (S63 7RA); England
- Owner: Rotherham Metropolitan Borough Council
- Operator: Travel South Yorkshire
- Bus stands: 4
- Bus operators: Stagecoach Yorkshire

Construction
- Parking: No
- Cycle facilities: Yes
- Accessible: Yes
Location

Wath-upon-Dearne bus station in Montgomery Road in the town centre provides the main public-transport hub. It has four bus stands on an otherwise pedestrianised section of Montgomery Road, next to Montgomery Square, High Street and the Wath-upon-Dearne Community Library. The bus station's one-way system down Montgomery Road is accessed from the B6097 Biscay Way to the north and feeds buses out into Church Street to the south.

The land is owned by the local council, Rotherham Metropolitan Borough Council, not the South Yorkshire Passenger Transport Executive. As such, it is not listed as an official SYPTE Interchange, despite its relative size, and it lacks a ticket office, waiting room and toilet facilities.

The first section of the Manvers link road was opened on Thursday August 17 1995, by Oliver Eden, 8th Baron Henley; construction had started in late August 1993, with 1.4km from the Golden Smithies roundabout to Station Road.

=== Services ===
As of June 2025, the stand allocation is:

Stand	Route	Destination
WS1	22X	Barnsley via Wombwell (Stagecoach)
WS1	226	Barnsley via Wombwell and Stairfoot (Stagecoach)
WS2	72	Chapeltown via Manvers, Elsecar, Hoyland, Tankersley and High Green (Stagecoach)
WS2	216	Cortonwood via West Melton and Brampton Bierlow (Stagecoach)
WS3	226	Thurnscoe via Bolton-upon-Dearne and Goldthorpe (Stagecoach)
WS4	216	Rotherham via Manvers, Mexborough, Swinton, Kilnhurst, Rawmarsh and Parkgate (Stagecoach)
WS4	22X	Rotherham via Manvers, Rawmarsh and Parkgate (Stagecoach)
WS4	72	Swinton via Manvers (Stagecoach)

== Notable people ==
- Anthony Arkwright (born 1967), spree killer, was convicted in 1989 of murdering three people in 1988.
- David Bret (born 1954), show-business biographer, born in Paris, was adopted into a family (Spurr) here, and attended Wath Grammar School in 1961–1966.
- Rob Dawber (1956–2001) was scriptwriter for the Ken Loach film, The Navigators.
- Simon Farnaby (born 1973), actor, plays characters in the CBBC TV show Horrible Histories.
- William Hague, Baron Hague of Richmond (born 1961), once leader of the Conservative Party and cabinet minister, was a pupil at Wath Comprehensive School.
- Peter Hardy, Baron Hardy of Wath (1931–2003), longstanding local Labour MP, was born and educated in Wath.
- Daisy Makeig-Jones (1881–1945), sculptor for Wedgwood, was born in the town.
- William Keble Martin (1877–1969), botanist, botanical illustrator and Anglican Vicar of Wath, is remembered in the name Keble Martin Way.
- Ian McMillan (born 1956), poet sometimes called the Bard of Barnsley, attended the town secondary school when a Grammar School.
- James Montgomery (1771–1854), Scottish-born poet and Sheffield newspaper editor, lived in Wath in the early 19th century. He is remembered in Montgomery Hall and Montgomery Square.
- Sir Charles Curran (1921–1980), Director-General of the BBC, 1969–1977, was educated in Wath.
- George Robledo (Jorge, 1926–1989), Chilean national and footballer, lived in a house later held by David Bret and his parents. He played for Huddersfield, Barnsley and Newcastle United, scoring winning goal for the last in the 1952 FA cup final against Arsenal.
- Ted Robledo (Eduardo, 1928–1970), brother of George, also played for Huddersfield, Barnsley and Newcastle United.

== See also ==
- Listed buildings in Wath upon Dearne
