= Pete Lynch (musician) =

American singer-songwriter

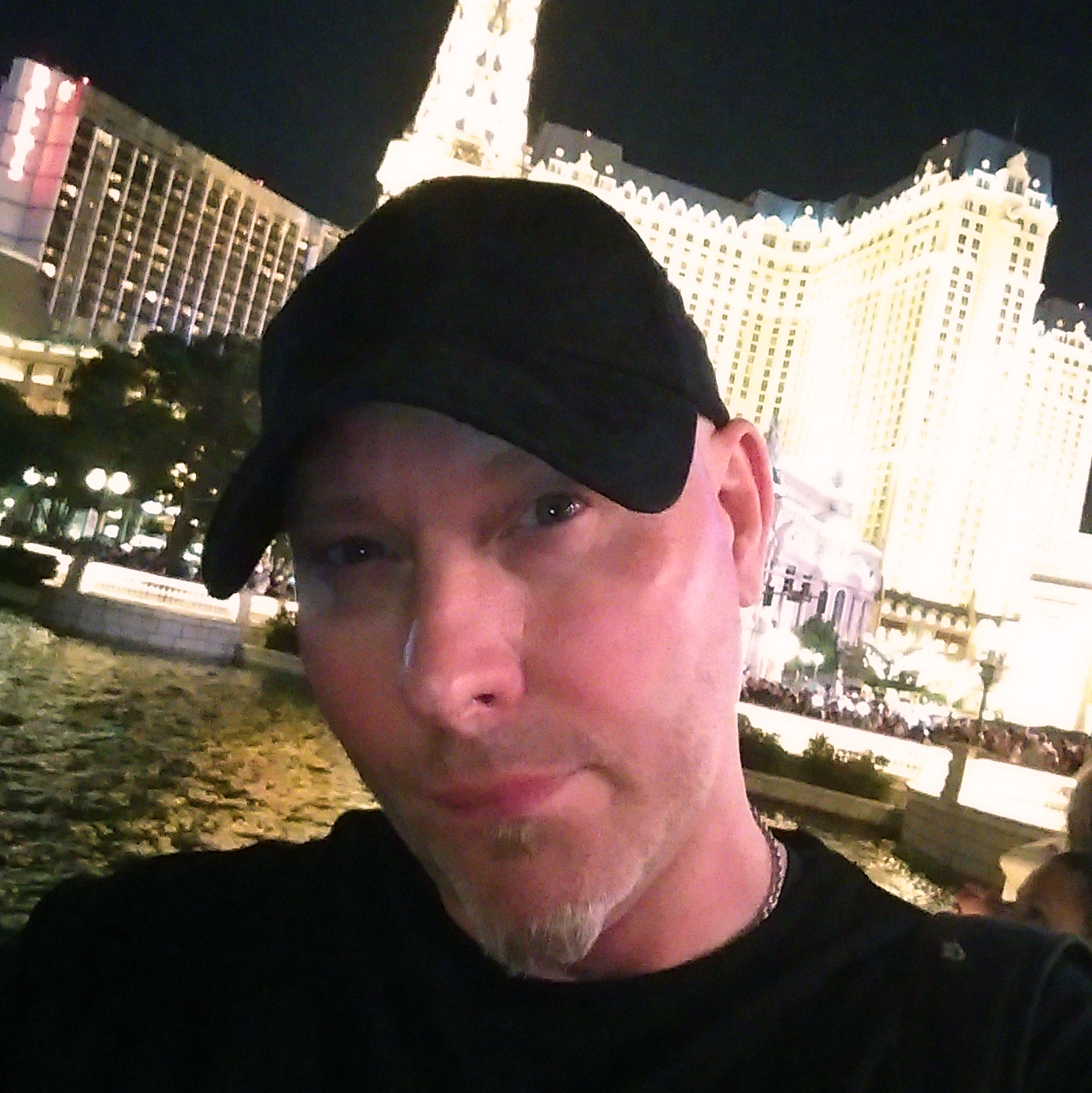
- Pete Lynch in Las Vegas 2017

Background information
- Born: Silver Spring, Maryland, US
- Origin: Maryland, United States
- Genres: Alternative rock, rock, progressive rock, pop rock
- Occupations: Singer-songwriter; multi-instrumentalist; composer; writer; record producer
- Instruments: Vocals, bass guitar, guitar, keyboards, percussion
- Years active: 2010–present
- Website: petelynchmusic.com

Pete Lynch (born March 31, in Silver Spring, Maryland) is an American singer, songwriter and multi-instrumentalist. In addition to singing lead and backing vocals, Lynch plays bass, guitar, keyboards and percussion.

== Early life ==
Pete Lynch was born in Silver Spring, Maryland, on March 31. He is the son of an English teacher and a Czech dissident and university professor, who fled Czechoslovakia in 1968. Growing up in a highly musical family, Pete discovered his love for music early. At six, he purchased his first album, "The Who – Live at Leeds" and began learning his first chords from his dad, a former guitarist in a Czech underground band. Pete soon moved on to the bass guitar. At the age of eleven, he founded his own band and played his first concerts.

== Musical style ==
Pete Lynch has been compared to the young Peter Gabriel and his musical style is considered alternative rock. He plays many of the instruments featured on his recordings himself.

== Discography ==
Albums

- Face Me!, 2011
- Kill the Monster, 2017

== External link ==
- www.petelynchmusic.com
