= Football Lads Alliance =

British far-right-wing movement

- Formation: 4 June 2017; 9 years ago
- Founder: Dan Harrison
- Dissolved: 22 January 2019; 7 years ago
- Type: Campaign group
- Purpose: Far-right politics; Anti-islamism
- Headquarters: London, UK
- Key people: John Meighan (Leader until 16 April 2018)
- Website: footballladsalliance.co.uk (Archive)

The Football Lads Alliance (FLA) is a far-right movement in the United Kingdom founded by John Meighan in 2017. According to The Times, "the movement was set up as a self-proclaimed 'anti-extremist' movement" but has increasingly become associated with far-right politics and far-right activists, and has been described as a part of the counter-jihad movement. The FLA subsequently split, leading some senior activists to set up the Democratic Football Lads Alliance (DFLA).

The Premier League has warned clubs that "the group is using fans and stadiums to push an anti-Muslim agenda". Concern has also been expressed that the Alliance is "giving cover to the far right" and "uses a secret Facebook page full of violent, racist and misogynistic posts".

== Formation and early activities ==
Following a number of terror attacks in the UK, including the Westminster Bridge attack (22 March 2017) and the bombing of Manchester Arena (22 May 2017), in June 2017 a group of Tottenham Hotspur (Spurs) supporters led by FLA's founder John Meighan initially organised a march in London that purported to be against "extremism".

The FLA was registered as a private company in August 2017. A store was opened online selling t-shirts, hoodies and caps.

The second FLA march in October 2017 featured members of "Veterans Against Terrorism" (VAT), an advocacy group made up of claimed military veterans which opposes what it describes as "Islamist extremists". The Institute for Strategic Dialogue (ISD) monitored the FLA's social media posts as part of their ongoing research into extremist movements and tactics online. It reported that, in less than a year, the FLA had moved to the right.

FLA organized a campaign selling pin badges featuring the poppy symbol of The Royal British Legion donating sums collected to the Legion. The charity however returned a £1,104 donation to the FLA on 11 April 2018 saying that, "a small number of FLA supporters have expressed views and opinions that are not compatible with the values of The Royal British Legion."

FLA founder Meighan stood down on 16 April 2018 saying that the company would be dissolved. It was finally formally dissolved on 22 January 2019.

An FLA march was held on 19 May 2018 to mark the first anniversary of the Manchester Arena bombing with around 200 people attending. An opposition rally was organized with around 800 people, with speakers from anti-racist and anti-fascist movements, local councillors and trade union bodies.

== FLA split and formation of DFLA ==
Logo of the Democratic Football Lads Alliance or the "true" FLA.

When the FLA split, some senior FLA activists set up the DFLA, claiming to represent the "true FLA". It has adopted the slogan "Against All Extremism". The DFLA leader and march organiser is Phillip Hickin.

On 13 October 2018, the DFLA staged a rally in central London which was stopped by anti-fascist protesters, and resulted in violence against the police. Later that week, Premier League club, West Ham United suspended their under-18s coach, Mark Phillips, following his attendance at the DFLA rally. The club said "We have a zero tolerance policy to any form of violent or abusive behaviour. We continue to protect and cherish those values and we remain committed to ensuring that every single member of the West Ham family feels safe, respected and included."

An anti-Brexit rally in London on 7 September 2019 was disrupted by pro-Brexit demonstrators organized by the DFLA.
