= Manvers =

Suburb of Wath upon Dearne in South Yorkshire, England

Coordinates: 53.5022°N 1.3402°W

- Location within South Yorkshire
- OS grid reference: SE438008
- Metropolitan borough: Rotherham
- Metropolitan county: South Yorkshire
- Region: Yorkshire and the Humber
- Country: England
- Sovereign state: United Kingdom
- Post town: Rotherham
- Postcode district: S63
- Dialling code: 01709
- Police: South Yorkshire
- Fire: South Yorkshire
- Ambulance: Yorkshire
- UK Parliament: Wentworth and Dearne

Manvers is a suburb of Wath upon Dearne in the Metropolitan Borough of Rotherham in South Yorkshire, England. It lies across the border with the Metropolitan Borough of Doncaster, whilst Mexborough is part of Doncaster. It is situated between Mexborough and Wath upon Dearne, not far from Swinton.

It is served by Stagecoach Yorkshire, the main route being 220 (Cortonwood/Doncaster Frenchgate), as well as First South Yorkshire and Yorkshire Tiger.

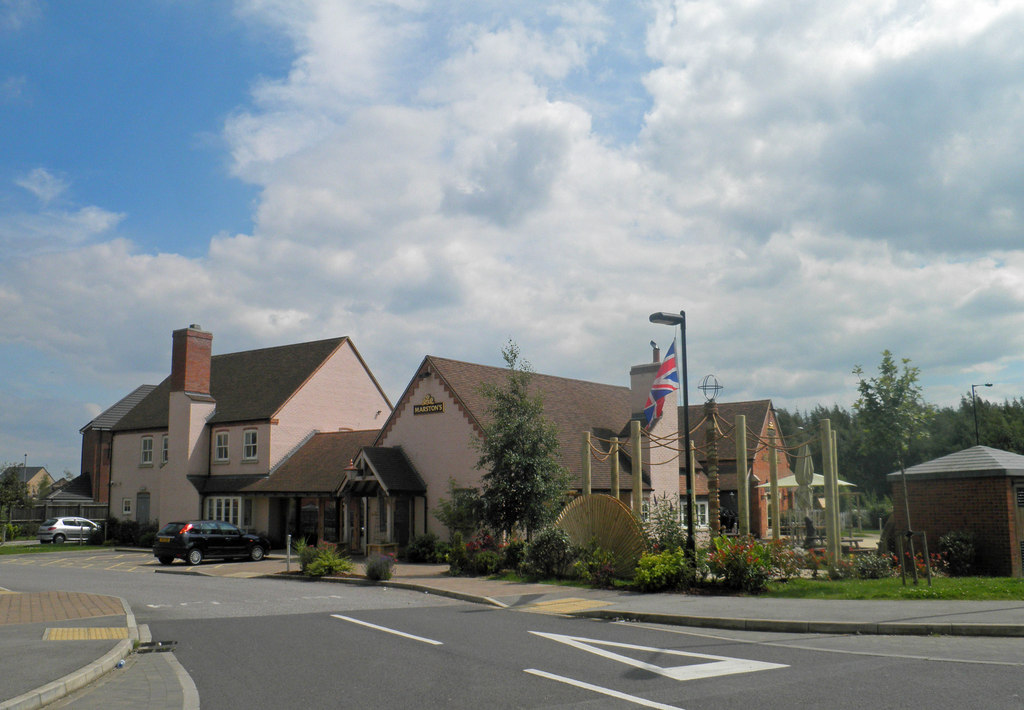
Bluebell public house
