= Doncaster–Swinton line =

Railway line in South Yorkshire, England

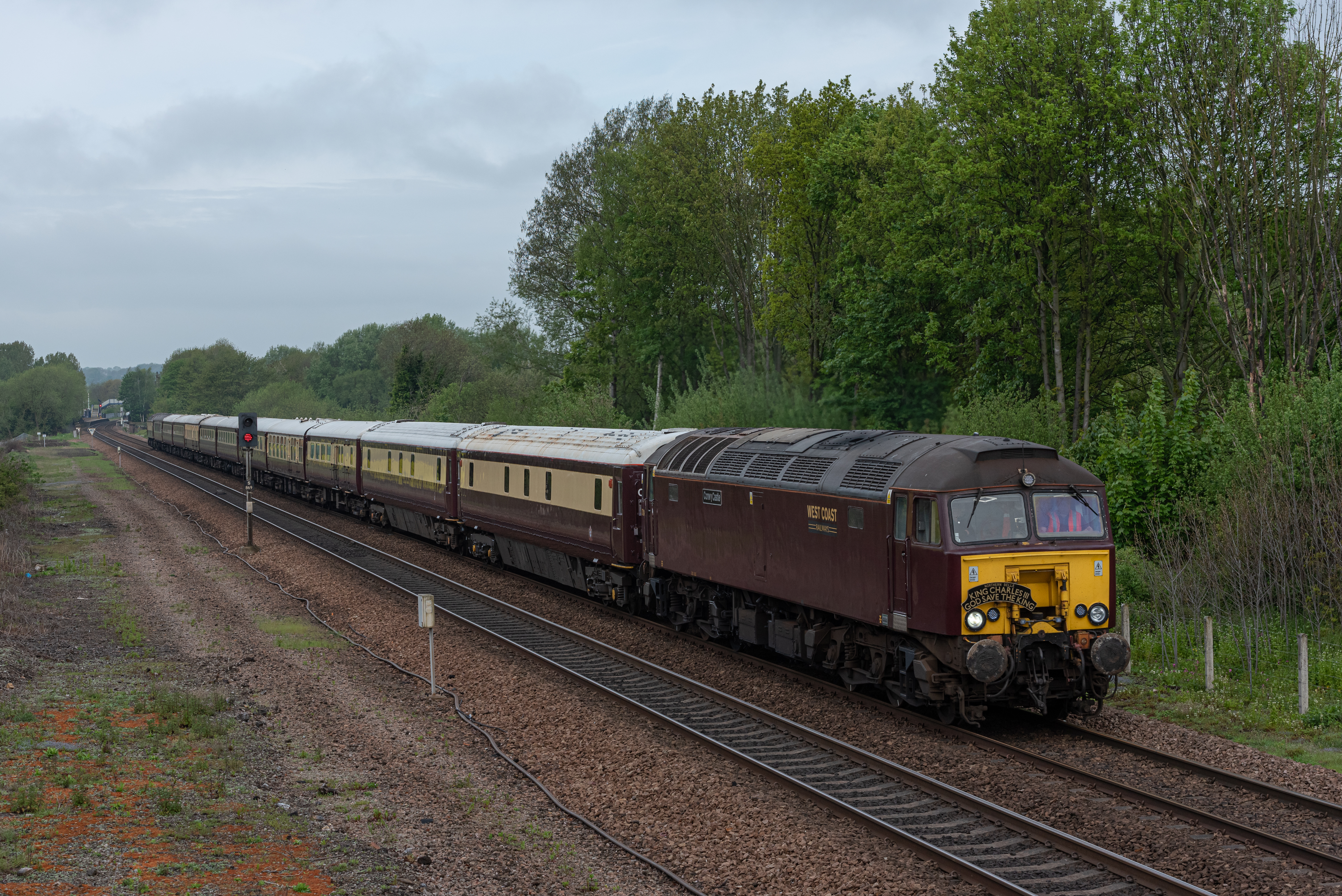
- A heritage service between Mexborough, visible in the background, and Doncaster.

Overview
- Status: Operational
- Owner: Network Rail
- Locale: South Yorkshire
- Termini: Doncaster; Swinton
- Stations: 4

Service
- Type: Heavy rail
- System: National Rail
- Operator(s): Northern Trains

Technical
- Track gauge: 4 ft 8 1/2 in (1,435 mm) standard gauge
Route map
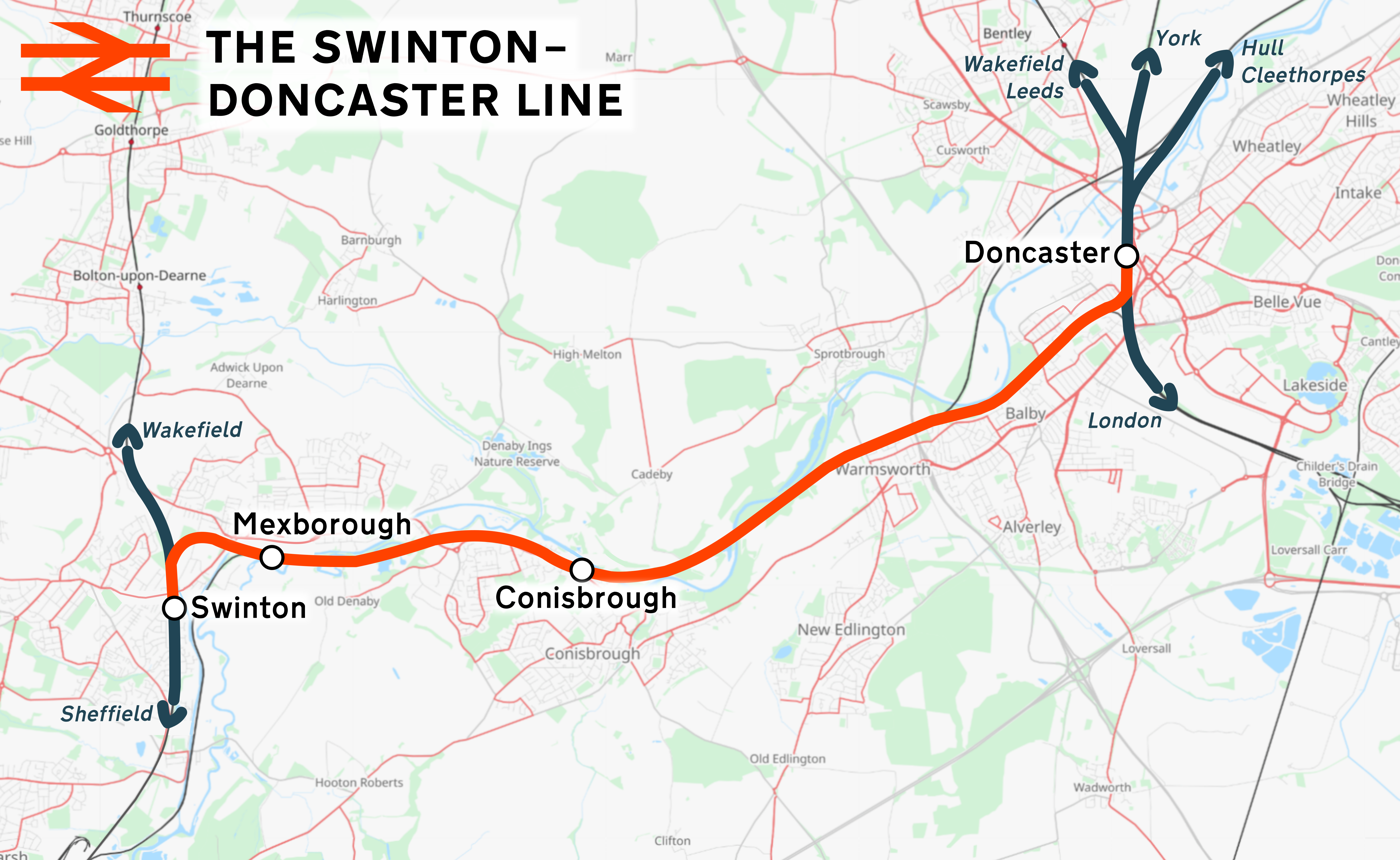
(Click to expand)

The Doncaster–Swinton line is a short railway line in South Yorkshire between Swinton Junction on the Wakefield line and Dearne Valley line and Doncaster South Yorkshire Junction on the East Coast Main Line. The line serves the intermediate stations of Mexborough and Conisbrough, and is used by stopping Northern Trains services as well as non-stopping TransPennine Express and CrossCountry services.

The line was originally opened in 1849 by the South Yorkshire Railway, but was operated by the Midland Railway. At its opening it had three stations, Swinton, Conisbrough, and Doncaster. A chord, called the Swinton Curve, was added that connected the line to the Midland Railway in Swinton in 1872, allowing through services from Sheffield to Doncaster. The line saw significant decline in the early- and mid-1900s, with Sprotbrough station, Swinton Central station, and the Swinton Curve all being closed, and a half-hourly stopping service between Doncaster and Mexborough being the only service.

In the 1980s and 1990s the Swinton Curve was reopened, a new station at Swinton built, and Mexborough station refurbished. This allowed through trains to use the Sheffield–Doncaster link again and stopping trains to travel further as well. Mexborough station was the recipient of further upgrade works in the 2000s.

== History ==
=== Origins ===
The line was originally owned by the South Yorkshire Railway (SYR). Work on the line had begun by October 1847, with construction ceremoniously beginning at Warmsworth Field. Work ran overtime but the line was ready for a trial run to take place on 29 October 1849 when a special train left Doncaster, Cherry Tree Lane station located on the triangle junction with the Great Northern Railway (GNR), southwest of Doncaster. The train, made up of two first class carriages loaned by the Midland Railway (MR) and a GNR open wagon fitted with seats, was propelled by a four-coupled tank locomotive which had been used for ballasting the line. The Board of Trade inspector, Captain George Wynne, inspected the line on 31 October 1849 and reported it as safe for use, but noted deviations from the permitted line.

The date of opening was set for 3 November 1849 but was affected by delays; the line instead opened on 10 November 1850. The passenger service, which ran from Sheffield, was operated by the Midland Railway and was timed to connect with their trains from the North, Derby, Birmingham, Gloucester, Bristol and London. The MR worked the line with its engines and carriages in exchange for one quarter of the receipts. At the opening the only intermediate station was Conisbrough, which was built with two sets of staff and station buildings, one for the SYR owners and one for the MR operators.

Two stations, Mexborough Junction and Mexborough Ferry Boat, were opened in Mexborough, the former in January 1850. Sprotbrough station was also opened during the same year. Both of the Mexborough stations then closed on 4 March 1871 in order to facilitate the new station in the town. On 13 March that year, a connection was made in Swinton to the line originally built by the North Midland Railway, forming a direct link between Sheffield and Doncaster; passenger services began on 3 April. The first Swinton station on the line was opened by the SYR in April 1872.

Spotborough station closed on 1 January 1875. The old station buildings were used by platelayers until the 1950s. A second station in Sprotbrough, on a different site, opened on 1 December 1894, and closed to passengers on 1 February 1903. The first Swinton station was closed on 15 September 1958, by which time it had been renamed to Swinton Central. After the closure of the Swinton Curve, the line was only served by half-hourly services to Mexborough.

=== Closure and reopening ===
The line was not affected by the Beeching Cuts. In the 1980s the South Yorkshire Passenger Transport Authority identified that Swinton, Wath-upon-Dearne, and Kilnhurst all lacked a station. In response, they rebuilt the so-called "Swinton Curve" that connected the MR to the SYR just north of the former Swinton Town railway station. A new station at Swinton, just south of Swinton Town, was built and opened in May 1990, alongside services resuming on the line in the same year. The station was later expanded with permanent buildings. Mexborough's ticket office and waiting area were upgraded, finishing in May 1989. In 2009–10, Mexborough was upgraded with new facilities such as refurbished toilets and new information screens to improve disabled access and overall quality.

== Services ==
As of March 2026, Northern Trains provide stopping services which call at all four stations on the line; CrossCountry and TransPennine Express use the line for non-stopping services whose nearest stations are Meadowhall and Doncaster. Freight services also use the line towards Doncaster.

== See also ==
- North Midland Railway
- South Yorkshire Railway
