= Listed buildings in Mexborough =

Mexborough is a town and a ward in the metropolitan borough of Doncaster, South Yorkshire, England. The ward contains two listed buildings that are recorded in the National Heritage List for England. Of these, one is listed at Grade I, the highest of the three grades, and the other is at Grade II, the lowest grade. The listed buildings consist of a church and a free-standing carved arch.

== Key ==
Grade	Criteria
I	Particularly important buildings of more than special interest
II	Buildings of national importance and special interest

== Buildings ==
Name and location	Photograph	Date	Notes	Grade
St John's Church; 53.49222°N 1.27832°W		12th century	The church has been extended and altered through the centuries, and in 1890–91 it was restored, an aisle was rebuilt, and an apse added. The church is built in sandstone with roofs of lead and copper, and it consists of a nave with a clerestory, north and south aisles, a south porch, a chancel with a polygonal apse, and a west tower with a lean-to south vestry. The tower has diagonal buttresses, a two-light west window, slit windows, and two-light bell openings. Above these is a corbelled band with gargoyles, a parapet, and a recessed octagonal spire. Along the body of the church are embattled parapets.	I
Glassby Arch; 53.49250°N 1.28075°W		1859	A free-standing arch in Romanesque style carved by a local sculptor, Robert Glassby, and moved to its present site in the grounds of almshouses in 2015. It is in stone, and consists of a round arch with a triangular superstructure. There are engaged piers carrying the arch, which has rows of decorated motifs, including chevrons, crosses and beak-heads, and a row of gargoyles including a skull at the centre. Above these is a knight's head and a carved panel, and on the apex is a Celtic cross. There are more gargoyles at the rear and on the outsides of the abutments.	II

== Notes ==
For Mexborough railway station, see Listed buildings in Conisbrough and Denaby
