= T. F. Griffin =

English poet

T. F. Griffin (1949 - 2016) was an English poet born in Richmond, Surrey. He lived in Yorkshire, chiefly in Hull, York and Leeds, since 1969. After teaching and working in various casual capacities, he opened and ran a bookshop and was closely involved since the outset with the long series of poetry readings and publishing projects mounted by the Flux Gallery Press in Leeds.

== His works ==
Griffin's verse attracted notice along with work from Sean O'Brien, Tony Flynn, Peter Didsbury, Douglas Houston and others in Douglas Dunn's 1982 anthology A Rumoured City: New Poets from Hull. At this time, Griffin had already begun publishing poems in national periodicals following a recommendation made privately by Philip Larkin (see Selected Letters, ed. Anthony Thwaite, 1992). He was also receiving support and help with publication from Ted Hughes. His poetry is characterised by the uncompromising lyricism and imaginative energy with which its engages its social and personal concerns. Born Into An Unquiet (ed. Ian Parks) is a festschrift published to mark Griffin's sixtieth birthday. His work also features in Old City, New Rumours: A Hull Anthology (eds. Carol Rumens and Ian Gregson), a sequel to Dunn's 1982 anthology and Versions of the North: A Yorkshire Anthology (ed. Ian Parks).Tricycle Songs, a sequence of nine poems was published in 2013 and Moving from the South, his collected poems containing much hitherto unpublished material, appeared in 2014.

Griffin read his work widely across the country including Ilkley Literature Festival (with Ken Smith), Hull Literature Festival (with Peter Didsbury and Andrew Motion), The Poetry Society in London and venues in Lincoln, Doncaster, Nottingham, Manchester, York, Leeds et al. Before his death Griffin was contributing to a projected work by Jules Smith on the Hull Poets, provisionally entitled Librarians and Barbarians.

=== Opinions of his works ===
'I am so glad that you felt able to take one of Griffin's poems. "The Pursuer" is the one I should have chosen – he seemed well up to publishing standards – he did seem to show an understanding of how a poem should be organised.' Philip Larkin

'Read these poems. It is worth attending to the craft and passion which made them, and they say things of which poetry is in need.' Douglas Dunn

'...if the Selected Poems opens with a gesture to the post-modern void, it is in a post-romantic reaching towards the ineffable and man's spiritual relationship with the ineffable that Griffin stakes his claim to be a unique voice in contemporary poetry.' Ian Pople

'...the hurt ones include those who inhabit the "cider days" of the book's title..the lives of whose victims are recorded with a spare yet somehow soaring compassion.' Peter Didsbury

The publication of this long-awaited second collection (Kavita) confirms Griffin's status as a major talent...' Ian Parks

'Griffin is more delicate (than the others); some of the poems, particularly the love poems, seem perched to take off into ecstasy.' Herbert Lomas

'There's a transcendent clarity and uniqueness to Griffin's voice and verse. His poems created a dimension to which I had not been admitted before, a place of clear reason, compassion and luminous clarity. He never puts a foot wrong rhythmically. I can't think of any collection I've read recently that has such a consistent overall effect.' Douglas Houston

'Despite the variety of tones in Kavita, one is left with a collection that feels intimate, familiar and unified.' Glyn Pursglove

== Publications ==
- The Owl (N.T. Poetry Pamphlets, University of Hull, 1974)
- Bread and Crowds – Foreword by Douglas Dunn, (Outrigger, 1975)
- A Rumoured City – New Poets from Hull, ed. Douglas Dunn, Foreword by Philip Larkin Bloodaxe Books, 1982)
- Cider Days (Headland, 1990)
- The Swifts (Carnivorous Arpeggio Press, Hull, 1994)
- The Quest (Attic Rooms, 1999)
- Selected Poems C.D. (Attic Rooms, 1999)
- Kavita (Shoestring Press, 2003)
- The Great Refusal, ed. T. F. Griffin (Flux Gallery Press, 2005)
- The Leveller (Flux Gallery Press, 2006)
- The Awakening – Selected Poems 1974-2008 (Flux Gallery Press, 2008)
- Born into an Unquiet – T. F. Griffin at Sixty, ed. Ian Parks (Flux Gallery Press, 2010)
- The Awakening – C.D. (Flux Gallery Press, 2010)
- Old City, New Rumours, eds. Ian Gregson and Carol Rumens (Five Leaves Publications, 2010)
- Versions of the North, ed. Ian Parks (Five Leaves Publications, 2013)
- Tricycle Songs (Flux Gallery Press, 2013)
- Moving from The South - Collected Poems 1970-2014 (Flux Gallery Press, 2014)
