= Vic Doddsworth =

English footballer

Personal information
- Full name: Victor Edward Doddsworth
- Date of birth: 2 October 1911
- Place of birth: Mexborough, England
- Date of death: 1986 (aged 74–75)
- Height: 6 ft 1 in (1.85 m)
- Position: Wing half

Senior career*
Years	Team	Apps	(Gls)
1930–1931	Gainsborough Trinity		
1931–1935	Grimsby Town	4	(1)
1935–1936	Manchester United	0	(0)
1936–1937	Doncaster Rovers	16	(0)
1937–193?	Grimsby Borough Police		
- * Club domestic league appearances and goals

Victor Edward Doddsworth (2 October 1911 – 1986) was an English professional footballer who played as a wing half.
