= Thrybergh Tins railway station =

Former railway station in England

Thrybergh Tins

General information
- Location: Thrybergh, Rotherham; England
- Coordinates: 53.44751°N 1.30501°W
- Grid reference: SK462947
- Platforms: 1

Other information
- Status: Disused

History
- Original company: British Railways

Key dates
- 1959: opened
- 1968: closed
Location

Thrybergh Tins platform was a short platform built alongside the Great Central and Midland Joint Railway line between Thrybergh Junction, on the Great Central Railway, Mexborough to Rotherham Central line and Silverwood Colliery, near Thrybergh. A connection was also available to the Midland Railway near Parkgate and Rawmarsh. This line never carried any timetabled passenger service. The operation of the line came under the jurisdiction of the station master at Kilnhurst Central.

In 1959 at the request of the local Working Men's Clubs at Thrybergh a short platform, about 75 feet (23 m) in length, was built near the Park Lane bridge on the G.C.& M.J.R. Silverwood line to serve the "Children's Outings" - seaside day trips for members and their children which were a regular feature in the clubland calendar. The platform was known as "Thrybergh Tins", but it never had a name board to that effect.

The first train to use the platform ran on 17 June 1959 taking over 1300 people from Silverwood Miners' Welfare Club to Bridlington. The platform was used on 3 or 4 occasions each year. It did not appear in the railway timetables, the trains which used the platform were shown in "Special Traffic Notices". The last trains to use the platform did so in the mid-1960s when it effectively closed around 1968 although it remained in situ until early 1972.
