= Doncaster Radio =

Independent Local Radio radio station in Doncaster and Bassetlaw

Coordinates: 53.4952°N 1.2846°W

- Doncaster; England
- Broadcast area: Doncaster and Bassetlaw
- Frequencies: DAB: 8A (Doncaster)

Programming
- Format: Adult contemporary

Ownership
- Owner: Chris Holden
- Sister stations: Rotherham Radio

History
- First air date: 14 September 2020

Links
- Webcast: Doncaster Radio Player
- Website: Doncaster Radio

Doncaster Radio, formerly known as TX1 Radio, is an Independent Local Radio station broadcasting to the Doncaster and Bassetlaw districts of South Yorkshire and Nottinghamshire, England. It launched on 14 September 2020 following the re-branding of Trax FM and other stations as Greatest Hits Radio. It has a sister station, Rotherham Radio.

== Transmission ==
The station can be received online via webcast.

From 10 June 2021 until November 2022, the station was also broadcast on the Lincolnshire DAB radio multiplex, ensuring fortuitous coverage into distant towns such as Boston, Grantham and Scarborough, and even parts of Cambridgeshire and Leicestershire. Despite this, reception may be poor in western parts of the broadcast area such as Conisbrough and Mexborough. Digital radio transmitters are located at Belmont near Market Rasen, Lincoln, Grantham Barracks and High Hunsley near Beverley.

The station has expressed demand or support in the forthcoming small-scale DAB multiplex for Doncaster in the sole application for the licence.

== Schedule ==
Weekdays:

- Bruce Edwards (7am-10am)
- Mike Nicholson (10am-2pm)
- Darren Spence (2pm-4pm)
- Stewart Nicholson (4pm-7pm)
- John McDonald (7pm-10pm)

Saturdays:

- Leighton Morris (7am-10am)
- Wes Stakes (10am-2pm)
- Chris Marsden (2pm-5pm)
- Chris Birks (5pm-9pm)
- Stewart Nicholson (9pm-11pm)

Sundays:

- Leighton Morris (7am-10am)
- Bruce Edwards (10am-2pm)
- Stu White (2pm-5pm)
- Jemma Hall (5pm-7pm)
- The Album Show with Bruce Edwards (7pm-8pm)
- Clare Elise (8pm-10pm)
