= Old Market Hall =

Old Market Hall may refer to:

- Old Market Hall, Blaenau Ffestiniog
- Old Market Hall, Helsinki
- Old Market Hall, Llanidloes
- Old Market Hall, Mexborough, a pub in England
- Old Market Hall, Shrewsbury
- Old Market Hall, Tenby
