= Conisbrough Viaduct =

Former railway viaduct in South Yorkshire, England

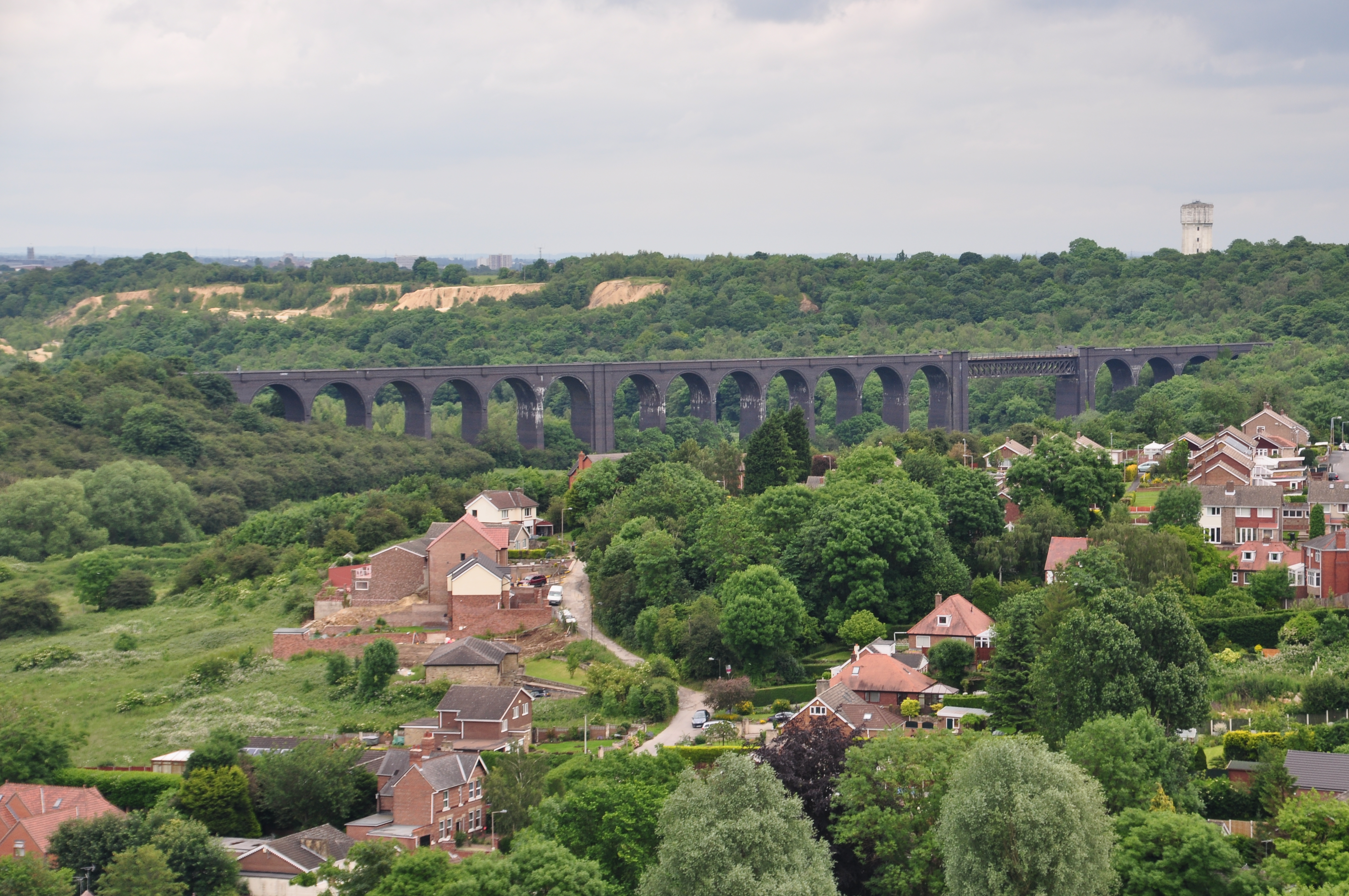
- Conisbrough Viaduct looking eastwards
- Coordinates: 53.488°N 1.210°W
- OS grid reference: SK524993
- Carries: Public path
- Crosses: River Don
- Locale: Conisbrough, South Yorkshire, England

Characteristics
- Material: Red brick
- Trough construction: Blue brick
- Pier construction: Steel
- Total length: 1,527 feet (465 m)
- Height: 113–116 feet (34–35 m) (Note: Sources differ on the actual height above the river.)
- No. of spans: 22 (21 arches)

Rail characteristics
- No. of tracks: 1
- Track gauge: 4 ft 8 1/2 in (1,435 mm) standard gauge

History
- Fabrication by: Gates & Hogg
- Construction start: 1906
- Construction end: 1909
- Construction cost: £4,919 (1906)
- Opened: 17 March 1909
- Closed: 31 July 1966

Statistics
- Daily traffic: Heavy rail

Listed Building – Grade II
- Designated: 1 July 2021
- Reference no.: 1475175

Location
- Interactive map of Conisbrough Viaduct

Conisbrough Viaduct is a former railway viaduct, near to Cadeby and Conisbrough in South Yorkshire, England. The viaduct consists of two sections of brick and stone on each bank, connected by a lattice girder section, some 113–116 feet (34–35 m) over the River Don. The height and space were required should shipping need to navigate along the river. The viaduct carried the Dearne Valley Railway over the River Don between 1909 and 1966, after closure it was converted into a foot and cycle path. The structure is grade II listed, and is notable for being one of the first bridges in Britain to be built using a rope system above the viaduct known as a "Blondin".

The viaduct was 4.5 miles (7.2 km) west of Edlington Halt, and 17 miles (27 km) south of Crofton Junction.

== History ==
The viaduct connected the Dearne Valley Railway and its associated collieries with Black Carr and Doncaster in the south. The act of Parliament was approved: the Dearne Valley Railway Act 1897 (60 & 61 Vict. c. ccxlii). The railway opened in stages, from 1902 onwards, with the final section of trackwork being completed in October 1908, although the viaduct took longer, and was finished in March 1909. The full length of the line was 22 miles (35 km), with the viaduct being 1-mile (1.6 km) west of Edlington Halt, and 17 miles (27 km) south of Crofton Junction (the northern end). A passenger service operated as far as Edlington Halt on the south bank of the River Don between June 1912 and September 1951. Although the viaduct was built to carry two standard gauge lines, only one was laid across the structure which swapped sides along the viaduct, putting "an unusual kink" in the running line.

The viaduct consists of 21 brick arches, each measuring 55 feet (17 m) in width, and a single span of Warren truss lattice girder work of 150 feet (46 m) which straddles the River Don. There are 14 arches on the western side (also known as the "Cadeby Bank"), and seven on the eastern side (also known as the "Conisbrough Bank"), which differ between 40 feet (12 m) to 150 feet (46 m) in height. The viaduct is 1,527 feet (465 m) long, and made with over 12 million bricks, standing some 113–116 feet (34–35 m) above the river; which led to one reviewer to describe the viaduct as a "truly Goliath structure". Each pier is tapered at the bottom, with the foundations sunk into grey shale in the ground. Subsidence was avoided by the contractors purchasing the minerals rights to the land underneath the viaduct, so the coal measures in the vicinity were never worked. Double buttresses with projecting bedstones, were built at either end of the lattice span to help support it.

The viaduct was constructed using an aerial ropeway suspended over the course of the works. The ropeway, known as a "Blondin", was held up by a tower at each end at a height of 80 feet (24 m), being 1,875 feet (572 m) in length, and at its lowest point, it was 150 feet (46 m) above ground level. The section of track including the viaducts' construction, was the responsibility of Gates & Hogg. Timber used in the construction of the supporting frame, came from those used in the building of the High Level Bridge in Newcastle. After Conisbrough Viaduct was built the timbers, and the Blondin, were re-used for the construction of Leighton Reservoir in North Yorkshire.

The viaduct was built at 150 feet (46 m) above the river in case Sheffield was to be turned into an inland port. The experiences of building the Manchester Ship Canal led to a review of bridge building over waterways at the turn of the 20th century. The main brick used on the viaduct was red brick, but Staffordshire blue bricks were used to face the bridge. The central lattice girder span was engineered by John Butler at the Stanningley ironworks near Leeds. The tender for building the viaduct was awarded in 1906 and cost £4,919 (equivalent to £523,000 in 2025).

== Closure and re-use ==
Cycle path on the viaduct top

The passenger service across the viaduct was withdrawn in September 1951 but the line over the viaduct remained open for freight until 1966. Whilst the collieries that the line served were still open, subsidence at the viaduct prompted its abandonment, and a new junction was built at the northern end of the line to allow traffic to operate from the northern end only. In April 1985, the disused viaduct was transferred to the British Railways Board (Residuary), and in 2010, Sustrans tarmacked the viaduct as part of the route becoming a long-distance walking and cycling path. The presence of dwarf elder trees in the brickwork led to the possibility of the viaduct being demolished in the 1980s.

In 2015, the viaduct was the setting for a murder scene in the TV series DCI Banks.

== See also ==
- Listed buildings in Conisbrough and Denaby
