= Rotherham Radio =

Radio station in Rotherham and Sheffield, England

- Rotherham; United Kingdom
- Broadcast area: Rotherham and Sheffield
- Frequency: DAB: 9C

Programming
- Format: Adult contemporary

Ownership
- Owner: Chris Holden
- Sister stations: Doncaster Radio

History
- First air date: 14 September 2020
- Former names: RB1 Radio (2020–2023)

Links
- Webcast: Rotherham Radio Player
- Website: Rotherham Radio

Rotherham Radio, formerly known as RB1 Radio, is an Independent Local Radio station broadcasting to the Rotherham and Sheffield districts of South Yorkshire, England. It launched in September 2020 and rebranded to its current name on 6 March 2023. It has a sister station, Doncaster Radio. Both stations are broadcast from studios at Mexborough Business Centre.

== Transmission ==
The station can be received online via webcast.

The station has expressed demand or support in the forthcoming small-scale DAB multiplex for Doncaster in the sole application for the licence.
