= A6023 road =

Primary route 'A' road in South Yorkshire, England

A6023

Route information
- Length: 5.5 mi (8.9 km)

Major junctions
- East end: Conisbrough
- West end: Wath-upon-Dearne

Location
- Country: United Kingdom

Road network
- Roads in the United Kingdom; Motorways; A and B road zones

The A6023 road runs for 5.5 miles (8.9 km) from Conisbrough to Wath-upon-Dearne via Mexborough and Denaby Main. In the east, it starts at, and passes Conisbrough Castle.

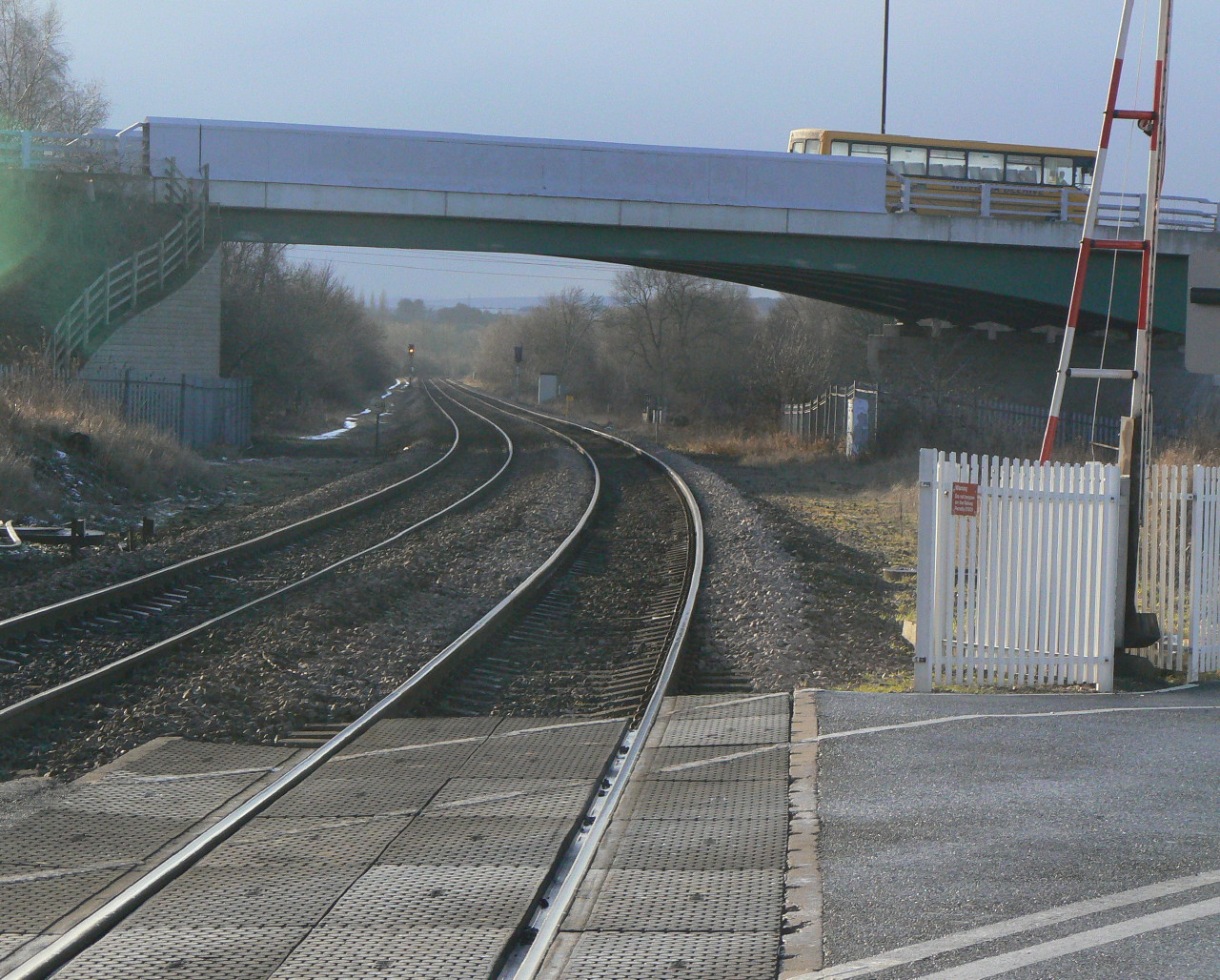
Crossing and bridge at Denaby

A short section of the road over the railway line between Doncaster and Sheffield was bypassed in 2002. The bypass was projected to cost £5 million, and had been planned for some time. The diversion meant building a bridge to the west of the level crossing over the railway and adjacent River Don. The western end of the road which runs through Manvers Way Business Park, is built on the old formation of the railway lines serving the Midland Railway's station at Wath, and the Manvers coal and coke complex.

Between 2004 and 2017, the road was average between 11,000 and 12,000 vehicles per year. In 2018, it was revealed that the road may be diverted in the Mexborough area due to work on HS2 between Birmingham and Leeds, although final details have not yet been released.

== Settlements ==
- Conisbrough
- Denaby
- Mexborough
- Wath-upon-Dearne
