= Swinton Central railway station =

Disused railway station in South Yorkshire, England

Swinton Central
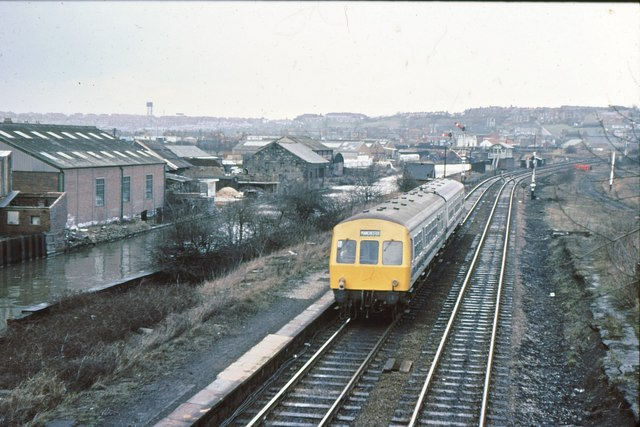

General information
- Location: Swinton, Rotherham; England
- Coordinates: 53.488525°N 1.298790°W
- Grid reference: SK466993
- Platforms: 2

Other information
- Status: Disused

History
- Original company: South Yorkshire Railway
- Pre-grouping: Manchester, Sheffield and Lincolnshire Railway; Great Central Railway
- Post-grouping: LNER; Eastern Region of British Railways

Key dates
- April 1872: Opened
- 15 September 1958: Closed
Location

Swinton, later Swinton Central railway station was situated on the South Yorkshire Railway line from Sheffield Victoria to Doncaster, between Kilnhurst Central and Mexborough. The station was to serve the community of Swinton Bridge, near Mexborough, South Yorkshire, England.

The station was opened in April 1872, shortly after the through line, and comprised two flanking platforms. The main building, including booking office, porters room etc., was on the Sheffield-bound platform and was a single storey structure with hipped roof. The Doncaster-bound platform had, originally, a wooden waiting shelter which was replaced by a brick-built example in the 1890s. At the south (Kilnhurst) end of the platforms was an occupation crossing which gave access to the platforms. This crossing was unprotected by signals or any form of locking. The line was also crossed by a footbridge at this point with steps, not only to the thoroughfare but to the station platforms.

In 1939, at the outbreak of World War II, a government factory was built on land over this crossing and this had rail connection. With more than local traffic to cross the crossing was altered to manual worked gates released from Mexborough No.3 signal box (at the north end of the station). Unusually the responsibility for manning the gates was with the factory authorities. The factory was bought by "white goods" manufacturer Hotpoint.

Swinton Central was closed on 15 September 1958.

Preceding station	Disused railways	Following station
Kilnhurst Central	Eastern Region of British Railways; Sheffield Victoria-Doncaster Line	Mexborough
