= Mexborough (Ferry Boat) Halt railway station =

Former railway station in South Yorkshire, England

Mexborough (Ferry Boat) Halt
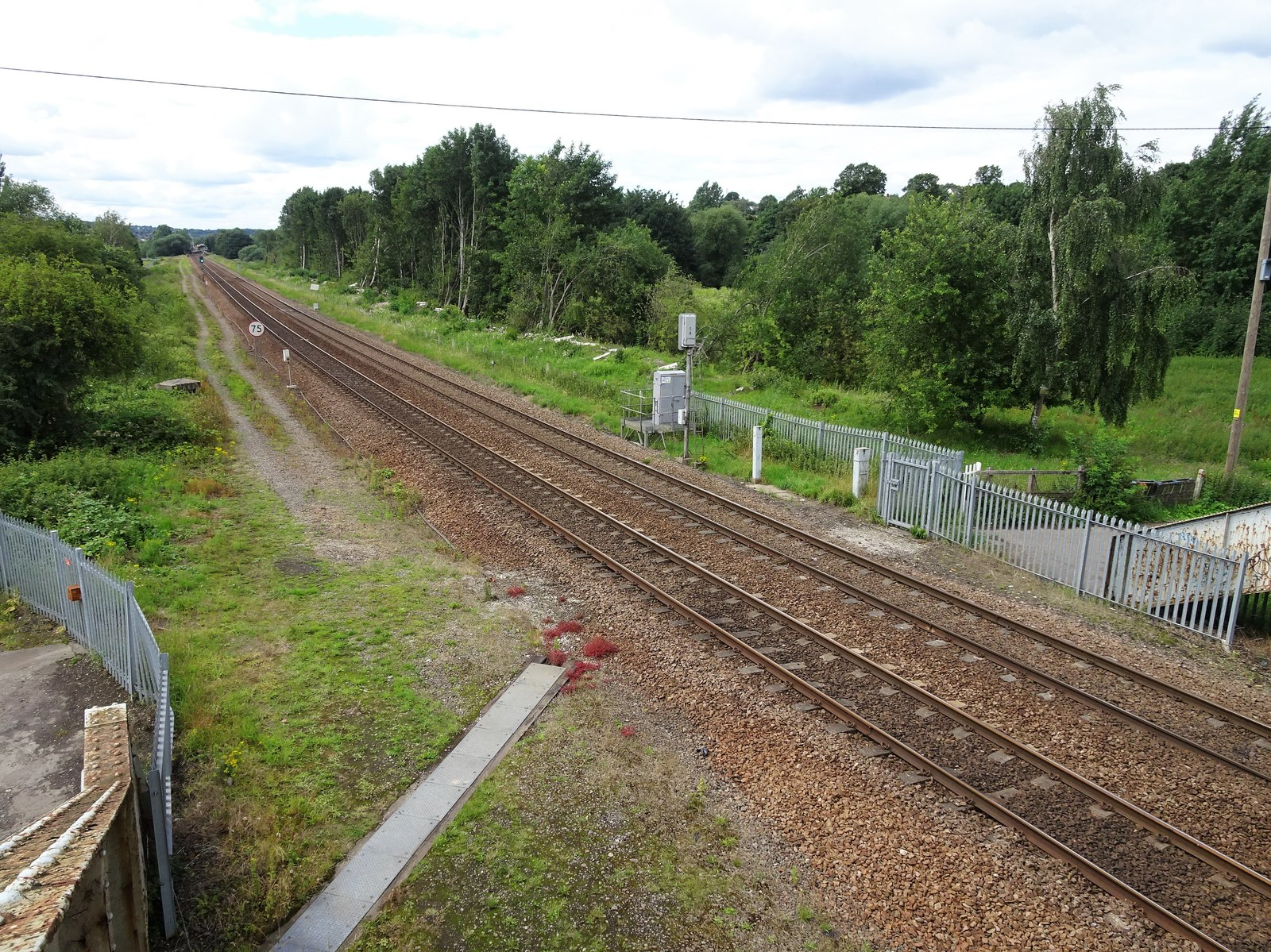
- Station site in July 2020.

General information
- Location: Mexborough, Doncaster; England
- Coordinates: 53.49036°N 1.27599°W
- Grid reference: SK481995

Other information
- Status: Disused

History
- Original company: South Yorkshire Railway

Key dates
- 1850: opened
- 1871: closed
Location

Mexborough (Ferry Boat) Halt was a small railway station on the South Yorkshire Railway's line between Barnsley and Doncaster in South Yorkshire, England. It was intended to serve the township of Mexborough and the village parish of Old Denaby where it was situated, the boundary being the River Don. It was close by the Ferry Boat crossing of the river and the swing bridge over the canal, a short distance from the original centre of Mexborough, around where the parish church now stands.

At this point the line is crossed by a footpath which connects Mexborough to Old Denaby. Access to the platform was from this path. The railway was controlled by a signal box known as "Ferry Boat Crossing".

It is believed that the station closed, along with Mexborough Junction railway station on the opening of the new, present day Mexborough station in 1871.
