= Listed buildings in Conisbrough and Denaby =

Conisbrough is a ward and Denaby is a civil parish in the metropolitan borough of Doncaster, South Yorkshire, England. The ward and parish contain 18 listed buildings that are recorded in the National Heritage List for England. Of these, two are listed at Grade I, the highest of the three grades, and the others are at Grade II, the lowest grade. The listed buildings are in the town of Conisbrough, and the villages of Denaby Main and Old Denaby. The most important buildings are Conisbrough Castle and St Peter's Church, both listed at Grade I. The other listed buildings include houses, a medieval well cover, a set of stocks, a public house, Conisbrough viaduct,a railway station and station house, two mileposts, another church and a chapel, a drinking fountain, and two war memorials.

== Key ==
Grade	Criteria
I	Particularly important buildings of more than special interest
II	Buildings of national importance and special interest

== Buildings ==
Name and location	Photograph	Date	Notes	Grade
St Peter's Church; 53.48305°N 1.22967°W		8th century (probable)	The church was altered and extended through the centuries, it was restored in 1866–67, and the vestry was added in 1913–14. It is built in magnesian limestone with lead roofs, and consists of a nave with a clerestory, north and south aisles, a south porch, a chancel with a north chapel and vestry, and a west tower embraced by the aisles. The tower has angle buttresses, a west doorway with a pointed arch, a statue niche, and clock faces on the north and south sides. At the top is a string course with north and south gargoyles, a traceried frieze, and an embattled parapet with crocketed pinnacles. There are embattled parapets on the nave, aisles and porch.	I
Conisbrough Castle; 53.48442°N 1.22580°W		c. 1120	The remains of the castle are in magnesian limestone. They consist of the keep, and a D-shaped enclosure with the remains of the gatehouse and a barbican. The keep is cylindrical, about 28 metres (92 ft) high, with four storeys, and six full-height buttresses rising as turrets. The third floor contains a chapel with a small vestry.	I
Well cover 53.48354°N 1.23027°W	—	Late medieval	The well cover is in limestone, and is partly buried in the pavement. It has a rectangular plan, and a pitched roof with projecting verges and a moulded ridge. In the south end is a blocked entrance.	II
The Old Hall, Denaby; 53.48615°N 1.27345°W	—	15th century	A medieval house, much altered and divided, it is in sandstone with some brick, partly rendered, with quoins, and tile roofs. There are two storeys and a partilal cellar, the windows are casements, and on the north front is a garderobe turret.	II
Former Old Hall Restaurant; 53.48240°N 1.23051°W		Early to mid 18th century	A house later used for other purposes, it is in magnesian limestone, with rusticated quoins, stone slate eaves courses, and a pantile roof with coped gables and shaped kneelers. There are two storeys, cellars and attics, five bays, and lean-tos on the left and rear. The doorway has an architrave, a frieze with urns and a swag, and a cornice, and the windows are sashes.	II
Set of stocks 53.48329°N 1.22601°W		Late 18th century (probable)	The stocks were resited in Coronation Park in the early 20th century. They consist of a pair of square magnesian limestone posts with rounded tops. The boards are wooden, and contain four holes for legs.	II
The Old Priory Nursing Home and outbuilding 53.48431°N 1.22827°W	—	c. 1800	A vicarage that was later extended and used for other purposes, it is in magnesian limestone with a hipped roof of Welsh slate and pantile. There are two storeys, a front of four bays, and a rear wing continuing as an outbuilding. The middle two bays project under a coped pedimented gable with a blind quatrefoil in the tympanum. In the right bay is a canted bay window, and the other windows are sashes.	II
The Red Lion public house 53.47903°N 1.22845°W		Late 18th to early 19th century	The public house is pebbledashed, and has a roof of Welsh slate and stone slate. There are three storeys, a central block of three bays with a pedimented gable, and lean-to side wings, each with a half-pediment. The central doorway has an architrave, a fanlight, and a cornice. It is flanked by canted bay windows, and the other windows are sashes, those in the wings in round-arched recesses.	II
The Priory; 53.48300°N 1.22852°W	—	Early to mid 19th century	A house later used for other purposes, it is stuccoed, with giant end pilasters, a cornice below a parapet containing balustraded panels, and a hipped Welsh slate roof. There are two storeys, three bays, the middle bay projecting, and a rear wing projecting to the right. Steps lead up to a central doorway that has an archivolt with a keystone, and a modillion cornice. In the outer bays are canted bay windows with modillion cornices, and the other windows are sashes, the window above the doorway in a segmental-arched recess.	II
Mexborough station and station house 53.49096°N 1.28858°W		1871	The station and house were built by the Manchester, Sheffield and Lincolnshire Railway. They are in sandstone with a Welsh slate roof, and consist of a single-storey range containing a parcel office, a ticket office and waiting rooms, and at the east end is a two-storey house. The buildings have a chamfered plinth, quoins, chamfered surrounds to sash windows, an eaves band, and an arcaded loggia. The house and the ticket office each has a bay window, and above is a gable containing a quatrefoil. On the ticket office is a war memorial plaque, and to the right of it is a pedestrian entrance.	II
Milepost, Conisbrough; 53.48926°N 1.23480°W		Late 19th century	The milepost is on the south side of Doncaster Road, and is in stone with cast iron overlay. It has a triangular plan and a rounded top. On the top is inscribed "BRAMPTON BIERLOW & HOOTON" "ROBERTS ROAD" "SWINTON BRANCH" and "CONISBORO", and on the sides are the distances to Doncaster, Conisbrough, Barnsley, Wentworth, Swinton, and Mexborough.	II
Milepost, Denaby Main; 53.49294°N 1.25781°W		Late 19th century	The milepost is on the north side of Doncaster Road, and is in stone with cast iron overlay. It has a triangular plan and a rounded top. On the top is inscribed "BRAMPTON BIERLOW & HOOTON" "ROBERTS ROAD" "SWINTON BRANCH" and "DENABY", and on the sides are the distances to Doncaster, Conisbrough, Barnsley, Wentworth, Swinton, and Mexborough.	II
Wesleyan Methodist Chapel; 53.48078°N 1.22896°W		1876	The chapel is in orange brick with sandstone dressings and a hipped tile roof, and is in Italianate style. The front has two storeys and three bays, the middle bay projecting under a broken triangular pediment, with bands, and pilasters flanking the middle bay and at the corner. In the centre are double round-headed doorways, over which is an inscribed and dated plaque. The upper floor contains a tripartite window with round-headed lights, and above is a semicircular window. The outer bays also contain round-headed windows, and all the openings have keystones.	II
St Alban's Church and presbytery 53.48951°N 1.24450°W		1897–98	The north aisle and chapel were added to the church in 1920. It is built in sandstone with Welsh slate roofs, and consists of a nave and chancel in one unit with a clerestory, a south aisle, a north aisle between gabled projections, and a southwest tower. The tower has corner gargoyles, a coped parapet, and a shingled octagonal spirelet with a heart-shaped finial. A link from the south aisle leads to the presbytery, which is at right angles. The presbytery has two storeys and an attic, and coped gables. Some windows are sashes, and others are mullioned and transomed.	II
Conisbrough Viaduct; 53.48877°N 1.21167°W		1906–07	The viaduct was built by the Dearne Valley Railway to carry its line over the valley of the River Don, and is 482.8 metres (1,584 ft) long. It is in red brick, faced by Staffordshire blue engineering brick, and crossing the river is a lattice girder span, There are 21 round arches, with tapering piers, impost bands, and hood moulds. The parapets are carried on corbel tables and have flat coping stones.	II
Drinking fountain and lamp 53.48287°N 1.22614°W		1911	The drinking fountain and lamp standard are by the southern entrance to Coronation Park, and in cast iron. The base is shaped and octagonal, and contains a narrow dog trough. The main basin is D-shaped with a rounded lip, and in the centre is an octagonal column with a round-arched panel on each face, the front face inscribed and dated. The top of the column is ogee-shaped with fleur-de-lys motifs, and is surmounted by a lamp standard with decorative shell motifs and a ladder bar.	II
Conisbrough War Memorial; 53.48312°N 1.22600°W		c. 1920	The war memorial is in sandstone, and consists of the life-size statue of an infantryman with a rifle standing on a stylised square Doric column. The column is on a plinth of three steps, there is an inscription on the base, and on the faces of the column are bronze plaques with the names of those lost in the First World War.	II
Denaby War Memorial; 53.49230°N 1.24783°W		1930s	The war memorial is in Memorial Park, and it consists of a square sandstone column with a stepped cap surmounted by a stylised lamp. This stands on a square plinth on a platform of three octagonal steps. The faces of the column are incised with a Latin cross design, and on the faces are bronze plaques with inscriptions and the names of those lost in the two World Wars.	II
