= Sprotborough (SYR) railway station =

Disused railway station in South Yorkshire, England

Sprotborough (SYR)
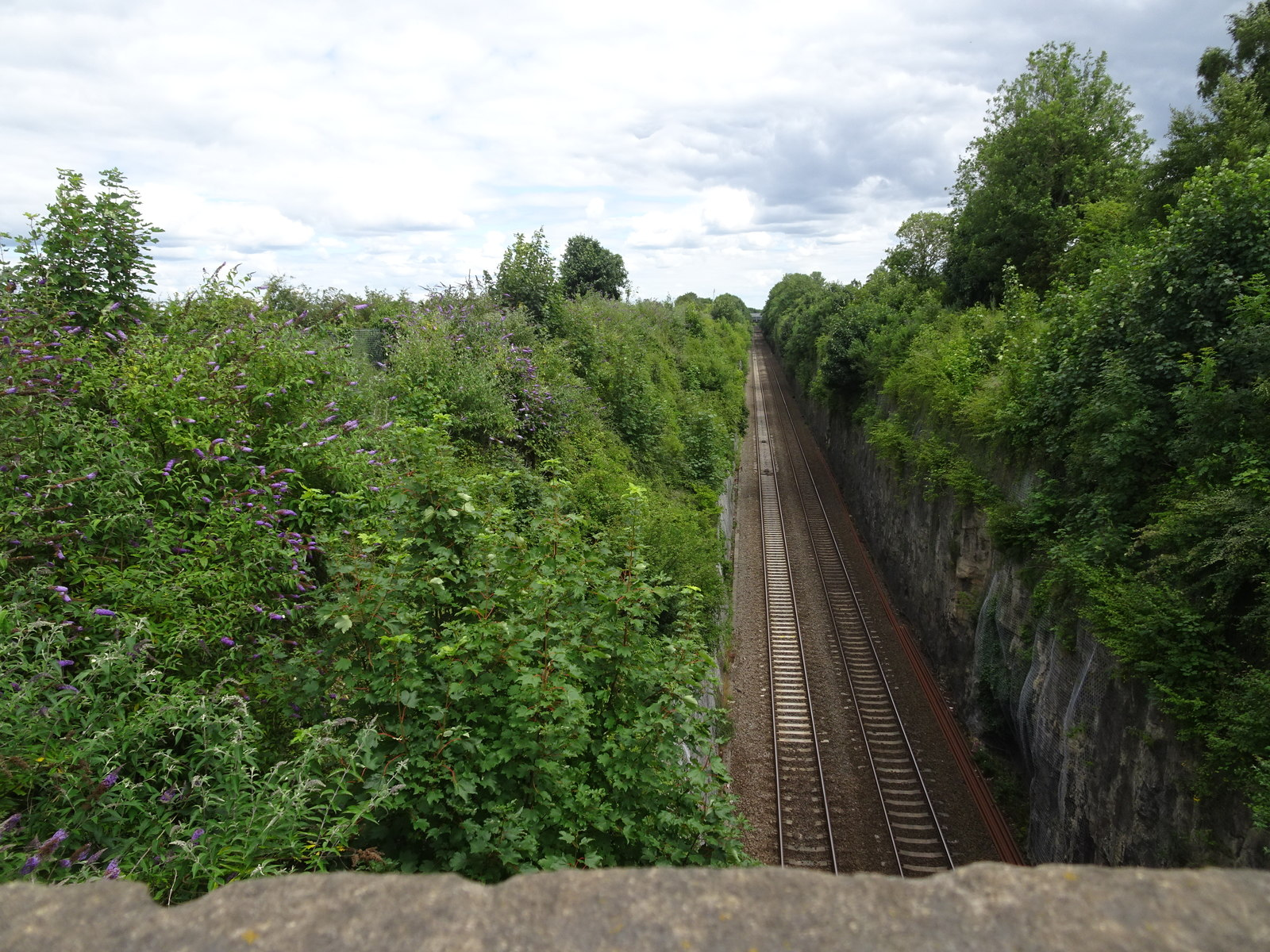
- Station site in July 2020.

General information
- Location: Sprotborough, Doncaster; England
- Coordinates: 53.50226°N 1.18459°W
- Grid reference: SE541009

Other information
- Status: Disused

History
- Original company: South Yorkshire Railway

Key dates
- 1 February 1850: Opened
- 1 January 1875: Closed
Location

Sprotborough (SYR) railway station was situated on the South Yorkshire Railway's line between Doncaster Cherry Tree Lane and Conisbrough. The station was intended to serve both Sprotbrough and Warmsworth, near Doncaster, South Yorkshire, England.

The station was located where the Warmsworth to Sprotbrough road crosses the line over the deep limestone cutting and was approached by a covered flight of 66 steps to the Sheffield-bound platform. The station had two flanking platforms and a small wooden shelter which served as both ticket office and waiting room. Following the closure of the station on 1 January 1875, this structure served as a platelayers hut until the mid-1950s. See also Sprotborough (H&B) railway station.

Worthy of note, the station incorrectly spelled the name of the village with an extra 'o'; the village is spelled Sprotbrough.
