= Kilnhurst Central railway station =

Disused railway station in South Yorkshire, England

Kilnhurst Central
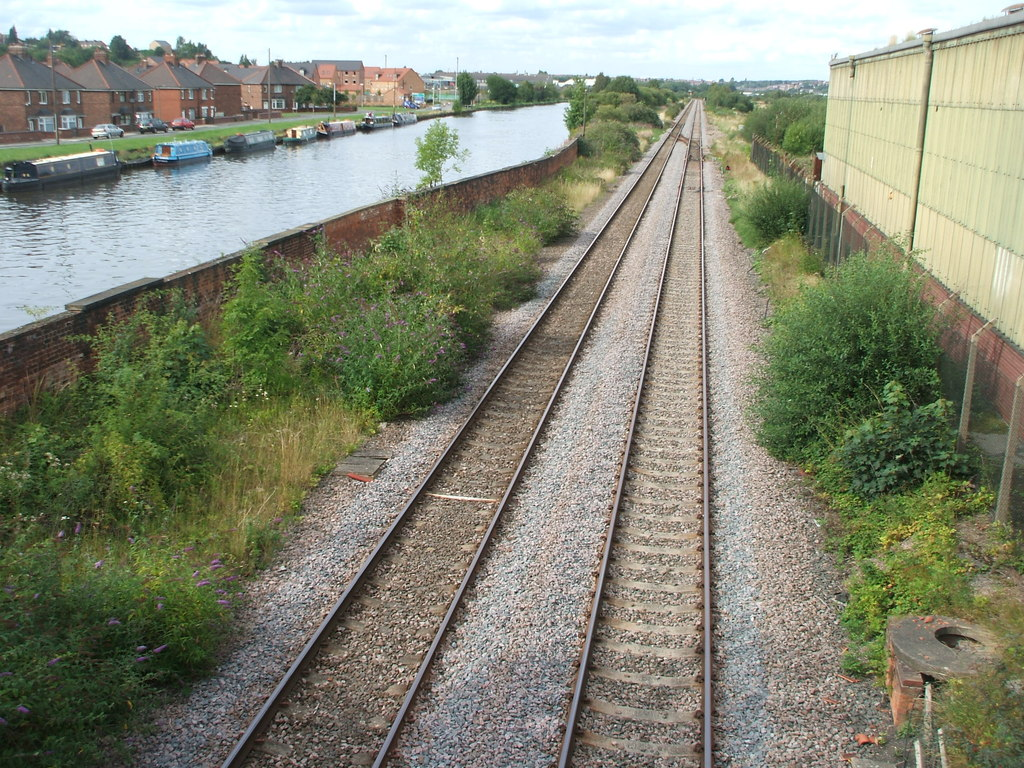
- Site of the former station (2008)

General information
- Location: Kilnhurst, Rotherham; England
- Coordinates: 53.4709°N 1.3024°W
- Grid reference: SK464973
- Platforms: 2

Other information
- Status: Disused

History
- Original company: Manchester, Sheffield and Lincolnshire Railway
- Pre-grouping: Great Central Railway
- Post-grouping: London and North Eastern Railway; Eastern Region of British Railways

Key dates
- September 1871: Opened
- 5 February 1968: Closed
Location

Kilnhurst Central was a railway station in Kilnhurst, South Yorkshire, England, one of two railway stations serving the village, the other being Kilnhurst West, situated on the North Midland Railway line. Kilnhurst Central was on the former Great Central Railway's (GCR) Sheffield Victoria - Doncaster line, between Parkgate and Aldwarke and Swinton Central.

== History ==
A single track line was built by the South Yorkshire Railway (SYR) from Mexborough to Kilnhurst to serve the pottery and brickworks, and later the colliery, this running alongside the South Yorkshire Navigation. It was not until later, after the SYR was integrated into the Manchester, Sheffield and Lincolnshire Railway (MS&L), that this line was joined to their Sheffield (Tinsley Junction) to Rotherham line, with a passenger service introduced between Sheffield Victoria and Doncaster, and intermediate stations built, the first being Rotherham Central in 1864. Kilnhurst (the "Central" was added later) opened in September 1871 and closed on 5 February 1968.

The main building of the station, which housed the booking office, parcels facilities, staff facilities and the stationmasters' house, was on the Sheffield-bound platform and was built in the MS&LR "Double Pavilion" style, one of the earliest examples, whilst the Doncaster-bound platform had to suffice with a plain brick-built waiting shelter. Access to the station, for both passengers and goods, was originally from the Hooton Roberts road, but this was rarely used by passengers in latter years when steps to the road overbridge gave direct access to both platforms. A significant amount of the station including the platforms still remains. Kilnhurst goods yard, to the rear of the main station building, had a brick-built shed fitted with cranes. On closure these facilities were bought by Thomas Hill (Rotherham) Ltd, a subsidiary of Rolls-Royce Limited, who built and repaired industrial locomotives. In the late 1970s the goods shed was demolished and modern buildings erected for the company.

The Kilnhurst stationmaster had control over rail traffic and staff in an area which covered the local pottery and brickworks from the earliest days, and following their sinking collieries at Piccadilly and Kilnhurst (both accessed from the brickworks' branch) and Silverwood, accessed from a new, steeply graded line, built jointly by the MS&LR (GCR from 1899) and the Midland Railway. One unusual siding over which he had control was "Thrybergh Tip", a short spur off the Silverwood line which was a dumping ground for Sheffield Corporation sewage. This siding was usually known by a short but very descriptive title, as were the trains which brought its raw material.

The stationmaster had also control over another station, albeit both small and temporary. In 1959 at the request of the local Working Men's Clubs at Thrybergh a short, about 75 feet (23 m) in length, platform was built near the Park Lane bridge on the Silverwood line to serve the "Children's Outings" - seaside day trips for members and their children which were a regular feature in the clubland calendar. This was known as Thrybergh Tins platform, but it never had a name board to that effect. The platform was used on 3 or 4 occasions each year and closed in the mid-1960s.

The last stationmaster at Kilnhurst was Mr. George Adams, who moved to take over duties at Mexborough and amalgamated the positions at Kilnhurst with those of his new station until his retirement and the position of stationmaster ceasing.

| Preceding station | Disused railways | Following station |
|---|---|---|
| Parkgate and Aldwarke | Eastern Region of British Railways; Sheffield Victoria-Doncaster Line | Swinton Central |
