= St Peter's Church, Conisbrough =

Church in Conisbrough, South Yorkshire, England

Coordinates: 53.4830°N 1.2297°W

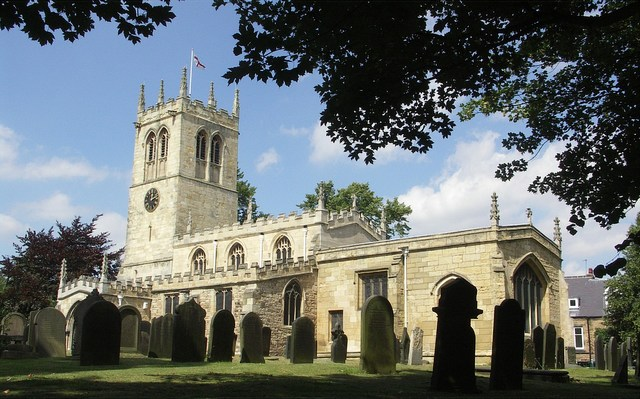
The church, seen from the south east

St Peter's Church is a parish church in Conisbrough, in South Yorkshire, in England.

The core of the church is believed to be 8th-century, based on similarities with Northumbrian churches known to date from this period. If this date is accurate, it is the oldest building in South Yorkshire. Historian David Hey argues that it was a minster church, forming the centre of a large, early parish, covering all or much of the 11th-century Fee of Conisbrough. From this early period survives much of the stonework of the tower and nave, including some windows, most of which were later blocked. Part of a 10th-century cross shaft has been discovered, and the church is recorded in the Domesday Book as having a single priest.

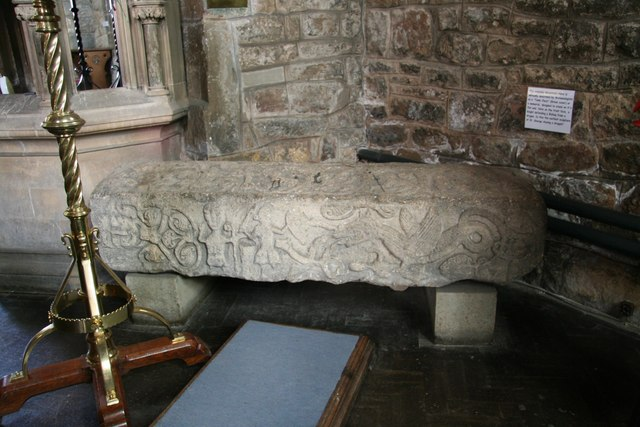
The 12th-century tomb chest

In the 12th century, aisles were added, and the chancel arch and south door also date from this period, as does a tomb chest in the south aisle. Rita Wood argues that the tomb is for William de Warenne, 3rd Earl of Surrey, who died in 1148, as it depicts battles and themes from The Song of Roland. The piscina and a cross slab in the north aisle are 13th-century. The church was next remodelled in the 14th century, from which time the present south aisle dates. In the 15th century, the tower was refaced, and a south porch and clerestory added. Many of the windows also date from this time. The north aisle was rebuilt in 1866, and there was a general restoration, followed by another later in the century, and in the 20th century, the porch was restored.

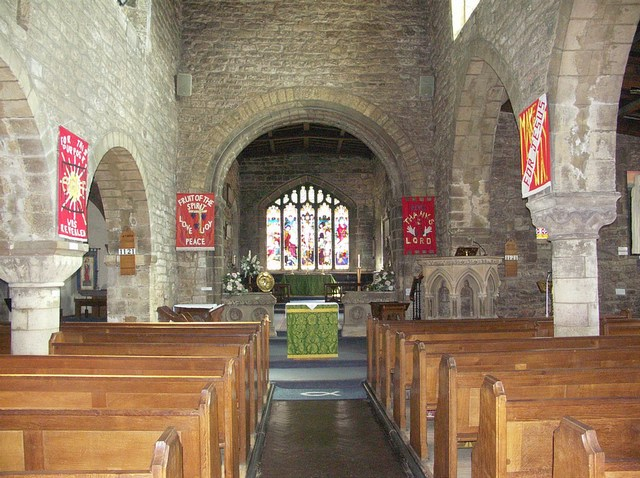
Interior view, looking towards the altar

The church is a grade I listed building.

== See also ==
- Grade I listed buildings in South Yorkshire
- Listed buildings in Conisbrough and Denaby
