= Mexborough railway station =

Railway station in South Yorkshire, England

Mexborough
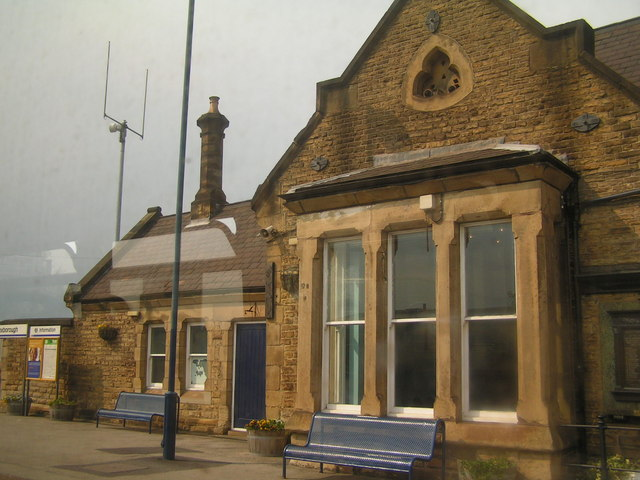

General information
- Location: Mexborough, Doncaster; England
- Coordinates: 53.491°N 1.289°W
- Grid reference: SK472996
- Manager: Northern Trains
- Transit authority: Travel South Yorkshire
- Platforms: 2

Other information
- Station code: MEX
- Fare zone: Doncaster
- Classification: DfT category D

History
- Opened: 4 March 1871

Passengers
- 2020/21: ▼48,590
- 2021/22: ▲0.136 million
- 2022/23: ▼0.122 million
- 2023/24: ▲0.153 million
- 2024/25: ▲0.170 million
- 2025/26: ▼0.166 million
Location
Notes
- Passenger statistics from the Office of Rail and Road

Mexborough railway station serves the town of Mexborough in the City of Doncaster in South Yorkshire, England. It is a station on the Sheffield to Doncaster Line 7 miles (11 km) south west of Doncaster.

As the original station at Mexborough Junction did not serve the line to Rotherham and Sheffield when this opened it was replaced by a new station built immediately on the Doncaster side of the junction. The new station was approximately halfway between Mexborough Junction and Mexborough (Ferry Boat) Halt and was able to serve the town centre at the top of Station Road.

It was on 1 June 1874 that the third side of the triangle (Mexborough Reverse Curve) was put in place which allowed trains to work from the Sheffield line to Barnsley without need of reversal. This was closed on 5 September 1966.

The Barnsley to Doncaster local passenger services were withdrawn on 29 June 1959 and further changes in the area took place with the opening of Aldwarke Junction in 1966. From this date all passenger trains to Sheffield were routed to Sheffield Midland: at first via the Swinton curve, until its closure in January 1968, and thereafter via the Great Central route through the closed Kilnhurst Central. Nowadays trains mostly operate via the re-instated Swinton curve to the new Swinton (a few passenger trains still use the old GCR line for operational reasons).

Mexborough once had a third platform which, in effect, made the Sheffield-bound platform an "island". This was used occasionally for regular passenger services travelling via the Great Central line to Sheffield but more often by excursion trains to East Coast resorts such as Scarborough, Bridlington and Cleethorpes. This platform face ceased to be used in the late 1970s but can still be seen.

As part of the South Yorkshire Passenger Transport Executive's 4-year plan for upgrading the railways in the county, Mexborough received an upgraded waiting area and ticket office which were completed in May 1989.

In 2009/2010, Mexborough was further improved by help points, an updated PA system, refurbished toilets and booking office area, additional shelters and CCTV, information screens and improved access for disabled people.

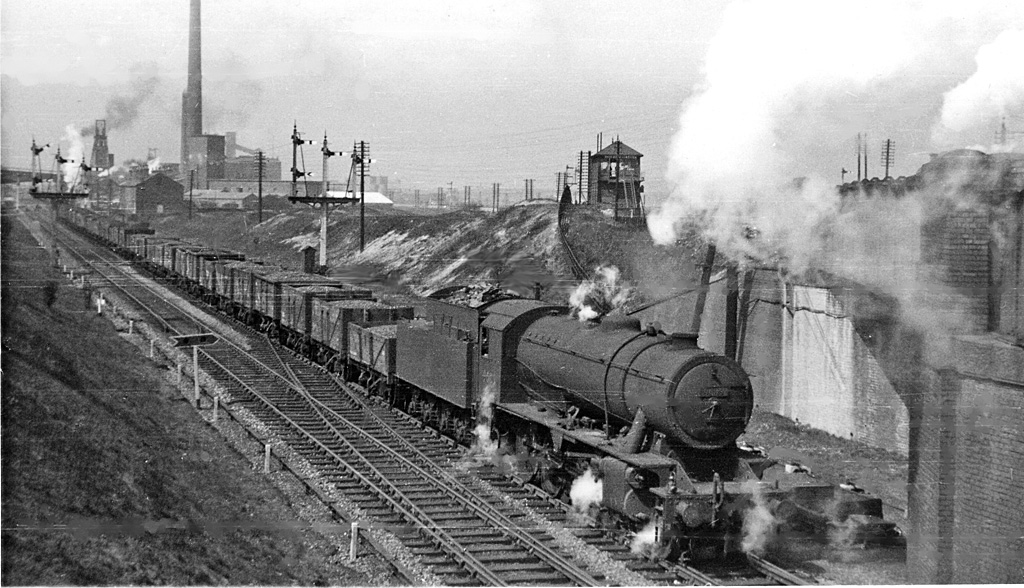
Mexborough West Junction in 1950

In 2011 Mexborough won the category 'Station of the Year (Small)' at the National Rail Awards.

== Facilities ==
The station's booking office is staffed each day on a part-time basis (06:00-19:00 Monday to Saturday, 08:00-15:00 Sundays). Outside these times, tickets must be bought on the train or in advance or at the two ticket machines, one on each platform and card payment only. There are waiting rooms and customer help points on both platforms. Digital display screens, timetable posters and automated train announcements offer train running information and there is step-free access to both platforms.

== Services ==
Monday to Sunday services consist of one train per hour each way westbound to Sheffield and eastbound to Doncaster and onwards to Adwick (services terminate at Doncaster on Sundays) with some peak time extras.

Services are generally formed of Class 150 DMUs and occasionally Class 158.

Preceding station	National Rail	Following station
Swinton	Northern Trains Swinton to Doncaster Line	Conisbrough
Disused railways
Swinton Central	British Rail Eastern Region Sheffield Victoria to Doncaster Line	Conisbrough
Wath Central	British Rail Eastern Region Doncaster to Barnsley Line	Conisbrough

== See also ==
- Listed buildings in Conisbrough and Denaby
