= St John's Church, Mexborough =

Church in Mexborough, South Yorkshire, England

Coordinates: 53°29′32″N 1°16′42″W

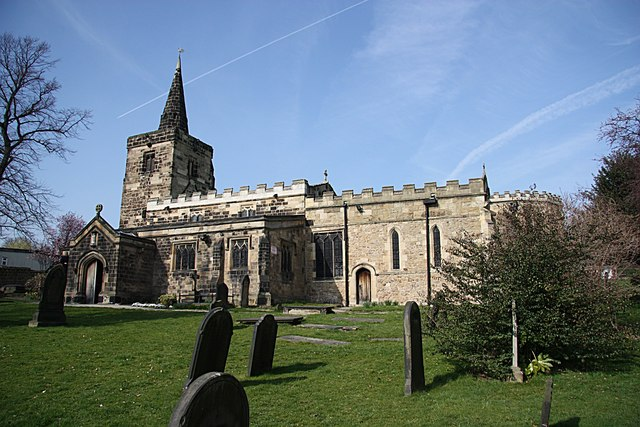
The church, in 2009

St John the Baptist Church is the parish church of Mexborough in South Yorkshire, in England.

The church was built in the 12th century, and the core survives from this period. The chancel is 13th century, while other parts date from the 14th and 15th century. The south aisle was rebuilt in 1891, and an apse was added. The church was Grade I listed in 1986. It is dedicated to St John the Baptist.

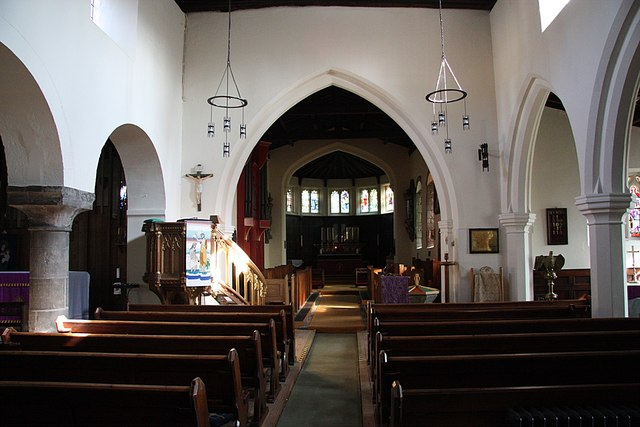
View from the nave into the chancel

The church is built of sandstone; the chancel with rubble, and other parts with coursed stone. The roofs are a mixture of lead and copper. The nave has north and south aisles, a south porch, and a clerestory on the north side. The tower is at the west end, with a two-light west window, buttresses, gargoyles, a parapet, and an octagonal spire. The chancel has a priest's door, several lancet windows, and one three-light window, in addition to the 19th century polygonal apse.

Inside, the nave roof is 15th or 16th century. There is a piscina in the chancel, and the font is Mediaeval. In the south aisle are the remains of a cross which dates from between the 10th and 12th centuries. There are several 17th-century monuments, and 17th-century oak panelling in the apse, which may have been relocated from Mexborough Old Hall. The Creed, Lord's Prayer and the Ten Commandments are inscribed in the north aisle, uncovered by the Victorian restoration, and some of the stalls were designed by Robert Thompson.

== See also ==
- Grade I listed buildings in South Yorkshire
- Listed buildings in Mexborough
