= Mexborough Junction railway station =

Former railway station in South Yorkshire, England

Mexborough Junction
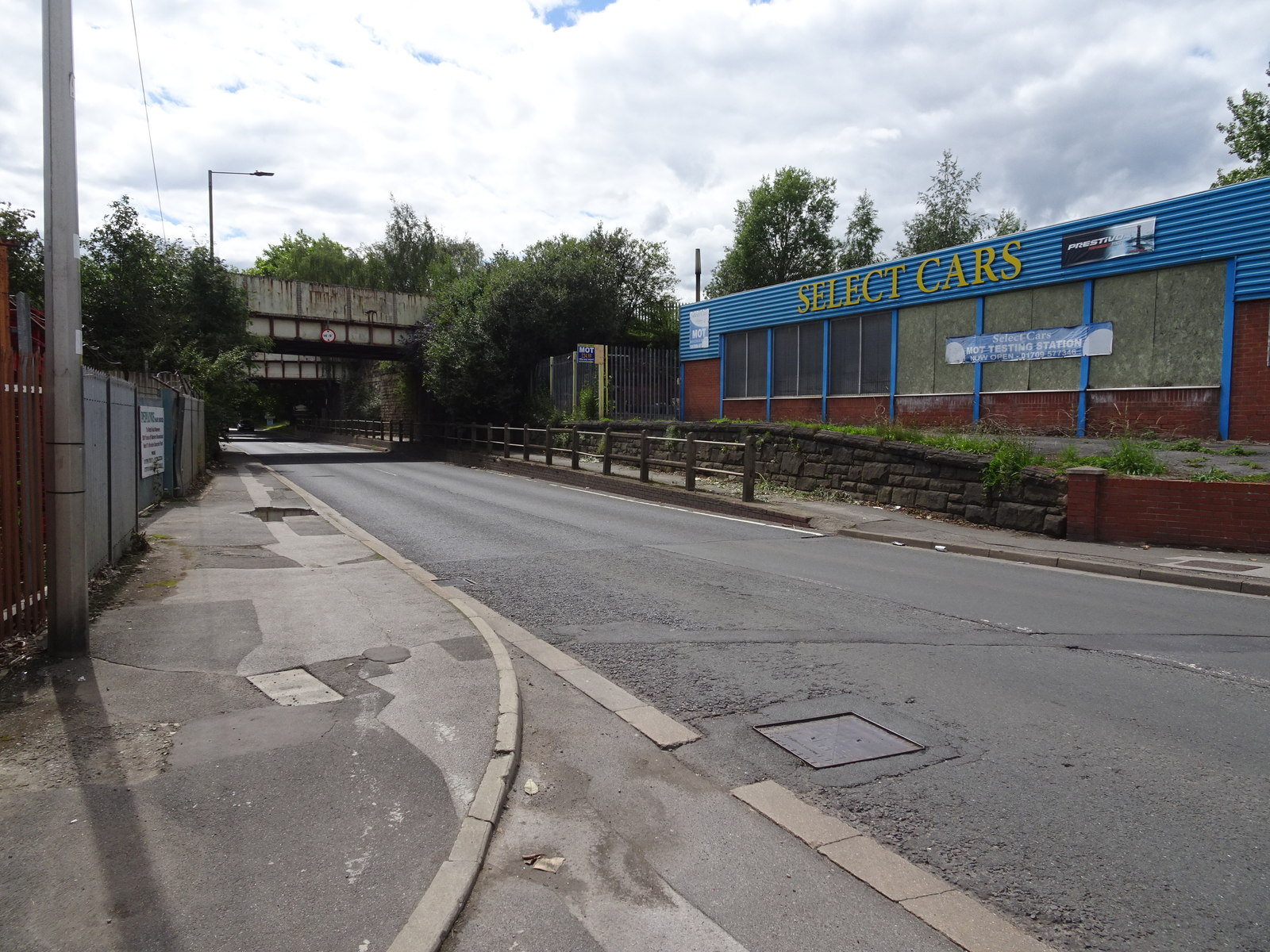
- Station site in July 2020.

General information
- Location: Mexborough, Doncaster; England
- Coordinates: 53.49193°N 1.29608°W
- Grid reference: SK468996

Other information
- Status: Disused

History
- Original company: South Yorkshire Railway

Key dates
- 1850: opened
- 1871: closed
Location

Mexborough Junction was one of two railway stations which served the former mining town of Mexborough in the Don Valley of South Yorkshire, England, prior to the present station being opened in 1871, the other being Mexborough (Ferry Boat) Halt.

Mexborough Junction station was opened by the South Yorkshire Railway at the point where the curve to Swinton on the North Midland Railway leaves their line to Barnsley, about 660 yards (600 m) west of the present railway station. The station was opened to passengers in January 1850 and closed, with the opening of the present station on 4 March 1871.

This station was some distance from the town centre which, at the time, was around the parish church and close by Ferry Boat Halt.
