= Ian Parks =

British poet

- Born: 1959 (age 66–67); Mexborough, West Riding of Yorkshire, England
- Occupations: Poet, creative writing tutor
- Writing career
- Genre: Poetry
- Notable works: *Shell Island* (2006); *The Exile's House* (2012); *Selected Poems 1983-2023*

Ian Parks (born 1959) is a British poet.

== Biography ==
Parks was born in Mexborough, which was then in the West Riding of Yorkshire.

He has taught creative writing at the universities of Sheffield, Oxford, Hull, and Leeds, and was Writing Fellow at De Montfort University, Leicester from 2012 to 2014.

He was a writer in residence at Gladstone's Library in 2012 and currently runs the Read to Write Project in Doncaster and Mexborough.

His collections include A Climb through Altered Landscapes (Blackwater, 1998), Shell Island (Waywiser, 2006), The Cage (Flux Gallery Press, 2008), Love Poems 1979-2009 (Flux Gallery Press, 2009) The Landing Stage (Lapwing, Belfast, 2010), The Exile's House (Waterloo, 2012), Citizens (Smokestack 2017) and The Sons of Darkness and the Sons of Light (Crooked Spire Press, 2025).

His poems have appeared in Poetry Review, The Times Literary Supplement, Poetry, London Magazine, The Chiron Review, Modern Poetry in Translation, and have been broadcast on BBC Radio 3.

A selection of his poems appears in Old City: New Rumours edited by Carol Rumens and Ian Gregson.

His versions of the modern Greek poet Constantine Cavafy, The Cavafy Variations (Rack Press) was published in 2013 and was a Poetry Book Society Choice. If Possible: Cavafy Poems was published by Calder Valley Poetry in 2018 and was shortlisted for aMichael Marks Award; Body, Remember: Cavafy Poems also from Calder Valley, was published in 2019.

His Selected Poems of Harold Massingham was published by Calder Valley Poetry in 2021.

His own Selected Poems 1983-2023 is published by Calder Valley Poetry. His work is included in the Folio Society Love Poems edited by Imtiaz Dharker.
