= Old Market Hall, Mexborough =

Pub in Mexborough, South Yorkshire, England

Coordinates: 53.4928°N 1.2874°W

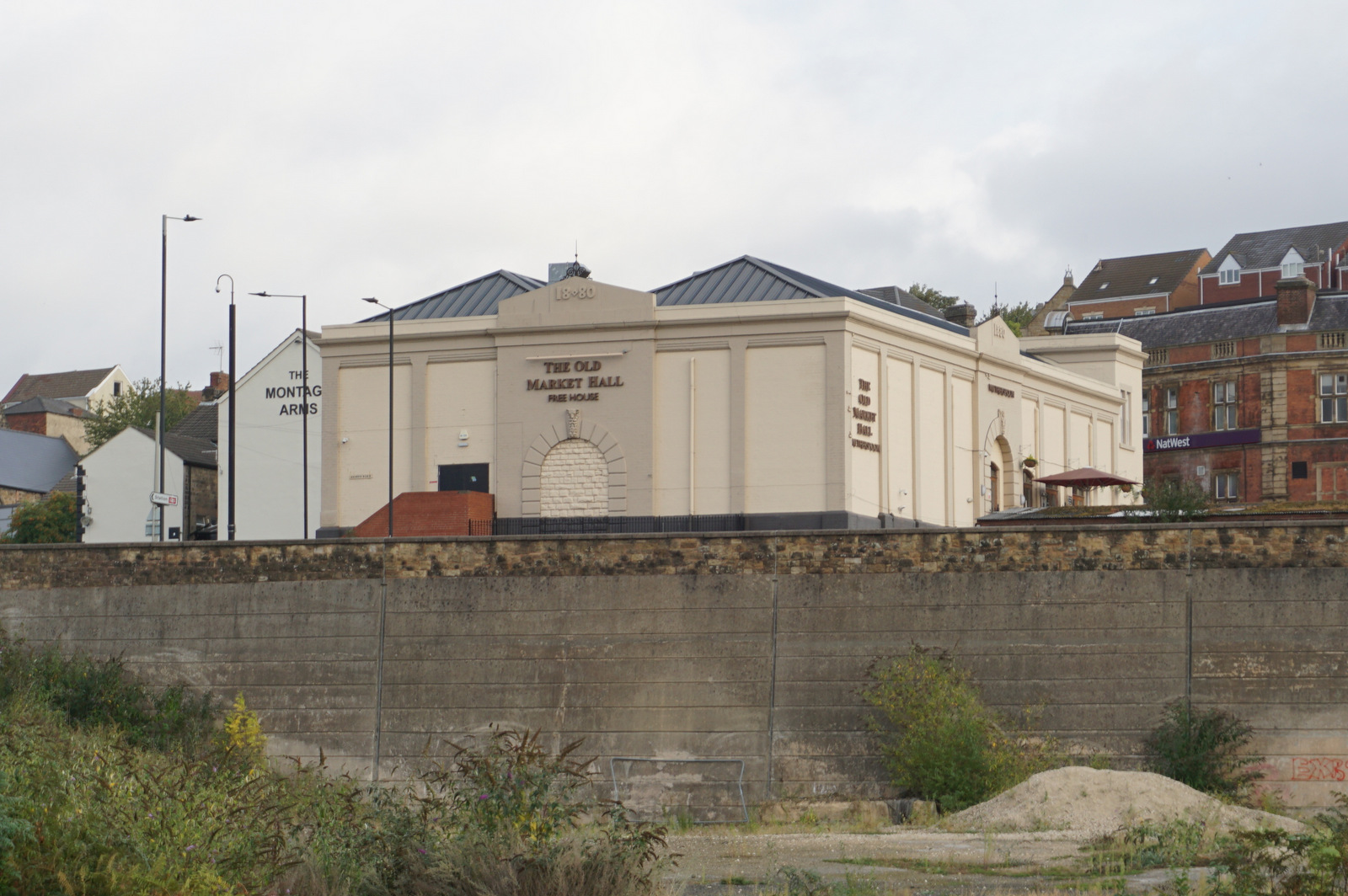
The building, in 2018

The Old Market Hall is a pub in Mexborough, a town in South Yorkshire, in England, which formerly served as a market and town hall.

In the 1870s, the Mexborough Local Board of Health was offered land to construct a covered market. It was undecided until Joel Kirby offered to manage the market; it did not take up his offer, but he did conduct the opening ceremony, in July 1880. The design of the building was based on the Norfolk Market Hall in Sheffield, but on a smaller scale. It comprised a main hall 93 feet (28 m) by 57 feet (17 m), with twenty shops lining the outside: ten for general butchers, and ten for pork butchers and other grocers. In the centre were 18 stalls, and there were four further stands at the north end. It had a glazed roof, 20 feet (6.1 m) high at its peak. There were entrances on all sides, that from the west up a flight of steps. There was a cellar underneath, used for storage for the weighman's office, and at the north end were a suite of offices for the local board, with a meeting room above, having a capacity of 200 people.

The market was a success, and in 1927 it was stated that it "has had much to do with the prosperity of the town as any other single factor". Meanwhile, Mexborough Urban District Council, which was successor to the local board of health, established its own offices in Adwick Road. In 1974, the market moved to a new building, and the entire structure was later converted into a pub, now operated by Wetherspoons.
