= Peter Didsbury =

English poet

Peter Didsbury (born 1946) is an English poet who was born in Fleetwood, Lancashire but lived most of his life in Hull, in the East Riding of Yorkshire. There, he worked as an archaeologist and creative writing tutor.

== Works ==
Didsbury's poetry collections, all published by Bloodaxe Books, are The Butchers of Hull (1982), The Classical Farm (1987), That Old-Time Religion (1994) and A Natural History, incorporated in Scenes from a Long Sleep: New and Collected Poems (2003).

Didsbury appeared in the 1982 Bloodaxe anthology, A Rumoured City, edited by Douglas Dunn and featuring other Hull poets such as Sean O’Brien, Douglas Houston and Tony Flynn, as well as its sequel, Carol Rumens' and Ian Gregson's Old City, New Rumours: A Hull Anthology (Five Leaves Press, 2010). He was also associated with the Hull journal Bête Noire. Some critics, however, have seen him as more correctly aligned with the radical poetics of the British Poetry Revival.
