= Conisbrough railway station =

Railway station in South Yorkshire, England

Conisbrough
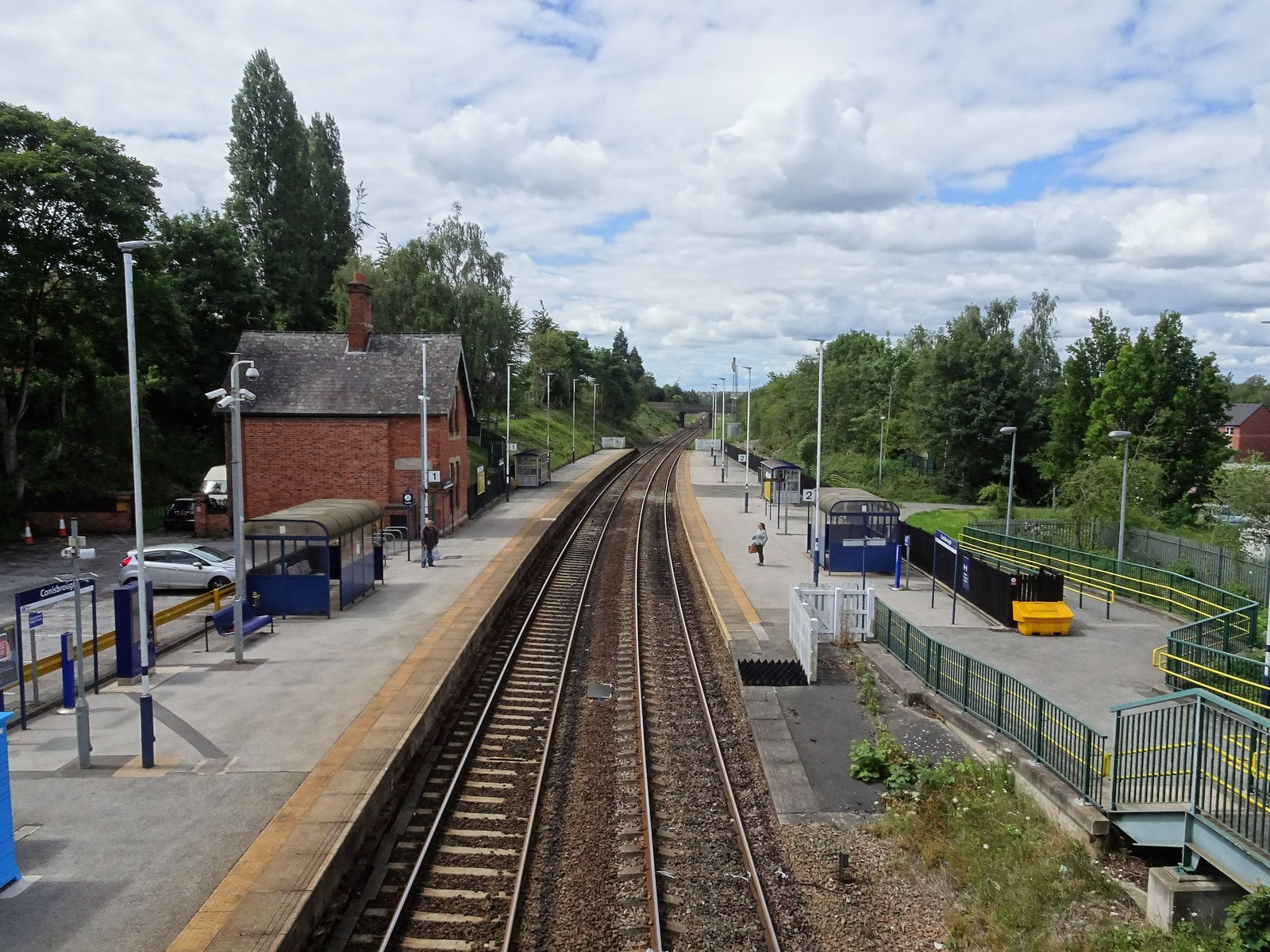
- Station in July 2020.

General information
- Location: Conisbrough, Doncaster; England
- Coordinates: 53.489380°N 1.234170°W
- Grid reference: SK509994
- Managed by: Northern Trains
- Transit authority: Travel South Yorkshire
- Platforms: 2

Other information
- Station code: CNS
- Fare zone: Doncaster
- Classification: DfT category F2

Passengers
- 2020/21: ▼22,550
- 2021/22: ▲68,660
- 2022/23: ▼61,596
- 2023/24: ▲81,770
- 2024/25: ▲96,416
Location
Notes
- Passenger statistics from the Office of Rail and Road

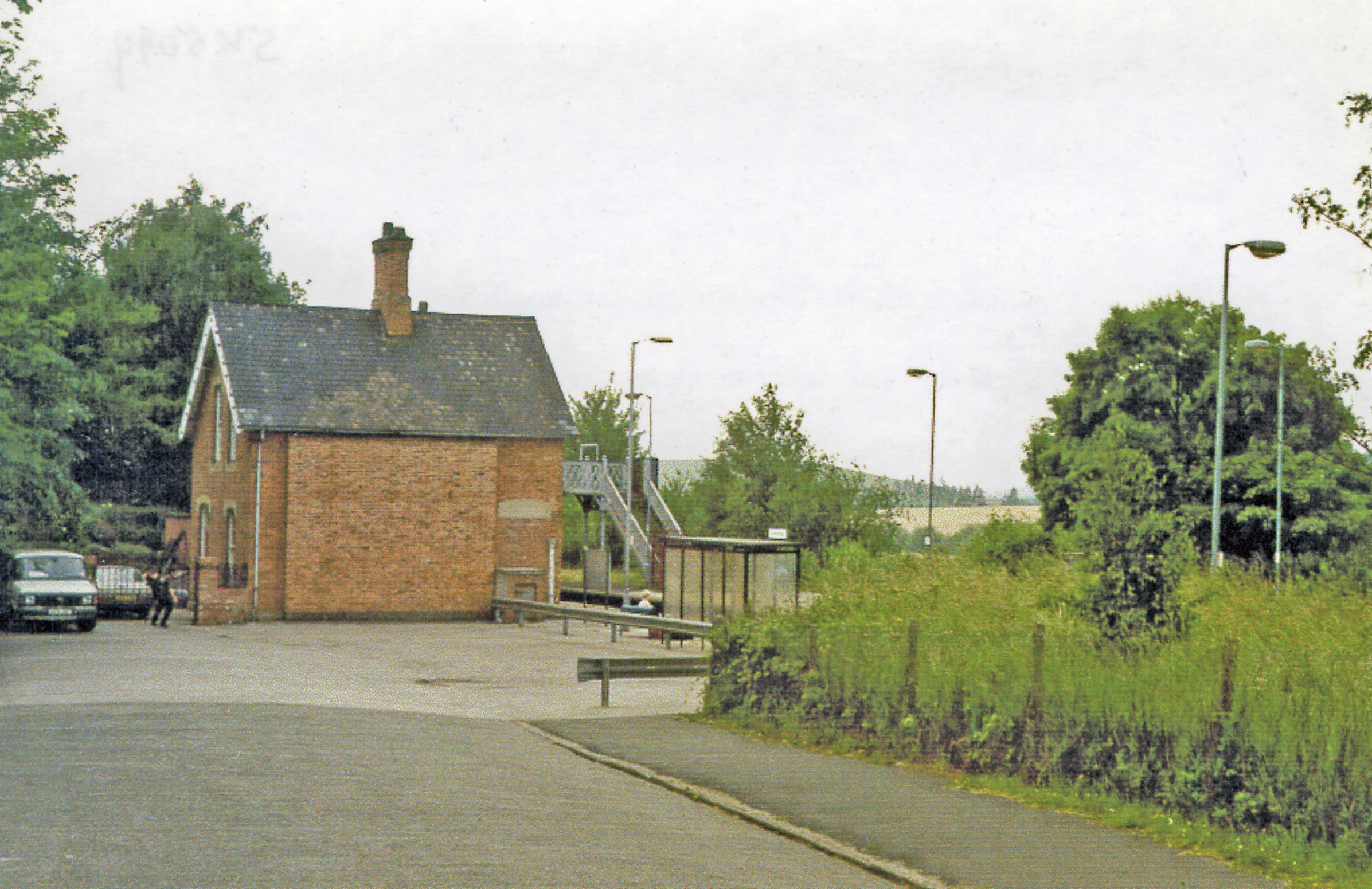
Station approach (1992)

Conisbrough railway station is a railway station in Conisbrough, South Yorkshire, England. It has two platforms and is served by stopping services.

Situated to the north-east of the station between the River Don and Conisbrough tunnel is a passing loop. This is used for freight to allow passenger services to pass. It has previously been used for commuter trains also allowing faster trains to pass. The branch has access to both Doncaster & Sheffield trains.

== History ==
The original station was situated some 150 yards (140 m) to the east of the present station and had two sets of station buildings, one for the South Yorkshire Railway, its owners, and another for the Midland Railway, the operators of the first passenger service. Both had their own staff. This station was opened on 10 November 1849, the only station on the new line linking Doncaster and Swinton. This was closed in 1884 with the opening of the new station, built by the Manchester, Sheffield and Lincolnshire Railway. The buildings were in that company's "double pavilion" style and all except the former Station Master's house, on the Sheffield bound platform, have been demolished.

The station, like Mexborough, was served by trains between Sheffield Victoria and Doncaster. The line closed south of Mexborough when most of the stations were shut down due to the Beeching Cuts.

Like Mexborough the station had three platforms with the Doncaster bound platform being an island. During Doncaster race meetings this platform was used for "ticket collection" to avoid congestion at Doncaster. In more recent times this platform was used for excursions which required an elongated stop for loading/unloading and could then enable another service to pass and use the other platform face.

In April 1993 the station received a new signing as part of a general clean-up and was equipped with ramps to give disabled access to the Doncaster-bound platform. The new signs gave the spelling of the name as "Conisborough", however, these were replaced by 21 May with the spelling corrected. An extra set of steps was created from what was the old platform 3. This gave direct access to The Earth Centre, Doncaster

The station had an upgrade in 2015 which saw the introduction of digital real-time arrival and departure displays on each platform. The platforms also received new shelters for the growing passenger numbers.

== Facilities ==
The station is unstaffed and has no ticket provision - all tickets must be purchased prior to travel or on the train. Shelters are provided on each platform and there are automatic train running announcements provided along with the CIS screens mentioned above. Step-free access is available to both platforms.

== Services ==
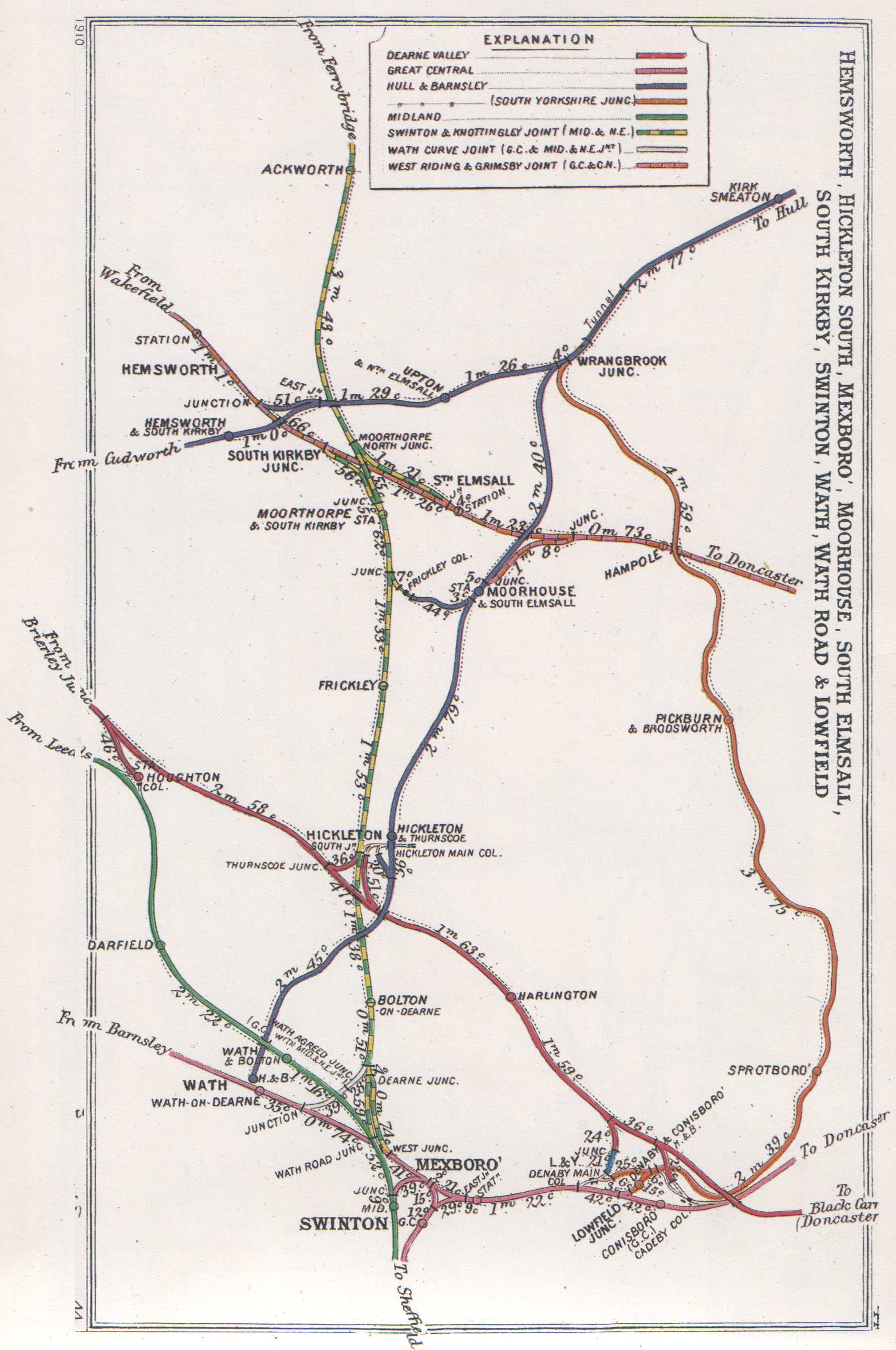
Railway Clearing House diagram showing lines around Conisbrough in 1910.

All services from this station are operated by Northern Trains. All services operate between Doncaster and Sheffield on an hourly basis, with most Doncaster services extending through to Adwick. Since the winter 2019 timetable change, there are no longer regular through workings to Hull Paragon - passenger now have to change at Doncaster for onward connections, whilst the frequency has also dropped from the twice-hourly pattern in use before the pandemic.

On evenings and Sundays, there is an hourly service towards both Sheffield and Doncaster.

Preceding station	National Rail	Following station
Mexborough	Northern Trains Swinton to Doncaster Line	Doncaster
