= Conisbrough =

Town in South Yorkshire, England

- Town
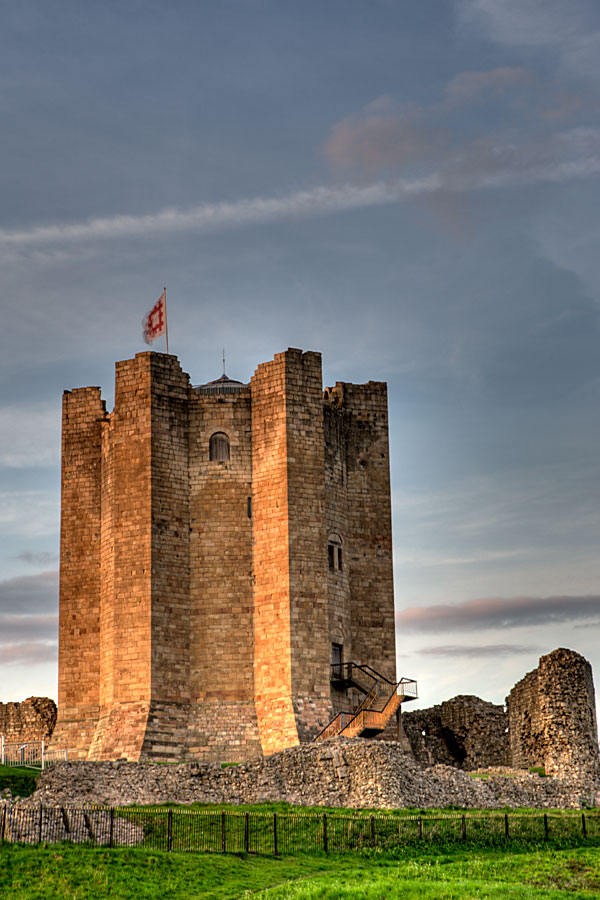
- Conisbrough Castle

- Shown within the City of Doncaster Location within South Yorkshire
- Area: 3.15 sq mi (8.2 km^{2})
- Population: 14,333 (2011 census)
  - Density: 4,550/sq mi (1,760/km^{2})
- OS grid reference: SK5198
- Metropolitan borough: City of Doncaster
- Metropolitan county: South Yorkshire
- Region: Yorkshire and the Humber
- Country: England
- Sovereign state: United Kingdom
- Post town: DONCASTER
- Postcode district: DN12
- Dialling code: 01709
- Police: South Yorkshire
- Fire: South Yorkshire
- Ambulance: Yorkshire
- UK Parliament: Rawmarsh and Conisbrough

Conisbrough (/ˈkɒnɪsbrə/) is a town within the City of Doncaster, in South Yorkshire, England. It is roughly midway between Doncaster and Rotherham, and is built alongside the River Don at 53°29′N 1°14′W. It has a ward population (Conisbrough and Denaby) of 14,333.

== Etymology ==
The name Conisbrough comes from the Old English Cyningesburh (first recorded c. 1000) meaning "king's stronghold" or "king's fortified place". Its derivation has a very similar route to Kingsbury.

== History ==
The historian David Hey describes Conisbrough as appearing to be the most important place in Anglo-Saxon and Viking South Yorkshire. In a will of around 1003, Conisbrough was bequeathed by Wulfric Spott, founder of Burton Abbey. At this point, it appears to have been the centre of a major former royal estate, reaching Hatfield Chase. The manor became royal again under Harold II of England, and by the Norman Conquest, 28 townships in what is now South Yorkshire belonged to the Lord of Conisbrough. William the Conqueror gave the whole lordship to William de Warenne.

The name of Conisbrough relates to a king's stronghold and this is usually presumed to have either been on the site of Conisbrough Castle, or of the parish church. At the time of the Norman Conquest, the manor of Conisbrough was held by Harold II - he was defeated at the Battle of Hastings. Conisbrough Castle is contained within an artificial oval-shaped enclosure similar to one used as wapentake meeting-places at Gringley on the Hill and East Markham, leading Malcolm Dolby to suppose the castle site may have once been the meeting-place of the Strafforth and Tickhill wapentake.

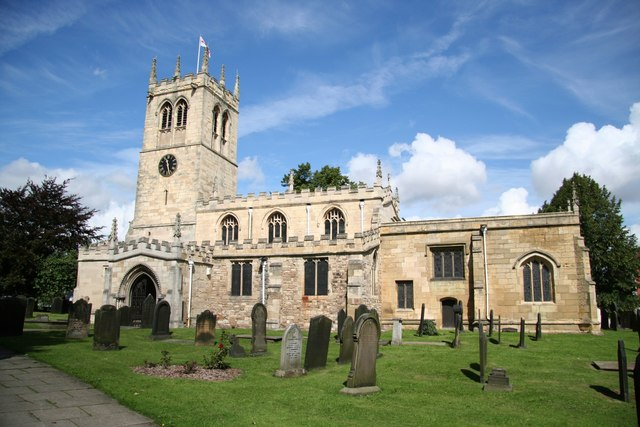
St Peter's Church, Conisbrough

Conisbrough contains what is believed to be the oldest building in South Yorkshire: the probably 8th-century St Peter's Church. The church was enlarged in the twelfth century, and David Hey claims that it was a Minster church, forming the centre of a large, early parish covering all or much of the eleventh century Fee of Conisbrough.

Peter Langtoft, writing in the 13th century, claimed that Egbert of Wessex had been received at "Burghe Conane", which is often identified with Conisbrough.

Conisbrough Urban District was the unit of local government between 1921 and 1974, when the area was incorporated into the new Metropolitan Borough of Doncaster.

=== Kilner connection ===
In 1863, the Kilner company opened a glass-making plant in Conisbrough. "The bottles made at Conisbrough are chiefly mineral water, spice, confectionery, wine and spirits, pickle, medicine, and chemists. and druggists bottles of all descriptions." In 1866, Caleb Kilner was sent to manage it, along with his cousin Kilner Bateson. In 1937, the Kilner company went bankrupt. Rights to the Kilner Jar product line were sold to the United Glass Bottle Manufacturers in the same year.

=== Literature ===
Geoffrey of Monmouth wrote about the town, claiming that it had been fortified by Ambrosius Aurelianus, King of the Britons after his victory over the Anglo-Saxon forces of Hengist, that the captive Anglo-Saxon leader Hengist was hacked to pieces by Eldol outside the town walls, and was buried at "Hengist's Mound" in the town.

In Walter Scott's novel Ivanhoe, 'Coningsburgh Castle' is based on Conisbrough. Scott's Coningsburgh is an Anglo-Saxon fortress, based (perhaps knowingly) on the mistaken conclusion that its unique style marked it as a non-Norman castle. The great tower is described specifically, so that it is clear that Scott has the Norman version of Conisbrough in mind.

=== Earth Centre ===
In the mid-1990s, a new tourist attraction, Earth Centre, opened on the nearby site of the former Cadeby Main Colliery. It closed in 2005 after it failed to attract the expected number of visitors. A leisure centre has been built on the site of the former Denaby Main Colliery. In the 2008 drama Survivors, the Earth centre was used as the place Abby was shot and taken in.

=== Sporting links ===
It has also been a host to the Olympic torch relay for the 2012 London Olympics.

Yorkshire saw the Grand Départ for the Tour de France in 2014. After this, Yorkshire hosted Le Tour de Yorkshire. In 2016 the tour came through Conisbrough, passing the famous castle on its way to Doncaster.

=== Cultural Links ===
In January 2026, Conisbrough officially bid for the title of the UK's first-ever Town of Culture for 2028. Backed by local leaders like John Healey MP, the bid highlights the town’s deep historical significance, ranging from the iconic 12th-century Conisbrough Castle and its literary link to Sir Walter Scott’s Ivanhoe to its industrial mining heritage.

== Notable people ==
- Richard of Conisburgh, 3rd Earl of Cambridge (1385-1415). It was through his marriage to Anne de Mortimer that the House of York made its claim to the English throne in the Wars of the Roses.
- Cyril Snipe (1888–1944) was a motor racing driver who won the 1912 Targa Florio in Sicily driving an Italian SCAT motor car.
- Tony Christie (born Anthony Fitzgerald, 25 April 1943), a singer most famous for his hit single "(Is This the Way to) Amarillo", was born in the town.
- Ian D. Clark (born 1950), Canadian actor, lived his first 16 years in Conisbrough
- Alan Sunderland footballer
- David Allen, boxer. The current WBA Intercontinental heavyweight champion.
- Mark Herbert is an English film producer and joint CEO of the Sheffield-based production company Warp Films.
- Conner Kelsall (born 6 February 1999) is an English professional boxer who has held the Commonwealth flyweight title since 28 June 2024.

== Education ==
Conisbrough has one secondary school, the De Warenne Academy (formerly Northcliffe School). The Emmanuel Schools Foundation's scheme to turn Northcliffe into an academy was scrapped after protests by parents, students and staff, despite the backing of former Conisbrough councillor Aidan Rave and former Doncaster Mayor Martin Winter.

Primary education in Conisbrough is provided by Ivanhoe Academy, Castle Academy (formerly Station Road School), Morley Place Academy, Rowena Academy and Balby Street Primary.

Further education has been available at the De Warrene Academy from 2010, but some people in the village attend Dearne Valley College, Doncaster College or other colleges further afield.

== Media ==
Local news and television programmes are provided by BBC Yorkshire and ITV Yorkshire. Television signals are received from the Emley Moor and the local relay TV transmitters.

Local radio stations are BBC Radio Sheffield, Heart Yorkshire, Greatest Hits Radio Yorkshire, Hits Radio South Yorkshire, and Sine FM, a community based station which broadcast from Doncaster.

The town is served by the local newspaper, Doncaster Free Press.

== Amenities ==
The town lies at the junction of the A6023 and the A630 Doncaster - Rotherham road. To the west is Denaby Main. The street formerly known as Butt Hole Road, now Archers Way, is located in Conisbrough.

== Public transport ==
=== Bus services ===
The main bus operator in the town is Stagecoach Yorkshire, providing an extensive network of services into Doncaster & throughout the Dearne Valley, referred to as "The Dearne Link". Buses run at least every ten minutes into Doncaster & Mexborough and at least half-hourly through to Barnsley, Wath, Cortonwood & Rotherham. First South Yorkshire also operates a service through Conisbrough, running at least every twenty minutes throughout the day between Sheffield and Doncaster on its X3 route.

=== Rail services ===
The town is served by Conisbrough railway station and the main operator from the railway station is Northern. There are frequent services in both directions from Conisbrough railway station to destinations including Doncaster, Mexborough, Swinton, Rotherham, and Sheffield. Trains that pass through, but do not stop, including Cross Country services from the north-east to south, TransPennine Express services between Manchester and Cleethorpes, and semi-fast Northern services between Sheffield, Hull, and Scarborough. Recently, Stagecoach restored bus services past the railway station after an absence of almost ten years. The X20 links Doncaster and Barnsley.

== See also ==
- Listed buildings in Conisbrough and Denaby
