= Mexborough =

Town in South Yorkshire, England

Coordinates: 53°29′37″N 1°17′11″W

- Town
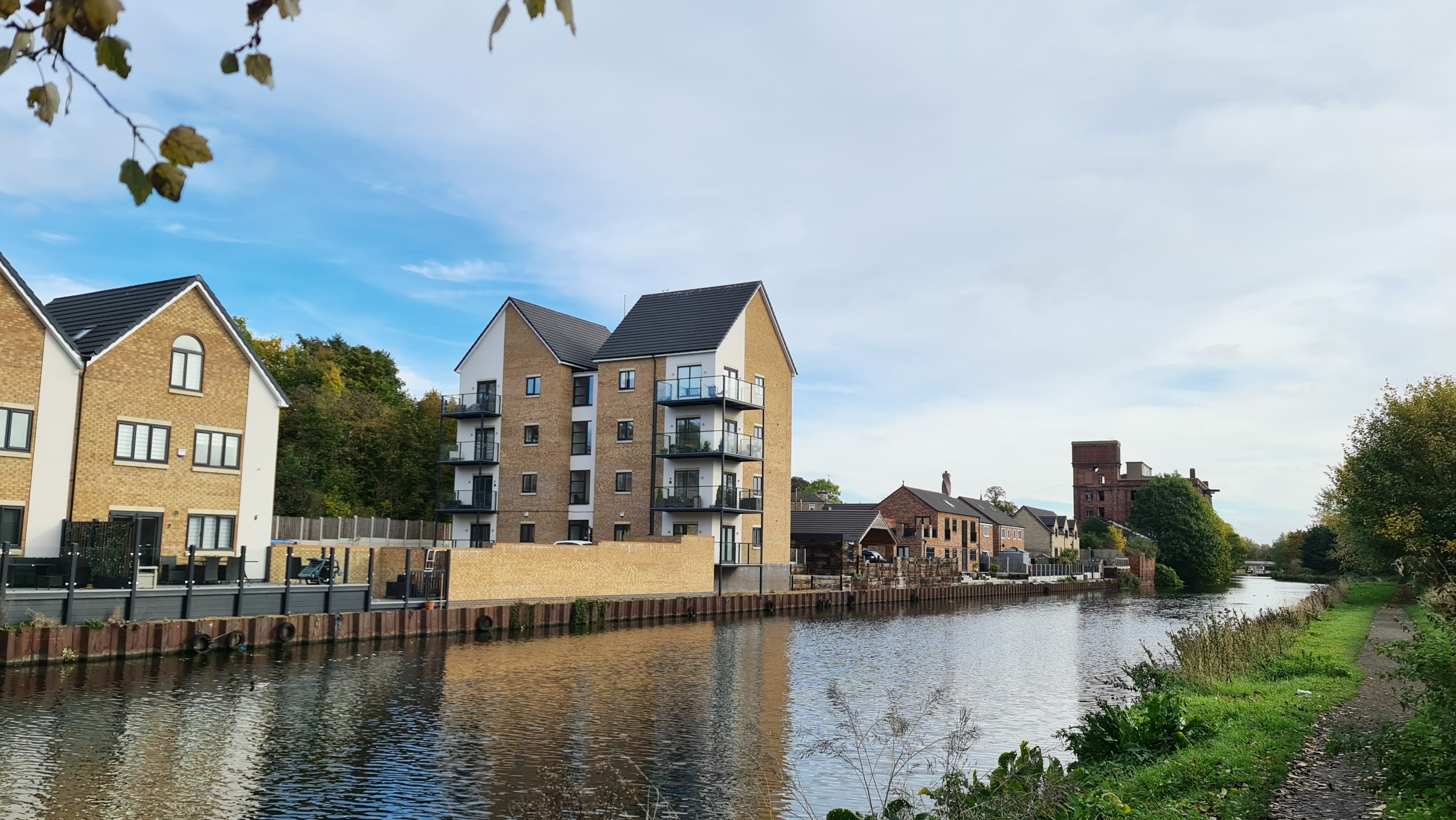
- River Don Navigation

- Shown within the Borough of Doncaster Location within South Yorkshire
- Population: 15,244 (Ward. 2011 census)
- OS grid reference: SE4700
- Metropolitan borough: City of Doncaster
- Metropolitan county: South Yorkshire
- Region: Yorkshire and the Humber
- Country: England
- Sovereign state: United Kingdom
- Post town: Mexborough
- Postcode district: S64
- Dialling code: 01709
- Police: South Yorkshire
- Fire: South Yorkshire
- Ambulance: Yorkshire
- UK Parliament: Doncaster North

Mexborough is a town in the City of Doncaster District, South Yorkshire, England, between Manvers and Denaby Main, on the River Don close to where it joins the River Dearne, and the A6023 road. It is contiguous with Swinton to the southwest and Conisbrough to the east.

Historically part of the West Riding of Yorkshire, Mexborough had a population of 15,244 at the 2011 Census.

== Toponym ==
The name of Mexborough is a combination of an Old English or Old Norse personal name, which may be Mec, Meoc or Mjukr, and the suffix burh, meaning a fortified place, in Old English.

== History ==
Mexborough is located at the north-eastern end of a dyke known as the Roman Ridge, which is thought to have been constructed either by the Brigantian tribes in the 1st century AD, perhaps as a defence against the Roman invasion of Britain, or after the 5th century to defend the British kingdom of Elmet from the Angles.

The earliest known written reference to Mexborough is found in the Domesday Book of 1086 (Mechesburg), which states that before the Norman Conquest of England the area had been controlled by the Saxon lords Wulfheah and Ulfkil. Following the Conquest, the area fell under the control of the Norman Baron Roger de Busli. The remains of an earthwork in Castle Park are thought to have been a motte-and-bailey castle constructed in the 11th century shortly after the Conquest.

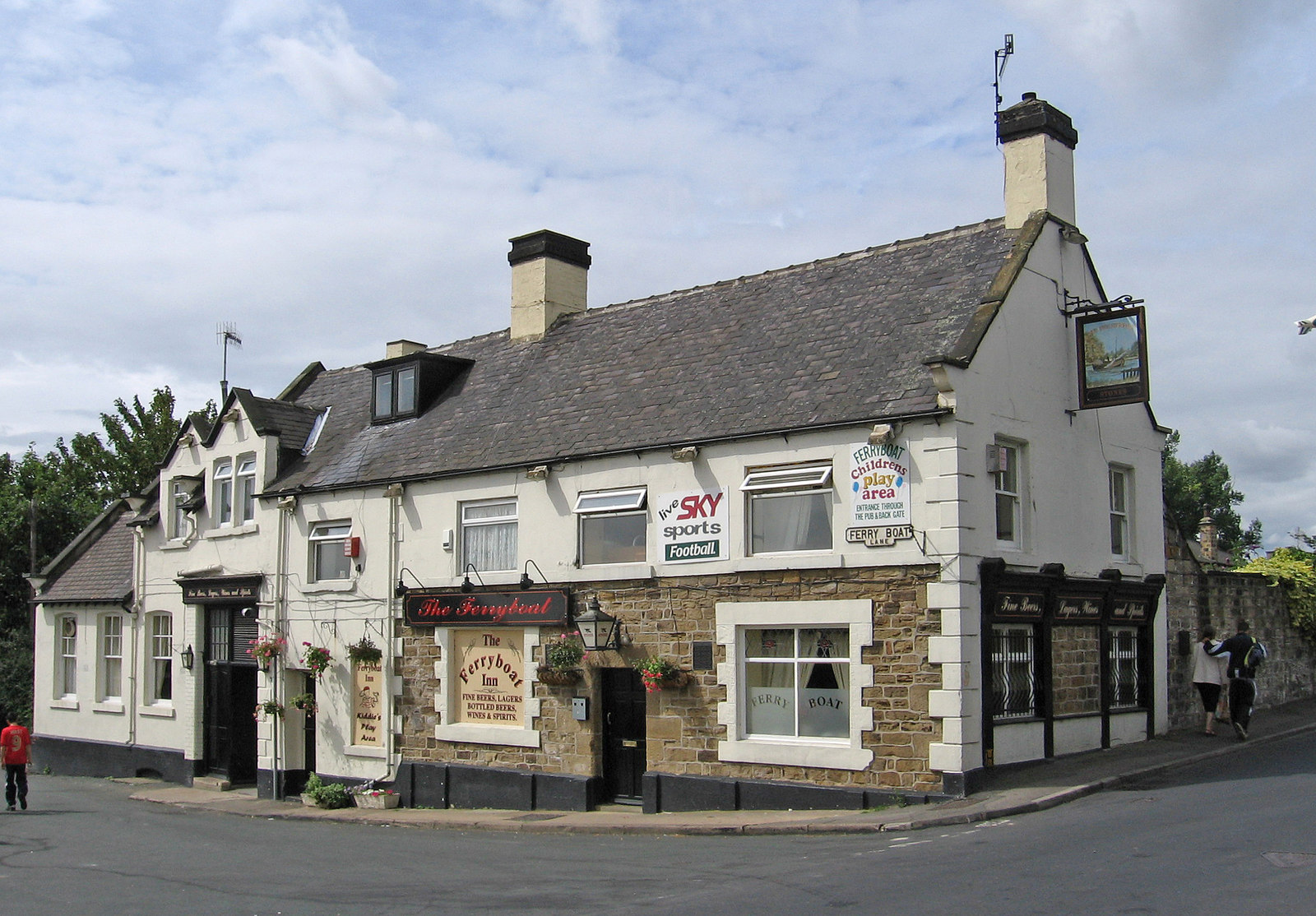
The Ferryboat Inn

St John the Baptist's Church includes elements that date from the 12th century. A few other pre-1800 buildings remain, including several public houses: the Ferryboat Inn, the George and Dragon, the Bull's Head and the Red Lion. Most of the buildings in the town are post-1800.

Throughout the 18th, 19th and much of the 20th century the town's economy was based around coal mining, quarrying, brickworks and the production of ceramics, and it soon became a busy railway junction. These industries led to an increase in industrial illness and an increase in the mortality rate. Although the town boasted a cottage hospital, the lack of suitable facilities led to Lord Montagu donating land for a new hospital to be built. Lord Montagu laid the first stone at the site in 1904. The site is still a working hospital, which now forms part of the Doncaster and Bassetlaw NHS trust.

The industries that led to the creation of Montagu Hospital not only brought problems to the town but also led to an increase in population and, for some, an increase in wealth and opportunity. Many more public houses and other businesses were created, many of which are still trading today. It was in one of these public houses, the Montagu Arms, that Stan Laurel stayed overnight after performing at the town's Prince of Wales Theatre on 9 December 1907.

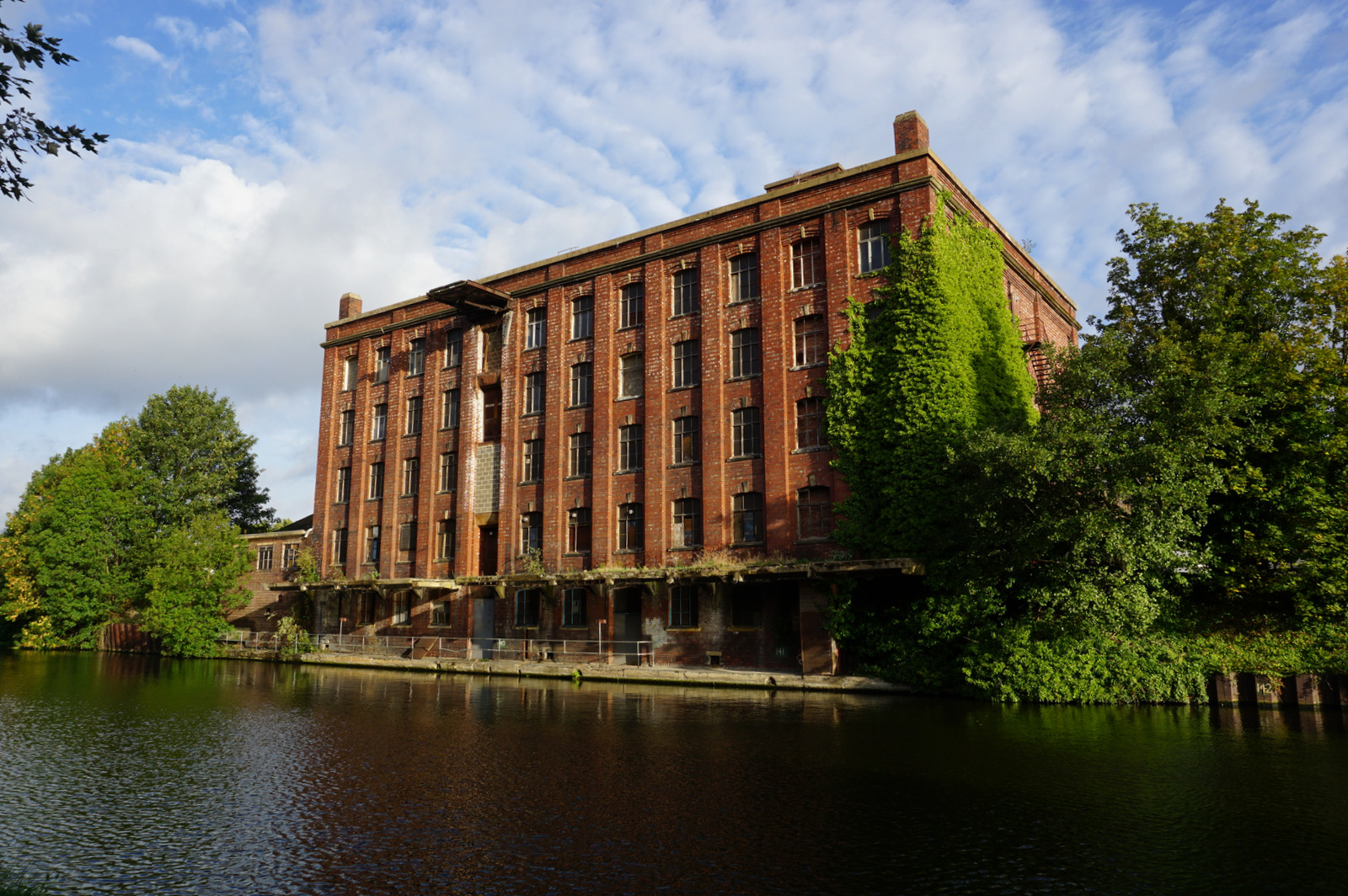
Barnsley British Cooperative Society flour mill

During the second half of the 19th century, as in many other industrial towns, a Cooperative Society was formed in Mexborough. It was modelled on the consumer cooperative set up by the Rochdale Pioneers in 1844. In 1861, nine working men met at the home of James Simpson in Mexborough and decided to form the Mexborough Working Men's Industrial Society (later renamed the Mexborough Cooperative Society). The aim of the Society was to supply (at first to the nine men themselves) the necessary things of life. Membership quickly grew and by the 1890s it stood at 1,200. At one time, there were ten shops across the built-up area of Mexborough. By 1903, land had been purchased in the middle of Mexborough on which to build a large and grand new central store, but then suddenly in 1904 the Mexborough Cooperative Society went into liquidation. Soon afterwards it was taken over by the Barnsley British Co-operative Society. One of Mexborough's landmarks is closely associated with the Cooperative Society. This is the former Barnsley British Cooperative Society flour mill, which stands on the north side of the River Don Navigation, close to the Church of St John the Baptist. It started off as the "Don Roller Mills". It was owned by James White, who sold it to the Barnsley British Cooperative Society in 1912.

The Old Market Hall opened in 1880, and was replaced by the current indoor market in 1974, with the old building later becoming a pub.

For more than a hundred years the railway locomotive maintenance and stabling depot (colloquially known as "Mexborough Loco") was a major employer. The South Yorkshire, Doncaster and Goole Railway arrived in Mexborough in 1850. The extensive coal traffic generated by the local collieries required railway locomotives to haul it and these locomotives required driving, firing, refuelling, maintenance and stabling. Mexborough was chosen as the site for a large 15-road depot. In its heyday it had an allocation of about 150 locomotives. In the 1920s it was the stabling point for the LNER Garratt, then the most powerful locomotive in the UK. The depot closed in 1964. Following the demise of coal-mining in the 1980s, Mexborough, like many ex-mining towns and villages, is still in the process of economic and social recovery.

=== Ceramics ===
The Rock Pottery originally operated as Beevers & Ford. In 1839 it was bought by James Reed, whose son John renamed the business the "Mexborough Pottery", and expanded the works. On the bankruptcy of the Rockingham Pottery in 1842, John Reed bought many of its moulds and continued their production, though with different transfer prints and also in a plain green with a leaf design impressed "Reed".

== Politics ==
Before 2010, Mexborough was in the Barnsley East and Mexborough constituency. Since then, it has been in the Doncaster North constituency, whose current MP is Ed Miliband, former leader of the Labour Party.

Local party Mexborough First did hold all three seats in the Mexborough ward on Doncaster Metropolitan Borough Council but following the defection of Bev Chapman to Labour it (Mexborough First) only holds two seats.

In late 2023, Glenn Bluff, Doncaster City Councillor for neighbouring Adwick-on-Dearne in the Sprotbrough ward and Parish Councillor for Neighbouring Barnburgh and Harlington announced he was standing against sitting MP Ed Miliband in the next general election and one of his first priorities was a town council for Mexborough, a concept known locally as Mexit. In December 2023, a meeting was held and jointly hosted by Bev Chapman and Glenn Bluff, from opposing parties to push forward the concept of a town council that has since received local support and has a Facebook page.

== Transport ==
=== Rail ===
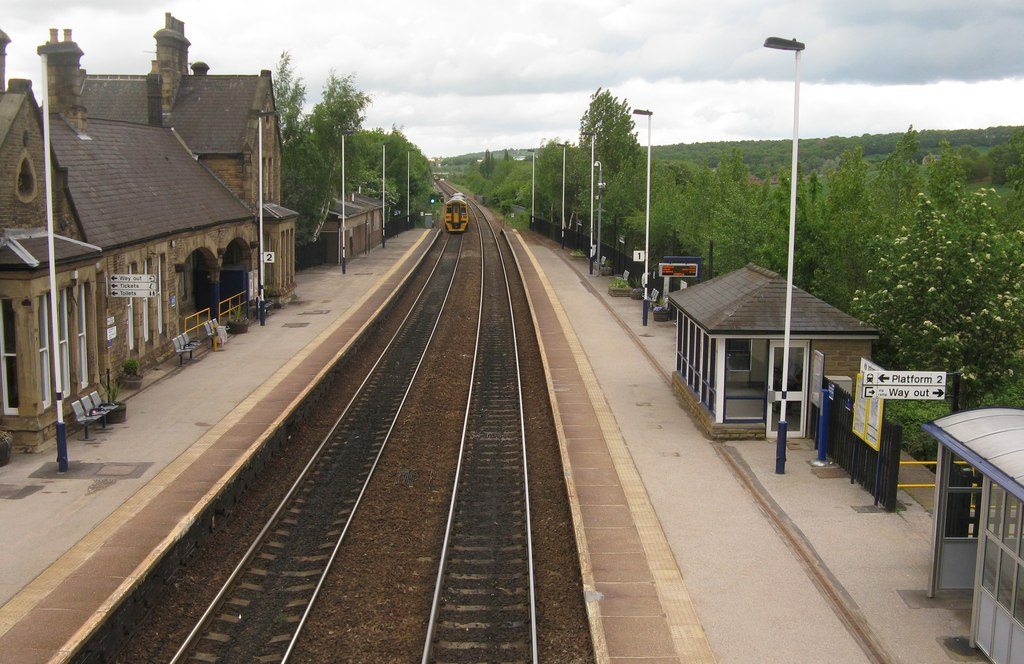
Mexborough railway station

Mexborough railway station is located on the south bank of the River Don on Station Road, a short cul-de-sac off the A6023 Greens Way dual carriageway on the south side of the town. It is served by local stopping trains towards Doncaster and Sheffield, operated by Northern Trains, with generally an hourly service in each direction.

=== Bus ===
Mexborough Interchange

General information
- Location: A6023 Greens Way, Mexborough town centre Doncaster (S64 9HS); England
- Owner: South Yorkshire Passenger Transport Executive
- Operator: South Yorkshire Passenger Transport Executive
- Bus stands: 7
- Bus operators: Globe Coaches, Stagecoach Yorkshire

Construction
- Parking: Yes
- Cycle facilities: Yes
- Accessible: Yes
Location

Mexborough also has a bus station in the town centre, Mexborough Interchange, operated by Travel South Yorkshire. The Interchange is located between the A6023 Greens Way dual carriageway, John Street, Main Street and Hartley Street, around 100 m (330 ft) from Mexborough High Street and 500 m (1,600 ft) on foot from Mexborough railway station.

The bus station consists of three stands (numbered A1–A3) located in a bus-only lay-by on the northern side of the eastbound carriageway of Greens Way, a single stand (numbered B1) at a right angle to these accessed from John Street, and three stands (numbered HS1–HS3) situated a short distance away at the side of Hartley Street. The three sets of stands are in close proximity, linked by car parks and pathways. The majority of bus routes traverse Mexborough town centre on a one-way loop, with the Greens Way stops serving routes heading generally eastbound towards Doncaster and the Hartley Street stops serving westbound services towards Barnsley and Rotherham.

Mexborough Interchange was built by the South Yorkshire Passenger Transport Executive in the early 1990s, replacing bus stops in both directions on the High Street which was subsequently pedestrianised. When the Interchange first opened, there was a staffed ticket office and indoor waiting area with toilet facilities located in a small building between the Greens Way stands and John Street. However, around the time of the beginning of the Great Recession, the staffed ticket office was closed and all facilities inside were sealed off as an austerity measure. As of October 2022, the stand allocation is:

Stand	Route	Destination
A1	X20	Doncaster via Conisbrough and Warmsworth (Globe Coaches)
A2	221	Doncaster via Denaby Main and Conisbrough (Stagecoach)
A3	208	Grimethorpe via Bolton-upon-Dearne, Goldthorpe and Billingley (Stagecoach)
A3	218, 218a	Barnsley via Manvers, Bolton-upon-Dearne, Goldthorpe and Darfield (Stagecoach)
B1	–	no services allocated
HS1	–	no services allocated
HS2	208	Rotherham via Swinton, Warren Vale and Rawmarsh (Stagecoach)
HS2	221	Rotherham via Swinton and Rawmarsh (Stagecoach)
HS3	218, 218a	Rotherham via Swinton, Kilnhurst and Rawmarsh (Stagecoach)
HS3	X20	Barnsley via Manvers, Old Moor and Wombwell (Globe Coaches)

== Education ==
Mexborough has one secondary school (Laurel Academy) and many primary schools.

== Media ==
Local news and television programmes are provided by BBC Yorkshire and ITV Yorkshire. Television signals are received from the Emley Moor TV transmitter.

Local radio stations are BBC Radio Sheffield, Heart Yorkshire, Capital Yorkshire, Greatest Hits Radio Yorkshire (formerly Trax FM), Hits Radio South Yorkshire (formerly Hallam FM), and both Doncaster Radio and Rotherham Radio community based stations which broadcast from Mexborough.

The town is served by the local newspapers, Dearne Valley Weekender and Doncaster Free Press.

== Sport ==
Mexborough has been represented in the FA Cup by four different football teams – Mexborough Locomotive Works, Mexborough St. Johns, Mexborough West End and Mexborough Town.

The last of the four was the most prominent and won the Yorkshire Football League in 1973.

== Notable people ==
- Keith Barron – actor
- Walter Bennett – footballer, Sheffield United & Bristol City
- Brian Blessed – actor
- Eric Brook – footballer
- Sally Carman – actress
- Dan Clarke – motor racing driver formerly driving for Minardi Team USA in the Champ Car World Series
- Katie Edwards – writer
- Albert Fox – trade unionist
- William Hackett – Royal Engineers tunneller, awarded the Victoria Cross 1916
- William 'Iron' Hague – British heavyweight boxing champion 1908–11
- Kenneth Haigh – actor
- Mike Hawthorn – motor-racing driver and 1958 Formula 1 World Champion
- Ted Hughes – Poet Laureate, 1984–98
- Peter Kitchen – professional footballer
- Harold Massingham – poet
- Ian Parks – poet
- Dennis Priestley – professional darts player, twice world darts champion 1991 and 1994
- Geoff Salmons, professional footballer, most notably with Sheffield United
- Lionel Smith (born 23 August 1920) – professional footballer, for Mexborough Albion and Denaby United before making 162 appearances for Arsenal
- Karen Walker – footballer, played for England, Doncaster Belles and Leeds United
- Donald Watson – founder of The Vegan Society
- John William Wall (pen name Sarban) – author whose works include the novel The Sound of His Horn and the collection Ringstones

== See also ==
- Earl of Mexborough
- Listed buildings in Mexborough
