= List of schools in Doncaster =

This is a list of schools in the Metropolitan Borough of Doncaster in the English county of South Yorkshire.

== State funded schools ==
=== Primary schools ===
- Adwick Primary School, Woodlands
- Arksey Primary School, Arksey
- Armthorpe Shaw Wood Academy, Armthorpe
- Askern Littlemoor Infant Academy, Askern
- Askern Moss Road Infant Academy, Askern
- Atlas Academy, Doncaster Town Centre
- Auckley School, Auckley
- Balby Central Primary Academy, Balby
- Barnburgh Primary School, Barnburgh
- Barnby Dun Primary Academy, Barnby Dun
- Bawtry Mayflower Primary School, Bawtry
- Bentley High Street Primary School, Bentley
- Bentley New Village Primary School, Bentley
- Bessacarr Primary, Bessacarr
- Branton St Wilfrid's CE Primary School, Branton
- Brooke Primary Academy, Thorne
- Canon Popham CE Primary Academy, Edenthorpe
- Carcroft Primary School, Carcroft
- Carr Lodge Academy, Balby
- Castle Academy, Conisbrough
- Conisbrough Ivanhoe Primary Academy, Conisbrough
- Copley Junior School, Sprotbrough
- Crookesbroom Primary Academy, Hatfield
- Denaby Main Primary Academy, Denaby Main
- Dunsville Primary School, Dunsville
- Edenthorpe Hall Primary Academy, Edenthorpe
- Edlington Victoria Academy, Edlington
- Grange Lane Infant Academy, Rossington
- Green Top School, Thorne
- Hatchell Wood Primary Academy, Bessacarr
- Hatfield Woodhouse Primary School, Hatfield Woodhouse
- Hawthorn Primary School, Cantley
- Hayfield Lane Primary School, Auckley
- Hexthorpe Primary School, Hexthorpe
- Highfields Primary School, Highfields
- Highwoods Academy, Mexborough
- Hill Top Academy, Edlington
- Holy Family RC Primary School, Stainforth
- Hooton Pagnell All Saints CE Primary School, Hooton Pagnell
- Intake Primary Academy, Intake
- King Edward Primary School, Thorne
- Kingfisher Primary Academy, Wheatley
- Kirk Sandall Infant School, Kirk Sandall
- Kirk Sandall Junior School, Kirk Sandall
- Kirkby Avenue Primary School, Bentley
- Lakeside Primary Academy, Doncaster Town Centre
- Long Toft Primary School, Stainforth
- Mallard Primary School, Balby
- Marshland Primary Academy, Moorends
- Mexborough St John the Baptist CE Primary School, Mexborough
- Montagu Academy, Mexborough
- Morley Place Academy, Conisbrough
- New Pastures Primary School, Mexborough
- Norton Infant School, Norton
- Norton Junior School, Norton
- Our Lady Of Mount Carmel RC Primary School, Intake
- Our Lady Of Perpetual Help RC Primary School, Bentley
- Our Lady of Sorrows RC Voluntary Academy, Armthorpe
- Outwood Primary Academy Woodlands, Woodlands
- Owston Park Primary Academy, Skellow
- Park Primary School, Wheatley
- Pheasant Bank Academy, Rossington
- Plover Primary School, Intake
- Richmond Hill Primary Academy, Sprotbrough
- Rosedale Primary School, Scawsby
- Rossington St Michaels CE Primary School, Rossington
- Rossington Tornedale Infant School, Rossington
- Rowena Academy, Conisbrough
- St Alban's RC Primary School, Denaby Main
- St Francis Xavier RC Primary School, Balby
- St Joseph and St Teresa's RC Primary School, Woodlands
- St Joseph's RC School, Rossington
- St Mary's RC Primary School, Edlington
- St Oswald's CE Academy, Finningley
- St Peter's RC Primary School, Belle Vue
- Saltersgate Infant School, Scawsby
- Sandringham Primary School, Intake
- Scawsby Junior Academy, Scawsby
- Scawthorpe Castle Hills Primary Academy, Scawthorpe
- Scawthorpe Sunnyfields Primary School, Scawthorpe
- Sheep Dip Lane Academy, Dunscroft
- Southfield Primary, Armthorpe
- Spa Academy Askern, Askern
- Sprotbrough Orchard Infant School, Sprotbrough
- Stainforth Kirton Lane Primary School, Stainforth
- Tickhill Estfeld Primary School, Tickhill
- Tickhill St Mary's CE Primary School, Tickhill
- Toll Bar Primary School, Toll Bar
- Town Field Primary School, Doncaster Town Centre
- Tranmoor Primary, Armthorpe
- Travis St Lawrence CE Primary School, Hatfield
- Wadworth Primary School, Wadworth
- Warmsworth Primary School, Warmsworth
- Waverley Academy, Balby
- West Road Primary Academy, Moorends
- Willow Primary School, Bessacarr
- Windhill Primary School, Mexborough
- Woodfield Primary School, Balby

=== Secondary schools ===
- The Armthorpe Academy, Armthorpe
- Ash Hill Academy, Hatfield
- Astrea Academy Woodfields, Balby
- Campsmount Academy, Norton
- De Warenne Academy, Conisbrough
- Don Valley Academy, Scawthorpe
- Doncaster UTC, Doncaster Town Centre
- Hall Cross Academy, Doncaster Town Centre
- The Hayfield School, Auckley
- Hungerhill School, Edenthorpe
- The Laurel Academy, Mexborough
- The McAuley Catholic High School, Cantley
- Outwood Academy Adwick, Woodlands
- Outwood Academy Danum, Intake
- Ridgewood School, Scawsby
- Rossington All Saints Academy, Rossington
- Sir Thomas Wharton Academy, Edlington
- Trinity Academy, Thorne
- XP East, Belle Vue
- XP School, Belle Vue

=== Special and alternative schools ===
- Bader Academy, Edenthorpe
- Coppice School, Hatfield
- Heatherwood School, Wheatley Hills
- The Levett School, Sprotborough
- Maple Medical PRU, Balby
- North Ridge Community School, Adwick le Street
- Pennine View School, Conisbrough
- St Wilfrid's Academy, Bessacarr
- Stone Hill School, Scawsby

=== Further education ===
- Doncaster College
- Doncaster Collegiate Sixth Form
- New College Doncaster

== Independent schools ==
=== Primary and preparatory schools ===
- Sycamore Hall Preparatory School, Balby

=== Senior and all-through schools ===
- Hill House School, Auckley

=== Special and alternative schools ===
- Doncaster School for the Deaf, Doncaster Town Centre
- Field Gate School, Fishlake
- Fullerton House School, Denaby
- More Than Ed Independent Special School, Balby
- North Bridge Enterprise College, Doncaster Town Centre
