= Finningley railway station =

Former railway station in South Yorkshire, England

Finningley
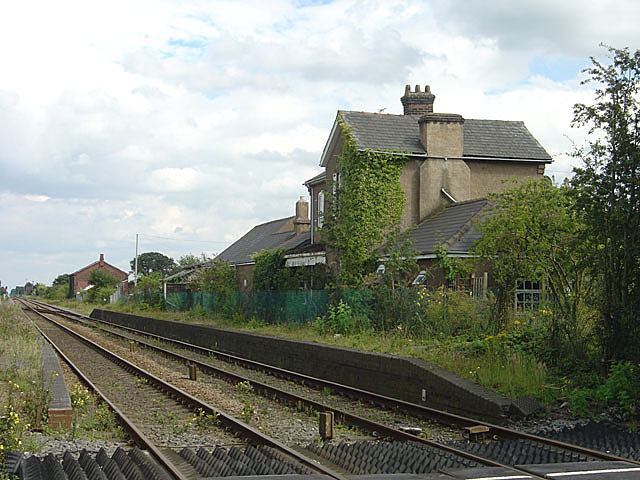

General information
- Location: Finningley and Blaxton, Doncaster; England
- Coordinates: 53.49064°N 0.99014°W
- Grid reference: SK670997
- Platforms: 2

Other information
- Status: Disused

History
- Pre-grouping: Great Northern and Great Eastern Joint Railway
- Post-grouping: London and North Eastern Railway; British Railways

Key dates
- 15 July 1867: opened
- 11 September 1961: closed for regular passenger service
- 6 September 1965: closed completely
Location

Finningley railway station was a railway station built to serve the villages of Finningley and Blaxton, South Yorkshire, England.

== History ==
The first railway station to be built was some 500 yards (460 m) to the west of the level crossing on the main Bawtry to Thorne road (A614). The second station, still in South Yorkshire, was on the east of the level crossing, some 2 miles (3 km) west of the county boundary. It was located on the Doncaster to Lincoln Line approximately 1 mile (1.6 km) from RAF Finningley (now Doncaster Sheffield Airport). Although the station closed to passengers on 11 September 1961 it was opened specially for trains from Doncaster to the Finningley Air Show until 1965 and on one occasion to serve the Royal Train when H.M. The Queen visited the Royal Air Force airfield.

Nowadays only the derelict platforms remain, along with the former station buildings (which are a private residence) and the signal box, which remains in use to operate the adjacent level crossing.

== Future ==
Planning permission for a new station further north to serve the airport was granted by Doncaster Council in 2008 and discussions regarding station design and service levels took place between the local authority, Network Rail and the various TOCs with a view to opening the new station in 2012. However, there was no progress on building a new station by June 2016. A 2012 report by Network Rail stated that more trains on the line would be required to make the station viable. The service over the line was sparse, with just five Doncaster to Lincoln Central trains each way from Monday to Saturday in the May 2017 timetable. There has been a call from Sheffield Chamber of Commerce to provide a rail link to the Doncaster Sheffield airport and a new railway station for the air terminal.

The council applied for the station in the New Stations Fund 2 in 2017 but was unsuccessful.

Preceding station	Historical railways	Following station
Bessacarr; Line open, station closed	Great Northern and Great Eastern Joint	Park Drain; Line open, station closed
