= Ash Hill Academy =

Ash Hill Academy - Delta Academies Trust

Location
- Ash Hill Road; Hatfield, South Yorkshire, DN7 6JH; England; 53.57520°N 1.00814°W

Information
- Type: Academy
- Department for Education URN: 137066 Tables
- Ofsted: Reports
- Head teacher: Matt Hicks
- Gender: Coeducational
- Age: 11 to 16
- Enrolment: 820
- Website: http://www.ashhillacademy.org.uk/

Ash Hill Academy (formerly Hatfield Visual Arts College) is a coeducational secondary school with academy status, at Hatfield, South Yorkshire, England.

The school is based at Ash Hill Road, between Hatfield and Dunscroft, to the east of Doncaster near the A18 and M18. It educates 11- to 16-year-olds from the areas of Hatfield, Stainforth, Dunsville, Dunscroft, Hatfield Woodhouse and teenagers from other regions of Doncaster. The site is shared with Coppice School, a school for pupils with learning difficulties from ages 3–18.

== History ==
The school is situated in a former coal mining area, and was first known as Hatfield High School. In 1997 arson destroyed the science block and former year 7 and 8 classrooms of the annexed Ash Hill Middle School. Another fire in November 2001 caused £750,000 of damage to the front building, destroying the main hall and eighteen classrooms, including computer equipment the school had recently obtained in the Foundation IT building. Seven fire engines attended.

Ash Hill became an Arts College in 2003 and was renamed Hatfield Visual Arts College. A new Arts and Maths building, the Da Vinci Learning Centre, was opened on 26 January 2007 by Alan Johnson. The school converted to academy status in September 2011 and was renamed Ash Hill Academy. It has a history of performing arts, which includes a wind band and choirs. A school pantomime and other performances take place throughout the year.

On 16 December 2009 the school ended mixed-year form classes, the forms now separated into year groups. The school's last Ofsted inspection in June 2011 reported the school as having made good progress, whereby it was taken out of the special measures imposed 18 months previously.

The school's former high level of truancy has been curbed by keeping pupils in at lunchtime, more police patrols, and electronic registration at the beginning of lessons. A fingerprint system is used for taking books from the library.

== Academic performance ==
Students can study for GCSE, BTEC or A level qualifications. Despite improvement, the school receives low GCSE results, just above the national minimum, but about average for Doncaster LEA. Results at A Level are also low. Only five of Doncaster's seventeen secondary schools get GCSE results over the national average. The LEA intends six schools to become academies.

== Doncaster Collegiate Sixth Form ==
The school was part of the Doncaster Collegiate Sixth Form which combined the sixth form offering from Ash Hill Academy, De Warenne Academy, Don Valley Academy, Rossington All Saints Academy and Serlby Park Academy.
