= Higher School Certificate =

Higher School Certificate may refer to:

- Higher Secondary Certificate, a certificate given after successfully completing at least twelve years (grade 12) of schooling in Bangladesh, India, and Pakistan
- Higher School Certificate (Mauritius), a secondary school leaving qualification in Mauritius
- Higher School Certificate (New South Wales), a secondary school credential in New South Wales, Australia
- Higher School Certificate (England and Wales), an examination in England, Wales, and Northern Ireland, replaced by the A-level
- Higher School Certificate (Victoria), a qualification awarded in Victoria, Australia until 1986
- Malaysian Higher School Certificate

== See also ==
- School Certificate (disambiguation)
- Intermediate Certificate (disambiguation)
- Matriculation Certificate (disambiguation)
- Secondary Education Examination (disambiguation)
- Secondary School Certificate (SSC), grade 10 certificates in the Indian subcontinent
  - Secondary School Leaving Certificate, a grade 10 certificate in India
  - High School Leaving Certificate (India), a grade 10 certificate in India
- List of secondary school leaving qualifications
