= Hill House School, South Yorkshire =

Independent school in Auckley, South Yorkshire, England

Hill House School

Location
- Sixth Avenue, Auckley, South Yorkshire, DN9 3GG; England; 53.486408°N 1.014894°W

Information
- Type: Private day school
- Motto: Sapientia et Doctrina
- Established: 1912
- Founder: Reginald Master
- Headmaster: David Holland
- Staff: 80 (approx.)
- Gender: Co-educational
- Age: 3 to 18
- Enrolment: 875
- Colour: Navy
- Website: hillhouse.doncaster.sch.uk

Hill House School is a co-educational independent day school for pupils from the ages of 3 to 18 in South Yorkshire, England. In 2012, Hill House was named 'independent school of the Year' at the independent school awards. It is a member of the Headmasters' and Headmistresses' Conference, The Independent Association of Preparatory Schools, and the Independent Schools Council.

== Early history ==
Hill House School was founded in Doncaster as a preparatory school for boys in 1912 by Reginald Master. In 1959, Paula Haigh, the wife of the then Headmaster of Hill House School, Mr Hamilton Haigh, founded St Mary's School on Bawtry Road as a girls' school. In the early 1970s under a new head, Hill House began to accept girls, and by the early 1980s had become fully co-educational.

Hill House St Mary's School was born when the two schools merged in August 2002, with primary-age children being taught at the Rutland Street site, overlooking Doncaster's Town Fields, and with secondary-age children taught at the St Mary's site on Bawtry Road.

== Recent history ==
In September 2008, Hill House School, reverting to its former name, relocated to the Officers’ Quarters of former RAF Finningley, previous home to Britain's Vulcan bombers, adjacent to the modern Robin Hood Airport. In an £8 million project, led by Cadman Construction, the school now has numerous purpose-built classrooms allied to historic function rooms.

In September 2011, Hill House opened its new Sixth Form and Music School in a £1.1 million development, and was accepted into membership of the Society of Heads.

Since 2010, Hill House has been home to the Robin Hood Music and Drama Festival, which takes place in April each year. In 2012, the school acquired 54 acres of land in nearby Blaxton, which has been developed into sports grounds.

In September 2015, the school's Paver Astroturf Hockey Pitch was opened by Olympic Gold Medallist Imran Sherwani, and in April 2017, the school's new Dining Hall was opened.

In August 2021, the school celebrated record examination results and Oxbridge admissions.

In February 2023, the school's new £1 million sports pavilion was opened at Blaxton Sports Grounds by the international netball player Tracey Neville.

In November 2024, the school opened New Court, including its Art School, Music School, Mathematics Department and Fitness Centre.

In December 2024, Hill House was named 'Independent Secondary School of the Year, North' for 2025 by the Sunday Times.

== Catchment ==
The main catchment area includes Tickhill, Bawtry, Epworth, Doncaster, Rotherham, Howden, Selby, Pontefract, Retford & Worksop, all of which are served by school transport.

== Houses ==
The School has 4 Houses, School (Blue), Master (Red), Field (Green) and New (Purple)

== Awards ==
- 2012–13 Times Independent School of the Year; Winner
- 2012–13 Times Outstanding Strategic Initiative Award: Winner
- 2012–13 Times Outstanding Governing Body Award; Shortlist
- 2016–17 Times Outstanding Community Initiative Award; Winner
- 2021–22 Independent School of the Year for Sport; Shortlist
- 2023–24 Classic FM Music Teacher of the Year; Shortlist
- 2023–24 Education Business Awards; Shortlist
- 2024–25 Sunday Times Independent Secondary School of the Year, North

== Successes ==
- 2016–17 North of England Hockey Champions, 5th in National Finals, at U13 Girls
- 2017–18 North of England Hockey Runners-up, 7th in National Finals, at U14 Girls
- 2021–22 North of England Tier 4 Hockey Champions at U18 Girls
- 2021–22 National Tier 4 Hockey Runners Up at U18 Girls
- 2021–22 U16 Boys Rugby Yorkshire Cup Winners
- 2021–22 U15 Boys England National Rugby Bowl Winners
- 2022–23 North of England Tier 4 Hockey Champions at U18 Girls
- 2022–23 National Schools' Rugby Sevens Champions at U14 Girls
- 2023–24 Yorkshire and North East Tier 3 Hockey Champions at U14 Girls
- 2024–25 National Tier 2 Hockey Runners Up at U16 Girls.
- 2024-25 National Schools' Rugby Sevens Champions at U16 Girls
- 2025-26 North of England Tier 2 Champions at U14 Girls
- 2025-26 North of England Tier 2 Champions at U14 Boys

== Notable former pupils ==
- Jeremy Clarkson, author, journalist and television presenter
- Emma Chambers, actress
- Rosie Winterton, Member of Parliament
- Philip Davies, Member of Parliament
- Richard Dawson, England cricketer; Gloucestershire Cricket Club head coach
- Michael Hills, rugby player (England U21 + 7s: Sale, London Welsh, & Doncaster (Captain))
- Robert Hannigan, civil servant, director of GCHQ
- John Craig Lawrence, director of joint warfare in the Joint Forces Command, author, historian
- Hannah Cain, professional footballer with Wales and Leicester City W.F.C
- Francis Hodder, first-class cricketer, rugby union player and Royal Air Force officer
- Sally Jameson, Member of Parliament
