= School Certificate =

A school certificate is typically a certificate awarded for completion of certain schooling years.

It may refer to one of the following qualifications:

- School Certificate (New South Wales), discontinued 2011
- School Certificate (United Kingdom), 1918-1951
- School Certificate (New Zealand), 1940s-2002
- School Certificate (Mauritius), still awarded

== See also ==
- Higher School Certificate (disambiguation), list of similar qualifications
- Intermediate Certificate (disambiguation)
- Matriculation Certificate (disambiguation)
- Secondary School Certificate (SSC), grade 10 certificates in the Indian subcontinent
  - Secondary School Leaving Certificate, a grade 10 certificate in India
  - High School Leaving Certificate (India), a grade 10 certificate in India
- Higher Secondary Certificate (HSC), grade 12 certificate in India
- List of secondary school leaving qualifications
