= Doncaster Sheffield Airport railway station =

Proposed railway station in England

Doncaster Sheffield Airport
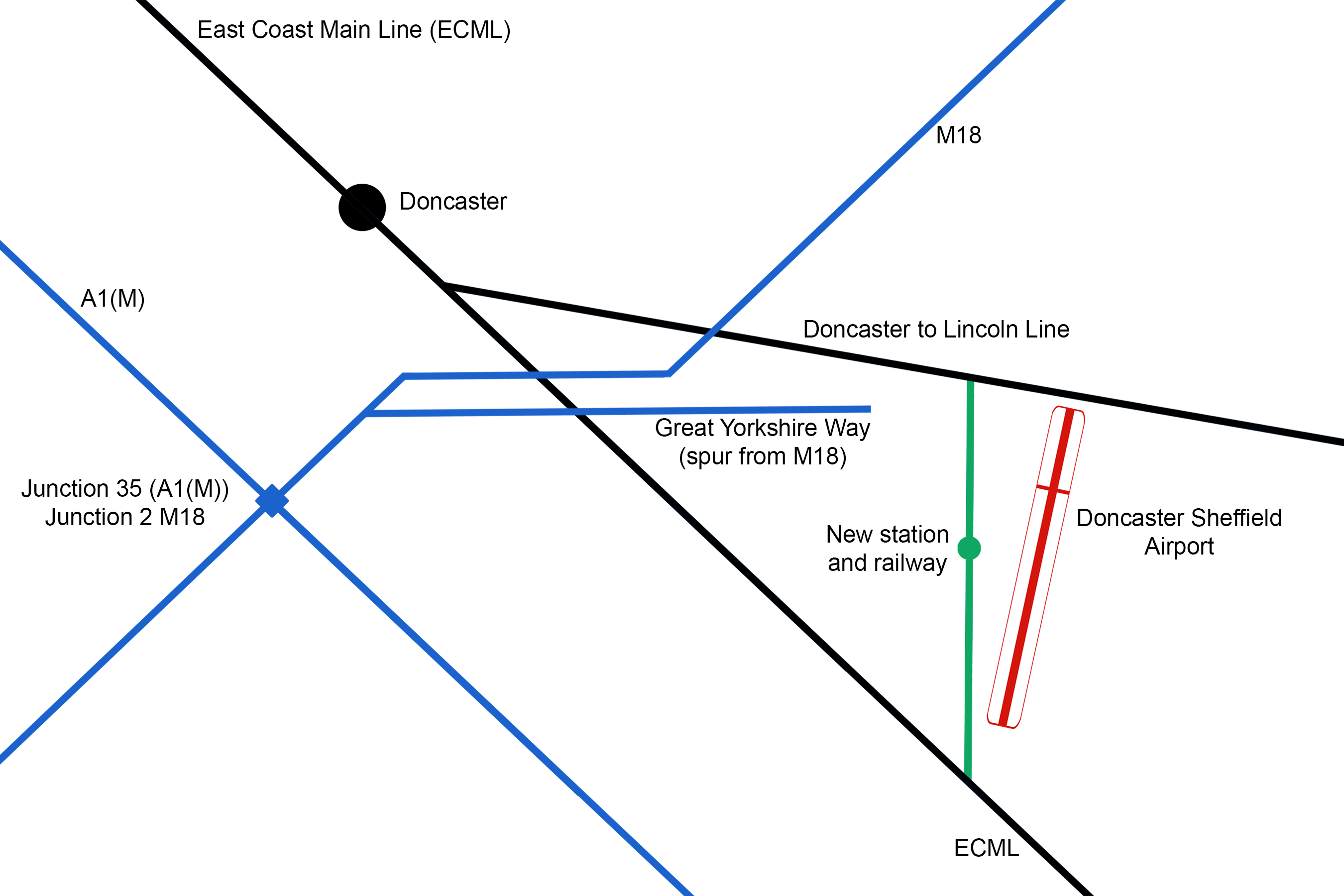
- Map of the area with new line shown in green Not to scale Not all railway lines shown

General information
- Location: England
- Coordinates: 53°28′40″N 1°01′07″W
- Grid reference: SK651984

Doncaster Sheffield Airport railway station (also known as Aerotropolis) is a proposed railway station in the Doncaster Sheffield Airport (DSA) terminal area to allow an interchange of services between rail and air. The area used to have a railway station called Finningley to the north-east of the airfield, and was used by personnel from the former Royal Air Force base that the airport is sited on (RAF Finningley). However, the proposed station would have been a new-build facility on a new section of railway connecting the airport with the East Coast Main Line (ECML).

== History ==
A railway station was opened up at Finningley in 1867 on the Doncaster-Lincoln line. It was closed in 1961, but used sporadically over the next twenty years to bring people to RAF Finningley's annual airshow.

The airport was opened up to civilian traffic in 1996 when the Royal Air Force left. Reopening the former railway station at Finningley on the Doncaster–Lincoln line was mooted before DSA proposed a new build railway in late 2016, with formal talks with Network Rail being held in 2017. The plan would be to build a new section of railway looping southwards off the Doncaster–Lincoln Line, heading through the airport estate and joining up with the East Coast Main Line south of the airfield boundary. The line would stretch for 4.5 miles (7.2 km) but would require 7 miles (11 km) of new line with junctions at both ends. Initial costings placed the scheme at £100 million, but by 2018, a more detailed estimate was given as £170 million for the station and £280 million for all the works including "unexpected circumstances". By 2020, the estimated cost was £300 million as a flyover junction would be needed at the southern end of the spur at Bawtry.

With ancillary works and new housing, the project is believed to be able to generate 73,000 jobs in the local community, and the whole linked project was described in the press as being Aerotropolis. Doncaster Sheffield Airport, Sheffield City Region Local Enterprise Partnership and Doncaster Council all joint funded a 2017 feasibility study into the link proposal and it has gained popular support from the business community and local MPs. In August 2018 Peel Airports Group revealed that over 90% of those who had been polled in a public consultation were in favour of the project.

In the vision for the new station and diversion, the airport envisages six services through station per hour from several operators both national and local. This would put 9 million people within 90 minutes of the airport which would allow people living as far south as Stevenage and Welwyn to access the airport at Doncaster faster than either Heathrow or Gatwick. Network Rail (NR) included the proposal in their 2017 East Coast Main Line route study. NR said that any connection to the main line would have to be timetabled in such a way that it did not conflict with existing main line services. The station is also being proposed as a starting point for local businesses and the Yorkshire Wildlife Park.

If the diversion and station did not go ahead as planned, the airport had devised a back-up plan for a community railway station on the former Finningley railway station site. This plan was first published in 2008 and would require an upgrade to the services on the Doncaster–Lincoln Line.

== Funding ==
In October 2020, the UK Government refused the business case for the project. A Department for Transport spokesperson said that "On the basis of a rigorous assessment, there were significant concerns regarding the current proposal but we remain committed to improving connectivity to Doncaster Sheffield Airport." In November 2022, Doncaster Sheffield Airport closed.

In April 2025, The City of Doncaster Council has announced the masterplan for Doncaster Sheffield Airport along with proposals for the rail link. It is dedicated as part of the masterplan to reopen the airport where British PM Keir Starmer has pledged £30 million back in February.
