= Park Drain railway station =

Former railway station in Nottinghamshire, England

Park Drain
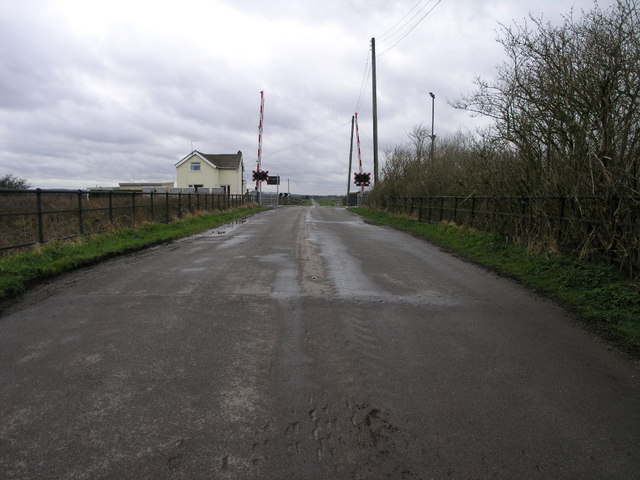
- The former Park Drain Hotel, and Park Drain level crossing. The station was behind the hotel.

General information
- Location: England
- Coordinates: 53.47949°N 0.90813°W
- Platforms: 2

Other information
- Status: Disused

History
- Pre-grouping: Great Northern and Great Eastern Joint Railway

Key dates
- 2 March 1896: opened
- 7 February 1955: closed to passengers
- 6 April 1964: closed for freight
Location

Park Drain was a railway station in Nottinghamshire, close to the border with Lincolnshire. It was on the line between Gainsborough and Doncaster. It closed in 1955 to passengers, and completely in 1964, although the line on which it was located remains open.

== History ==
The Great Northern Railway had been attempting to build a connecting line between Gainsborough and Doncaster since 1847, but it was not until they obtained an Act of Parliament on 25 July 1864 that they were at last empowered to do so. Some three years later, the line opened, for freight on 1 July 1867, and for passengers on 15 July. In order to keep it virtually level, with a maximum gradient of 1 in 300, some large earthworks had been constructed. Intermediate stations were initially at Beckingham, Walkeringham, Misterton, Haxey, and Finningley. Park Drain was not considered, as there was no obvious population for it to serve. The site was located by a level crossing on the no-through road running from Idle Stop, a remote location on the north bank of the River Idle, to the Haxey to Blaxton Road. The tracks ran along the south bank of a Warping Drain, which was joined by the Snow Sewer to the east of the site. The line here ran in an east to west direction, and by 1886 there was a trailing siding to the east of the crossing, on the south side of the tracks, and another to the west on the north side of the tracks. There were shorter sidings on the south side to the west of the crossing. The 1886 map labels the site Park Drain Sidings, and makes no mention of the station.

A passenger station opened on 2 March 1896, and the 1899 map shows two platforms to the east of the level crossing. Two buildings had appeared just to the north, on the other side of the Warping Drain to the station. The station and the buildings were only just in Nottinghamshire, as the county border with Lincolnshire ran diagonally across the countryside, crossing the railway about halfway along the eastern siding. The building nearest the road was the Park Drain Hotel, which was completed in 1899 by George Dunston, a local colliery proprietor and mining engineer. He had obtained a licence to serve alcohol in 1897, before construction had begun, which was granted on the basis that Park Drain would soon be the centre of an extensive coal mining operation. Coal had first been discovered in the vicinity when exploratory drilling had taken place at Idle Stop in 1893. Two seams were found, at depths of 3,142 feet (958 m) and 3,185 feet (971 m), A newspaper report of a dinner held by Dunston at the hotel in 1899 noted that the station served the people of Westwoodside, but that the hotel stood in a remote location, with only some railway men's cottages and a signal box nearby. It is unclear whether the station was in full operation at that time, since Dunston, in a speech which outlined plans for a mine and a large village or small town near the hotel, also mentioned that a number of his friends were missing from the dinner because the railway company would not stop the train on which they were travelling at Park Drain. The scheme to open a mine foundered when the First World War began, and there were also issues with drainage. Despite its isolated location, the hotel flourished until the 1990s, when it closed, and in 2003 the building was re-used as offices.

In 1925 a signal box was constructed at the site, using a Great Northern Railway design dating from 1907. It contained a Saxby & Farmer lever frame, which was clearly second-hand, as it was much older than the building. The box ceased to be used on 5 December 1977.

Former Services

Preceding station	Disused railways	Following station
Finningley	LNE Railway; Axholme Joint Railway	Haxey Junction
Finningley	Great Northern and Great Eastern Joint Railway; Doncaster-Gainsborough Line	Haxey & Epworth

== Bibliography ==
- Butt, R V J (1995). The Directory of Railway Station. Patrick Stephens. ISBN 978-1-85260-508-7.
- Gibson, Walcot (1913). The concealed coalfield of Yorkshire and Nottinghamshire. His Majesty's Stationery Office.
- Wrottesley, John (1979). The Great Northern Railway: Volume I: Origins and Development. London: B T Batsford. ISBN 978-0-7134-1590-2.
