= Matriculation =

Entering a university

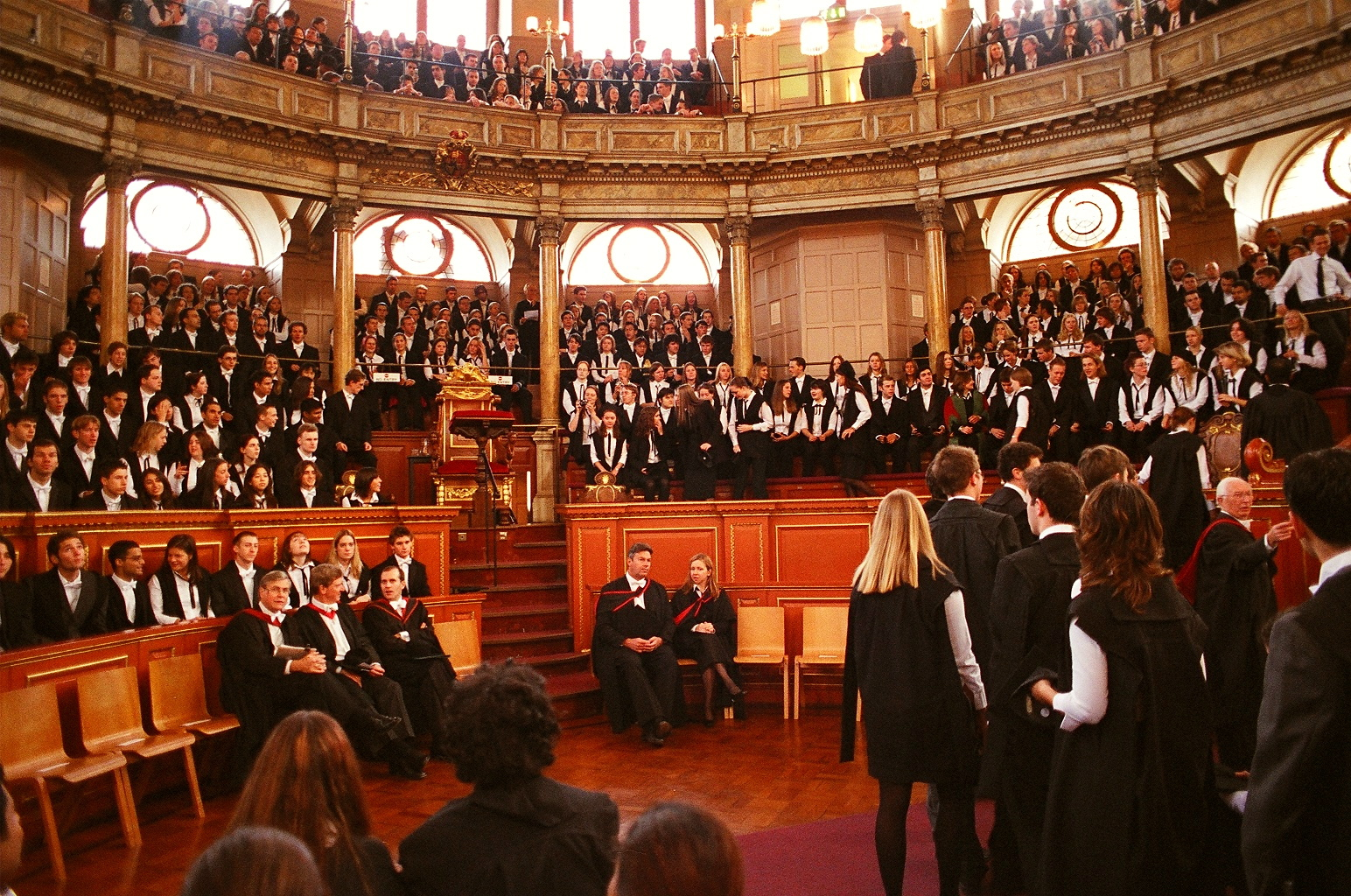
Students arriving for a matriculation ceremony at the Sheldonian Theatre, Oxford, UK

Matriculation is the formal process of entering a university. In some universities this is associated with a formal ceremony, which may be known as matriculation or convocation.

== Australia ==
In Australia, some Catholic university colleges have reintroduced matriculation ceremonies. New students at the College of St John the Evangelist within the University of Sydney and new students at Campion College Australia sign the college register during a formal ceremony whilst wearing academic dress.

== Canada ==
In Canada, some universities, including the University of King's College, still hold formal matriculation ceremonies. The ceremony at King's is quite similar to the matriculation ceremonies held in universities such as Oxford or Cambridge. Trinity College at the University of Toronto also holds formal matriculation ceremonies, during which incoming students are required to sign a matriculation register, making the practice the closest in format to that conducted by Oxford and Cambridge colleges of any university in North America. "F!rosh Week" at the University of Toronto's Faculty of Applied Science and Engineering also begins with a distinct matriculation ceremony held at the university's Convocation Hall; though, there is no matriculation register to be signed, and the event is held by the student-run University of Toronto Engineering Society (through their Orientation Committee) rather than officially by the faculty. It is also where first-year engineering students take the "Hardhat Oath," a modified version of the Rifleman's Creed. At McGill University in Montreal, matriculation ceremonies have been substantially stripped down since the 1990s, although a speech by the Principal, typically held at Molson Stadium, to the incoming class is still a ritualized annual tradition.

== Czech Republic ==
At Charles University in Prague, the oldest and most prestigious university in the Czech Republic, matriculation is held at the Great Hall (Magna Aula). The ceremony is attended by students commencing their studies. It is intended as a demonstration of the adoption of student's duties and obtaining of student's rights. The ceremony itself involves students taking the Matriculation Oath of the university and symbolically touching the faculty mace and shaking the dean's hand.

Other Czech universities hold ceremonies similar to the one just described.

== Denmark ==
In Denmark, the University of Copenhagen holds a matriculation ceremony each year. The ceremony is held in the Hall of Ceremony in the main building of the university. The ceremony begins with a procession with the rector and the deans in academic dress and other regalia. The ceremony continues with the rector listing the different faculties, after which the different student, shouts when their respective faculty is mentioned. The rector then delivers a speech, after which the rector and the deans leave the ceremony again in procession, after which a party is held on university grounds, to mark the admission of the new students.

== Germany ==
The German term Immatrikulation describes the administrative process of enrolling at a university as a student. This can happen for the winter semester and, depending on the degree program, also for the summer semester. It does not involve a ceremony. A prerequisite for matriculation is generally the Abitur, which is the standard matriculation examination in Germany, for regular universities and Fachhochschulreife for Fachhochschulen (Universities of Applied Sciences). Both Abitur and Fachhochschulreife are school leaving certificates which students receive after passing their final examinations at some types of German secondary schools.

== United Kingdom ==
Matriculation ceremonies are held at Durham University, Lincoln Bishop University, the University of Oxford and the Royal Agricultural University, at which new students are entered into the register (Latin: matricula) of the university and become members of the university. Oxford requires matriculating students to wear sub fusc (including a gown) for the ceremony, which is held at the Sheldonian Theatre. At Durham, ceremonies are held by college at Durham Cathedral. The wearing of gowns is determined by the colleges and the register is signed by one undergraduate and one postgraduate student from each college on behalf of all of the students. At Lincoln Bishop University, ceremonies are held at Lincoln Cathedral. All matriculating students wear gowns and the register is signed by the registrar on behalf of the university. At the Royal Agricultural University, ceremonies are held at the local parish church and all matriculating students wear gowns.

At most British universities, there is no formal ceremony and students become a member of the university by registering. The registration process is called matriculation at some universities, including Cambridge, Edinburgh and St Andrews. At Cambridge, there is a college register in addition to the university register (which is signed electronically), and colleges may hold matriculation ceremonies around the signing of their register. The wearing of gowns for these ceremonies depends on the college. Some universities, such as Edinburgh and St Andrews, hold a "welcome ceremony" or "opening ceremony" for new students that is separate from matriculation.

== United States ==
At most universities and colleges in the United States, matriculation refers to mere enrollment or registration as a student at a university or college by a student intending to earn a degree, an event which involves no special ceremony.

Some colleges that have a formal matriculation ceremony call it as such, while others call this enrollment ceremony for new students a "convocation". A few colleges, such as Trinity College in Connecticut, use both terms, referring to the gathering as a convocation and the formal signing in as a student as the matriculation.

At some institutions, these ceremonies are relatively new. Scripps College's matriculation began only in 1990. Others, like those at Trinity College, are nearly two centuries old, first occurring in 1826.

Colleges that specifically have a "matriculation" ceremony and specifically use this name include: Adrian College, Albion College, Assumption College, Belmont University, Boston College, Boston University, The Citadel, Culver-Stockton College, Dartmouth College, Duquesne University,Jacksonville University, Kenyon College, Lawrence University, Lyon College, Marietta College, McKendree University, Mount Union College, Moravian College, Muhlenberg College, Randolph-Macon College, Rice University, Saint Lawrence University, Scripps College, Trinity College, Tufts University, the University of Saint Mary (Kansas), Virginia Military Institute, Wabash College, Walsh University, Washington and Jefferson College, and Willamette University.

Many medical schools highlight matriculation with a white coat ceremony. This is a relatively recent phenomenon, originating at the University of Chicago's Pritzker School of Medicine in 1989. The first full-fledged ceremony was at the Columbia University's Vagelos College of Physicians and Surgeons in 1993.

=== Special student ===
Universities and colleges in the United States commonly have a category of students known as special students, non-matriculated students or non-matriculating students. Generally these are students who are not merely auditing a class, but receive credit which is potentially transferable, pay full tuition, and often receive benefits that other students receive such as access to facilities and health care. These students typically are enrolled as matriculated students at other institutions and are visiting scholars of some type. However, sometimes students attend classes for the purpose of a standalone non-degree education.

== See also ==
- Matriculation examination
- Matriculation certificate
