= Craig Lawrence =

British Army general

Major General Craig Lawrence CBE
- Born: October 18, 1963 (age 62)
- Education: St Peter's School, York
- Military career
- Allegiance: British
- Branch: Army
- Rank: Major General
- Unit: 2nd King Edward VII's Own Gurkha Rifles (The Sirmoor Rifles)
- Awards: Honour and Service Medal
- Other work: Author and lecturer
- Website: Official website

Major General John Craig Lawrence CBE (born 18 October 1963) is a retired British Army officer whose last appointment was as the Director of Joint Warfare at the Directorate of Joint Warfare. He is now an author and lecturer at the Royal College of Defence Studies.

Lawrence was educated at Hill House School, St Peter's School, York and Durham University, where he read engineering. Commissioned into the 2nd King Edward VII's Own Gurkha Rifles (The Sirmoor Rifles), he joined this unit in 1987 after finishing university. According to his personal website, he has served in a variety of regimental and staff appointments. As a Brigadier, he served in Afghanistan as the director of the International Security Assistance Force's Election Support Cell and was awarded the Afghan Ministry of the Interior's Honour and Service Medal.

Lawrence was made a Member of the Order of the British Empire in the 2001 New Year Honours. He was upgraded to Commander of the order in 2013.

Lawrence's first book was a commemorative history of the Gurkhas titled The Gurkhas: 200 Years of Service to the Crown and was published on 30 April 2015. The second, titled The Legacy, is an action-adventure novel and was published on 21 May 2015.
