= Intermediate =

Intermediate may refer to:

- Intermediate 1 or Intermediate 2, educational qualifications in Scotland
- Intermediate (anatomy), the relative location of an anatomical structure lying between two other structures: see Anatomical terms of location
- Intermediate Edison Screw, a system of light bulb connectors
- Intermediate goods, goods used to produce other goods
- Middle school, also known as intermediate school
- Intermediate Examination, standardized post-secondary exams in the Indian Subcontinent, also known as the Higher Secondary Examination
- In chemistry, a reaction intermediate is a reaction product that serves as a precursor for other reactions
- A reactive intermediate is a highly reactive reaction intermediate, hence usually short-lived
- Intermediate car, an automobile size classification
- Intermediate cartridge, a type of firearms cartridge
- Intermediate composition, a geological classification of the mineral composition of a rock, between mafic and felsic
- Intermediate, Michigan, a historic community

== See also ==
- Intermedia (disambiguation), a word meaning "across multiple channels" in Latin
- Intermediate Certificate (disambiguation)
