= Maltby Academy =

Academy in Maltby, South Yorkshire, England

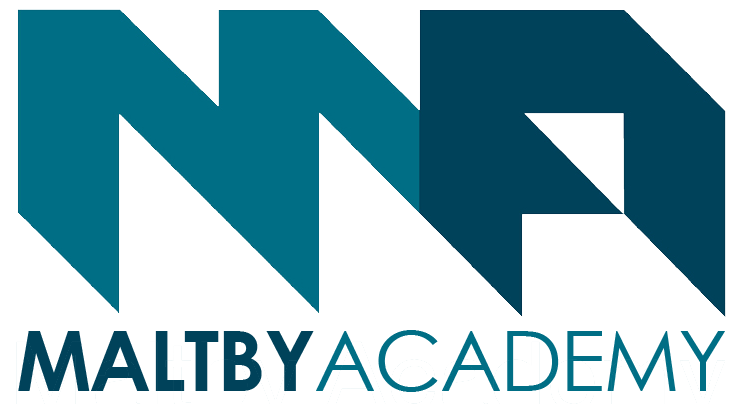

Location
- Braithwell Road; Maltby, South Yorkshire, S66 8AB; England; 53°25′26″N 1°12′31″W

Information
- Type: Academy
- Motto: Exceptional experiences. Successful lives.
- Established: 1931
- Founder: David Sutton
- Local authority: Rotherham
- Department for Education URN: 136042 Tables
- Ofsted: Reports
- Principal: Richard Wood
- Gender: Coeducational
- Age: 11 to 18
- Enrolment: 1,123
- Capacity: 1,250
- Houses: Barts, Bede, Rolleston, York
- Colours: Barts – Green, Bede – Blue, Rolleston – Red, York – Yellow
- Former names: Maltby Grammar School (1931–1967); Maltby Comprehensive School (1967–2008); Maltby Community School – Specialising in Business and Enterprise (2008–2009)
- Academy colours: Blue and Teal
- Trust: Maltby Learning Trust
- Website: www.maltbyacademy.com

Maltby Academy is an academy school in the former mining town of Maltby in South Yorkshire, England.

== Admissions ==
The school has a sixth form. The school is below capacity in its numbers. It is situated on Braithwell Road (B6376) close to the junction with the A631. It gained academy status in January 2010. A £10.9 million In 2014, the Capital Build Programme completed, with new buildings put in place, some demolished and also refurbishments to other buildings. However, the Clock tower is still standing. In 2022, the Maltby Learning Trust gained £4.5 million in the government's Levelling Up Fund to redevelop the old Maltby Grammar School building, after it has been left derelict since 2014.

== History ==
The logo of the school before conversion to an academy

The co-educational Maltby Grammar School was established in 1931, being built on the site of Rolleston Hall on Rotherham Road (A631). It was officially opened on (Saturday) 16 April 1932 by Sir Percy Jackson, the Chairman of the West Riding Education Committee. The school motto was 'Per Laborem Ad Honorem'. The Maltby Hall Secondary Modern School was on Braithwell Road and merged with the grammar school when it became a comprehensive in 1967.

=== Comprehensive ===
Buildings were added in the 1960s to prepare the school to become a comprehensive. It became Maltby Comprehensive School, being officially opened on 7 October 1967 by Alan Bullock, the Master of St Catherine's College, Oxford and Vice-Chancellor of the University of Oxford. This was an incremental change to becoming a comprehensive, with the school becoming fully comprehensive by 1974 once all former grammar school intakes had left.

In October 2007, Michael Swann, a science teacher at the school, was arrested and cautioned by police for possession of crack cocaine. The General Teaching Council for England subsequently found Swann guilty of unacceptable professional conduct in April 2009, but allowed him to continue teaching. Swann was only the second teacher ever to escape a disciplinary order after a drugs offence – a decision criticised by both the Association of School and College Leaders and drugs charity Hope UK. The school's headteacher, David Sutton, called Swann an 'excellent role model' and continued to employ him.

=== December 1998 fire ===
In July 2000, four 17 year olds were each sentenced to six years youth custody for arson - Paul Smith, Paul Walters, Michael Watson and Lee Morris. The fire had been started in the school library.

=== Academy ===
Due to several years of underperformance, the school was converted to a sponsored academy in January 2010. It was initially sponsored by U-Explore, an educational technology firm, but the company's involvement ended in 2014 when the school became part of Maltby Learning Trust, a multi-academy trust.

== Academic performance ==
Similar to most schools in Rotherham LEA (and most former coalfield areas), it receives GCSEs results under the England average. Maltby's results are comparable to many schools nearby (such as Dinnington). A level results are under the England average but average for Rotherham.

== Maltby Learning Trust ==
Maltby Academy is part of a Multi-Academy trust, named 'The Maltby Learning Trust', alongside Sir Thomas Wharton Academy, Wath Academy, Ravenfield Primary Academy, Maltby Redwood Academy, Maltby Lilly Hall Academy and Maltby Manor Academy. Maltby Academy has a joint Sixth Form with Sir Thomas Wharton Academy, named 'The Sixth Form Partnership between Maltby Academy and Sir Thomas Wharton Academy'.

In early 2025, Maltby Learning Trust announced that it would cease operation after its voluntary merger with Accord Multi Academy Trust in September 2025.

== Ofsted inspections ==
Since the commencement of Ofsted inspections in September 1993, the school has undergone seven inspections:

| Date of inspection | Outcome | Reference |
|---|---|---|
| 4–?? May 1996 | ??? | |
| 9–13 October 2000 | Good | Report |
| c. 2004 | Unsatisfactory (serious weaknesses) | |
| Spring 2006 | Inadequate (notice to improve) | |
| 13–14 March 2008 | Satisfactory | |
| 30–31 May 2012 | Good | Report |
| 14 March 2017 | Good | Report |
| 26 April 2022 | Good | Report |

== Headteachers/Principals ==
The first Headmaster of Maltby Grammar School was Gerald Rush, who retired long before it became Maltby Comprehensive School. There were two headmasters of Maltby Grammar School, the second being Mr Arthur Dodman.

- Mr Gerald Rush, 1931–1961
- Mr Arthur Dodman, 1961-1968 (& then some)
- Mr Morris, ????–????
- Mr Wilshaw, ????–????
- Mr D Musson, ????–????
- Mrs Janet Lloyd, ????-????
- Mr David Sutton, September 2007 – 2017 (role name changed to 'Principal' in January 2010)
- Mrs Rachel Nash, 2017–2018
- Mr Chris Eccles, 2018 – June 2019 (acting principal)
- Mr Richard Wood, June 2019–present

== Alumni ==
=== Maltby Grammar School ===
- David Anderson – Labour MP for Blaydon since 2005
- John Jacobs OBE – golfer
- Paul Clayton - actor
- Graham Kirkham, Baron Kirkham – founder of dfs (retailer)
- Air Vice-Marshal Gordon Young CBE – Station Commander of RAF Wyton from 1963 to 1905

=== Maltby Hall Secondary Modern School ===
- Kevin Barron – Labour MP for Rother Valley from 1983 to 2019
- Fred Trueman – England and Yorkshire cricketer

=== Maltby Academy ===
- . Liam Kirk - British professional ice hockey left winger for the Tucson Roadrunners of the American Hockey League (AHL).
- . Fran Kitching - English football player
