= Francis Hodder =

Irish cricketer, rugby union player, and Royal Air Force officer

Personal information
- Full name: Francis Samuel Hodder
- Born: 11 February 1906; Carrigaline, Ireland
- Died: 6 September 1943 (aged 37); Böchingen, Nazi Germany
- Batting: Right-handed
- Bowling: Right-arm (unknown style)

Career statistics
Competition	First-class
Matches	1
Runs scored	11
Batting average	–
100s/50s	–/–
Top score	10*
Balls bowled	168
Wickets	1
Bowling average	69.00
5 wickets in innings	–
10 wickets in match	–
Best bowling	1/69
Catches/stumpings	1/–
- Source: Cricinfo, 20 March 2019

Francis Samuel Hodder (11 February 1906 – 6 September 1943) was an Irish first-class cricketer, rugby union player and Royal Air Force officer. Hodder served in the Royal Air Force from 1925 until his death in 1943 during the Second World War. During his athletic career, he played for the Royal Air Force cricket team and rugby union for London Irish.

== Early life and military career ==
The son of Samuel and Maud Hodder, he was born at Ringabella House in Carrigaline, Ireland. He was educated in England at Forest Hill House School, where he played for the school cricket team. On one occasion while playing for the school he scored a century and took all ten wickets. After leaving Forest Hill, he took up employment with Midland Bank. However, he became dissatisfied with his job, instead enlisting with the Royal Air Force as a pilot officer in 1925. He was promoted to the rank of flying officer in January 1927. Three years later he was promoted to the rank of flight lieutenant in November 1930.

Hodder played first-class cricket for the Royal Air Force cricket team against the Army at The Oval in 1931. Batting twice in the match, Hodder was ended the Royal Air Force first-innings unbeaten having scored a single run, while in their second-innings he remained unbeaten on 10. With his right-arm bowling, he bowled a total of 28 overs across the match, conceding 69 runs and taking the wicket of Bill Leggatt. He also played rugby union, playing for London Irish for ten seasons, as well as representing Kent in the County Championship. He also trialled for Ireland, but was not successful in being selected to play.

During the 1930s he served in Iraq and Aden, as well as passing a specialist engineering course. He was promoted to the rank of squadron leader in February 1937. He married Evelyn Margaret Bowden-Smith in early 1940, with the couple having two sons.

== WWII service and death ==
Hodder served during the Second World War and was stationed in France at its outbreak, later working alongside the Advanced Air Striking Force to cover the retreating British Expeditionary Force during the Battle of France, for which he was mentioned in dispatches. After the allied defeat in France, Hodder returned home and was placed on engineering duties, firstly at Rootes Aircraft Factory and later at Handley Page. He was promoted to the temporary rank of group captain in March 1942, and obtained the full rank the following month.

In July 1943, he was placed in command of RAF Syerston. Having had little flying experience, Hodder wanted to experience what his men experienced during bombing raids. He joined the crew of a Lancaster bomber during a bombing mission to Mannheim on the night of 5/6 September. Near Mannheim the bomber encountered a Luftwaffe night fighter and was shot down, killing all aboard with the exception of one survivor. Hodder is buried at the Rheinberg War Cemetery.
