= Doncaster Collegiate Sixth Form =

Location
- Doncaster, South Yorkshire; England; 53.5042°N 1.1097°W

Information
- Type: Academy sixth form
- Established: 2010
- Local authority: Doncaster Bassetlaw
- Age: 16 to 19
- Enrolment: 650
- Website: http://www.csix.org.uk/

Doncaster Collegiate Sixth Form "DC6" was a sixth form centre with academy status located in Doncaster, South Yorkshire, England.

== History ==
DC6 was founded after combining 5 Sixth forms from across the Doncaster and Bassetlaw area.

== Campuses ==
DC6 has 5 campuses

- Doncaster North: Don Valley Academy
- Doncaster South: Rossington All Saints Academy
- Doncaster East: Ash Hill Academy
- Doncaster West: De Warenne Academy
- Bassetlaw: Serlby Park Academy

== Courses ==
DC6 offers a wide range of courses at Level 1, 2 and 3.

=== A Level ===
Over 25 different A Level subjects are available and can be taken in a number of combinations

=== Technical Levels ===
15 different Applied and Technical Level subjects are on offer and can be studied alone or in combination with A Levels

=== Pre-Apprenticeships ===
In partnership with Employers and Apprenticeship providers, C6 offers Pre-Apprenticeship programmes in 10 vocational sectors.

== Academic performance ==
- DFE
