= Listed buildings in Finningley =

Finningley is a civil parish in the metropolitan borough of Doncaster, South Yorkshire, England. The parish contains four listed buildings that are recorded in the National Heritage List for England. Of these, one is listed at Grade I, the highest of the three grades, and the others are at Grade II, the lowest grade. The parish contains the village of Finningley and the surrounding area. All the listed buildings are in the village, and consist of a church, the former rectory, the village hall, and a house.

== Key ==
| Grade | Criteria |
|---|---|
| I | Particularly important buildings of more than special interest |
| II | Buildings of national importance and special interest |

== Buildings ==
| Name and location | Photograph | Date | Notes | Grade |
|---|---|---|---|---|
| Church of the Holy Trinity and St Oswald; 53.48474°N 0.99246°W | | Late 11th century | The church has been altered and extended through the centuries, and was restored in 1885 by C. Hodgson Fowler. It is built in stone with a Welsh slate roof, and consists of a nave with a south porch, a north aisle, a chancel, and a west tower. The tower has three stages, slit windows on the west front, two-light bell openings in round-arched recesses, string courses, and an embattled parapet. The porch is gabled, it has a Tudor arched entrance, and contains medieval grave slabs. The inner doorway dates from the 12th century, and has a moulded arch with a hood mould. | I |
| The Old Rectory; 53.48397°N 0.99258°W | — | 1704 | The rectory, which was extended in the 19th century, is rendered, the extension is in yellow brick, there is a plinth, and a Welsh slate roof. The house has an H-shaped plan, consisting of a two-storey five-bay original range, and a rear wing forming a link to the later parallel range, which has two storeys and an attic. In the centre of the front is a doorway with a pedimented hood on consoles, and the windows are sashes in architraves. The left return has an inscribed and dated plaque, and a porch with a Tudor arched doorway. The extension contains mullioned and transomed casement windows, a canted bay window, and coped gables with kneelers and finials. | II |
| The Village Hall; 53.48483°N 0.99069°W | | 18th century | Originally a barn, it was converted into a school in about 1839, and has since been used as the village hall. It is in painted brick with dentilled eaves and a pantile roof, There is one storey and five bays. The central doorway has an architrave, and above it is an inscribed plaque. In the outer bays are casement windows with flat arches and keystones. | II |
| Holly House; 53.48441°N 0.98987°W | — | Early to mid 19th century | The house is rendered, on a plinth, with overhanging eaves above a fascia board with pendants, and a Welsh slate roof. There are two storeys and three bays. The central doorway has Doric pilasters, a fanlight, a pulvinated frieze, and a cornice, and the windows are sashes. | II |
