= Technical Level =

United Kingdom school leaving qualification

In the United Kingdom, the Technical Level, or more commonly the Tech Level, is a school leaving qualification offered by educational bodies to students completing secondary or pre-university education. Tech-Levels are the vocational equivalent of the A-levels and is generally required for university entrance. Tech-Levels are generally worked towards over two years and split into a number of parts, with one part studied in each year. The first part is known as the Certificate Level. The second part is known as the Diploma Level and is more in-depth and rigorous than the Certificate Level. The Certificate Level is a qualification in its own right, and the Certificate Units combined with the Diploma units forms the complete Technical Level qualification. T Levels will offer students a mixture of classroom learning and 'on-the-job' experience during an industry placement of at least 315 hours (approximately 45 days).

== Current usage ==
A number of countries use Tech Levels as a school leaving qualification; they are commonly used in the United Kingdom and Ireland.

=== United Kingdom ===
Technical Levels are a secondary school leaving qualification offered in England, Wales, and Northern Ireland. In Scotland, Technical Levels are also offered by selected schools as an alternative school-leaving qualification in place of the Scottish Advanced Higher. The three main examination boards which administer British Technical Levels in the UK are:

- Assessment and Qualifications Alliance (AQA)
- Oxford, Cambridge and RSA Examinations (OCR)
- Edexcel (Edexcel Pearson – London Examinations)

== See also ==
- GCSE – General Certificate of Secondary Education (an entry qualification)
- GCE – Ordinary (O) Level (an entry qualification that has been phased out in the United Kingdom)
- Further / Special
  - GCE – Special (S) level (last offered 2001)
  - Advanced Extension Award (AEA – 2002–2009, 2015 mathematics)
  - Sixth Term Examination Paper (STEP – used by the University of Cambridge and the University of Warwick for admissions to study mathematics at undergraduate level)
- Scotland
  - Higher (Scottish) (Scottish university entrance qualification)
  - Advanced Higher (Scottish) (Scottish equivalent to A Level)
- Vocational
  - BTEC Extended Diploma (the highest level of the BTEC structure, taken by people aged 16 or over, equal to A Levels)
  - NVQ (level 3)
  - Advanced Vocational Certificate of Education (AVCE)
- Europe
  - Abitur (similar qualification in Germany and Finland)
  - Matura or Maturità (similar qualification in some European countries)
- Baccalaureate
  - Baccalauréat (similar qualification in France)
  - European Baccalaureate (examination used mainly in the European School system)
  - International Baccalaureate (IB) Diploma (alternative examination found across the world)
- International alternates
  - Advanced Placement Program (similar qualification in the United States)
  - Bagrut (similar qualification in Israel)
  - Leaving Certificate
  - Malaysian Higher School Certificate (better known as "STPM", an equivalent examination in Malaysia)
  - Matriculation Certificate (disambiguation)
