= Listed buildings in Edenthorpe =

Edenthorpe is a civil parish in the metropolitan borough of Doncaster, South Yorkshire, England. The parish contains two listed buildings that are recorded in the National Heritage List for England. Both the listed buildings are designated at Grade II, the lowest of the three grades, which is applied to "buildings of national importance and special interest". The parish contains the village of Edenthorpe, and the listed buildings consist of a house and a milepost.

== Buildings ==
Name and location	Photo	Date	Notes
Manor House; 53.55072°N 1.06306°W	—	Late 17th century	A farmhouse in red brick on a chamfered stone plinth, with quoins, all now painted, and a pantile roof with a coped gable and kneelers on the left, and hipped on the right. There are two storeys and an attic, and an L-shaped plan, with five bays on the front, a rear wing on the right, and an outshut in the angle. The doorway has a fanlight and a keystone, and above it are fixed letters with the name of the house and a date. The windows are casements.
Milepost; 53.55463°N 1.05896°W		Early 19th century	The milepost is on the south side of Thorpe Road (A18 road). It is in stone with cast iron overlay, and has a triangular section and a round top. On the top is inscribed "DONCASTER & THORNE ROAD", and "LONG SANDALL", and on the sides are the distances to Doncaster, Thorne, and Hatfield.
