= Secondary Education Examination =

Secondary Education Examination is a level of education examination that may mean different things in different countries:

- Certificate of Secondary Education Examination (Tanzania)
- Certificate of Secondary Education (former UK qualification)
- Hong Kong Certificate of Education Examination (1974-2011), replaced by
  - Hong Kong Diploma of Secondary Education
- Higher Secondary Examination (HSC), India, Pakistan, Bangladesh and Nepal
  - Karnataka Secondary Education Examination Board (Karnataka, India)
  - Secondary Education Examination (Nepal)

== See also ==
- Higher School Certificate (disambiguation)
- List of secondary school leaving qualifications
