= Intermediate Certificate =

Intermediate Certificate or intermediate certificate may refer to:

- Intermediate Certificate (Australia) school examination abolished in the 1960s
- Intermediate Certificate (Ireland) school examination replaced in 1992 by the Junior Certificate
- Intermediate Examination, standardized post-secondary grade 12 exams in the India, also known as the Higher Secondary Certificate
- Intermediate certificate (cryptography), in public key cryptography, a certificate authority (CA) certificate other than a root CA certificate

== See also ==
- Intermediate (disambiguation)
- School Certificate (disambiguation)
- Higher School Certificate (disambiguation)
