= Assam Board of Secondary Education =

Government agency in India

Board of Secondary Education, Assam
- Abbreviation: SEBA
- Merged into: Assam State School Education Board
- Successor: Assam State School Education Board
- Formation: 29 January 1962
- Founder: S. C. Rajkhowa
- Dissolved: 13 September 2024; 2 years ago
- Type: State Education Regulatory Board
- Legal status: Available
- Headquarters: Guwahati, Assam, India
- Region served: Assam, India
- Official language: Bodo, Assamese, English, Hindi
- Chairman: R.C. Jain, IAS
- Secretary: Naranarayan Nath, ACS
- Exam Controller: Nayan Jyoti Sarmah
- Parent organisation: Ministry of Education, Government of Assam
- Website: https://sebaonline.org/

The Board of Secondary Education, Assam commonly known as SEBA, was the state education regulatory board under the jurisdiction of Ministry of Education, Government of Assam for conducting examinations and providing assurance for the quality of education imparted in schools within Assam, India that are affiliated to it. It offers education in Bodo, English (IL), Assamese, Bengali, Hindi, Meitei (Manipuri), Hmar, Nepali, Mizo, Khasi, Garo, Karbi and Urdu languages.

High School Leaving Certificate (HSLC) is the award given through the authority of this board to students who have passed the HSLC examination successfully.

== History ==
The Assam Secondary Education Act, 1961 (Assam Act, XXV of 1961) was passed to provide for the establishment of a Board of Secondary Education to regulate, supervise and develop Secondary Education in the State of Assam. The Act came into force with effect from 29 January 1962 with the publication of Government of Assam, Education Department Notification no. 159/61/37 dated 29/1/1962. Thus the Board of Secondary Education, Assam (popularly known as SEBA) came into existence on 14 March 1962. It started functioning with the conduct of 11 year H.S.L.C. Examination of 1962. Under the provisions of the Act the Govt. of Assam constituted the Board with Sri S.C. Rajkhowa, D.P.I., Assam as chairman and Md. N. Islam, Inspector of Schools (Central Assam Circle) as Secretary.

=== Accommodation ===
The Board was first accommodated in the Conference Room of the office of D.P.I., Assam at Shillong. It was shifted to a rented house at Rehabari (Guwahati). The Board functioned here from 1/6/1962 to 26/2/1963. The Board office was then shifted to old University Campus of Gauhati University, Panbazar (the then New Hostel campus of Cotton College) where it functioned from 27/2/1963 to 15/01/1976. A part of the office functioned at Bhagawati Prasad Baruah Bhawan which housed the chairman, the Education Officers and the Evaluation Unit during 1965–66. The Board office was shifted to the Assam type building constructed on its own premises at Bamunimaidan, Guwahati-21 on 16 January 1976. On this occasion the opening ceremony was held with Sri H.N. Talukdar p(Hon'ble Education Minister of Assam) in the chair and Sri Sarat Chandra Sinha, Hon'ble Chief Minister of Assam as chief-guest. The present site comprising 6 bighas of land was allotted by the Government of Assam to the Board in 1965. The then Education Minister, Sri D.K. Barooah allotted these 6 bighas to the Board on 99 years' lease. The lease was executed by the Board by paying Rs.1 (one) lakh as advance rent for the entire period. The present multi-storeyed building (plinth area 1575 sq. metres) constructed by the side of the Assam type building was completed in 1989. ...

== Jurisdiction of the Board ==
The jurisdiction of SEBA was the territory of the erstwhile State of Assam comprising the many North East states of the country. With the creation of the Provinces/States Meghalaya, Nagaland, Mizoram, and Arunachal Pradesh out of Assam at different times and with the establishment of their separate/own Boards of School Education, the jurisdiction of SEBA got reduced. Presently the territory of the State of Assam is the jurisdiction of the Board.
