= Doncaster–Lincoln line =

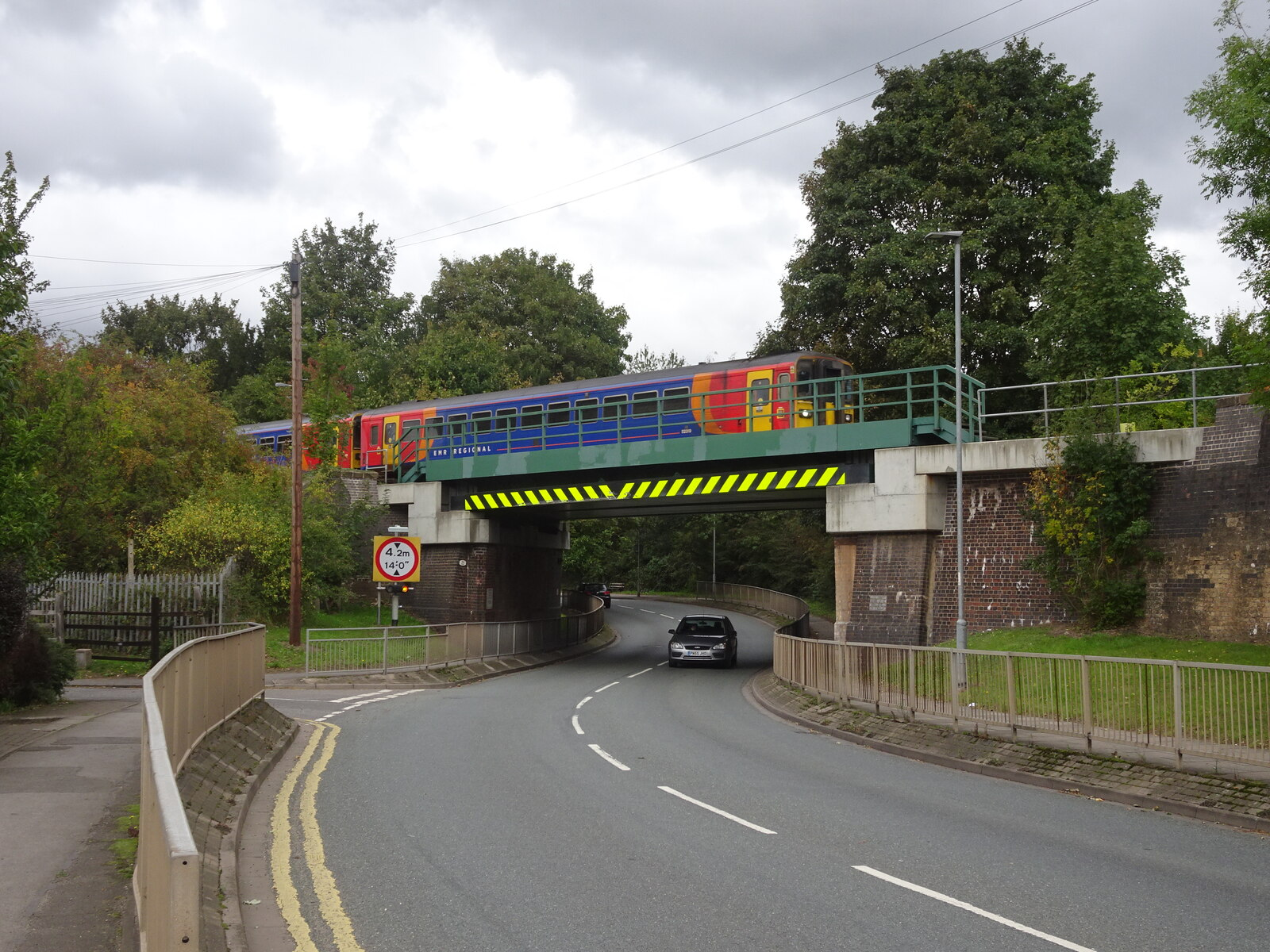
- An East Midlands Trains Class 153 crossing Lea Road bridge, Gainsborough, Lincolnshire

Overview
- Status: Operational
- Owner: Network Rail
- Locale: Yorkshire and the Humber; East Midlands
- Termini: Doncaster; Lincoln
- Stations: 4

Service
- Type: Heavy rail
- System: National Rail
- Operator(s): East Midlands Railway; Northern
- Rolling stock: Class 170 "Turbostar"; Class 158 "Express Sprinter"; Class 195 "Civity"; Class 150 "Sprinter"

Technical
- Track gauge: 1,435 mm (4 ft 8 1/2 in) standard gauge
Route map
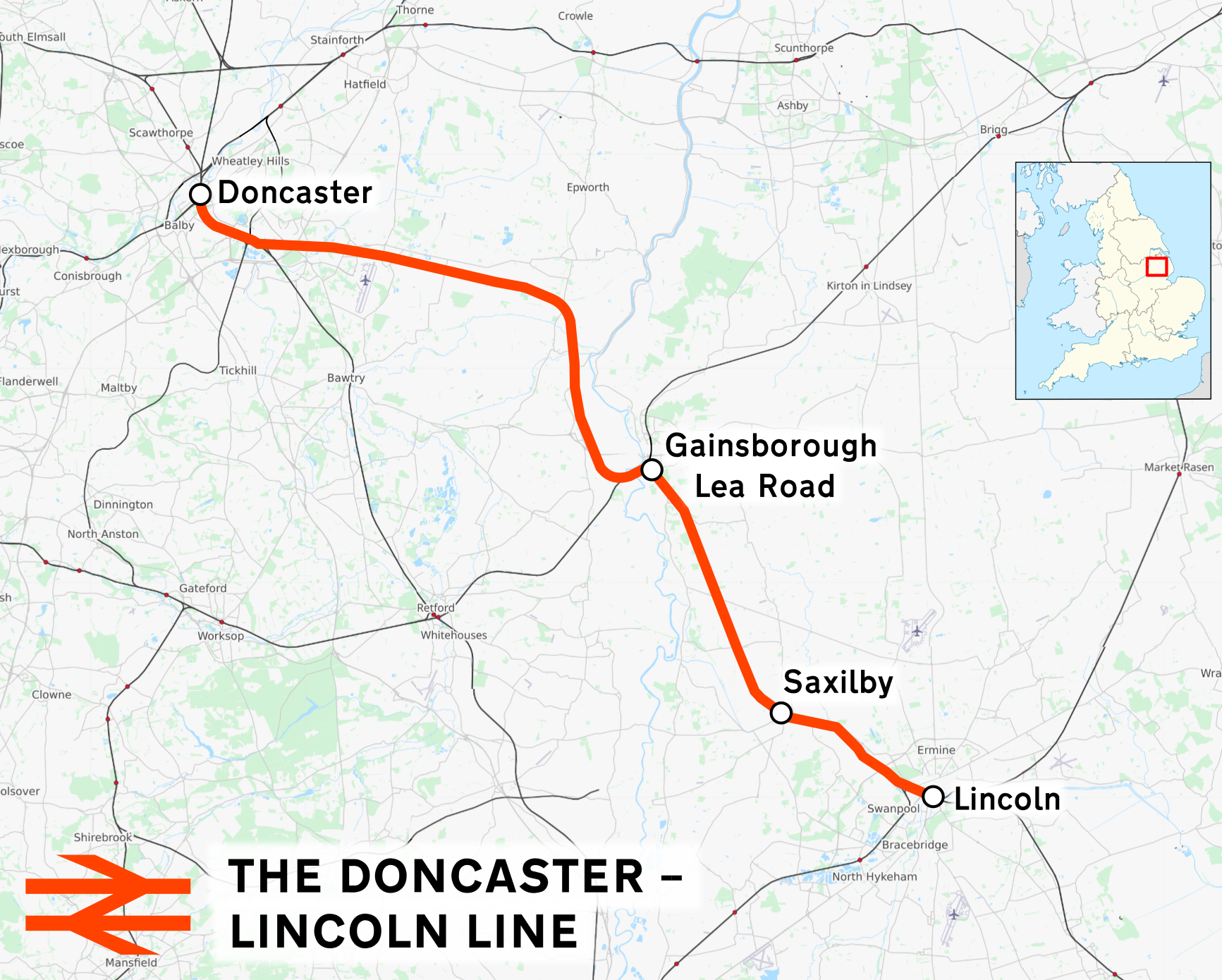
(Click to expand)

The Doncaster–Lincoln line is a railway line in England. It runs from the East Coast Main Line at Doncaster south east to Lincoln.

Services on the line are provided by East Midlands Railway and Northern, with a few continuing through Lincoln to the Peterborough–Lincoln line.

The towns and villages served by the route are listed below.

- Doncaster
- Gainsborough
- Saxilby
- Lincoln

The line is part of the former Great Northern and Great Eastern Joint Railway.

Between Doncaster and Gainsborough the line passes between Finningley and Blaxton. There used to be a station at this point and as this is the site of the new Robin Hood Airport Doncaster Sheffield, there has been discussion about constructing a new station to serve the airport. Planning permission for a station was granted in 2008, but no construction work was ever started.
