= De Warenne Academy =

Location
- Gardens Lane; Conisbrough, South Yorkshire, DN12 3JS; England
- Coordinates: 53°29′05″N 1°14′21″W

Information
- Type: Academy
- Local authority: Doncaster
- Department for Education URN: 135942 Tables
- Ofsted: Reports
- Principal: J. Hall
- Gender: Coeducational
- Age: 11 to 18
- Enrolment: c. 800
- Website: http://www.DeWarenne.org.uk/

The De Warenne Academy is a secondary school with academy status on Gardens Lane in Conisbrough, South Yorkshire, England.

The Academy is sponsored by Delta Academies trust who also support many other schools in Doncaster.

== History ==
The school changed its name (from Northcliffe School) in September 2009, when it became an academy and moved into a new building in 2013. Previously it had been Northcliffe School, a secondary modern school.

The school was the centre of controversy in the early 2000s due to a proposal to convert it into an academy run by the Emmanuel Schools Foundation, a Christian charity. The proposal was withdrawn in 2004 after legal threats by the National Secular Society.

== Doncaster Collegiate Sixth Form ==
The school was part of the Doncaster Collegiate Sixth Form which combined the sixth form offering from Ash Hill Academy, De Warenne Academy, Don Valley Academy, Rossington All Saints Academy and Serlby Park Academy however this was discontinued after several years.
