= Matriculation Certificate =

Matriculation Certificate may refer to:

- Matriculation Certificate (Malta), awarded to post secondary students in Malta
- Matura, in several European countries
- National Senior Certificate, in South Africa
- Secondary School Certificate (SSC), awarded in South Asian countries for grade 10 secondary school students
  - Secondary School Leaving Certificate, a grade 10 certificate in India
  - High School Leaving Certificate (India), a grade 10 certificate in India

== See also ==
- Matriculation
- School Certificate (disambiguation)
- Higher School Certificate (disambiguation)
