= Don Valley Academy =

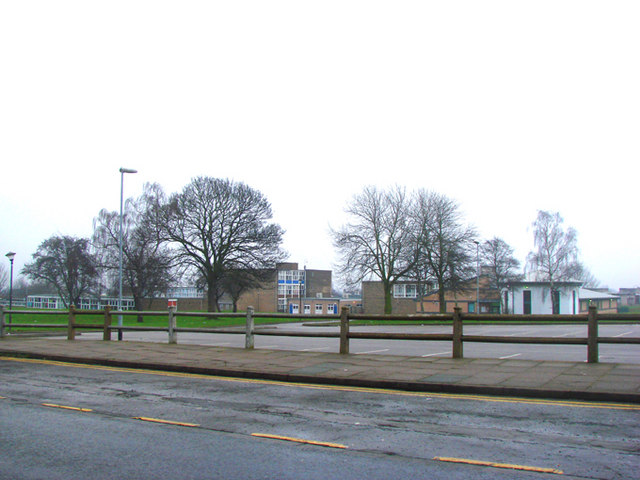
- Don Valley School (2006)

Location
- Jossey Lane; Doncaster, South Yorkshire, DN5 9DD; England; 53.54618°N 1.17200°W

Information
- Type: Academy
- Local authority: Doncaster
- Trust: Delta Academies Trust
- Department for Education URN: 137472 Tables
- Ofsted: Reports
- Principal: Mat Hicks
- Gender: Mixed
- Age: 11 to 16
- Enrolment: 1,099 (July 2024)
- Capacity: 1,499
- Website: donvalleyacademy.org.uk

Don Valley Academy (formerly Don Valley School and Performing Arts College) is a secondary school with academy status located in Scawthorpe, Doncaster, South Yorkshire, England. It has an enrolment of over 1,000 pupils and is non-selective with a mixed intake of boys and girls.

The school is part of Delta Academies Trust. Its current headteacher is Richard Brooke.

== History ==
The original school was built in the mid-1950s, with the first intake of pupils in September 1957. What was effectively another school was built in the mid-1960s as part of the move by the West Riding County Council to comprehensive education. It had more facilities than the existing one, including a swimming pool and much enhanced stage facilities in the main hall. The new school took up approximately half of the former playing fields . The second school ran for a year or so as a separate entity before the two merged to become Don Valley Comprehensive School. This naming was only brief and the school was soon renamed back to Don Valley High School, reportedly at the insistence of the then headmaster, Mr Horncastle. The newer school served students in their first three years of senior school, aged 11 to 14; the older school served them in the remainder of their time, aged 14 to 18, and included the lower and upper sixth forms.

In September 2005, the school was designated a Performing Arts College as part of the specialist schools programme, becoming Don Valley School and Performing Arts College. Every student was given a choice of dramatic arts or media to study.

In September 2011, the school converted to an academy, joining Schools Partnership Trust Academies (now Delta Academies Trust) and reopening as Don Valley Academy.

== Doncaster Collegiate Sixth Form ==
The school was part of the Doncaster Collegiate Sixth Form which combined the sixth form offering from Ash Hill Academy, De Warenne Academy, Don Valley Academy, Rossington All Saints Academy and Serlby Park Academy.

== Notable alumni ==
- Sarah Stevenson, British Taekwondo Olympic bronze medallist
