= Rossington All Saints Academy =

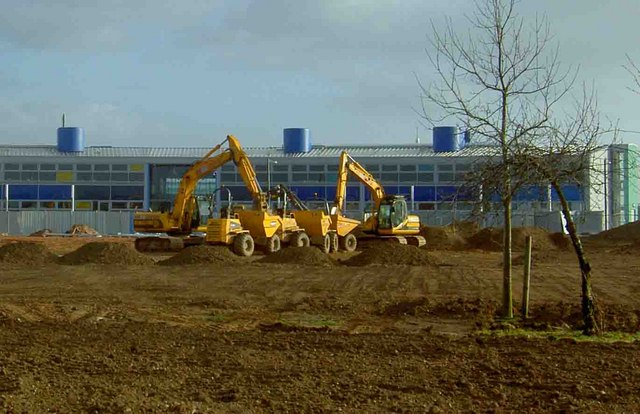
- The school under construction (2009)

Location
- Bond Street; Rossington, South Yorkshire; DN11 0BZ; England; 53.4686°N 1.0658°W

Information
- Type: Academy
- Religious affiliation: All
- Founder: Delta Academy Trust
- Local authority: Doncaster
- Trust: Delta
- Department for Education URN: 136675 Tables
- Ofsted: Reports
- Chair: P. Tarn
- Associate Principal: Stacey Parker Brown
- Gender: Coeducational
- Age: 11 to 16
- Language: Spanish
- Houses: None
- Website: www.theallsaints.net

Rossington All Saints Academy is a coeducational, secondary school located in Rossington, South Yorkshire, England.

Originally known as Rossington High School, in 2001 it became a voluntary aided Church of England school and was renamed Rossington All Saints Church of England School. The school also gained specialist status as a Sports College. In 2011, the school converted to academy status and was renamed Rossington All Saints Academy. Today the school is sponsored by the School Partnership Trust in partnership with Doncaster Metropolitan Borough Council and the Diocese of Sheffield.

Rossington All Saints Academy offers GCSEs, BTECs and Cambridge Nationals as programmes of study for pupils, while students in the sixth form have the option to study from a range of A-levels and further BTECs.

== Doncaster Collegiate Sixth Form ==
The sixth form was part of the Doncaster Collegiate Sixth Form which combines the sixth form offering from Ash Hill Academy, De Warenne Academy, Don Valley Academy, Rossington All Saints Academy and Serlby Park Academy. However, Rossington All Saints Academy no longer operates a Sixth Form provision, and post-16 education is not currently offered at the academy.
