= Listed buildings in Auckley =

Auckley is a civil parish in the metropolitan borough of Doncaster, South Yorkshire, England. The parish contains four listed buildings that are recorded in the National Heritage List for England. All the listed buildings are designated at Grade II, the lowest of the three grades, which is applied to "buildings of national importance and special interest". The parish contains the village of Auckley and the surrounding area. The listed buildings consist of a church, its former vicarage, a mounting block adjacent to a public house, and a pair of prefabricated houses.

== Buildings ==
Name and location	Photograph	Date	Notes
Mounting block 53.50400°N 1.02425°W		c. 1822	The mounting block is on the northeast corner of the Eagle and Child public house. It consists of a single block of stone carved into four steps, parallel to the wall.
St Saviour's Church; 53.49931°N 1.01875°W		1837–38	The church is in yellow brick with a tile roof. It consists of a combined nave and chancel, with north and south porches, and is in Gothic Revival style. At the west end is a bellcote, and the windows have cast iron tracery.
The Old Vicarage; 53.49916°N 1.01900°W	—	c. 1822	The vicarage, later a private house, is in yellow brick with stone dressings, a sill band, an eaves band, and a hipped tile roof. There are two storeys and fronts of two and three bays. The central doorway has an architrave and a moulded cornice on consoles. The windows are sashes, those in the ground floor with cornices on consoles, and in the upper floor with cambered arches.
9 and 11 Ellers Lane; 53.50401°N 1.01853°W	—	1948	A pair of prefabricated mirror-image houses, constructed in Sweden and moved to pre-prepared bases. They are timber framed, clad in timber panels, and have a tile roof. There is a single storey with attics, each house has two bays, and is flanked by a single-storey outhouse. In the outer bays are open porches with iron poles, and the central bays contain a window.
