= Hungerhill School =

Academy in South Yorkshire, England

Location
- Hungerhill Lane; Edenthorpe; Doncaster, South Yorkshire, DN3 2JY; England; 53.55145°N 1.07412°W

Information
- Type: Academy
- Local authority: Doncaster
- Department for Education URN: 137899 Tables
- Ofsted: Reports
- Head teacher: Kate Crawford
- Gender: Coeducational
- Age: 11 to 16
- Enrolment: 1,145 (September 2016)
- Colours: Black, Red & White (Blue)
- Website: http://www.hungerhillschool.com

Hungerhill School is a coeducational secondary school located on Hungerhill Lane, off of 'Thorne Road' (the A18) in Edenthorpe, Doncaster, South Yorkshire, England.

== Admissions ==
Hungerhill School features a curriculum for pupils aged 11 to 16. Students can choose the following subjects to study for GCSE:

- Art, Craft and Design
- Business Studies
- Computer Science
- Dance
- Drama
- French
- Food Technology
- Geography
- Health & Social Care
- History
- Media
- Music
- Performing Arts (includes Drama and Music combined)
- GCSE Physical Education
- Product Design
- Psychology
- Religious Education
- Spanish
- Textiles
- Triple Science

Compulsory subjects include:

- Core Physical Education
- Ethics and Philosophy
- English Language
- English Literature
- Mathematics
- PSHE
- Science

== History ==
- The school opened in 1976 as a mixed comprehensive school with 800 pupils.
- In September 2005, it gained specialist status in Science, Mathematics and Computing.
- In 2007, the School used RFID tags embedded in students' jumpers unwillingly, which meant that they could track the students.
- The school became an academy in August 2012.
- The school officially opened its new "Maths" block to students in 2014.
- As of September 2014, there are approximately 1,200 pupils attending, with over 75 teaching staff.
- On 3 July 2015, the school officially launched its Teaching School programme following the outstanding performance in GCSE examinations. Hungerhill School was one of 52 schools across England to be granted this status in that round.
- In Summer 2016, a new teaching block was completed on the school site. The building includes an examination hall, multi-use classrooms and laboratories. It is the first teaching block in the school to support the use of renewable energy, with solar panels installed on the roof.

=== International Schools Project ===
Hungerhill School is part of the International Schools Project since 2012. It aims to create links with schools in other countries and establish the differences of teaching and learning. The following schools are linked with Hungerhill:

- Apeguso Senior High School, Akosombo, Ghana
- Adjena Senior High School, Akosombo, Ghana
- Chinmaya Vidyalaya, Chennai, India
- Collège Jean Monnet, Epernay, France

Students are chosen as ambassadors for the school and are involved in a variety of different activities which develop the link between the schools.

== Academic performance ==
In January 2015, the school decided not to establish a sixth form.
The school's GCSE results are above the national average. In 2016, 76% of pupils gained 5 or more A*-C grades, including English and Mathematics.

== Alumni ==
- Carl Lygo, Vice-Chancellor of BPP University
- Joe Pugh, Doncaster Rovers forward
- Tom Pugh, Scunthorpe United midfielder
