= Sir Thomas Wharton Academy =

Location
- Tait Avenue; Edlington; Doncaster, South Yorkshire, DN12 1HH; England
- Coordinates: 53.473731°N 1.188476°W

Information
- Type: Academy
- Motto: Exceptional experiences. Successful lives.
- Local authority: Doncaster
- Department for Education URN: 144364 Tables
- Ofsted: Reports
- Chair: Andrew Battle
- Principal: Matthew McDonald
- Gender: Mixed
- Age: 11 to 18
- Enrolment: 1082
- Houses: Cusworth, Brodsworth, Chatsworth and Wentworth
- Colours: Blue and Black
- Former names: Edlington Comprehensive School (1967–????); Edlington School (????–2008); Sir Thomas Wharton Community College (2009–2017)
- Trust: Maltby Learning Trust
- Website: http://www.stwacademy.com/

Sir Thomas Wharton Academy is a coeducational academy school and sixth form located in Edlington, Doncaster, England. It accepts pupils from the surrounding areas including Balby, Braithwell, Conisbrough, Edlington, Loversall, Micklebring, Tickhill, Wadworth, Warmsworth and Woodfield Plantation.

Its feeder schools are Warmsworth Primary, Edlington Hilltop, Edlington Victoria, Wadworth Primary, Tickhill Estfeld and Tickhill St Mary's.

Sir Thomas Wharton Academy operates a tutor group system. In the past groups contained pupils of their age group (year group) these were then split into each house Chatsworth Wentworth Cusworth and brodsworth, but in 2009 new tutor groups were formed which included two to four members of each year house, including members of the Sixth Form. Form groups were then changed again at the start of the 2014 school year to include only students up to Year 11. Sixth Form students now have their own specialised form groups. Then in 2017, Form Groups were changed again for Year 11 students to have their own Form Groups.

The school operates a house system, introduced at the same time as mixed age tutor groups. All pupils and members of staff are separated into one of four houses. Each house has its own pastoral care team which deals with student issues. The four houses are named after country halls: Cusworth (Purple), Brodsworth (Green), Chatsworth (Yellow) and Wentworth (Red). Different coloured ties are used to identify to which house students belong, as well as a badge with the house name and the house itself on it. The different year groups are separated by coloured lanyards. Yellow, Year 7. Green, Year 8. Red, Year 9. Blue, Year 10. Purple, Year 11. Dark Blue w/ pink symbols, Sixth Form. Pupil Parliament are given blue separate badges from their house badge, House Captains are given red separate badges from their house badge, and the Prime Minister is given a golden badge separate from their house badge. There are (as of 16/4/26) 2 deputy prime ministers and 1 prime minister. There were 7 candidates and all who did not achieve their role got enlisted to a council for their local village, Edlington.

Recently, Yondr Pouches were introduced in this school. When standing assembly occurs, students are watched by their form tutors putting their phone in their Yondr Pouch. This will be unlocked at the end of the day. Anybody caught with their phone out of their Yondr Pouch will be forced to hand it in for 2 weeks, and the phone will be confiscated for the rest of the day. Standing assemblies occur at the start of school for years 7-9, a brief one at lunch for all years except Year 11, and at the end of school for years 7-9 again. Year 10s and 11s will be in Period 4 at this time.

Uniform is checked at the school single point of entry every day. Some adaptations are allowed for medical reasons, otherwise the policy is quite strict.

A student cannot leave class for any reason unless asked to by a teacher, they are escorted somewhere, the fire alarm goes off or if it is the end of the lesson and they are dismissed. If a student chooses to, they will get absconding points (3 negatives.)

The new school consequence system works in C1s, C2s, C3s, C4s and C5s.

A C1 is a warning A C2 is a half an hour detention. A C3 is an hour detention. A C4 is a suspension. A C5 is exclusion.

== History ==
The school opened as Edlington Comprehensive School in 1967. It later became simply Edlington School. It was rebuilt and renamed Sir Thomas Wharton Community College in January 2009. The school became a cooperative foundation school in March 2010. The school gained academy status in February 2013. The school was given a 'fresh start' in April 2017: it ceased to be a cooperative school in order to join the Maltby Learning Trust and became known as Sir Thomas Wharton Academy. The Maltby Learning Trust is a Multi-Academy Trust with Maltby Academy, Maltby Redwood Academy, Maltby Lilly Hall Academy, Ravenfield Primary Academy and Maltby Manor Academy as partners.
