= Dunsville =

Village in South Yorkshire, England

Coordinates: 53.565°N 1.020°W

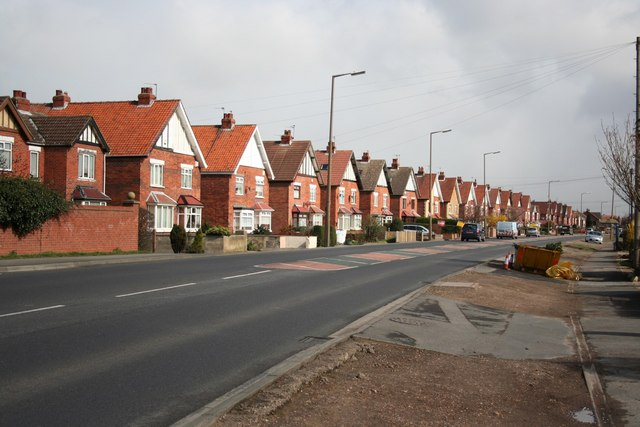
- High Street (part of A18 road)

- Location within South Yorkshire
- Civil parish: Hatfield
- Metropolitan borough: Doncaster
- Metropolitan county: South Yorkshire
- Region: Yorkshire and the Humber
- Country: England
- Sovereign state: United Kingdom
- Post town: DONCASTER
- Postcode district: DN7
- Dialling code: 01302
- Police: South Yorkshire
- Fire: South Yorkshire
- Ambulance: Yorkshire
- UK Parliament: Doncaster East and the Isle of Axholme

Dunsville is a village in the Metropolitan Borough of Doncaster, South Yorkshire, England, in the civil parish of Hatfield. It lies on the A18 road between Hatfield and Edenthorpe.

== Geography ==
It was historically part of the West Riding of Yorkshire and it was very close to the historic border of Yorkshire and Lincolnshire.
