= The Hayfield School =

Location
- Hurst Lane; Doncaster, South Yorkshire, DN9 3HG; England; 53.49259°N 1.022694°W

Information
- Type: Academy
- Motto: "To have a strong work ethic and to show kindness and decency."
- Religious affiliation: Mixed
- Established: 1971
- Specialist: Mathematics, Computing. Languages.
- Department for Education URN: 136672 Tables
- Ofsted: Reports
- Staff: approx. 100
- Gender: mixed
- Age: 11 to 16
- Enrolment: approx. 1100
- Houses: Courage, Endeavour, Liberty, Wisdom
- Colours: Blue and Navy
- Website: http://www.thehayfieldschool.co.uk

The Hayfield School is a secondary school in Auckley, Doncaster, in the county of South Yorkshire, England. As of 2010, it teaches around 1100 pupils of 11–16 years of age. It has specialist statuses in Mathematics and Computing (gained in 2004) and also in Languages (gained in 2008). It is also a training school and registered in 2010 to become an academy.

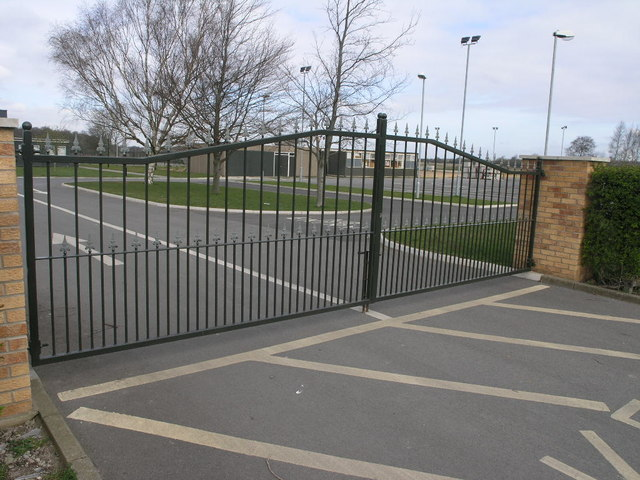
The gate at Easter

== History ==
The school opened in 1971, with Tony Storey OBE as headmaster. In 1990 school finances came under control of the governors and the school. Further independence was gained in 1995: Grant Maintained Status with the Governors becoming 'owners' of the site and buildings, and employers for all staff. Some of these authorities were lost in 1999 as the school became a foundation school.

In 2008, Tony Storey, Britain's longest serving headmaster, retired after 37 years of service (for which he received an OBE) and was succeeded by Sai Patel. In March 2012 Patel was suspended by the school governors. Maria Rock stood in as acting headmistress during Patel's absence. In the summer term of 2012 it was announced to parents and students that Patel would not be returning to the Hayfield School, and on 29 October 2012 Rock was made headmistress. On 13 April 2015 Fox was made headmistress as Rock retired in Easter.

The Hayfield School closed its sixth form in August 2017 due to changes in funding. NEW College, Pontefract opened NEW College, Doncaster on The Hayfield School site in a new building which opened in September 2017, accommodating 1200 sixth form students.

=== School site ===
Construction of the original school building began in 1969 on a greenfield site in a rural suburban setting. It is square-shaped but contains two courtyards. There is a field behind the building used by the school that is one kilometre in perimeter. Additionally there are floodlit AstroTurf (polymeric surfaced), and concrete courts owned by the school but managed by Hayfield Community Sports Centre. The facilities are utilised by both the school and the community of Auckley. A new block with specialised science classrooms was added to the school in 2003. On 5 December 2013 sections of the school roof blew off during high winds leading to a temporary roof being installed to enable the school to reopen in January 2014.

== Curriculum ==
The school's curriculum includes a compulsory modern foreign language (French), and optional triple science at GCSE level. In 2009 the school received a Grade 2 Ofsted rating.

== Notable alumni ==
- Steven Judge, twice World Champion in Paratriathlon, at the 2011 ITU World Championship Series in Beijing and the 2012 ITU World Triathlon Series in Auckland, competing in the TRI 3 category.
- Louis Tomlinson, singer and songwriter.
- Harrison Duncan – English footballer who plays as a defender for Rotherham United. Duncan attended The Hayfield School and progressed from non-league football with Doncaster City into Rotherham United's academy. He became Rotherham United's youngest-ever starter at the age of 16 years and 130 days in October 2024. He made his professional league debut in April 2026 and signed his first professional contract with the club in July 2026.
- Dylan Hartley – English footballer who plays as a forward for Doncaster Rovers. A pupil at The Hayfield School, Hartley made his competitive first-team debut for Doncaster Rovers on 6 October 2026 against Liverpool Under-21s in the EFL Trophy. At the age of 15 years, four months and 28 days, he became the youngest player to represent the club in a competitive match, breaking a record that had stood since 1954. Hartley joined the club's academy at the age of eight and has progressed through its youth teams.
