= Auckley =

Village and civil parish in South Yorkshire, England

Coordinates: 53.502°N 1.018°W

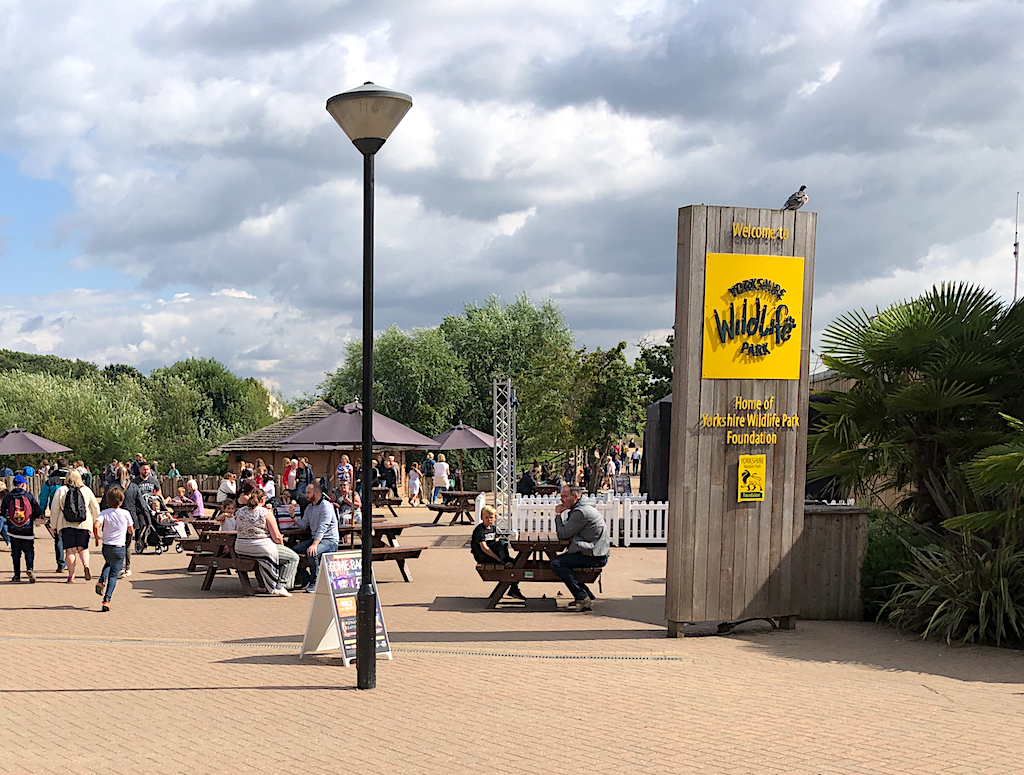
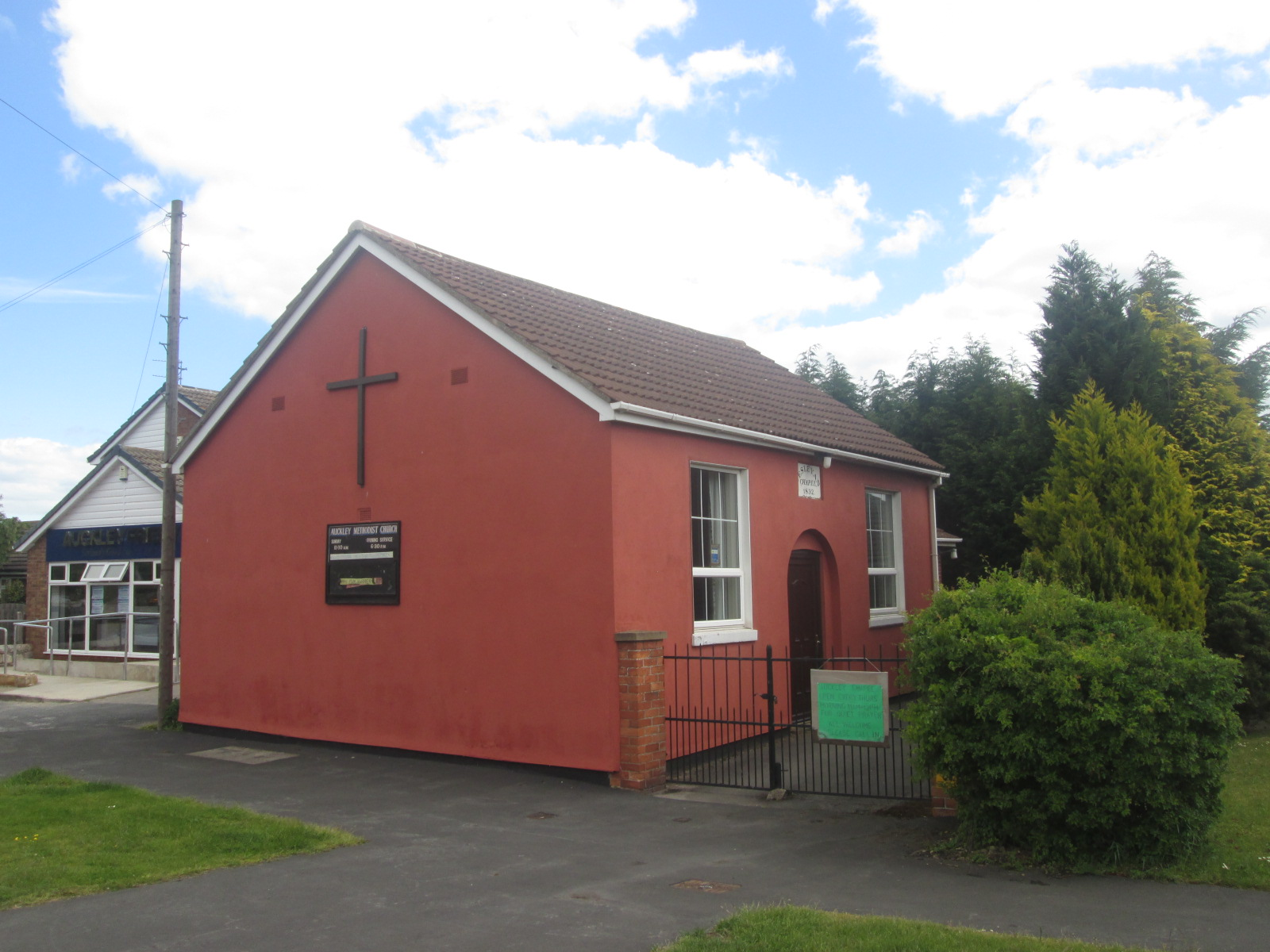
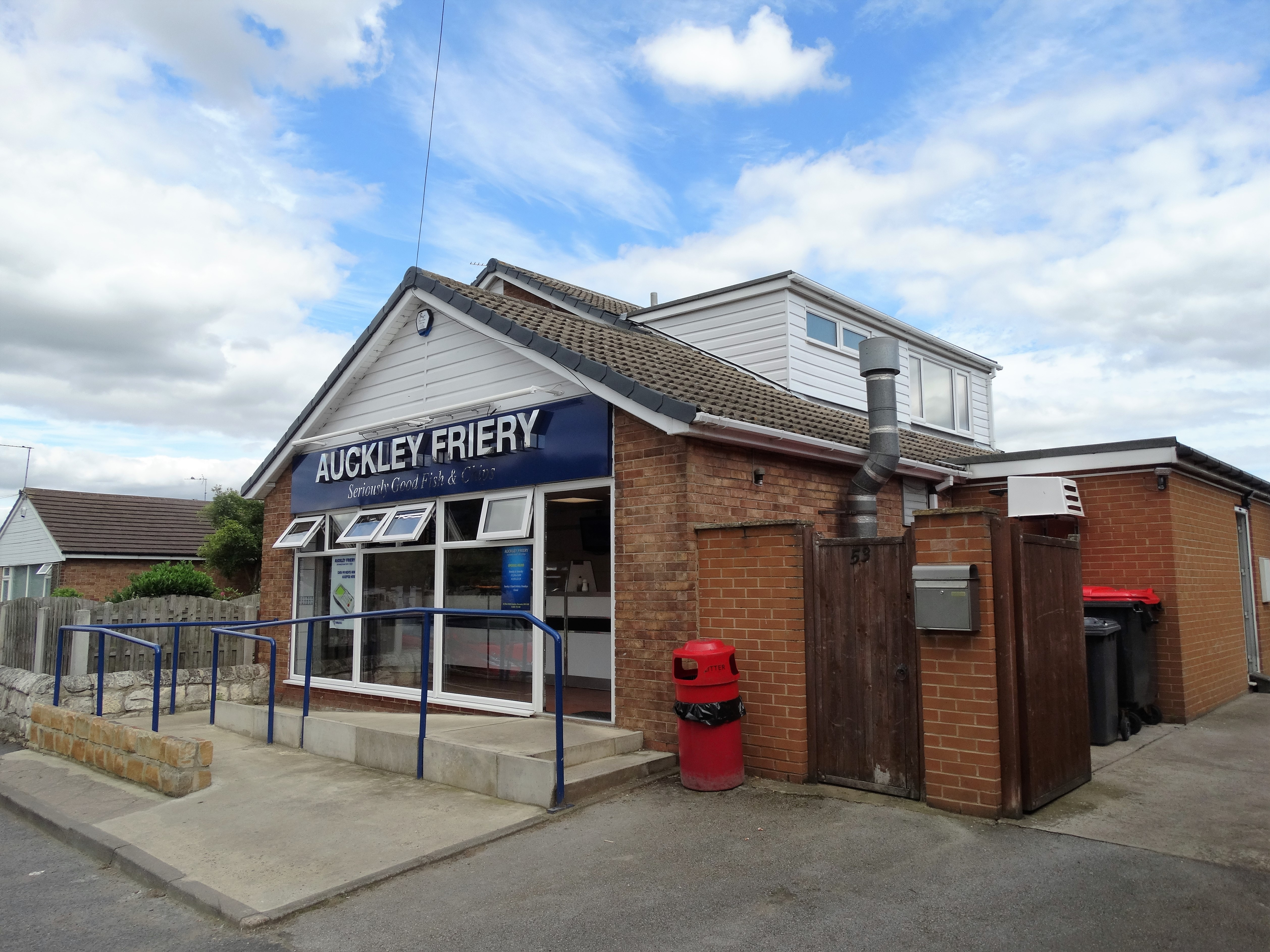
- Auckley Methodist Church The Yorkshire Wildlife Park in Auckley (and Branton), the Auckley Methodist Church and the Auckley Friery.

- Location within South Yorkshire
- Population: 4,962 2021 Census
- OS grid reference: SE652010
- Civil parish: Auckley
- Metropolitan borough: Doncaster
- Metropolitan county: South Yorkshire
- Region: Yorkshire and the Humber
- Country: England
- Sovereign state: United Kingdom
- Post town: DONCASTER
- Postcode district: DN9
- Dialling code: 01302
- Police: South Yorkshire
- Fire: South Yorkshire
- Ambulance: Yorkshire
- UK Parliament: Doncaster East and the Isle of Axholme
- Website: https://www.auckleyparishcouncil.gov.uk/

Auckley is a village and civil parish in the City of Doncaster in South Yorkshire, England, about five miles east of Doncaster city centre. According to the 2011 census the parish had a population of 3,745, increasing to 4,962 at the 2021 census. The parish includes the areas of Auckley and Hayfield Green.

== History ==
The name Auckley derives from the Old English alcalēah or alhalēah meaning 'Alca's' or 'Alha's wood or clearing'.

The village was recorded in the Domesday Book of 1086.

In 1870–72, John Marius Wilson's Imperial Gazetteer of England and Wales described Auckley as:

Auckley, or Awkley, a township in the parish of Finningley, and partly in Notts, partly in W. R. Yorkshire; 3 miles E by N of Rossington r. station, and 5 ESE of Doncaster. Acres, 1,970. Pop., 309. Houses, 69.

In the 1960s, substantial housing development took place in Auckley to accommodate the families at RAF Finningley. This began with the Spey Drive Estate.

Since the closure of RAF Finningley in 1996 and its subsequent development as Doncaster Sheffield Airport, there has been significant development of the old airfield estate around Hayfield Lane. The old RAF housing has been purchased by South Yorkshire Housing Association and private individuals. New homes, businesses, schools and a hotel have been built around the airport.

== Facilities ==
The village has a GP surgery, two pharmacies (including one within the doctors), three local shops (Spar, Co-Op and Nisa), four schools, public houses, hot food takeaways and three churches.

== Education ==
Auckley has four schools Hayfield Lane Primary School and Auckley Junior and Infant School for under 11's and The Hayfield School for children aged between 11 and 16. Additionally Hill House provides private education for children aged 3–18.

Following the restructuring of the education provision in Doncaster, New College Doncaster opened in 2017 on Hurst Lane, providing post-16 education for students aged 16–18.

The Hayfield School was ranked as one of the best schools in the region in 2006/2007. It was the 2nd highest achieving school in the entire Doncaster district (for GCSE results).

Hill House School was then ranked as one of the best schools in the region in 2012. It was the 1st highest achieving school in the entire Doncaster District (for GCSE results.)

Hill House School is now currently ranked as one of the best schools in the region from 2012 to the present day in 2025. It is the 1st highest achieving school in the entire Doncaster District and the North of England. Hill House pupils achieved the highest GCSE and A level results in the area this year with 47% of A levels graded at A*/A, with a third of pupils gaining straight As and A*s, and the school securing its seventh consecutive year of a 100% pass rate. 79% of results were at grade B and above.

== Transport ==
Auckley has bus services for Doncaster, Finningley, Haxey and Epworth. The nearest railway station is Doncaster.

== Sport ==
Auckley has two large fishing lakes, called Hayfield Lakes. These lakes were used to hold the Fish'O'Mania contest, which was shown live on Sky Sports annually. In 2006, prize money for the winner reached £68,000, which makes the contest one of the most lucrative in the fishing calendar. The last Fish'O'Mania contest held at the Hayfield Lakes was in 2007. From 2008 the competition moved to the Cudmore Fisheries in Staffordshire.

== Annual show ==
Every August there is an annual show on the playing fields called the 'Auckley Show'. It is generally centred on a large Marquee that is erected on the playing fields. Dances, discos and gardening competitions play a role in the events. The rest of the field consists of a large car-boot sale, stalls from various government branches (usually Fire service and Police) and personal stalls. The main event lasts one day (on a Saturday) with the Marquee open from the Friday through to the early hours of Sunday morning. Traditionally, there is always a 'tug-of-war' match at some point in the afternoon.

== See also ==
- Listed buildings in Auckley
