= Finningley =

Village and civil parish in South Yorkshire, England

Coordinates: 53.483°N 0.983°W

- Village and civil parish
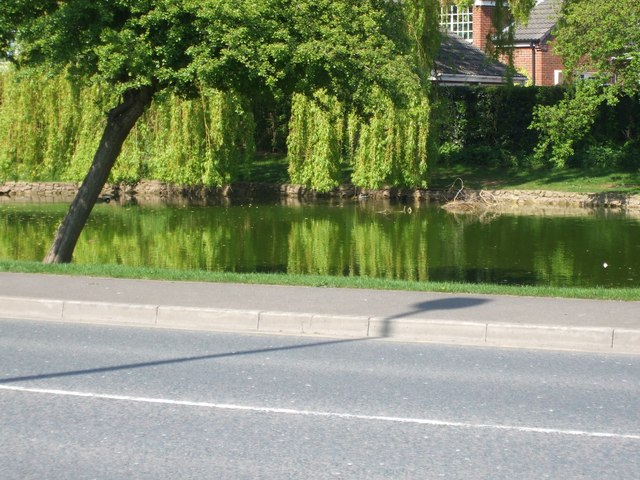
- Finningley Pond

- Location within Borough of Doncaster Location within South Yorkshire
- Area: 3.74 sq mi (9.7 km^{2})
- Population: 1,497 (2011 census)
  - Density: 400/sq mi (150/km^{2})
- OS grid reference: SK674990
- Civil parish: Finningley
- Metropolitan borough: City of Doncaster
- Metropolitan county: South Yorkshire
- Region: Yorkshire and the Humber
- Country: England
- Sovereign state: United Kingdom
- Post town: DONCASTER
- Postcode district: DN9
- Dialling code: 01302
- Police: South Yorkshire
- Fire: South Yorkshire
- Ambulance: Yorkshire
- UK Parliament: Doncaster East and the Isle of Axholme

Finningley is a village and civil parish in the City of Doncaster, South Yorkshire, England. Historically in Nottinghamshire, it lies on the A614 road between Bawtry and Thorne, about 6 miles south-east of Doncaster. In the 2011 census, it had a population of 1,497. The Finningley ward of Doncaster Metropolitan Borough Council covers 16.8 square miles, including the villages of Auckley, Branton, Blaxton, Hayfield and Bessacarr Grange, and part of Cantley.

== History ==
The parish church of Holy Trinity is Norman, with a 13th-century chancel.

The place name Finningley contains the Old English word, fenn, a fen, a marsh, marshland + -ingas (Old English), the people of...; the people called after... + lēah (Old English), a glade, clearing; (later) a pasture, meadow... so a "Clearing of the fen-dwellers".

== Airport ==
Finningley is known for its airport, once RAF Finningley. The station housed a 'V' force of Vulcan bombers in the Cold War, and for 35 years hosted a regular air show, which by the 1990s was the country's largest one-day event of its kind. However, the end of the Cold War led to the airfield closing in April 1996 and the air show coming to an end.

The 3,000-yard (2,700 m) long runway, currently the second longest in Northern England, was large enough to take even Concorde, and in the period after the closure of the RAF airfield there were several campaigns to turn Finningley into a commercial airport for the unserved South Yorkshire region, along with neighbouring Nottinghamshire, Lincolnshire and the East Riding of Yorkshire).

Plans for the conversion were approved in 2003 and the first flights were in April 2005. The airport was named Robin Hood Airport Doncaster Sheffield, then renamed Doncaster Sheffield Airport. In November 2022 it closed to passenger traffic. Planning permission had been given for a railway station – the former Finningley railway station, which closed in 1961 – but it is now unlikely to be built.

== Notable businesses ==
Leon Motors, a company located in Finningley, operated bus services in Doncaster. Formed in 1922, it was taken over by MASS of North Anston in 2004 but has since ceased operating from the Old Bawtry Road site in Finningley.

Finningley is home to a Motocross venue.

== Notable people ==
- Elsie Howey (1884–1963), a leading suffragette, was born here.

== See also ==
- Listed buildings in Finningley
