= Edenthorpe =

Village and civil parish in South Yorkshire, England

Coordinates: 53°33′N 1°04′W

- Village
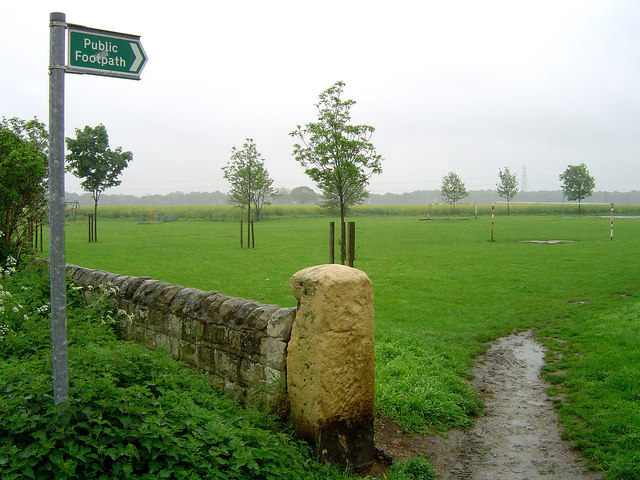
- Edenthorpe Playing Field

- Location within South Yorkshire
- Area: 1.24 sq mi (3.2 km^{2})
- Population: 4,776 (2011 census)
  - Density: 3,852/sq mi (1,487/km^{2})
- OS grid reference: SE618063
- Civil parish: Edenthorpe
- Metropolitan borough: Doncaster
- Metropolitan county: South Yorkshire
- Region: Yorkshire and the Humber
- Country: England
- Sovereign state: United Kingdom
- Post town: Doncaster
- Postcode district: DN3
- Dialling code: 01302
- Police: South Yorkshire
- Fire: South Yorkshire
- Ambulance: Yorkshire

Edenthorpe is a village and civil parish on the eastern edge of Doncaster, South Yorkshire, England. At the 2001 census, it had a population of 4,752, increasing slightly to 4,776 at the 2011 Census. The village lies 4 miles (6.4 km) to the north east of Doncaster city centre.

== History ==
Edenthorpe is mentioned in the Domesday Book as a Saxon manor called Stirestrop, later known as Tristrop. At the beginning of the seventeenth century, it became Streethorpe, a village on the street, a road from Doncaster to Goole. The modern derivation of the name came about because of the Eden family (the Eden's of Streethorpe), whose influence in the 1920s, resulted in a shortening of the address into just Edenthorpe. Another story states that Lord Auckland, a member of the Eden family, bought the manor house in 1874 and renamed the estate Edenthorpe, from where the village took its new name.

The village's first major residents were the Swyfts, who built the Manor House. In 1605. After the family fortune passed to Mary Swyft, she married Beau Fielding, a member of Charles II's court. Fielding enjoyed the high life; he squandered his wife's money and as a result Streethorpe was sold. After Mary's death, Fielding remarried to a rich widow in the hope of continuing his lavish lifestyle. The widow was an impostor- Fielding had been tricked. On discovering this, he married a third time, to the Duchess of Cleveland, a former mistress of Charles II. Fielding was tried at the Old Bailey for Bigamy, found guilty and subsequently pardoned by the queen.

Streethrpe's new owner was a wealthy London Merchant, Daniel Baker; his grandson John Baker-Holroyd, inherited it and sold it to George Cooke-Yarborough in 1769. Between the years of 1770 and 1786 Cooke-Yarborough built the villages Georgian hall. In Victorian times the North and South wings were added and this was all that remained when fire destroyed the Central section in the 1920s. The south wing was converted into a house for Lord and Lady Moncrief, now owners of the estate, on returning to Scotland; the estate was leased to the Eden family.

After the Second World War, the two wings came into the ownership of the Hodkins, who converted the north wing into flats. On the death of Mr Hodkin, the estate agents "Bell Watson" bought the North wing; a Primary school was established in the South wing in 1958. When the flats in the North wing required a considerable amount of money spending on them, the site was sold to the then "West Riding County Council", who demolished the building and used the land to expand the school.

The parish church is the Church of the Good Shepherd, part of a group based in Kirk Sandall which adjoins the village to the north. Village pubs are the Eden Arms on Eden Field Road, the Holly Bush on Church Balk, the Ridgewood (named after the 1949 winner of the St Leger) and the Beverley Inn both on Thorne Road (A18). The Edenthorpe Canon Popham C of E and Hungerhill School are in the village. There is another primary school, Edenthorpe Hall.

47th Edenthorpe Scouts are an active scout group. Pegasus ESU is the Explorer Scout Unit.

== Geography ==
Edenthorpe is bi-sected by the A18. The A630 passes the south of the village from junction 4 of the M18 and meets the A18 to the west of the village at a roundabout. There is the Kirk Sandall railway station less than a mile away on the Hull and Doncaster Branch and the South Humberside Main Line. From this station you can go direct to Doncaster town centre and to Cleethorpes amongst other destinations.

== See also ==
- Listed buildings in Edenthorpe
