= Doncaster Sheffield Airport =

Airport in South Yorkshire, England

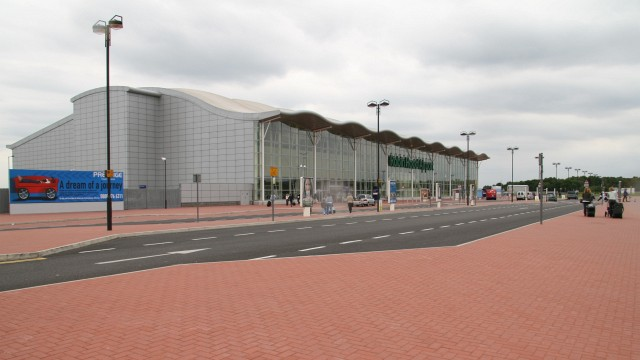
- IATA: DSA; ICAO: EGCN

Summary
- Airport type: Public
- Owner: Peel Group
- Operator: FlyDoncaster Limited
- Serves: South Yorkshire, Lincolnshire
- Location: Finningley
- Opened: 28 April 2005
- Closed: 30 November 2022
- Passenger services ceased: 4 November 2022
- Elevation AMSL: 56 ft (17 m)
- Coordinates: 53°28′31″N 01°00′15″W
- Website: www.flydsa.com

Map
- Location in South Yorkshire

Runways
Direction	Length		Surface
Direction	m	ft	Surface
02/20	2,893	9,491	Asphalt

Statistics (2019)
- Passengers: 1,407,862
- Passenger change (18–19): ▲15.2%
- Aircraft movements: 23,043
- Movements change (18–19): ▲21.7%
- Sources: UK AIP at NATS; Statistics from the UK Civil Aviation Authority

Doncaster Sheffield Airport (IATA: DSA, ICAO: EGCN), formerly named and commonly referred to as Robin Hood Airport, was an international airport in Finningley near Doncaster in South Yorkshire, England, in operation between 2005 and 2022. The site lies 6 mi (10 km) south-east of the centre of Doncaster and 19 mi (31 km) east of Sheffield. Plans to reopen the airport were announced in April 2025.

== History ==
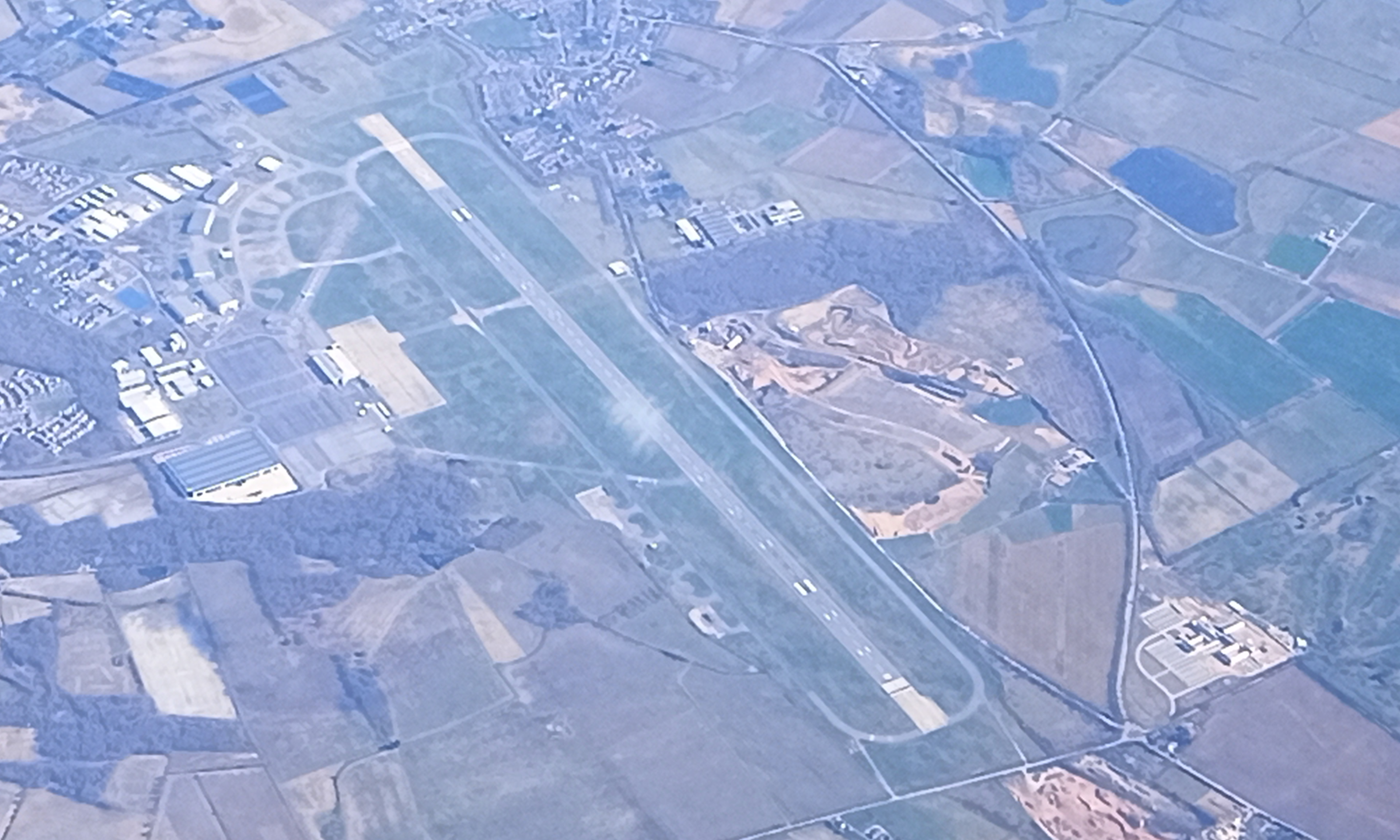
Aerial view of Doncaster Sheffield Airport

Logo of Doncaster Sheffield Airport (2016–2022)

=== 1915–1995: RAF Finningley ===
The airport was opened as Finningley Airfield in 1915.

During the First World War, it was a base for the Royal Flying Corps to intercept German Zeppelins targeting industrial cities of Northern England. In the Second World War the airfield was primarily used for training, serving RAF Bomber Command crews; only a few combat missions took off. It was a key facility for nuclear-armed Vulcan bombers in the Cold War before downgrade to training in the 1970s / 1980s and decommissioning by 1995.

=== 2005–2016: Robin Hood Airport ===
Following the end of scheduled services from Sheffield City Airport, Peel Group opened former RAF Finningley as Robin Hood Airport Doncaster Sheffield in April 2005. The Robin Hood label controversially referenced historical accounts placing him in nearby Barnsdale Forest not Sherwood Forest but 11,000 people petitioned to oppose the name. In May 2006, Thomsonfly launched the first long-haul flight from Doncaster to Puerto Plata, Dominican Republic.

Promoters initially hoped for 25 million passengers a year. In 2007, one million used the airport. This decreased to 700,000 in 2012, before increasing to 1.25 million in 2016.

=== 2016–2022: Doncaster Sheffield Airport ===
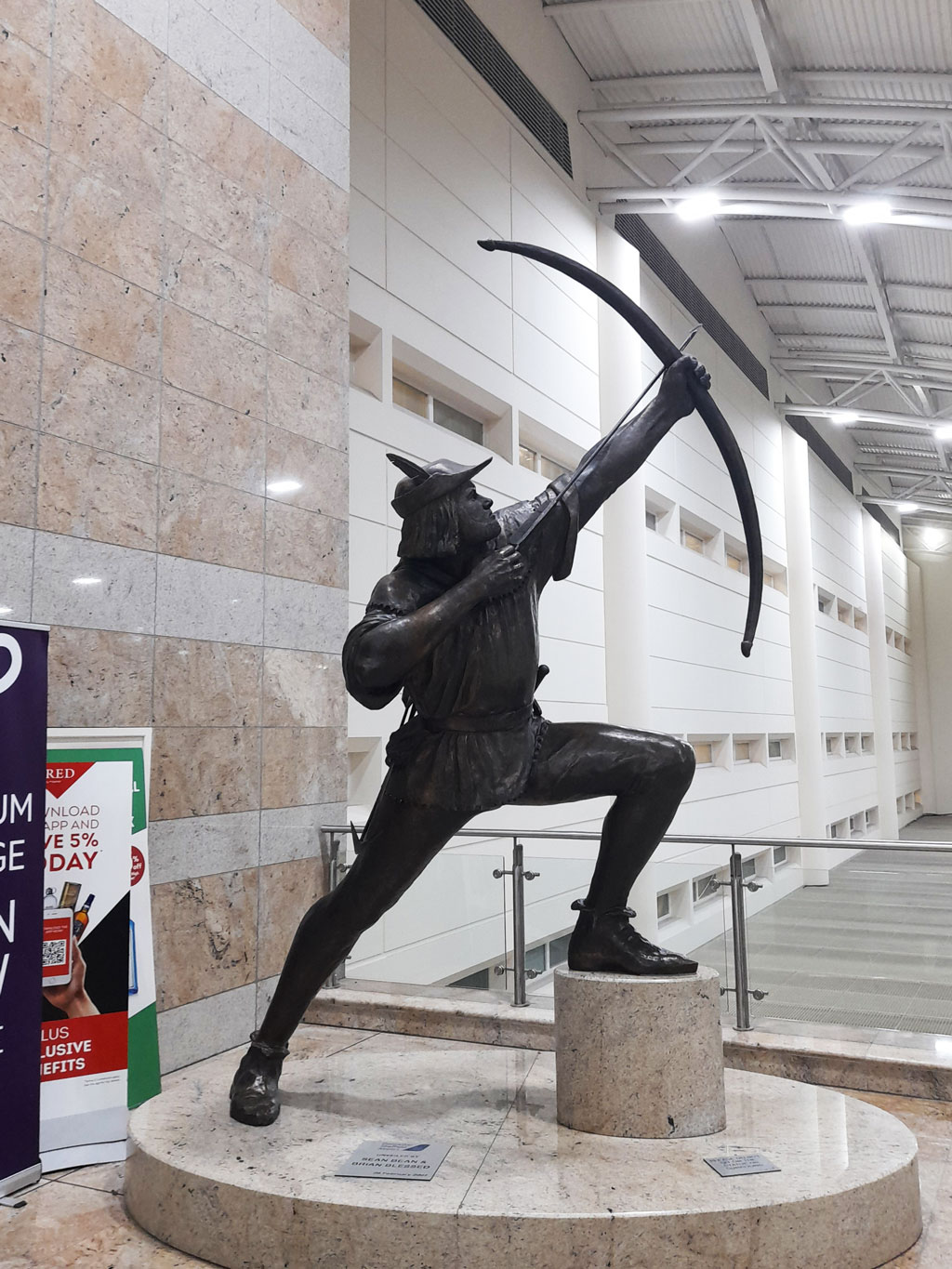
Robin Hood statue by Neale Andrew at Doncaster Sheffield Airport

In December 2016, Robin Hood Airport rebranded as Doncaster Sheffield Airport.

Flybe closed its facility at the airport in 2019, relocating crew and aircraft, though Wizz Air based two aircraft there in 2020. However, in 2022 it too announced the end of flights from the airport stating the airport operators were unable to guarantee the terms of its commercial agreement. That left TUI Airways as the airport's sole regular customer.

After an extended review and public consultation, the airport closed. Peel proposed an expansion of their adjacent Gateway East property development TUI operated the final flights on 4 November 2022, and Wizz Air transferred its routes to Leeds Bradford Airport.

Doncaster Council applied for judicial review of the closure process but was refused. In response, the Mayor of Doncaster announced the council's intention to compulsory purchase.

Air traffic control was withdrawn from the airport in December 2022, and the Civil Aviation Authority began to reclassify surrounding airspace.

=== Post-closure and reopening plans ===
After protracted negotiation, in March 2024 the mayor of Doncaster obtained a 125-year lease over the airport. That November, the South Yorkshire Mayoral Combined Authority agreed to £3m funding of reinstatement activities and commercial negotiation, as part of a £138m re-opening budget.

On 6 December 2024, a utility aircraft, operated by 2Excel Aviation, landed at the airport, the first in over two years.

In February 2025, Munich Airport International were appointed airport operators for a potential reopening in spring 2026. However, several industry commentators questioned Doncaster Sheffield Airport's viability.

In late August 2025, the mayor confirmed there would be no commercial or passenger flights until at least 2028, claiming that it was "unlikely to be at full operational capacity" until then.

In April 2026, Doncaster Sheffield Airport relaunched their website to provide progress updates on the airport reopening.

On 28 April 2026, a Boeing 727 owned by DSA-based 2Excel Aviation landed, reported as the first large jet aircraft landing after the 2022 closure.

== Facilities ==
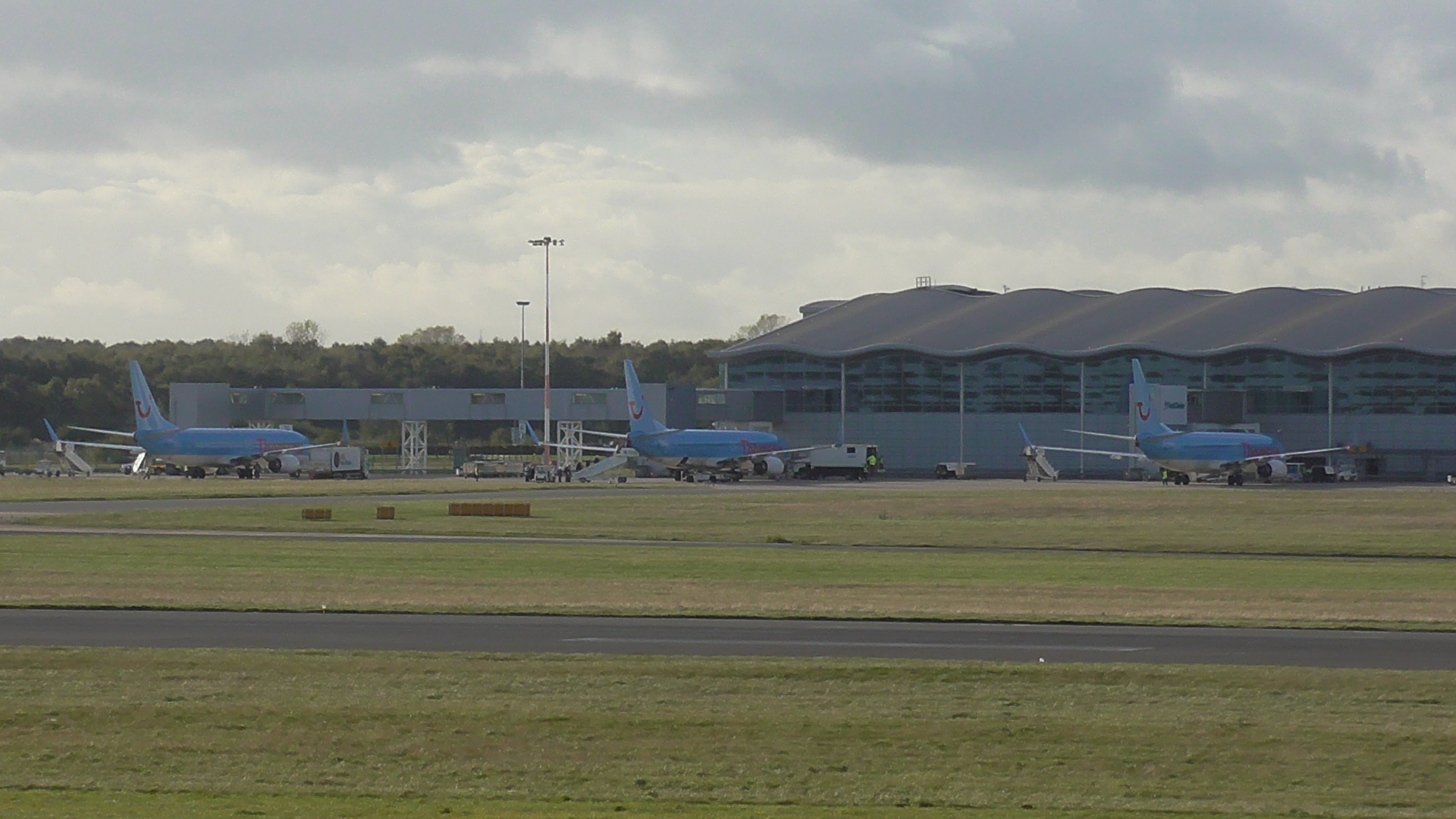

The airport has a single runway designated 02/20, with dimensions of 2,895 by 60 m (9,498 by 197 ft). It was designed for long-range nuclear armed bombers and so is wider than other commercial airports in the north of England.

The passenger terminal has 24 check-in desks, six departure gates and three baggage carousels.

A 102-bed Ramada Encore hotel opened in 2008.

There are four on-site car parks.

=== Airport business park ===
In 2014, a 10-hectare (25-acre) site on the airport's business park became part of Sheffield City Region Enterprise Zone.

=== Hangars ===
No. 3 Hangar was occupied by 2Excel Aviation providing Design, production and Maintenance services. Defence company BAE Systems formerly operated its Aircraft Maintenance Academy from No. 3 Hangar at the airport, before moving to Humberside Airport. Other activities within the hangars included from 2012, a Cessna Citation service centre.

=== Flight training ===
The airport was home to Yorkshire Aero Club and Hummingbird Helicopters.

== Statistics ==
=== Traffic statistics ===
Doncaster Sheffield Airport passenger totals 2005–2019 (millions)

Traffic statistics at Doncaster Sheffield
Year	Passengers handled	Passenger % change	Cargo (tonnes)	Cargo % change	Aircraft movements	Aircraft % change
2005	600,907	Steady	31	Steady	6,914	Steady
2006	900,067	▲49.8	167	▲438.7	10,642	▲53.9
2007	1,078,374	▲19.8	1,602	▲859.3	12,667	▲19.0
2008	968,481	▼10.2	1,350	▼15.7	13,066	▲3.1
2009	835,768	▼13.7	344	▼74.5	10,854	▼16.9
2010	876,153	▲4.8	216	▼37.2	11,030	▲1.6
2011	822,877	▼6.1	102	▼52.8	11,876	▲7.7
2012	693,661	▼15.7	276	▲170.6	11,724	▼1.3
2013	690,351	▼0.5	354	▲28.3	11,197	▼4.5
2014	724,885	▲5.0	858	▲142.4	11,697	▲4.5
2015	857,109	▲18.2	3,201	▲273.1	11,998	▲2.6
2016	1,255,907	▲46.5	9,341	▲191.8	16,098	▲34.2
2017	1,335,590	▲6.3	8,656	▼7.3	17,435	▲8.3
2018	1,222,347	▼8.4	7,107	▼17.8	18,930	▲8.5
2019	1,407,862	▲15.2	17,647	▲148.3	23,043	▲21.7

=== Busiest routes ===
20 busiest routes to and from Doncaster Sheffield Airport (2019)
Rank	Airport	Passengers handled	% change 2018–19
1	Bucharest	96,612	▲52.0
2	Katowice	82,279	▲1.1
3	Gdańsk	80,842	▲10.1
4	Alicante	68,583	▲9.7
5	Warsaw	67,711	▼1.5
6	Vilnius	58,793	▲43.3
7	Palma de Mallorca	55,197	▲4.4
8	Poznań	54,514	▲7.9
9	Tenerife–South	51,309	▼0.6
10	Amsterdam	48,840	▼16.2
11	Riga	43,937	▲3.6
12	Málaga	42,299	▼12.5
13	Budapest	42,116	▲592.6
14	Cluj Napoca	41,165	▲14.3
15	Lanzarote	39,993	▲1.5
16	Kraków	39,345	n/a
17	Wroclaw	35,194	▼1.4
18	Debrecen	33,605	▲2187.6
19	Dublin	29,779	▼11.5
20	Paphos	24,528	▲9.4

== Vulcan XH558 ==
In 2011, the Vulcan to the Sky Trust flew Avro Vulcan XH558 to the airport, its former operational base. It was the last airworthy example of the Vulcan bomber fleet, restored to flight by the trust in 2007. XH558's final flight was a display over the airport, on 28 October 2015.

In 2022, the trust announced it would leave the airport because its lease could not be renewed. Nevertheless, as of October 2024, the trust and XH558 remained at the airport awaiting negotiations with a new operator.

As of October 2025, the trust had launched a new fundraising campaign, and hoped that the Vulcan could remain at Doncaster Sheffield as a static exhibit, despite the uncertain future ownership of the site.

== Ground transport ==
The airport is close to M18 motorway junction 3 and a road to it was completed in 2018.

Doncaster railway station on the East Coast Main Line, and the Frenchgate Interchange are 7 mi (11 km) away.

The airport abuts the Doncaster to Lincoln railway line, and plans for a station to replace one that closed in 1961 were granted planning permission in 2008. However, a 2012 report by Network Rail stated that more trains on the line would be required to make it viable. There have been proposals for a dedicated link to the East Coast Main Line.

== Accident ==
On 15 August 2014, a Jetstream 31 G–GAVA, operating a Links Air flight from Belfast City Airport, crashed on landing at the airport following a landing gear failure; this caused substantial damage to the aircraft. One passenger was taken to hospital with minor injuries. The airport was closed for several hours.

== In media ==
In 2007, the airport featured in the BBC Two documentary Should I Really Give Up Flying? Brian Blessed explored local attitudes to flying and its impact on the environment.

It has been a location for television series including ITV's Emmerdale, BBC One's drama Hustle and In the Club.

The airport appeared in Four Lions and was a setting for the BBC mockumentary Come Fly with Me. Matt Lucas and David Walliams spent two weeks at the airport filming.

In the 1984 TV film Threads, RAF Finningley was destroyed by a Soviet nuclear warhead.
