= Blaxton =

Village in South Yorkshire, England

Coordinates: 53.496°N 0.989°W

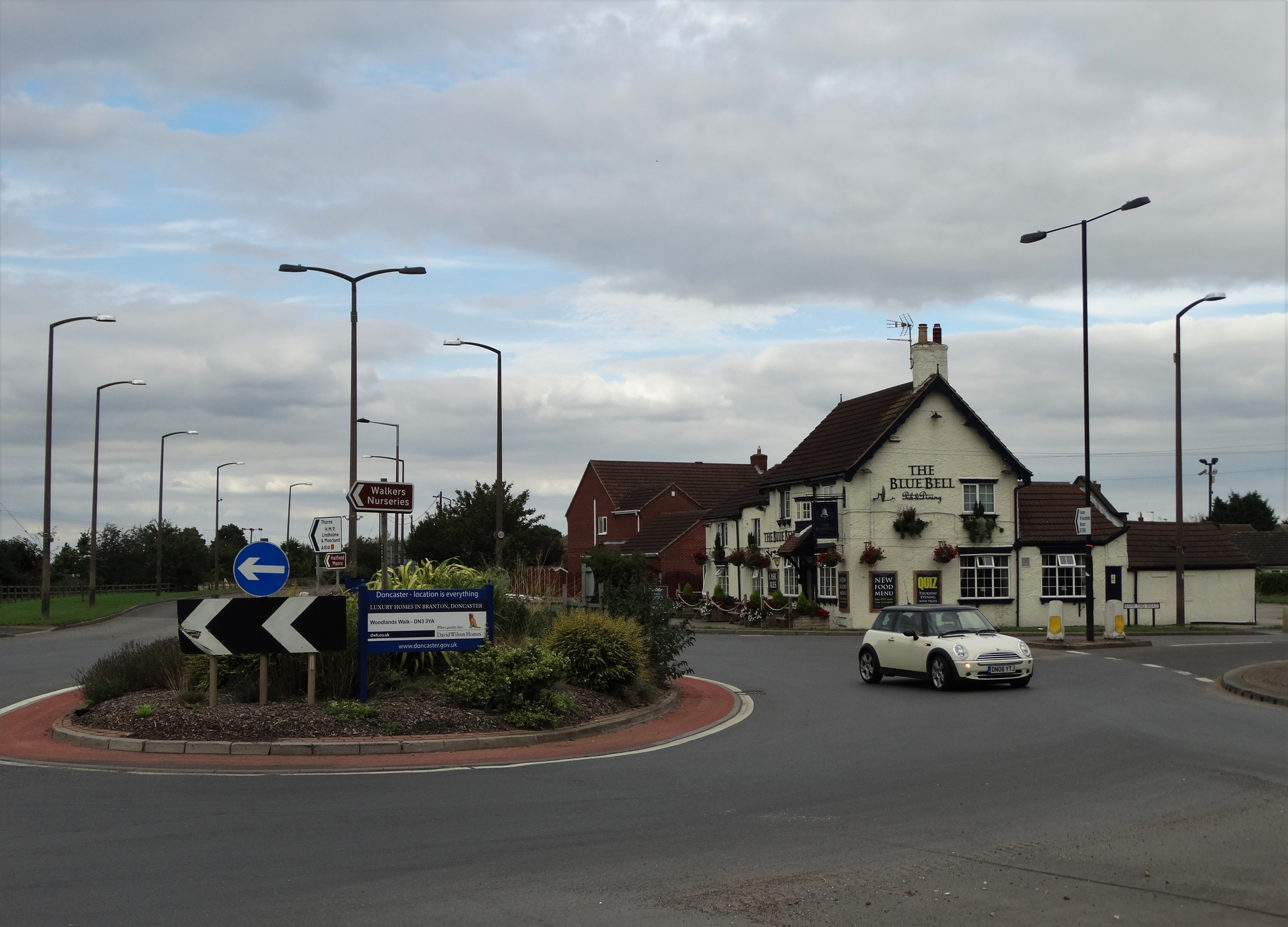
- Bluebell Inn and roundabout

- Location within South Yorkshire
- Population: 1,162 (2011 census)
- Civil parish: Blaxton
- Metropolitan borough: Doncaster
- Metropolitan county: South Yorkshire
- Region: Yorkshire and the Humber
- Country: England
- Sovereign state: United Kingdom
- Post town: DONCASTER
- Postcode district: DN9
- Dialling code: 01302
- Police: South Yorkshire
- Fire: South Yorkshire
- Ambulance: Yorkshire
- UK Parliament: Doncaster Central

Blaxton is a village in the Metropolitan Borough of Doncaster (part of South Yorkshire, England), on the border with Lincolnshire. It lies to the north of Finningley, on the A614 road, and is located at approximately 53° 29' 30" North, 0° 59' West, at an elevation of around 5 metres above sea level. It has a population of 1,179, reducing slightly to 1,162 at the 2011 Census.

Blaxton is a civil parish situated, since April 1974, in the county of South Yorkshire and in the Doncaster Metropolitan District. Before that date, it was situated in the West Riding of Yorkshire, one of the three divisions of the county of York. It lay on the southern border of the county and the name of the community derives from the name 'Blackstone'. Blaxton does not appear in the Domesday Book of 1087 and the earliest written reference dates from 1213, when it is named as 'Blacston' in the records of the central government. This spelling, or something similar, was customary for centuries. On the map in Edward Miller's History of Doncaster, published in 1805, it appears as Blakestone. The name is likely to refer to the location of a stone that traditionally marked a boundary. The boundary that it would most recently mark would be the county boundary of Yorkshire. However, the boundary it originally marked may be even more ancient, perhaps that of the southern boundary of the Anglo-Saxon kingdom of Northumbria, the kingdom `North of the Humber'. The name of the village probably received its current spelling, as with many other places, from the surveyors of the Ordnance Survey, who first put Blaxton on their first map of Yorkshire, on a scale of one inch to one mile, published on 1 February 1841. This map, incidentally, shows the boundary stone to the south-east of the village cross roads.

Blaxton was part of the soke of Hexthorpe, later known as the soke of Doncaster, another ancient institution, probably dating from the time of the Norsemen. They colonised Yorkshire under their leader Halfdan, who in the year 876 decided that it was more profitable to settle in the country that they had previously only raided. The soke was a unit of local government with its own court and Blaxton effectively remained part of the soke until 1835, when the magistrates of Doncaster ceased to exercise their jurisdiction over the village.

From the earliest times, Blaxton lay in the ecclesiastical parish of Finningley. Although part of the West Riding, Blaxton, like its neighbours Austerfield, Auckley, and Blyth were not part of the great diocese of York. They were part of the archdeaconry of Nottingham. This was part of the diocese of Lichfield then, from 1836, part of the diocese of Lincoln before becoming part of the new diocese of Southwell, to which these parishes still belonged until 2010 whence the Parishes of Finningley, Blaxton and Auckley transferred to the diocese of Sheffield.

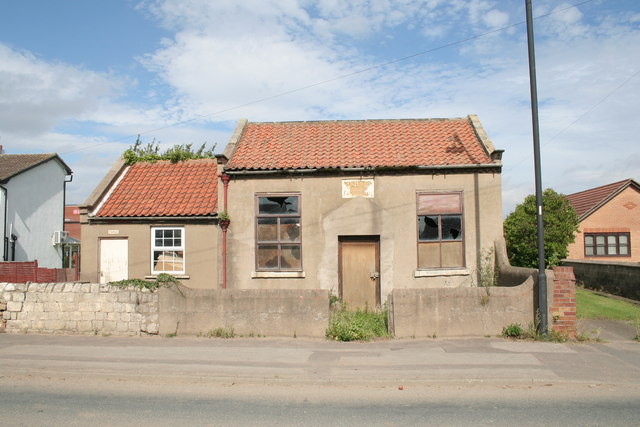
Former Wesleyan chapel at Mosham Road

Blaxton has been through its history a small rural community. In 1811, the first time its population was counted separately, it had 132 residents. There were 146 of them by the mid-century and 149 by 1901. These figures, however, disguise a picture of growth and then decline, in common with many agricultural communities in the course of the nineteenth century, as employment opportunities fluctuated and finally went into long-term decline as foreign food imports competed all too successfully with British farming.

== Listed building ==
There is one listed building in the village, the war memorial. This is in an enclosure on the north side of Bank End Road. It is in York stone, and consists of an obelisk on a four-sided plinth on a stepped base. The plinth has a moulded cornice and a pedimented cap, the pediment containing carving in relief. There are inscriptions on the obelisk and plinth, and on the plinth are the names of those lost in the two World Wars.
