= High School Leaving Certificate (India) =

Indian school qualification

The High School Leaving Certificate (HSLC) is awarded after school students successfully complete the curriculum and examinations of schools affiliated to various boards in India (i.e. when they pass 10th standard).

The awarding body is the Board of Secondary Education of the various states in India.

e.g. Board of Secondary Education, Assam.

== Trivia ==
- The HSLC admit card/certificate is actually accepted legally in India as proof of age.
- Before the passport and PAN or identity card mechanisms the HSLC admit card was the major Photo Identity in circulation.
