= Serlby Park Academy =

Location
- Whitehouse Road; Bircotes, Nottinghamshire, DN11 8EF; England; 53.4220°N 1.0530°W

Information
- Type: Academy
- Established: 2005
- Department for Education URN: 137141 Tables
- Ofsted: Reports
- Gender: Mixed
- Age: 3 to 16
- Enrolment: 831
- Website: http://serlbyparkacademy.org.uk/

Serlby Park Academy is a mixed all-through school located in the twin villages of Bircotes and Harworth in North Nottinghamshire. The school also serves the nearby towns of Serlby, Styrrup, Blyth, Misson, and among others.

It is part of the Delta Academies Trust, along with several other schools and academies in the area.

== Facilities ==
As of 2016, the school operates from one purpose built site containing all students from infant and nursery (ages 3–7), primary (ages 7–11), and secondary (ages 11–16) stages of education. Serlby Park is also part of (and one of the sites making up) the Doncaster Collegiate Sixth Form, which provides the education provision for students aged 16–18.

== Academic performance and inspections ==
As of 2024, the school's most recent inspection by Ofsted was in 2023, with a judgment of Good.

== History ==
The school was established in September 2005 as a result of the amalgamation of three schools Bircotes and Harworth Community School (secondary), North Border Junior School, and North Border Infant and Nursery School. Before the school acquired funding for the new building, there had been an attempt in 2009 to close the secondary school to fill places at Retford Oaks Academy, a school approximately 10 miles away from the existing site.
