= Grade I listed buildings in South Yorkshire =

There are 62 Grade I listed buildings in South Yorkshire, England. In the United Kingdom, the term listed building refers to a building or other structure officially designated as being of special architectural, historical or cultural significance; Grade I structures are those considered to be "buildings of exceptional interest". In England, the authority for listing under the Planning (Listed Buildings and Conservation Areas) Act 1990 rests with Historic England, a non-departmental public body sponsored by the Department for Culture, Media and Sport.

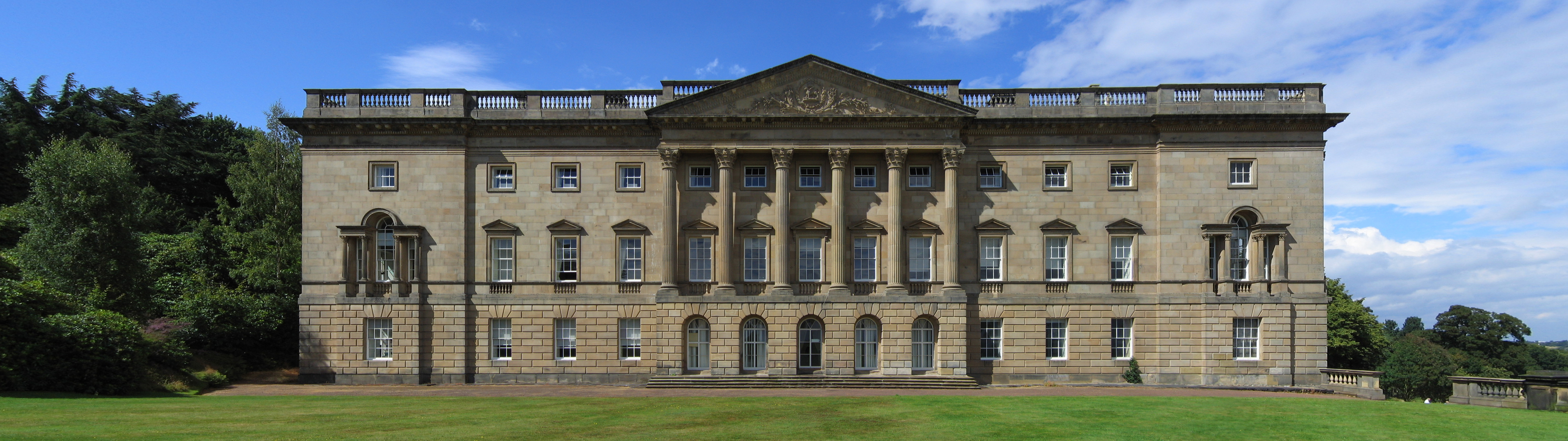
The South Front of Wentworth Castle, a Grade I listed building near Barnsley

== Listing by metropolitan boroughs ==
The metropolitan county of South Yorkshire is made up of four metropolitan boroughs: Barnsley, Doncaster, Rotherham and Sheffield. The Grade I listed buildings in each borough are shown separately.

=== Barnsley ===
Name	Location	Type	Architect	Completed (Note: The date given is the date used by Historic England as significant for the initial building or that of an important part in the structure's description.)	Date designated	Grid ref. (Note: The grid reference is based on the British national grid reference system, sometimes known as OSGB36, used by the Ordnance Survey.) Geo-coordinates	Entry number (Note: The "List Entry Number" is a unique number assigned to each listed building and scheduled monument by Historic England.)	Image	Ref.
Gunthwaite Hall Barn	Gunthwaite Lane, Gunthwaite	Barn		c. 1800	25 February 1952	SE2378506567; 53°33′19″N 1°38′33″W	1151106	Gunthwaite Hall Barn More images	
Wortley Top Forge	Cote Lane, Hunshelf	Bloomery		Early 17th century	18 March 1968	SK2944699872; 53°29′41″N 1°33′27″W	1315032	Wortley Top Forge More images	
St John the Baptist, Penistone	Market Place, Penistone	Church		15th century	23 June 1965	SE2465103316; 53°31′33″N 1°37′47″W	1314709	St John the Baptist, Penistone More images	
All Saints, Silkstone	High Street, Silkstone	Church		15th century	18 March 1968	SE2908605844; 53°32′54″N 1°33′45″W	1151740	All Saints, Silkstone More images	
Wentworth Castle	Wentworth Castle, Stainborough	House	William Wentworth and Charles Ross	c. 1760	25 February 1952	SE3199703182; 53°31′28″N 1°31′08″W	1151065	Wentworth Castle More images	
Administration building at Monk Bretton Priory	Abbey Lane, Barnsley	Guest House		1281–1538	6 February 1952	SE3730106592; 53°33′17″N 1°26′18″W	1151179	Administration building at Monk Bretton Priory More images	
All Saints, Darton	Church Street, Darton	Church	Thomas de Tykyll	16th century	13 November 1963	SE3111009915; 53°35′06″N 1°31′54″W	1286515	All Saints, Darton More images	
All Saints, Darfield	Church Street, Darfield	Church		15th century	14 October 1964	SE4188004306; 53°32′01″N 1°22′11″W	1315015	All Saints, Darfield More images	
St Andrew the Apostle, Bolton upon Dearne	High Street, Bolton upon Dearne	Church		14th century	23 August 1963	SE4558502526; 53°31′03″N 1°18′50″W	1191492	St Andrew the Apostle, Bolton upon Dearne More images	
St John the Baptist, Royston	Church Street, Royston	Church		15th century	13 October 1986	SE3642311243; 53°35′47″N 1°27′04″W	1151127	St John the Baptist, Royston More images	
St Mary, Worsborough	Worsborough	Church		15th century	11 November 1966	SE3496702622; 53°31′09″N 1°28′27″W	1315083	St Mary, Worsborough More images	
Gatehouse to Monk Bretton Priory	Abbey Lane, Barnsley	Porters Lodge		Late 16th century	6 February 1952	SE3726106600; 53°33′17″N 1°26′21″W	1315023	Gatehouse to Monk Bretton Priory More images	
Monk Bretton Priory Remains	Abbey Lane, Barnsley	Priory		15th century	6 February 1952	SE3732706463; 53°33′13″N 1°26′17″W	1151178	Monk Bretton Priory Remains More images	

=== Doncaster ===
Name	Location	Type	Architect	Completed	Date designated	Grid ref. Geo-coordinates	Entry number	Image	Ref.
St Peter, Barnburgh	Barnburgh, Doncaster	Church		15th century	5 June 1968	SE4841303211; 53°31′24″N 1°16′16″W	1151675	St Peter, Barnburgh More images	
St Peter and St Paul, Barnby Dun	Church Road, Barnby Dun	Church		15th century	5 June 1968	SE6141909730; 53°34′50″N 1°04′26″W	1151488	St Peter and St Paul, Barnby Dun More images	
Church of St Nicholas, Bawtry	Church Road, Bawtry	Church		15th century	5 June 1968	SK6532592992; 53°25′47″N 1°01′06″W	1314824	Church of St Nicholas, Bawtry More images	
Brodsworth Hall	Brodsworth	Country House	Chevalier Casentini and Philip Wilkinson	1861–1863	5 June 1968	SE5059507044; 53°33′27″N 1°14′16″W	1191614	Brodsworth Hall More images	
St Helen, Burghwallis	Grange Lane, Burghwallis	Church		12th century	5 June 1968	SE5369712026; 53°36′07″N 1°11′24″W	1151457	St Helen, Burghwallis More images	
St Peter, Edlington	Edlington Lane, Edlington	Church		15th century	5 June 1968	SK5324997253; 53°28′10″N 1°11′57″W	1286332	St Peter, Edlington More images	
Holy Trinity and St Oswald, Finningley	Rectory Lane, Finningley	Church		15th century	11 January 1988	SK6695399138; 53°29′05″N 0°59′33″W	1286821	Holy Trinity and St Oswald, Finningley More images	
St Cuthbert, Fishlake	Church Lane, Fishlake	Church		15th century	24 November 1966	SE6563113176; 53°36′40″N 1°00′34″W	1314801	St Cuthbert, Fishlake More images	
St Lawrence, Hatfield	Station Road, Hatfield	Church	Edwin Dolby	12th century	24 November 1966	SE6630109586; 53°34′43″N 1°00′00″W	1192628	St Lawrence, Hatfield More images	
Hatfield Manor House	Manor Road, Hatfield	Hall House		12th century	13 December 1951	SE6631309331; 53°34′35″N 1°00′00″W	1151589	Upload Photo	
St Wilfrid, Hickleton	Hickleton	Church		16th century	5 June 1968	SE4830005301; 53°32′32″N 1°16′21″W	1314784	St Wilfrid, Hickleton More images	
All Saints, Hooton Pagnell	Hooton Pagnell, Doncaster	Church		14th century	5 June 1968	SE4854207951; 53°33′57″N 1°16′07″W	1314808	All Saints, Hooton Pagnell More images	
St Helen, Marr	Church Lane, Marr	Church		14th century	5 June 1968	SE5145405338; 53°32′32″N 1°13′30″W	1192644	St Helen, Marr More images	
St Mary Magdalene, Norton	High Street, Campsall	Church		15th century	5 June 1968	SE5447614076; 53°37′13″N 1°10′40″W	1151464	St Mary Magdalene, Norton More images	
Old Rectory, Norton	High Street, Campsall	House		c. 1400	5 June 1968	SE5441214055; 53°37′13″N 1°10′44″W	1286761	Upload Photo	
All Saints, Owston	Owston	Church	George Gilbert Scott	15th century	5 June 1968	SE5510411172; 53°35′39″N 1°10′08″W	1192336	All Saints, Owston More images	
St Mary, Sprotborough	Sprotborough	Church		14th century	5 June 1968	SE5395802034; 53°30′44″N 1°11′16″W	1192663	St Mary, Sprotborough More images	
Cusworth Hall	Sprotborough	Country House	George Platt and James Paine	1740–1745	27 May 1953	SE5464003902; 53°31′44″N 1°10′38″W	1192735	Cusworth Hall More images	
St Nicholas, Thorne	Stonegate, Thorne	Church		15th century	24 November 1966	SE6897513263; 53°36′41″N 0°57′32″W	1193076	St Nicholas, Thorne More images	
St Mary, Tickhill	St Mary's Road, Tickhill	Parish Church		1390s	27 December 1962	SK5917493086; 53°25′52″N 1°06′39″W	1151698	St Mary, Tickhill More images	
St John the Baptist, Wadworth	Wadworth, Doncaster	Church		15th century	5 June 1968	SK5687897068; 53°28′02″N 1°08′41″W	1151504	St John the Baptist, Wadworth More images	
Wadworth Hall and attached wing walls	Wadworth	House	James Paine	c. 1750	5 June 1968	SK5671197258; 53°28′08″N 1°08′50″W	1314863	Wadworth Hall and attached wing walls More images	
All Saints Church, Arksey	Church Lane, Arksey	Church		15th century	10 December 1959	SE5792106926; 53°33′21″N 1°07′38″W	1191878	All Saints Church, Arksey More images	
St John the Baptist, Mexborough	Church Street, Mexborough	Church		15th century	11 April 1986	SK4797599741; 53°29′32″N 1°16′42″W	1151642	St John the Baptist, Mexborough More images	
St Peter, Conisbrough	Church Street, Conisbrough	Church		15th century	5 November 1962	SK5122098754; 53°28′59″N 1°13′47″W	1192787	St Peter, Conisbrough More images	
Conisbrough Castle	Conisbrough	Castle		c. 1180	26 November 1987	SK5145198901; 53°29′04″N 1°13′34″W	1192747	Conisbrough Castle More images	
St George, Doncaster	Church Lane, Doncaster	Parish Church	George Gilbert Scott	1854-8	12 June 1950	SE5741703562; 53°31′32″N 1°08′07″W	1151447	St George, Doncaster More images	
Mansion House and attached railings	High Street, Doncaster	House	James Paine and William Lindley	1748	12 June 1950	SE5750403273; 53°31′23″N 1°08′03″W	1151426	Mansion House and attached railings More images	

=== Rotherham ===
Name	Location	Type	Architect	Completed	Date designated	Grid ref. Geo-coordinates	Entry number	Image	Ref.
All Saints, Aston cum Aughton	Church Lane, Aston cum Aughton	Church		15th century	29 March 1968	SK4681685251; 53°21′43″N 1°17′53″W	1151917	All Saints, Aston cum Aughton More images	
Catcliffe Glass Cone	Catcliffe, Rotherham	Glass Cone		c. 1740	29 March 1968	SK4254588614; 53°23′34″N 1°21′42″W	1132732	Catcliffe Glass Cone More images	
St John, Dinnington	St John's Road, Dinnington	Church		15th century	15 October 1986	SK5232087572; 53°22′57″N 1°12′54″W	1132698	St John, Dinnington More images	
All Hallows, Harthill	Union Street, Harthill	Church	15th century	c. 1200	29 July 1966	SK4936880961; 53°19′24″N 1°15′37″W	1132709	All Hallows, Harthill More images	
All Saints, Laughton-en-le-Morthen	Church Corner, Laughton-en-le-Morthen	Church		14th century	29 March 1968	SK5170288206; 53°23′17″N 1°13′27″W	1193267	All Saints, Laughton-en-le-Morthen More images	
Sandbeck Park	Maltby	Country House	James Paine	c. 1760	13 November 1959	SK5690190269; 53°24′22″N 1°08′44″W	1314665	Sandbeck Park More images	
St James, Anston	Sheffield Road, Anston	Church		14th century	29 July 1966	SK5196483704; 53°20′52″N 1°13′15″W	1192792	St James, Anston More images	
St Peter, Thorpe Salvin	Harthill Road, Thorpe Salvin	Church		14th century	29 July 1966	SK5204681151; 53°19′29″N 1°13′12″W	1314667	St Peter, Thorpe Salvin More images	
St Helen, Treeton	Church Lane, Treeton	Church		15th century	29 March 1968	SK4325187709; 53°23′04″N 1°21′04″W	1132728	St Helen, Treeton More images	
The Rockingham Mausoleum including obelisks and railed enclosure	Cortwood Lane, Wentworth	Mausoleum	John Carr of York	1784–93	29 April 1968	SK4135497030; 53°28′06″N 1°22′43″W	1286386	The Rockingham Mausoleum including obelisks and railed enclosure More images	
Stable Block and Riding School	Wentworth Woodhouse, Wentworth	Stables	John Carr of York	1789	29 April 1952	SK3935597857; 53°28′34″N 1°24′31″W	1203779	Stable Block and Riding School More images	
Wentworth Woodhouse	Wentworth	Country House	William Etty, Ralph Tunnicliffe, Henry Flitcroft and John Carr of York	1734	29 April 1952	SK3960897659; 53°28′27″N 1°24′17″W	1132769	Wentworth Woodhouse More images	
Rotherham Bridge	Bridge Street, Rotherham	Bridge	John Platt	15th century	19 October 1951	SK4274093061; 53°25′57″N 1°21′29″W	1191884	Rotherham Bridge More images	
Chapel of Our Lady, Rotherham	Bridge Street, Rotherham	Chapel		1824–1888	19 October 1951	SK4274093068; 53°25′58″N 1°21′29″W	1132738	Chapel of Our Lady, Rotherham More images	
All Saints, Wath-upon-Dearne	Church Street, Wath-upon-Dearne	Church		14th century	13 November 1962	SE4325300888; 53°30′10″N 1°20′58″W	1132786	All Saints, Wath-upon-Dearne More images	
All Saints, Rotherham	Church Street, Rotherham	Church		16th century	19 October 1951	SK4284092879; 53°25′51″N 1°21′24″W	1132733	All Saints, Rotherham More images	

=== Sheffield ===
Name	Location	Type	Architect	Completed	Date designated	Grid ref. Geo-coordinates	Entry number	Image	Ref.
St Nicholas, Bradfield	Towngate, Bradfield	Church		15th century	25 April 1969	SK2671892542; 53°25′44″N 1°35′58″W	1192617	St Nicholas, Bradfield More images	
St Mary, Ecclesfield	Church Street, Ecclesfield	Church		15th century	25 April 1969	SK3530294221; 53°26′37″N 1°28′12″W	1192775	St Mary, Ecclesfield More images	
Abbeydale Industrial Hamlet	Abbeydale Road South, Sheffield	Crucible Furnace		c1800-1830	1 May 1952	SK3259781939; 53°20′00″N 1°30′43″W	1246418	Abbeydale Industrial Hamlet More images	
Sheffield Cathedral	Church Street, Sheffield	Cathedral	William Flockton, Charles Nicholson, etc.	1480s	1 May 1952	SK3538187490; 53°22′59″N 1°28′10″W	1247080	Sheffield Cathedral More images	
Sheffield Town Hall	Pinstone Street, Sheffield	Town Hall	E. W. Mountford	1890–1897	28 June 1973	SK3536187189; 53°22′49″N 1°28′12″W	1246902	Sheffield Town Hall More images	

== See also ==
- Category:Grade I listed buildings in South Yorkshire
- Scheduled Monument
- Conservation in the United Kingdom
- Listed buildings in Sheffield
- List of tallest buildings in Sheffield

== Notes ==
^{A} Sometimes known as OSGB36, the grid reference is based on the British national grid reference system, and is the system used by the Ordnance Survey.
^{B} Images of England, funded by English Heritage and the Heritage Lottery Fund, is a photographic record of England's listed buildings, but it is not an up-to-date record. The listing status and descriptions shown are as at February 2001.
