= Hatfield Manor House =

Grade I listed house in South Yorkshire, England

Coordinates: 53.5765°N 0.9995°W

Hatfield Manor House is a remodelled 18th-century Grade-I listed manor house in the town of Hatfield near Doncaster, South Yorkshire, which is based on an originally 12th-century building.

The building is constructed of roughcast ashlar and brick with a Welsh slate roof. It is built to a T-shaped plan in 2 and 3 storeys.

The building is not open to the public. The entrance is marked by two modern gatehouses on Manor Road, and the early 18th-century stables are clearly visible from the road.

== History ==
The Hatfield site is believed to be the site of the palace of Edwin of Northumbria, who allegedly died at the Battle of Hatfield Chase, the location of which is disputed.

Hatfield was granted to the Warenne family c. 1070, and the house must have been built by them prior to 1317. It reverted to the Crown in 1347 when the Warenne male line became extinct and was used as a hunting lodge for most of the next 300 years. William of Hatfield, the second son of King Edward III, was born in the house in 1336, but died in infancy.

In 1628, the estate was granted by King Charles I to Sir Cornelius Vermuyden, who had been responsible for draining the lands around Hatfield. He sold it in 1630 to Sir Arthur Ingram of Temple Newsam, in whose family it remained for several generations. Arthur Ingram's lineal descendant, the 9th and last Viscount Irvine, died in 1778 without an heir and bequeathed the estate to Lady Beauchamp, afterwards Marchioness of Hertford, from whom it passed to Lady William Gordon.

The house was extended in the 16th and 17th centuries and completely remodelled in the 18th century.

== See also ==
- Grade I listed buildings in South Yorkshire
- Listed buildings in Hatfield, South Yorkshire
