= St Peter's Church, Barnburgh =

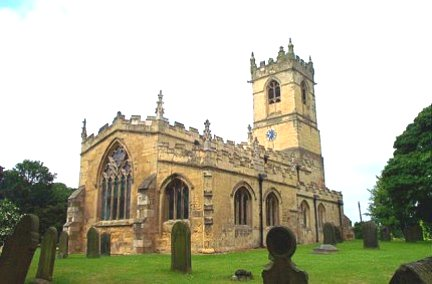
- St Peter's Church, Barnburgh
- 53.5234°N 1.2712°W
- OS grid reference: SE 48413 03211
- Denomination: Church of England
- Churchmanship: Broad Church
- Website: www.barnburghandharlington.co.uk

History
- Dedication: St Peter

Architecture
- Heritage designation: Grade I
- Designated: 5 June 1968

Administration
- Province: York
- Diocese: Sheffield
- Archdeaconry: Doncaster
- Deanery: Wath
- Parish: Barnburgh

Clergy
- Priest: The Revd Canon Kathryn Herrod

St Peter's Church, Barnburgh is a parish church of the Church of England situated at the centre of the village of Barnburgh, near Doncaster in South Yorkshire. Famous for the legend of the 'Cat and Man', the church serves the communities of Barnburgh and Harlington. It is a Grade I listed building.

== Construction ==
St Peter's consists of a tower of four stages surmounted by a small, squat spire, a nave with north and south aisles, a chancel with a north aisle or chapel, and a porch. The church is built of a mixture of sandstone and magnesium limestone.

Although there has been a church on this site since c. 1150 AD, nothing remains of the original church.

There is a private chantry chapel north of the chancel for the Cresacre family, whose males were lords of Barnburgh from the 13th to the 16th century. Most of this chapel is taken up by the tomb of Sir Percival Cresacre (who died in 1477) and his wife, Alice (died 1450).

== Cat and Man Legend ==
The Cat and Man Legend tells of events said to have occurred before the 15th century. There was formerly a hall at Barnburgh which was in the possession of the Cresacre family. According to the legend, a knight of the Cresacre family (reputedly Sir Percival Cresacre, but this is disputed) was returning home late on the heavily wooded track from Doncaster through Sprotborough and High Melton.

As he was approaching Barnburgh, a wildcat (or a lynx) sprang out of the branches of a tree and landed on the back of his horse. The horse threw its rider to the ground and fled. The cat then turned on the knight and there followed a long and deadly struggle between the two which continued all the way from Ludwell Hill to Barnburgh.

After fighting the cat the mile's distance to the village of Barnburgh, the knight made for the porch of St Peter's Church, presumably to try to get inside the church and close the door on the animal. The fight had been so fierce, however, that Sir Percival fell dying in the church porch and, in his last, dying struggle, stretched out his feet and crushed the cat against the wall of the porch.

Thus, the legend goes, the cat killed the man and the man killed the cat. They were found sometime later by the search party that went out after the knight's horse had returned home riderless.

Stones in the floor of the porch of St Peter's are tainted with red. There is also a cat at the feet of the Cresacre effigy in the north aisle of the church.

== See also ==
- Grade I listed buildings in South Yorkshire
- Listed buildings in Barnburgh
