= Listed buildings in Norton and Askern =

Norton is a civil parish, and Norton and Askern is a ward, in the metropolitan borough of Doncaster, South Yorkshire, England. The parish and ward contain 27 listed buildings that are recorded in the National Heritage List for England. Of these, two are listed at Grade I, the highest of the three grades, and the others are at Grade II, the lowest grade. The parish and ward contain the villages of Norton, Campsall, Skellow, and Sutton and the surrounding countryside. Most of the listed buildings are houses, cottages and associated structures, farmhouses and farm buildings. The other listed buildings include a church, three cross bases, two bridges, a former windmill, a former watermill, a public house, two mileposts, a former toll house, and a village pump.

== Key ==
Grade	Criteria
I	Particularly important buildings of more than special interest
II	Buildings of national importance and special interest

== Buildings ==
Name and location	Photograph	Date	Notes	Grade
St Mary Magdalene's Church, Campsall; 53.62041°N 1.17787°W		12th century	The church was altered and extended through the centuries, and between 1871 and 1874 an extensive restoration was carried out by George Gilbert Scott. The church is built in magnesian limestone with roofs of lead and stone slate, and has retained many Norman features. It has a cruciform plan, consisting of a nave with a clerestory, north and south aisles, a south porch, north and south transepts, a chancel, and a west tower embraced by the aisles. The tower has buttresses, a 12th-century west doorway that has three orders of colonnettes with scalloped capitals and zig-zag ornament. Above this is a blind arcade of five arches, a single-light window, a clock face, pairs of two-light bell openings with central shafts, a string course, and an embattled parapet with truncated corner pinnacles. Along the nave is an embattled parapet, and the east window has five lights.	I
Cross base, St Mary Magdalene's Church; 53.62029°N 1.17771°W	—	Late medieval	The cross base in the churchyard to the south of the church is in magnesian limestone. It is about 0.8 metres (2 ft 7 in) square, rising to an octagon with rounded chamfer stops. On the top is a large socket.	II
Cross base, Hill House; 53.61957°N 1.17922°W	—	Late medieval	The cross base is in magnesian limestone. At the bottom it is square with a chamfered lip, and it rises to an octagon with weathered corner stops. In the socket is the stump of a cross shaft.	II
The Old Rectory; 53.62023°N 1.17881°W	—	c. 1400	The rectory, later a private house, was extended and altered in about 1800, and later. It is in magnesian limestone, the later parts are pebbledashed, and it has a stone slate roof. There are two storeys, the original house had a T-shaped plan with three-bay hall block and an oblique, cross-wing, and the extensions are to the east. The entrance front has a chamfered plinth, and contains a doorway with a moulded surround and a pointed head, to the left is a two-light chamfered mullioned window, and to the right and in the upper floor are cross windows. Elsewhere, there are sash and casement windows, and a window with Perpendicular tracery.	I
Cross base, Skellow; 53.58772°N 1.20007°W	—	16th to 17th century	The cross base is on an island at a road junction. It is in magnesian limestone, and consists of three square steps, the top step a platform about 1.2 metres (3 ft 11 in) across.	II
Barn alongside South Farm Drive; 53.58693°N 1.19849°W	—	16th to 17th century	The barn has a timber framed core, it was later encased in magnesian limestone, and has quoins, stone slate eaves courses, and a pantile roof with coped gables and shaped kneelers. There is a single storey and six bays. It contains doorways and triangular vents, and has two buttresses.	II
Rose Cottage; 53.61932°N 1.17975°W	—	17th century (probable)	The house is rendered, and has overhanging eaves and a pantile roof. There are two storeys and four bays. The doorway has a chamfered quoined surround, and a lintel carved with a shield containing a coat of arms. Above it is a small window in a segmental-arched recess. The other windows are horizontally-sliding sashes, all but one in segmental arched recesses.	II
Vine Farmhouse; 53.60584°N 1.16711°W	—	1701	The farmhouse is in roughcast limestone, and has a pantile roof with coped gables and shaped kneelers. There are two storeys and an attic, three bays, and a two-storey rear wing. In the centre is a doorway with a chamfered surround, a deep lintel, and a hood mould, and above it is a single-light window. The outer bays contain three-light mullioned windows.	II
Barn end on to South Farm Drive; 53.58674°N 1.19867°W	—	Early 18th century	A barn and stable in magnesian limestone, with quoins, and a pantile roof. There are two storeys and five bays, and a lower two-bay extension to the right. The barn contains doorways, triangular vents, and hatches. In the stable are doors, windows and a hatch, all in segmental arches.	II
Stable and dovecote, Sutton Farm; 53.60537°N 1.16793°W	—	Early 18th century (probable)	The stable and dovecote are in magnesian limestone, and have a pantile roof with coped gables and shaped kneelers. There are three storeys and a single bay. In the ground floor is a doorway and a window opening, the middle floor contains a doorway, and in the top floor is a square opening. Inside, there are nesting holes.	II
Manor House and outbuilding 53.61875°N 1.18415°W	—	18th century	A farmhouse and attached outbuilding, they are roughcast, and have a pantile roof with square-cut gable copings and shaped kneelers. The house has quoins, two storeys and an attic, and five bays. Most of the windows are horizontally-sliding sashes, in the left bay they have square-cut hood moulds, and in the other bays they are under segmental brick arches. The outbuilding is recessed on the right, and has two storeys and seven bays. All the openings have segmental brick arches, and in the fourth bay is a blind oculus.	II
Cartshed and outbuildings, Campsmount Home Farm; 53.62102°N 1.19006°W	—	Mid to late 18th century	The farm buildings are in rendered stone, with eaves bands, and hipped roofs of Westmorland slate. The cartshed with hayloft has two storeys and eight bays, and the outbuilding is at right angles, with a single storey, and an L-shaped plan with fronts of three and five bays. On the front of the cartshed are two-storey round-arched openings on square piers with plinths and impost blocks, and at the rear are external steps to an upper floor doorway with flanking oculi. The outbuilding contains garage doors with squarer piers, and doorways, some of which are blocked.	II
Barn and cowhouse, Campsmount Home Farm; 53.62164°N 1.19035°W	—	Late 18th century	The farm buildings, designed by John Carr, are in stone with eaves bands and hipped roofs of asbestos sheet, consist of a barn with three storeys and five bays, and, forming a wing at the front on the right, is a cowhouse with two storeys and five bays. The barn contains double doors under a segmental arch, cruciform and slit vents, and blind windows. In the cowhouse are a central door with a fanlight, casement windows, mullioned windows, and slit vents, and in the left return are five Diocletian windows.	II
Bridge, Campsmount Home Farm; 53.62112°N 1.18970°W	—	Late 18th century	The bridge at the south entrance to the farmyard carries a track over a gully, and it was designed by John Carr. The arch is in red brick, and the rest is in limestone with sandstone dressings. The bridge consists of a single basket arch, with voussoirs, a band below coped parapets ending in square piers with domed caps, and inner parapets curving to meet the end piers.	II
Summer House Farmhouse and flat 53.61195°N 1.21900°W	—	1784	A farmhouse later divided, it is rendered, on a stone plinth, with bands, embattled parapets and a tile roof, and is in Gothick style. The front has five bays, the middle three bays taller and canted, flanked by lean-to bays, and with a later rear extension. Steps lead up to the central round-arched doorway with a fanlight. The windows are sashes, in the ground floor with pointed-arched heads, and in the upper floor with trefoil heads. In the upper part of each bay is a blind quatrefoil.	II
The Windmill; 53.62680°N 1.18742°W		c. 1800	The former tower windmill has been converted for residential use. It is in roughcast brick with a felted dome, and has been capped with an ogee-domed roof. There are four storeys, it consists of a truncated cone, and contains openings including casement windows in segmental brick arches.	II
Campsmount Home Farm Cottages; 53.62207°N 1.19043°W	—	Late 18th to early 19th century	A house, later divided, it is rendered, with a floor band, an eaves band, and a hipped tile roof with a coped parapet. There are two storeys and five bays, the middle three bays forming a canted projection. In the centre is a French window with a fanlight, the windows in the side bays are in recesses flanked by piers, and the upper floor contains sash windows. The outer bays have catslide roofs and piers with ball finials.	II
South Farm House; 53.58801°N 1.19935°W	—	1803	The farmhouse is in stone, the main block rendered, with a hipped Welsh slate roof. The main block has two storeys and four bays, to the left and recessed is a lower two-storey two-bay wing, and beyond that is a single-storey extension. In the ground floor of the main block the openings are in round-arched recesses, the doorway with a semicircular fanlight, and the windows with round heads. All the windows are sashes, those in the upper floor with flat heads. Above the doorway is an inscribed and dated plaque. The wing has a tile roof, and contains a doorway with a segmental head and sash windows, and in the extension is a stable door and a casement window.	II
Gateway and walls, Hill House; 53.61960°N 1.17926°W	—	Early 19th century (probable)	The wall is in magnesian limestone and is coped. It contains a round-headed door in a square-headed surround, with projecting piers. The concave wing walls sweep down to similar end piers; each pier has a band under a pyramidal cap.	II
Mill building, Priory Mill; 53.63640°N 1.18261°W	—	Early 19th century	A water-powered corn mill, it is partly roughcast, with stone slate eaves courses, and a pantile roof. There are two storeys and a loft, two bays, and a single-storey wheelhouse over the mill race to the north. The wheelhouse has a central doorway, and in the right return is an arch with a keystone.	II
Tanpit Bridge; 53.63939°N 1.17236°W		Early 19th century	The bridge carries Stubbs Lane over the River Went, and is in stone with a brick-lined soffit. It consists of a single segmental arch, and has a raised keystone, a band under the parapets that have chamfered copings, and step up to a block at each end.	II
The Old Bells, The Chimneys and flat 53.61916°N 1.17973°W		Early 19th century	A public house and a private house with a flat, they are roughcast and have pantile roofs. There are two storeys and nine bays. The middle bay is taller, it projects under a pedimented gable, it has a round-arched recess with an impost band, and contains sash windows. The public house to the left has two doorways and horizontally-sliding sash windows under segmental arches. The house to the right has a coped gable, and contains a doorway and ground floor windows with square heads, and upper floor windows with segmental heads. The windows are a mix of sashes and casements.	II
Retaining wall, The Old Rectory; 53.62002°N 1.17865°W	—	Early 19th century (probable)	The garden retaining wall runs along the roadside. It is in magnesian limestone, and between 3 metres (9.8 ft) and 4 metres (13 ft) high. The wall has domed copings, and projecting piers with ogee-domed caps.	II
Milepost by River Went; 53.63867°N 1.14665°W		1832–33	The milestone is on the east side of Selby Road (A19 road) by the bridge over the River Went. It is in magnesian limestone, and consists of a short rectangular pillar with a rounded head. On it are inscribed the distances to Doncaster, Askern, Selby, and York.	II
Milepost by Sixteen Acre Plantation; 53.58370°N 1.15423°W		1832–33	The milestone is on the east side of Selby Road (A19 road) by the Sixteen Acre Plantation. It is in magnesian limestone, and consists of a short rectangular pillar with a triangular head. On it are inscribed the distances to Doncaster, Askern, Selby, and York.	II
Toll Bar Cottage; 53.62814°N 1.14901°W		1832–33 (probable)	The former toll house is rendered, with overhanging eaves, and a hipped Welsh slate roof. There is a single storey and five bays, the middle three bays projecting and canted. The windows are casements.	II
Village pump 53.63063°N 1.17543°W	—	Mid 19th century	The village pump is in cast iron. It has a cylindrical shaft with three annulets, and a spout over an iron trough.	II
