= Campsall =

Village in South Yorkshire, England

Coordinates: 53.623°N 1.177°W

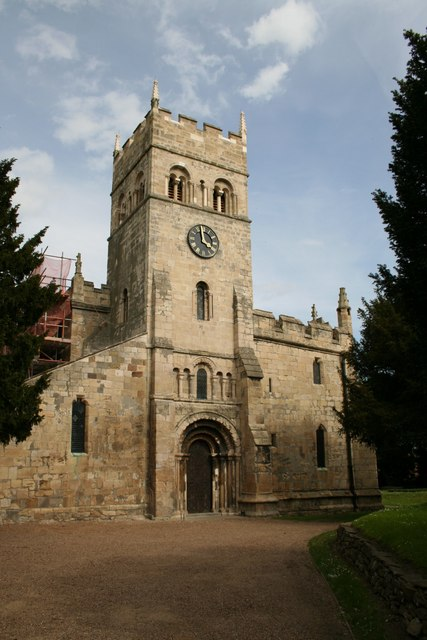
- St Mary Magdalene's church, Campsall

- Location within South Yorkshire
- Area: 0.5760 km^{2} (0.2224 sq mi)
- Population: 1,878 (2021 census)
  - Density: 3,260/km^{2} (8,400/sq mi)
- OS grid reference: SE545140
- Civil parish: Norton
- Metropolitan borough: Doncaster
- Metropolitan county: South Yorkshire
- Region: Yorkshire and the Humber
- Country: England
- Sovereign state: United Kingdom
- Post town: DONCASTER
- Postcode district: DN6
- Dialling code: 01302
- Police: South Yorkshire
- Fire: South Yorkshire
- Ambulance: Yorkshire
- UK Parliament: Doncaster North

Campsall is a village in the civil parish of Norton, in the Doncaster district, in the county of South Yorkshire, England. It lies 7 miles (11 km) to the north-west of Doncaster, at an elevation of around 50 feet above sea level. The village contains Campsall Country Park. The village falls within the Norton & Askern ward of Doncaster Council and the House of Commons constituency of Doncaster North. The Parish is situated on the “Magnesian Limestone Belt”, a landscape feature formed by a narrow north–south trending escarpment. The Magnesian Limestone Belt is typified by well drained and fertile soils, which were ideal for agriculture and the establishment of settlements like Campsall. Before the Industrial Revolution, the area to the east was occupied by the inaccessible and waterlogged marshes of the Humberhead Levels, whilst to the west was the Barnsdale Forest, an area associated with the legend of Robin Hood and various outlaws and bandits who preyed upon travellers on the Great North Road. In 2021 it had a population of 1878.

== History ==
The name Campsall probably derives from the Old English camshalh meaning 'Cam's nook of land'. Alternatively, the first element could be derived from the Primitive Welsh camm meaning 'crooked'.

Following the departure of the Romans, who had a small fort two miles to the west which guarded the crossing of the River Skell by the Great North Road, an early wooden Saxon church was established at Campsall, although nothing of this remains today. Following the Conquest a large Norman church was built out of local stone to serve the local population who were engaged with agricultural and rural employment during the mediaeval period. During this time Campsall was rapidly growing in importance and was granted a royal charter in 1294 entitling it to a weekly Thursday market and an annual four-day fair. These had ceased by 1627. A public house, the Ring of Bells (now called the Old Bells) was opened near the church and this pub is believed to be one of the oldest in Yorkshire.

During the 18th century, the village was dominated by the landed gentry. At opposite ends of the village, the Bacon-Franks constructed Campsall Hall and the Cooke-Yarboroughs built Campsmount. The villagers were still mostly employed with farming and working on the two estates, and even the establishment of nearby Askern Colliery in 1910 had little impact on the work force of Campsall.

Campsall was historically a large parish in the West Riding of Yorkshire. The ancient parish included the townships of Norton, Sutton, Askern, Fenwick, and Moss, all of which became separate civil parishes in 1866. The civil parish of Campsall was abolished on 1 April 1938, and merged into the parish of Norton. In 1931 the parish had a population of 260.

It was not until the 1950s, that major changes began to affect the village. During this time, the Bacon-Franks abandoned Campsall Hall; it was rumoured that Mrs Bacon-Frank was growing tired of the view of Askern Colliery from the Hall. From 1956 the local authority and the National Coal Board developed a large area of housing in Campsall Park and Campsall Hall was converted into flats until 1986 when it was demolished. The Cooke-Yarboroughs had left Campsmount in the late 1930s, and the building was used as a military hospital until demolition in the 1950s. A private housing estate was built during the 1970s in the grounds of Campsmount Park.

== The village today ==
Today, Campsall has become established as a village of two parts. There is the old village near the church which still retains some of its rural charm, its cottages occupied by commuters who work in Leeds, Sheffield, Pontefract and Doncaster. There is also the newer part of Campsall formed in the 1950s from the Council and NCB housing projects. Askern Colliery ceased production in 1993 and after several years of relatively high unemployment the local people are beginning to find new employment opportunities, although many of the social problems associated with former mining areas remain.

Campsall hosts the secondary school Campsmount Academy, which has undergone large scale change over the years. Whilst known as 'Campmount Technology College' there were financial advantages, leading to structural development including a new sports hall named the 'David Ashton Sports Hall' after the legendary PE teacher who worked there for over 30 years. However, the school caught fire at around 1:30 a.m. on 13 December 2009, and suffered unrepairable damage, with only the 'David Ashton Sports Hall' and The Expressive Arts block/ Library surviving the devastating blaze. The new school building was completed in April 2012 and the school converted to academy status shortly afterwards.

== The Church of St Mary Magdalene, Campsall and the Robin Hood legend ==
The historian John Paul Davis wrote of the connection between Robin Hood and the Church of Saint Mary Magdalene at Campsall. The fifteenth century ballad entitled, A Gest of Robyn Hode states that Robin Hood built a chapel in Barnsdale that he dedicated to Mary Magdalene.

‘I made a chapel in Bernysdale,
That seemly is to se,
It is of Mary Magdaleyne
And thereto wolde I be’.

Davis indicates that there is only one church dedicated to Mary Magdalene within what one might reasonably consider to have been the mediaeval forest of Barnsdale, and that is the church at Campsall. The church was built in the late eleventh century by Robert de Lacy, 2nd Baron of Pontefract. Local legend suggests that Robin Hood and Maid Marion were married at the church of Saint Mary Magdalene, Campsall.

== The Society for the Acquisition of Knowledge ==
The Campsall Society for the Acquisition of Knowledge was founded in the late 1830s when the family of Mr. Charles Wood rented Campsall Hall and employed several promising young scholars – English and European – to tutor their sons Neville, Willoughby and Charles Junior. The father, Charles Thorold Wood, had been a captain in the Royal Horse Guards, and was an ornithologist. His wife, Jane, was an early adherent of homeopathy. Neville (1818–) at this time was editor of a journal called "The Naturalist", a contributor to "The Analyst" and had, in 1836, published "The Ornithologist's Text-Book" (John W. Parker, London). He later went to London and led the Homeopathic movement there. Their tutors included Giacomo (James) Chiosso, later professor of gymnastics at University College London and inventor of the Polymachinon (forerunner of the modern exercise machine), Edwin Lankester, Leonhard Schmitz and Ferdinand Moller. The Society had probably ceased to exist by the early 1840s, as the tutors had mostly moved on by this time.

== See also ==
- Listed buildings in Norton and Askern
