= Sutton, South Yorkshire =

Village in South Yorkshire, England

Coordinates: 53.605°N 1.169°W

Sutton
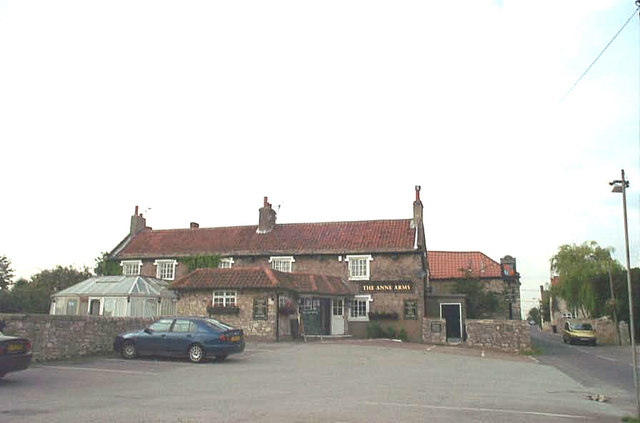
- The Anne Arms public house

- Location within South Yorkshire
- OS grid reference: SE545140
- Civil parish: Norton
- Metropolitan borough: Doncaster
- Metropolitan county: South Yorkshire
- Region: Yorkshire and the Humber
- Country: England
- Sovereign state: United Kingdom
- Post town: DONCASTER
- Postcode district: DN6
- Dialling code: 01302
- Police: South Yorkshire
- Fire: South Yorkshire
- Ambulance: Yorkshire
- UK Parliament: Doncaster North

Sutton is a small village and former civil parish, now in the parish of Norton, in the City of Doncaster in South Yorkshire, England. It lies at approximately 53° 36' 20" North, 1° 10' West, at an elevation of around 26 feet above sea level, west of Askern and south of Campsall. In 1931 the civil parish had a population of 156.

== History ==
The name "Sutton" means 'South farm/settlement'. Sutton was recorded in the Domesday Book as Sutone. Sutton was formerly a township in the parishes of Burghwallis and Campsall, from 1866 Sutton was a civil parish in its own right, on 1 April 1938 the parish was abolished and merged with Norton.

== See also ==
- Listed buildings in Norton and Askern
