= Listed buildings in Hatfield, South Yorkshire =

Hatfield is a civil parish in the metropolitan borough of Doncaster, South Yorkshire, England. The parish contains 33 listed buildings that are recorded in the National Heritage List for England. Of these, two are listed at Grade I, the highest of the three grades, and the others are at Grade II, the lowest grade. The parish contains the villages of Hatfield and Hatfield Woodhouse, and the surrounding area. Most of the listed buildings are houses, cottages and associated structures, farmhouses and farm buildings. The other listed buildings include churches and associated items, a former charity school, two former tower windmills, three mileposts, a cemetery chapel, and a RAF watch tower.

== Key ==
Grade	Criteria
I	Particularly important buildings of more than special interest
II	Buildings of national importance and special interest

== Buildings ==
Name and location	Photograph	Date	Notes	Grade
Hatfield Manor House; 53.57544°N 0.99978°W	—	12th century	Most of the house dates from the 18th century, but the two-bay west range is the hall block of a Norman house and hunting lodge. The house is in roughcast stone and brick and has a cornice and a hipped Welsh slate roof. The south front has four bays on a plinth, and it contains a porch, a French window, and sash windows. The earliest block, recessed on the left, has a chamfered plinth. In the ground floor are casement windows and an infilled 12th-century window, and the upper floor contains sashes.	I
St Lawrence's Church; 53.57870°N 1.00007°W		12th century	The church was altered and extended through the centuries, particularly in 15th century, it was altered in 1872 by Thomas Jackson, and restored in 1882 by Edwin Dolby. The church is built in pebble and limestone, with roofs of lead and slate. It has a cruciform plan, consisting of a nave with a clerestory, north and south aisles, a south porch, north and south transepts, a chancel with north and south chapels, and a tower at the crossing. The west front is Norman, and most of the rest of the church is Perpendicular with embattled parapets.	I
Barn at rear of Elmtree House; 53.56854°N 0.97865°W	—	17th century	The barn has a timber framed core, and was rebuilt in the 18th century in red brick. It has a pantile roof with coped gables, there is one storey, and three bays. On the front are central doors and vents, and at the rear is a wagon entrance.	II
Old Travis Charity School; 53.57953°N 1.00094°W	—	1682	The former charity school, which was extended in 1880, is in red brick, the older part rendered, and has a Welsh slate roof with coped gables and kneelers. There is a single storey and an L-shaped plan, with a porch in the angle. The porch incorporates the lintel and pediment from a 17th-century doorway, with a shield in the tympanum and an initialled datestone above.	II
11 and 13 Station Road; 53.57885°N 1.00101°W		1711	A pair of houses, the later one added in about 1720, at one time used as a workhouse, and with a later extension used as a shop. They are in red brick with roofs of pantile and tile. The houses have two storeys and attics, and are at right angles with two and three bays, and the shop extension has a single storey. The windows are a mix of sashes and casements.	II
Glen Cottage; 53.56675°N 0.98113°W	—	Early 18th century	A house that was altered in the 19th century, it is in rendered brick with dentilled eaves and a tile roof. There are two storeys and four bays. Above the doorway is a small casement window, and the other windows are sashes.	II
Hawthorne House; 53.57775°N 1.00113°W	—	Early 18th century	The house is in roughcast brick on a plinth, and has a Welsh slate roof. There are two storeys, a double-depth plan, three bays on the front, a lean-to on the rear right and a single-storey wing on the rear left. The central doorway has pilasters, a fanlight, and a cornice, and is flanked by two sash windows in architraves on each side, with three larger sashes in the upper floor.	II
31 Manor Road; 53.57479°N 1.00146°W		1741	A small red brick house, with an eaves band, and a pantile roof with coped gables and shaped kneelers. There is one storey and an attic, and three bays with a continuous outshut. The doorway has a blind fanlight and a datestone above, the windows are sashes, and in the attic is a gabled dormer.	II
54 High Street; 53.57801°N 0.99518°W	—	Mid 18th century	A house divided into four flats, it is roughcast, on a rendered plinth, with rusticated quoins, an eaves cornice, and a pantile roof with coped gables and shaped kneelers. There are two storeys, five bays, and two rear wings. In the centre is a stone Doric portico, and the windows are sashes with architraves. In the left return is a two-storey canted bay window with a hipped roof.	II
Ash Hill Lodge; 53.57521°N 1.00697°W	—	18th century	The house was extended by the addition of a front range in about 1800. It is in stuccoed brick, with an eaves band, and a pantile roof with coped gables and shaped kneelers. There are two storeys and attics, a double-depth plan, and three bays. In the centre is a doorway with an architrave in a trellised porch. This is flanked by bow windows, and upper floor are sash windows.	II
Bow House; 53.57415°N 1.00663°W		Mid 18th century	The house is in red brick, with cogged eaves, and a pantile roof with chamfered gable copings and shaped kneelers. There are three storeys, three bays a rear wing on the right, and lean-to additions in the angle. In the centre is a doorway with a three-pane fanlight, the outer bays contain two-storey canted bay windows, and the other windows are sashes. A stair outshut on the right contains a round-headed stair window with Gothick glazing bars.	II
Elmtree House; 53.56858°N 0.97900°W	—	18th century	The oldest part of the house is the rear wing, with the front range added in the early 19th century. The house is partly roughcast and partly in exposed brick, and has roofs of tile and pantile. There is an L-shaped plan, with a front range of two storeys and three bays, a lower rear wing with two storeys and two bays, and beyond that an extension with one storey and an attic, and one bay. The entrance front has quoins, and a cornice under a coped parapet. The central doorway has a fanlight and a cornice on consoles, and the outer bays are bowed and contain casement windows.	II
Barn, Hatfield House Farm; 53.57428°N 1.00267°W		1755	The barn is in red brick, with an eaves band, and a pantile roof with coped gables and shaped kneelers. There are two storeys and five bays. On the east side is a central door and vents, and at the rear is a doorway, three hatches, and decorative lozenge-shaped vents.	II
Broom Lodge; 53.57596°N 1.01049°W	—	Mid to late 18th century	A wing was added to the house in the 19th century. It is in painted brick on a chamfered plinth, with a floor band, an eaves cornice, and a Welsh slate roof. There are two storeys and an attic, and an L-shaped plan, consisting of a front range of five bays, and a rear wing on the right. The central doorway has a fanlight, and the windows are sashes.	II
Outbuildings, Hepworth's Yard; 53.56702°N 0.98096°W	—	Late 18th century	A combination farm building, it is in red brick, with dentilled eaves, and a pantile roof with coped gables and shaped kneelers. There are two storeys, and the building consists of a single-bay stable, a dovecote to the right, and a lower four-bay range further to the right. The doorways and windows have segmental-arched heads, and there are two square-headed hatches.	II
Stable block and coach house, Thackray House; 53.57461°N 1.00223°W	—	Late 18th century	The stable block and coach house are in red brick, with an eaves cornice, and stone slate eaves courses to a pantile roof that has coped gables. There are two storeys and four bays, the middle two bays projecting under a pedimented gable with an oculus in the tympanum, and an apex block with a weathervane. In each bay is a round-arched recess with a Diocletian surround in each upper floor. The front contains double doors and casement windows, and in the left return is a lunette.	II
The Grange; 53.57756°N 1.00124°W		Late 18th century	A house, later used for other purposes, it is in red brick on a plinth, with floor bands, a moulded eaves cornice, and a pantile roof, hipped on the left, and with a coped gable on the right. There are two storeys and an L-shaped plan, with a front range of five bays, a rear wing on the right, and infill in the angle. A deep porch protruding from the middle bay has pilaster and an open pediment, and an inner doorway with a fanlight, and the windows are sashes. In the left return is a doorway with an architrave and a cornice, canted bay windows, and a pedimented gable with an oculus.	II
The Shambles; 53.57717°N 1.00090°W		Late 18th century	A brick house on a plinth, with a floor band, a dentilled eaves course, and a hipped Welsh slate roof. There are two storeys and five bays, the middle three bays projecting under a coped pediment. The central doorway has a three-light fanlight, above it is a blind window, and the other windows are sashes. Attached on the left is a screen wall.	II
Thackray House; 53.57451°N 1.00189°W		1782	The front range was added to the house in the later 18th century. The house is in red brick with stone slate courses to a pantile roof with coped gables and shaped kneelers. There are two storeys, a front range of three bays, a lower rear wing on the left, and additions in the angle. The middle bay projects under a pedimented gable with a quatrefoil in the tympanum, and a moulded eaves cornice. It has a round-arched recess and contains a doorway with a fanlight. The windows are sashes.	II
Coach House, Hatfield House Farm; 53.57430°N 1.00318°W		1789	The coach house is in red brick with stone dressings, quoins, an eaves band, stone slate eaves courses, and a pantile roof with coped gables, shaped kneelers, and ball finials. There are two storeys and three bays, the middle bay on the west front projecting under a gable containing a ledge, and a lunette with a keystone in the tympanum. In this bay are doors under an arch with an impost band and a keystone, and the outer bays also have recessed arches. At the rear is a central blocked arched opening, with a blocked lunette above, and casement windows. In the gable ends, the tie rods spell out initials and the date.	II
Stonehill Farmhouse; 53.57313°N 0.96937°W	—	c. 1800	The farmhouse is in brick, with dentilled eaves, and a pantile roof with coped gables and shaped kneelers. There are two storeys and attics, three bays, and a rear wing on the left. In the centre is a doorway with a fanlight and a segmental head in an arched recess. The windows are casements with segmental heads; the window above the doorway is blind.	II
Cartshed and dovecote, Stonehill Farm; 53.57316°N 0.96858°W	—	c. 1800	The cartshed and dovecote are in red brick, with dentilled eaves, and a pantile roof with coped gables and shaped kneelers. There are two storeys, the dovecote has a single bay, and is flanked by two-bay arcaded cartsheds. In the upper floor are lunettes with ledges, some blind, and on the left return are external steps.	II
Bawtry Road Farmhouse; 53.56771°N 0.98016°W	—	Early 19th century	The farmhouse is in red brick, with an eaves band, and a pantile roof with coped gables. There are two storeys, three bays, and a rear wing on the left. On the front is a central doorway, and the windows are sashes.	II
Lings Windmill; 53.56713°N 1.00545°W		Early 19th century	The former tower windmill is in red brick, and consists of a truncated cone with four storeys. It contains a segmental-arched doorway, and windows in various floors.	II
Gates, St Lawrence's Church; 53.57844°N 0.99966°W	—	Early 19th century	The gates at the southeast entrfance to the churchyard are in cast iron. They consist of double gates with gate piers and single pedestrian gates to the left. The piers have octagonal bases, and ribbed shafts and caps.	II
Tower Mill; 53.57127°N 0.98848°W	—	Early 19th century or earlier	A former tower windmill, it is in red brick on a limestone base, and consists of a five-storey truncated cone. In the lowest storey are double doors below a segmental brick arch, and each of the upper storeys contains a casement window under a segmental brick arch. At the top is an embattled parapet.	II
Wyndthorpe Hall; 53.55939°N 1.03670°W	—	c. 1826	A small country house later used for other purposes, it is stuccoed, with a plinth, a floor band, a string course beneath an eaves cornice with a blocking course, and a hipped Welsh slate roof. There are two storeys, an entrance front of seven bays, and a garden front on the right return of five bays. The central bay of the entrance front is recessed under a pediment, and contains two Ionic columns, double doors in an architrave, and a cornice. The windows are sashes. The middle three bays of the garden front project under a pediment with a moulded triangle in the tympanum, and in the front are French windows.	II
Methodist church 53.57787°N 0.99819°W	—	1835	The church is in red brick on a plinth, with an eaves band and a hipped Welsh slate roof. There is a single storey, one bay, and a later addition to the right. The windows are round-headed sashes in round arches, and at the rear is a pilaster between the windows.	II
Milepost near Gatewood End Farm; 53.53690°N 0.97772°W		Mid 19th century	The milepost is on the east side of Bawtry Road (A614 road). It is in cast iron, and consists of a triangular column with a shallow pyramidal cap. On the sides is raised lettering indicating the distances to Bawtry and Thorne.	II
The Leylands; 53.57405°N 1.00180°W	—	Mid 19th century	A rendered house on a plinth, with deep boxed eaves, lions' heads on the guttering, and a hipped Welsh slate roof with an apex lantern. There are two storeys, three bays on the front, three on the sides, four at the rear, and single-storey projections on the sides. Steps lead up to a central porch with pilasters, an archivolt with a lion's-head keystone, and a cornice with a blocking course, and the inner doorway has a fanlight. The windows are sashes with cornices on consoles. In the side projections are French windows with side lights, fanlights, and cornices.	II
Milepost near Manor House; 53.57670°N 1.00108°W		Late 19th century	The milepost is on the east side of Manor Road (A18 road). It consists of a stone pillar with a round-headed flat cast iron plaque divided into three sections. In the top section is inscribed "DONCASTER & THORNE ROAD" and "HATFIELD", and in the lower sections are the distances to Doncaster and Thorne.	II
Milepost near Wyndthorpe Hall; 53.55983°N 1.03761°W		Late 19th century	The milepost is on the southeast side of High Street (A18 road). It consists of a stone pillar with cast iron overlay, and has a triangular section and a rounded top. On the top is inscribed "DONCASTER & THORNE ROAD" and "HATFIELD", and in the lower faces are the distances to Doncaster, Hatfield, and Thorne.	II
Mortuary Chapel, Hatfield Cemetery; 53.57354°N 0.98606°W		1884	The chapel was designed by Edwin Dolby in Gothic Revival style, and is in sandstone with limestone dressings and a Westmorland slate roof. It consists of a single cell with gabled entrances, and an apse at the east end. On the roof is an octagonal flèche and a weathervane.	II
Watch Office (control tower), RAF Lindholme; 53.54707°N 0.96730°W		1939	The control tower is in rendered reinforced concrete, with bands and a coped parapet. At the rear is a projecting stair turret. There are two storeys and a flat roof, and the upper storey is recessed, forming a balcony. On the roof is the visual control room, which is octagonal, it is in the form of an inverted cone, and has corner mullions and a large window on each face. The windows elsewhere are casements in steel frames.	II
