= Campsmount Academy =

Coordinates: 53°37′30.1″N 1°11′12.6″W

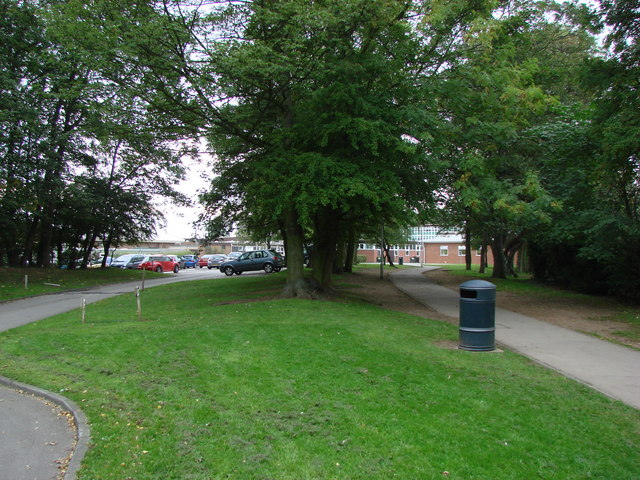
- Campsmount School (2006)

Location
- Ryecroft Road; Norton; South Yorkshire, DN6 9AS; England

Information
- Type: Academy
- Local authority: Doncaster
- Trust: Leger Educational Trust
- Department for Education URN: 138116 Tables
- Ofsted: Reports
- Headteacher: Jordanna Proctor
- Gender: Coeducational
- Age: 11 to 18
- Website: http://www.campsmount.com/

Campsmount Academy is a coeducational secondary school and sixth form located in Norton, South Yorkshire, England.

Originally known as Campsmount School, the school gained specialist status as a Technology College and was renamed Campsmount Technology College. The school was gutted by a major fire in December 2009, and temporary classrooms were erected on the site. A rebuild of the school was completed in April 2012, and a month later the school converted to academy status and was renamed Campsmount Academy.

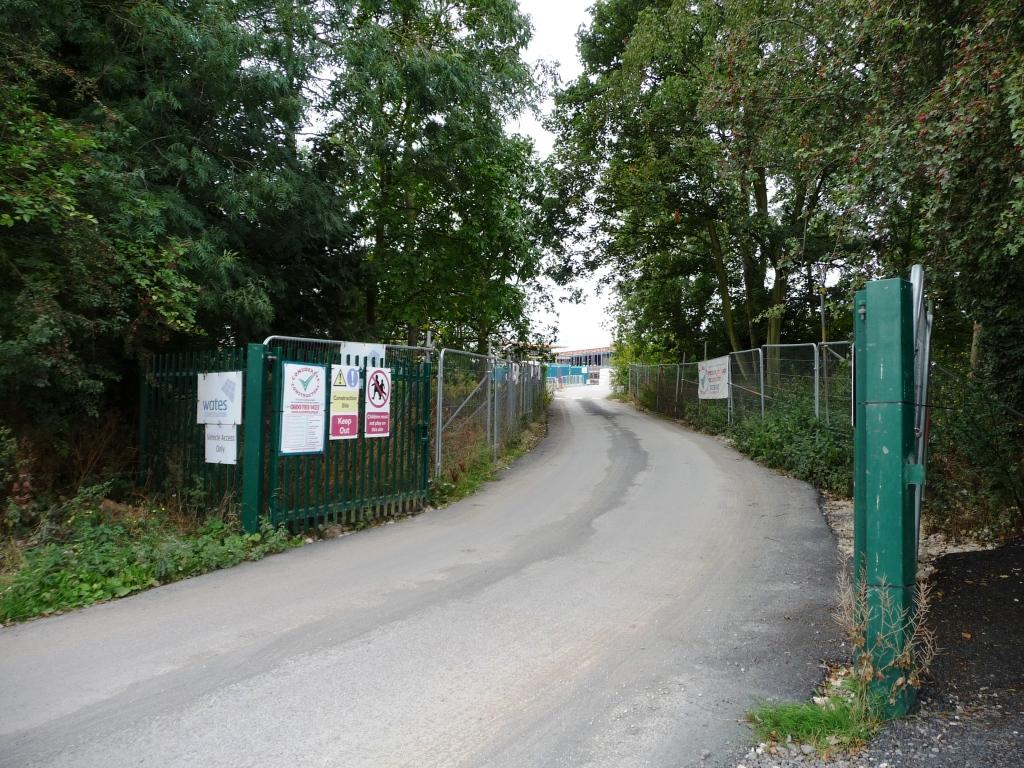
Construction site of the new school (2011)

Campsmount Academy offers GCSEs and Cambridge Nationals as programmes of study for pupils, while students in the sixth form have the option to study a range of A-levels, BTECs and Cambridge Technicals.
