= Issue of Edward III of England =

Descendants of English monarch

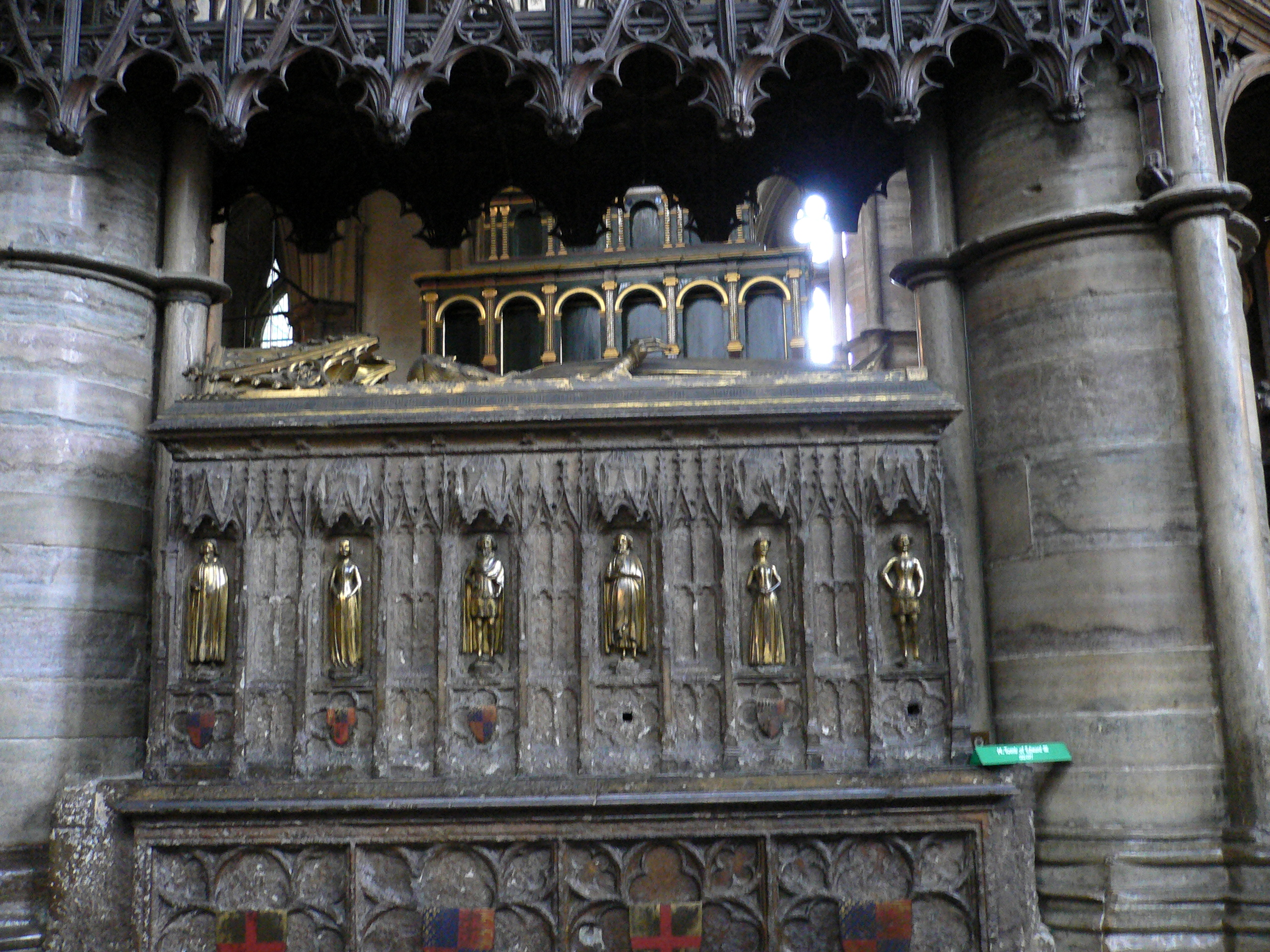
Six of the children of King Edward III depicted as bronze statuettes on the south side of the base of his tomb in Westminster Abbey: Edward the Black Prince; Edmund of Langley; William of Hatfield; Lionel of Antwerp; Mary of Brittany; Joan of the Tower. Similar statuettes of six further children appeared on the north side, now lost

1840 drawings of the six surviving bronze statuettes on the south side of the base of the tomb of King Edward III in Westminster Abbey, representing some of his progeny

King Edward III of England and his wife, Philippa of Hainault, had eight sons and five daughters. The Wars of the Roses were fought between the different factions of Edward III's descendants. The following list outlines the genealogy supporting male heirs ascendant to the throne during the conflict, and the roles of their cousins. However to mobilise arms and wealth, significant major protagonists were Richard Neville, 16th Earl of Warwick ("The Kingmaker"), Edmund Beaufort, 4th Duke of Somerset, and Henry Percy, 3rd Earl of Northumberland, and their families. A less powerful but determining role was played by Humphrey Stafford, 1st Duke of Buckingham, and Elizabeth Woodville and their families.

Adam Rutherford, a twentieth-century geneticist, has claimed that it is "virtually impossible" that a person with a predominantly British ancestry is not descended from Edward III. According to his calculations, "almost every Briton" is "descended between 21 and 24 generations from Edward III".

== Sons ==
English royal families in the Wars of the Roses

Dukes (except Aquitaine) and Princes of Wales are noted, as are the monarchs' reigns.
†=Killed in action; =Executed
See also Family tree of English monarchs

Henry of Grosmont; Duke of Lancaster	Edward III; King of England r. 1327–1377
Edward of Woodstock "The Black Prince"; Prince of Wales	Thomas of Woodstock; Duke of Gloucester	Blanche of Lancaster	John of Gaunt; Duke of Lancaster	Katherine Swynford	Edmund of Langley; Duke of York	Lionel of Antwerp; Duke of Clarence
Edward of Angoulême	Richard II; Prince of Wales, King of England r. 1377–1399	Henry IV; Duke of Lancaster, King of England r. 1399–1413	John Beaufort	Thomas Beaufort; Duke of Exeter	Joan Beaufort	Ralph Neville	Philippa of Clarence
Owen Tudor; Lancastrian	Catherine of Valois	Henry V Duke of Lancaster, Prince of Wales, King of England r. 1413–1422	Humphrey; Duke of Gloucester	Henry Percy "Hotspur"	Elizabeth Mortimer	Roger Mortimer
Edward of Norwich; Duke of York	Richard of Conisburgh	Anne de Mortimer
John Beaufort; Duke of Somerset; Lancastrian	Margaret of Anjou; Lancastrian	Henry VI; King of England r. 1422–1461, r. 1470–1471; Lancastrian	Edmund Beaufort; Duke of Somerset; Lancastrian †1st St Albans	William Neville; Yorkist	Anne Neville	Henry Percy; Lancastrian †1st St Albans	Eleanor Neville	Richard Neville; Yorkist; (executed) Wakefield	Cecily Neville	Richard of York; Duke of York, Prince of Wales; Yorkist †Wakefield
Henry Beaufort; Duke of Somerset; Lancastrian; (executed) Hexham	Richard Woodville; (executed) Edgecote	Edmund Beaufort; Duke of Somerset; Lancastrian; (executed) Tewkesbury	Margaret Beaufort	Humphrey Stafford	Henry Percy; Lancastrian †Towton	John Neville; Yorkist, then Lancastrian †Barnet	Richard Neville "Kingmaker"; Yorkist, then Lancastrian †Barnet
Margaret Beaufort; Lancastrian	Edmund Tudor; Lancastrian	Jasper Tudor; Duke of Bedford; Lancastrian	Catherine Woodville	Henry Stafford; Duke of Buckingham; Yorkist, then Lancastrian (executed)	Elizabeth Woodville	Edward IV; Duke of York, King of England r. 1461–1470, r. 1471–1483; Yorkist	George Plantagenet; Duke of Clarence; Yorkist, then Lancastrian; (executed) Tower	Edward of Westminster; Prince of Wales; Lancastrian †Tewkesbury	Anne Neville	Richard III; Duke of Gloucester, King of England r. 1483–1485; Yorkist †Bosworth Field
Henry VII; King of England; Lancastrian r. 1485–1509	Elizabeth of York	Edward V Prince of Wales, King of England r. 1483; Yorkist; (executed) Tower	Richard of Shrewsbury; Duke of York; (executed) Tower

The Wars of the Roses were civil wars over the throne of the Kingdom of England fought among the descendants of King Edward III through his five surviving adult sons. Each branch of the family had competing claims through seniority, legitimacy, and/or the sex of their ancestors, despite patriarchal rule of the day. Thus, the senior Plantagenet line was ended with the death of Richard II, but not before the execution of Thomas of Woodstock for treason. The heirs presumptive through Lionel of Antwerp were passed over in favour of the powerful Henry IV, descendant of Edward III through John of Gaunt. These Lancaster kings initially survived the treason of their Edmund of Langley (York) cousins but eventually were deposed by the merged Lionel/Edmund line in the person of Edward IV. Internecine killing among the Yorks left Richard III as king, supported and then betrayed by his cousin Buckingham, the descendant of Thomas of Woodstock. Finally, the Yorks were dislodged by the remaining Lancastrian candidate, Henry VII of the House of Tudor, another descendant of John of Gaunt, who married the eldest daughter of Yorkist King Edward IV.

=== Edward, the Black Prince (1330–1376) ===
Edward, the Black Prince (15 June 1330 – 8 June 1376), Duke of Cornwall, Prince of Wales. Although he was eldest son of Edward III, he predeceased his father thus never became king. Edward's only surviving child was Richard II who ascended to the throne but produced no heirs. Richard II designated as his heir presumptive his cousin Roger Mortimer, 4th Earl of March, senior heir of Lionel of Antwerp through Philippa of Clarence, but this succession never took place as Richard II was eventually deposed and succeeded by another of Richard's cousins, Henry Bolingbroke (who ascended as Henry IV), senior heir of John of Gaunt. Roger Mortimer had therefore a more senior right to the crown than Henry, but Edward III had reverted this ranking in 1376 by omitting Philippa from the order of succession.

=== William of Hatfield (1336–1337) ===
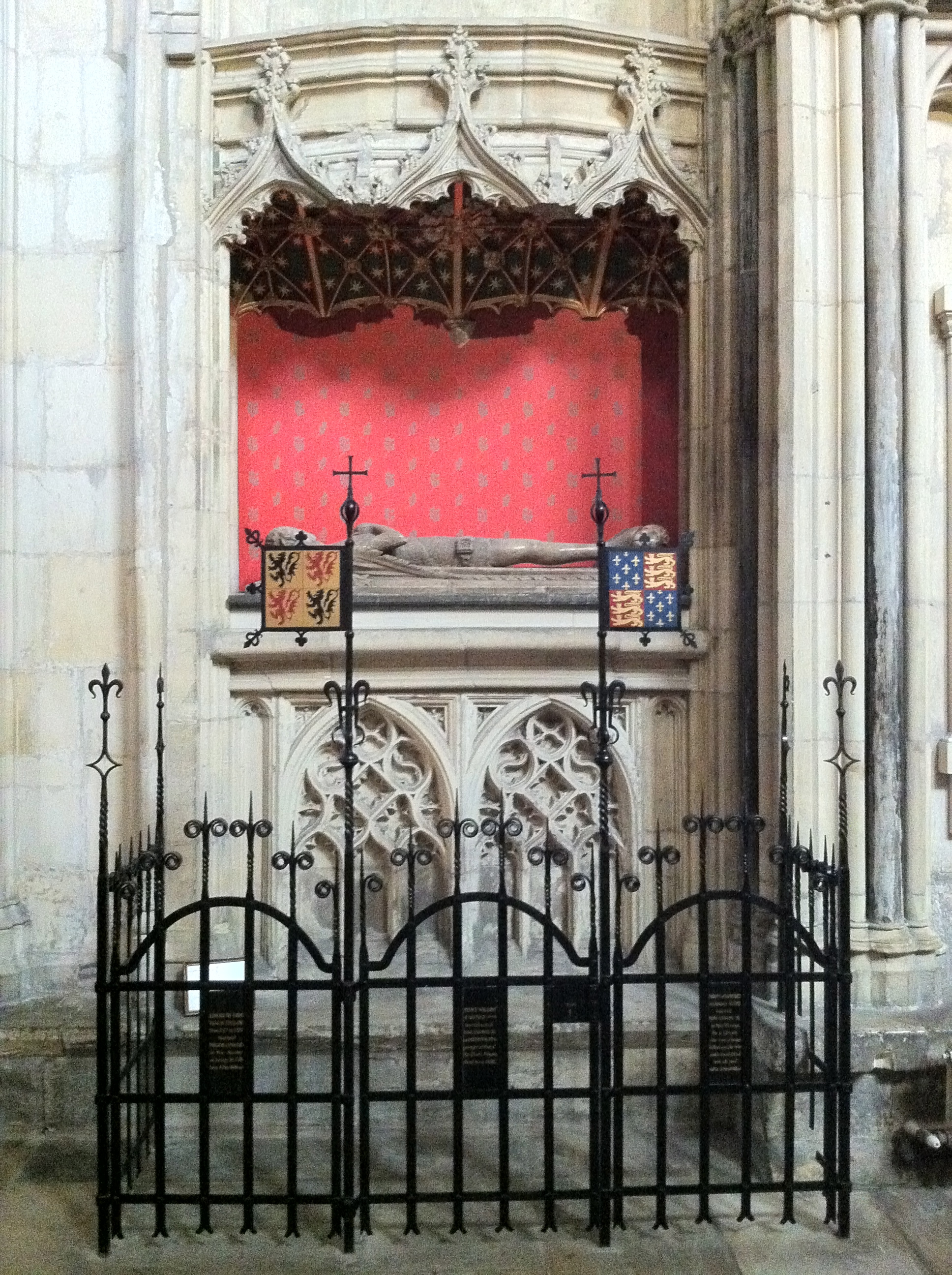
Monument to William of Hatfield in York Minster, with effigy

William of Hatfield (1336–1337), second son, was born at Hatfield Manor House in Hatfield near Doncaster in the West Riding of Yorkshire late in 1336, where Edward III kept Christmas with Queen Philippa. He was baptised by William Melton, Archbishop of York, but died soon afterwards. He was buried at York Minster on 10 February 1337, where survives his monument with effigy in the north quire aisle, the position of his burial being unknown.

=== Lionel of Antwerp, Duke of Clarence (1338–1368) ===
Lionel of Antwerp, 1st Duke of Clarence (29 November 1338 – 7 October 1368), third son. He also predeceased his father. Lionel's only child, Philippa, was acquired as a wife by the powerful Mortimer family, which as noted above had exerted enormous influence during the reigns of Edward II and Edward III. Philippa's son Roger Mortimer, 4th Earl of March, was the designated heir of King Richard II but predeceased him, leaving his young son Edmund as heir presumptive. Anne Mortimer, Edmund Mortimer's eldest sister and Lionel of Antwerp's great-granddaughter, married Richard, Earl of Cambridge, of the House of York, merging the Lionel of Antwerp/Mortimer line into the York line.

=== John of Gaunt, 1st Duke of Lancaster (1340–1399) ===
John of Gaunt (6 March 1340 – 3 February 1399), 1st Duke of Lancaster, fourth son.

==== Legitimate male heirs (Lancaster) ====
From the marriage of John of Gaunt and Blanche of Lancaster, daughter and heiress of the Duke of Lancaster, descended legitimate male heirs, the Lancasters (King Henry IV (1399–1413), who as Henry of Bolingbroke in 1399 deposed his first cousin King Richard II (1377–1399), and was followed by his son King Henry V (1413–1422) and the latter's son King Henry VI (1422–1471). This line ended in 1471 when King Henry VI's son Edward of Westminster, Prince of Wales, was killed at the Battle of Tewkesbury and when he himself was deposed by his third cousin Edward, 4th Duke of York, of the York faction (great-grandson of Edmund of Langley, 1st Duke of York, 5th son of King Edward III), who reigned as King Edward IV.

The Lancaster kings also had Plantagenet ancestry on the female side from Blanche of Lancaster, wife of John Gaunt, daughter of Henry of Grosmont, 1st Duke of Lancaster (c. 1310–1361), descended from Edmund Crouchback, 1st Earl of Lancaster, the second son of King Henry III (1216–1272), the great-grandfather of King Edward III. A legend was developed, although without foundation, claiming that Edmund Crouchback was older than his brother King Edward I and had been passed over in the succession because of physical infirmity.

==== Legitimized male heirs (Beaufort) ====
John of Gaunt's legitimized heirs were the Beaufort family, his descendants by his mistress, and later his wife, Katherine Swynford. Gaunt's great-granddaughter from this union, Margaret Beaufort (1443–1509), was the senior legitimate descendant of the Beauforts and married into the House of Tudor, producing a single child Henry Tudor, Earl of Richmond, who in 1485 at the Battle of Bosworth seized the throne from his mother's second cousin King Richard III (1483–1485) and ruled as King Henry VII (1485–1509). While the Beaufort offspring had been legitimized by Richard II by a papal bull and a royal proclamtion in Parliament, after Gaunt's eventual marriage to Katherine Swynford, this was later, by letters patent issued by Henry IV, conditioned that they be barred from ascending the throne. Undeterred by this, and following the 1461 seizure of the throne by the Yorkist King Edward IV (1461–1483) from the Lancastrian King Henry VI (1422–1461), the Tudors claimed precedence to the Yorks the last of whom, King Richard III was killed at the Battle of Bosworth in 1485.

The present Somerset family, Dukes of Beaufort, of Badminton House in Gloucestershire, are illegitimate direct male descendants of John of Gaunt, being illegitimate descendants of Henry Beaufort, 3rd Duke of Somerset, first cousin of Margaret Beaufort (1443–1509). They assumed "Somerset" as their family surname, but bear as arms the ancient arms of the Beaufort family: The royal arms of King Edward III within a bordure compony argent and azure, and in 1682 were created Dukes of Beaufort.

=== Edmund of Langley, 1st Duke of York (1341–1402) ===
Edmund of Langley, 1st Duke of York (5 June 1341 – 1 August 1402), fifth son. His descendants were the Yorks. He had two sons: Edward of Norwich, 2nd Duke of York, killed fighting alongside Henry V at the Battle of Agincourt, and Richard of Conisburgh, 3rd Earl of Cambridge, executed by Henry V for treason (involving a plot to place heir presumptive Edmund Mortimer, 5th Earl of March, Cambridge's brother-in-law and cousin, on the throne). As noted above, Richard had married Anne de Mortimer, this giving their son (and the House of York), through Lionel of Antwerp, a more senior claim than that of both the House of Lancaster, which descended from a younger son than Lionel, and the House of Tudor, whose legitimized Beaufort ancestors had been debarred from the throne. In 1460 Richard, 3rd Duke of York, claimed the throne on this basis, but an Act of Accord meant he instead became heir. However he was killed later that year, causing his son Edward to take over.

=== William of Windsor (1348–1348) ===
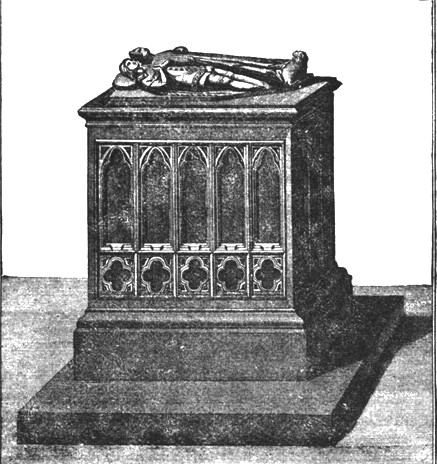
Monument and effigies of William of Windsor and of his sister Blanche, who both died as infants; Westminster Abbey

William of Windsor (24 June 1348 – 5 September 1348), seventh son. Died from the plague as an infant.

=== Thomas of Woodstock, Duke of Gloucester (1355–1397) ===
Thomas of Woodstock, 1st Duke of Gloucester (7 January 1355 – 8/9 September 1397), eighth son. He was one of the Lords Appellant influential under Richard II, was murdered or executed for treason, likely by the order of Richard II; his eventual heir was his daughter Anne, who married into the Stafford family, whose heirs became the Dukes of Buckingham. Henry Stafford, 2nd Duke of Buckingham, descended on his father's side from Thomas of Woodstock, and on his mother's side from John Beaufort.

== Arms of the sons of Edward III ==
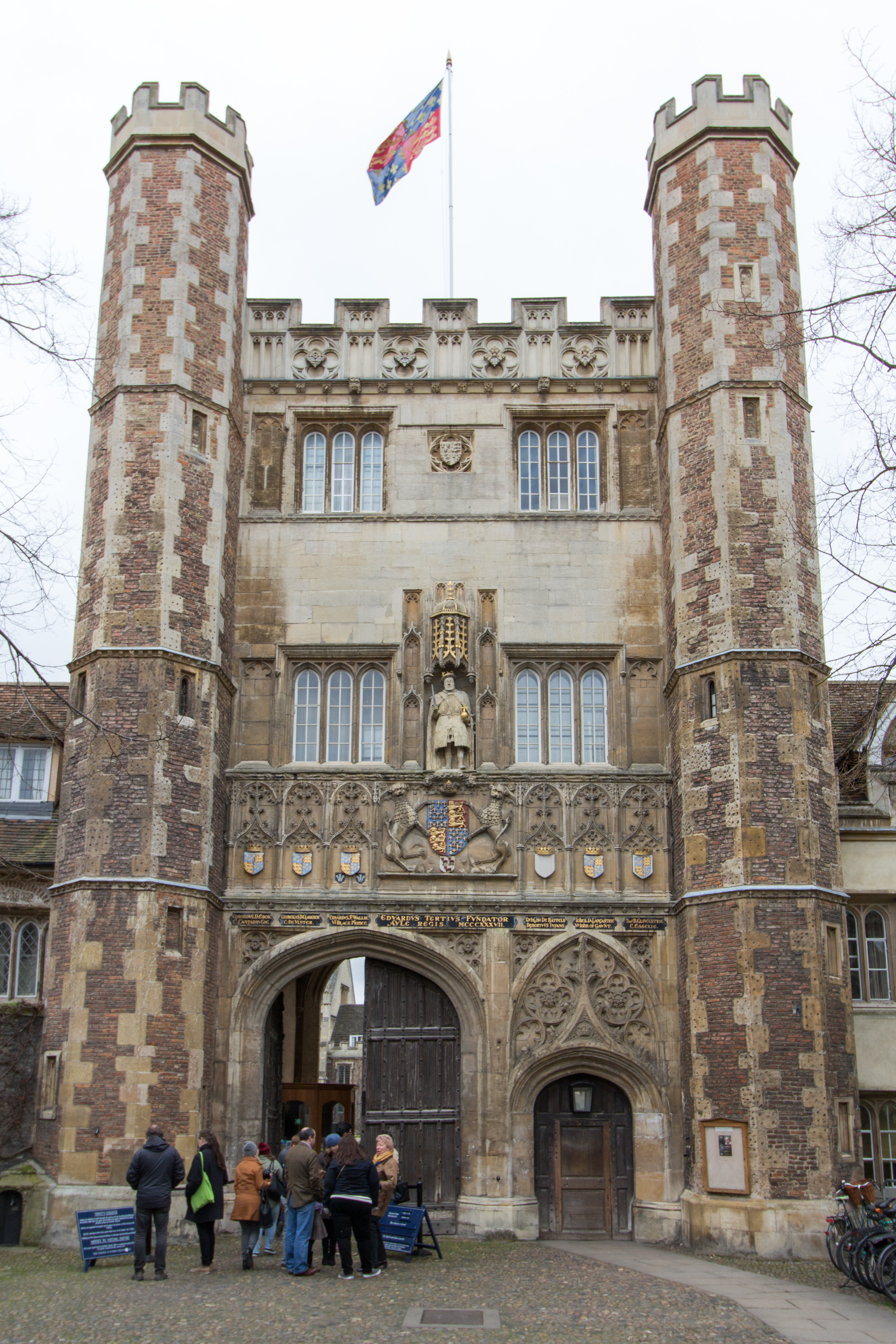
Edward's sons' arms appear over the Great Gate of Trinity College, Cambridge: York, Clarence, Wales, Hatfield, Lancaster, and Gloucester.

Arms of the sons of Edward III
Arms of Edward the Black Prince: Royal arms of Edward III, a label of three points argent for difference

Peace Shield of the Black Prince: sable, three feathers argent
Now the Prince of Wales's feathers

Arms of Lionel of Antwerp, Duke of Clarence: Royal arms of Edward III, a label of three points argent each point bearing a canton gules (or: a label of five points argent each point bearing a Cross of St George)

Arms of John of Gaunt: Royal arms of Edward III, a label of three points argent on each point three spots ermine

Arms of Henry IV (1399–1413), eldest legitimate son of John of Gaunt: Royal arms of England

Arms of Beaufort, legitimized sons of John of Gaunt by Katherine Swynford: Royal arms of Edward III, a bordure compony argent and azure for difference

Arms of Edmund of Langley, 1st Duke of York: Royal arms of Edward III, a label of three points argent on each point three torteaux for difference

Arms of Thomas of Woodstock: Royal arms of Edward III, a bordure argent for difference

== Daughters ==
- Isabella, Countess of Bedford (16 June 1332 – c. 5 October 1382), married Enguerrand VII de Coucy, 1st Earl of Bedford. Had issue.
- Joan of England (February 1334 – 2 September 1348) died of the plague in Bordeaux, on her way to marry Peter of Castile. No issue.
- Blanche (1342), died young.
- Mary of Waltham (10 October 1344 – September 1362), married John IV, Duke of Brittany. No issue.
- Margaret, Countess of Pembroke (20 July 1346 – October/December 1361), married John Hastings, 2nd Earl of Pembroke. No issue.
