= St Lawrence's Church, Hatfield =

Church in Hatfield, South Yorkshire, England

Coordinates: 53°34′43″N 1°00′00″W

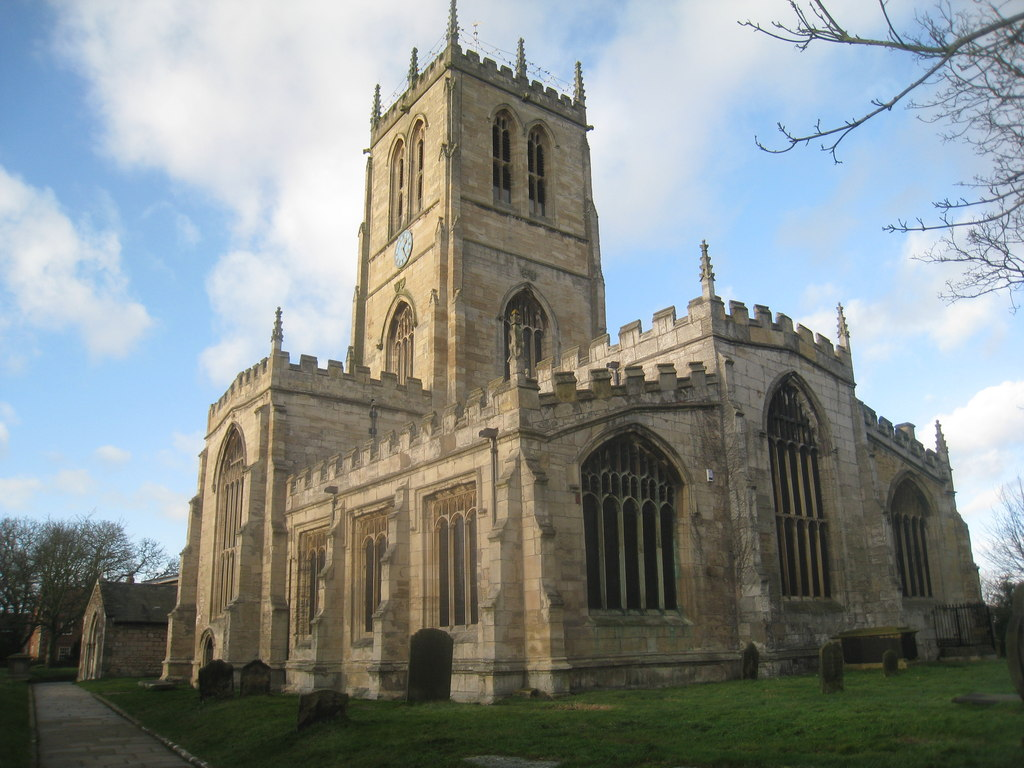
The church, from the south east, in 2012

St Lawrence's Church is the parish church of Hatfield, South Yorkshire, which lies north-east of Doncaster in England.

The oldest parts of the church date from about 1150, with the arcades added in the 13th century, and the tower, transepts and east end added about 1400. The church suffered a fire in the 1760s. It was altered by Thomas Jackson in 1872, and restored by Edwin Dolby in 1882. It was Grade I listed in 1966.

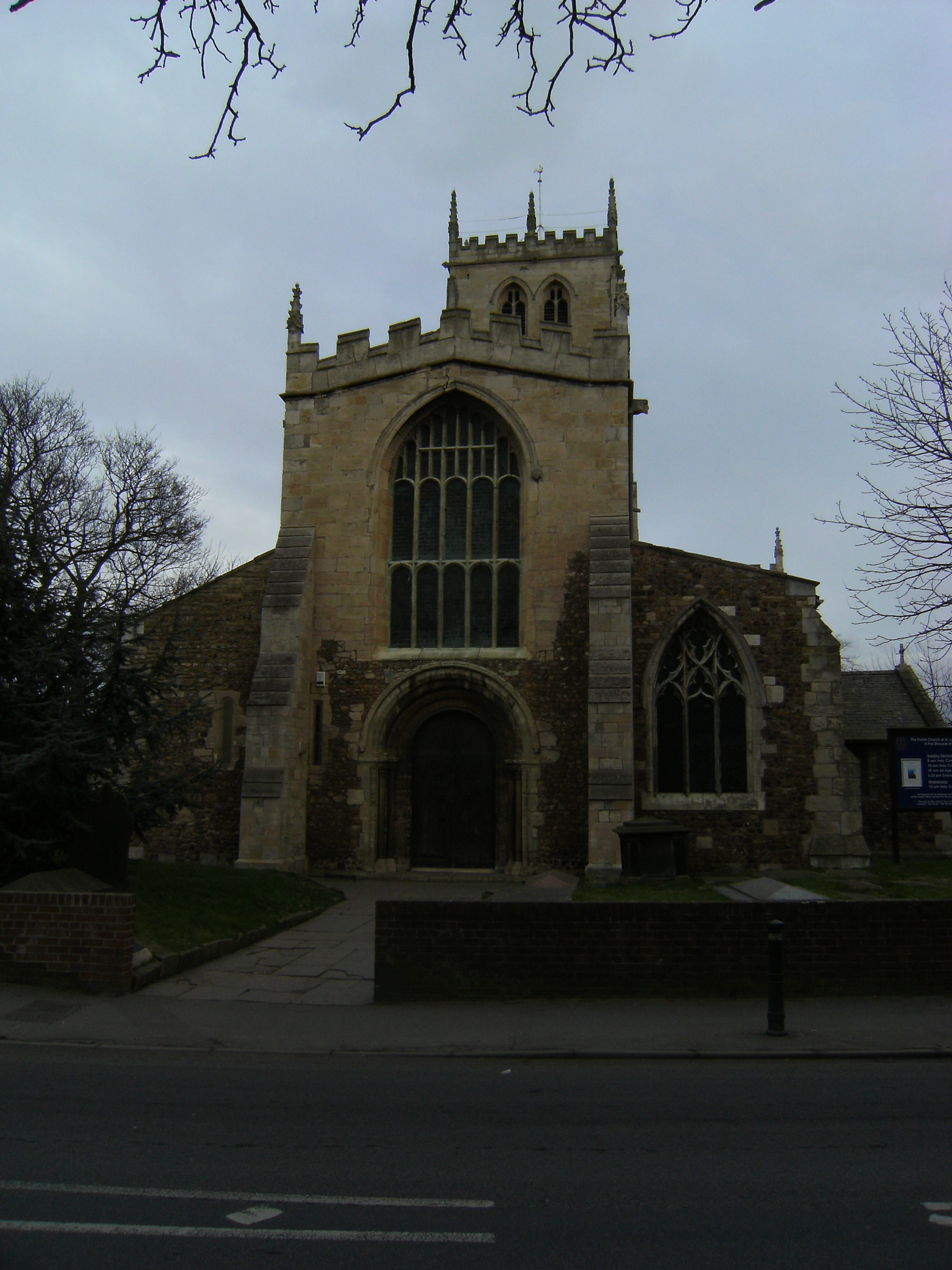
The church from the west, in 2008

The oldest parts of the church are built of pebble, but most is of limestone from Roche Abbey. The church is cruciform in plan, with a five bay nave, three bay chancel, and a tower over the crossing. There is a porch to the south, and the chancel has both north and south chapels. The inner porch doorway is round-headed and dates from the 12th century, and the oak door is early. Most of the windows are Perpendicular, although there are three early lancets in the west end. There is a 15th-century clerestory. The tower displays the arms of the Savage family.

Inside, the roofs are mostly 15th century, as is the intricate wooden chancel screen. The font has a base dating from about 1300, while the upper part is 19th century. There is a tablet dated 1695 which lists benefactions. The stained glass is mostly 19th century and designed by Charles Eamer Kempe, with a Millennium window added to the north transept in 2000. There is a dug-out chest made of bog oak, which is thought to date from the 12th century, and originally had ten locks. A suit of 16th century armour was formerly on display, but is now on long-term loan to the Royal Armouries Museum.

== See also ==
- Grade I listed buildings in South Yorkshire
- Listed buildings in Hatfield, South Yorkshire
