= Listed buildings in Barnburgh =

Barnburgh is a civil parish in the metropolitan borough of Doncaster, South Yorkshire, England. The parish contains 16 listed buildings that are recorded in the National Heritage List for England. Of these, one is listed at Grade I, the highest of the three grades, one is at Grade II*, the middle grade, and the others are at Grade II, the lowest grade. The parish contains the villages of Barnburgh and Harlington, and the surrounding area. Most of the listed buildings are houses, cottages and associated structures, farmhouses and farm buildings. The other listed buildings are a church, a stone coffin in the churchyard, a village pump, and a public house.

== Key ==
Grade	Criteria
I	Buildings of exceptional interest, sometimes considered to be internationally important
II*	Particularly important buildings of more than special interest
II	Buildings of national importance and special interest

== Buildings ==
Name and location	Photograph	Date	Notes	Grade
St Peter's Church; 53.52337°N 1.27120°W		11th to 12th century	The oldest part of the church is the lower stage of the tower, the north arcade dates from about 1200, most of the rest of the church from the 14th and 15th centuries, and it was restored in 1848–49. The church is built in limestone with lead roofs, and consists of a nave with a clerestory, north and south aisles, a south porch, a chancel with a north chapel, and a west tower. The tower has three stages, angle buttresses in the lower part, a recessed two-light west window, a small round-headed window on the south side, a clock face on the east side, a string course with gargoyles, and an embattled parapet with pinnacled corner turrets. On the top is a recessed spirelet with crockets and a weathervane. The parapets on the body of the church are embattled with crocketed pinnacles, and the east window has five lights.	I
Stone coffin 53.52332°N 1.27114°W		Medieval	The coffin is in the churchyard of St Peter's Church, and is against the south wall of the chancel. It is in limestone and consists of a tapered block about 2 metres (6 ft 7 in) long and 0.4 metres (1 ft 4 in) wide, hollowed out for the head and body.	II
Dovecote, Barnburgh Hall; 53.52444°N 1.26724°W		Late 16th to early 17th century (probable)	The dovecote in the grounds of the demolished hall is in limestone, with quoins, a chamfered plinth band, a continuous first-floor hood mould, a chamfered band under the eaves, and a hipped stone slate roof surmounted by an octagonal lantern with a hipped roof. The doorway has chamfered jambs and a Tudor arched lintel with voussoirs, and the windows are mullioned.	II*
Bank End Farmhouse; 53.51713°N 1.27596°W	—	17th century	The farmhouse is in sandstone, and has a pantile roof with gable copings and kneelers. There are two storeys and three bays. The doorway is in the centre, and the windows, previously mullioned, are casements.	II
Outhouse, Barnburgh Hall; 53.52510°N 1.26719°W		17th century (probable)	The outbuilding to the demolished hall is in limestone, with quoins, and a stone slate roof with coped gables and shaped kneelers. It contains a segmental-arched cart entry with a quoined surround, and a smaller segmental archway to the right. Most of the windows are mullioned, and some have retained diamond-latticed casements.	II
Old Hall; 53.51736°N 1.27548°W		17th century	A farmhouse that was altered and extended in the 18th century, it is in sandstone, and has pantile roofs with coped gables and shaped kneelers. There are two storeys and an L-shaped plan. The doorways have quoined or chamfered surrounds, one with a hood mould. Most of the windows are sashes, one is horizontally-sliding, there are two three-light mullioned windows, and a small casement window.	II
Barn and cowhouse with hayloft, Plane Tree Farm; 53.52403°N 1.27104°W	—	17th century	The farm buildings are in limestone with stone slate eaves courses, a pantile roof with coped gables, and an L-shaped plan. The barn has nine bays, and contains quoins, slit vents, and opposing cart entries with quoined surrounds and segmental arches. The cowhouse to the right is rendered, and has two storeys, doorways, casement windows, and external steps to the hayloft doorway.	II
Hickleton House; 53.52525°N 1.26984°W	—	17th century	The farmhouse, which was extended in the 19th century, is in sandstone, with stone slate eaves, quoins, and a pantile roof with chamfered gable copings and shaped kneelers on the right. There are two storeys, the original range has three bays, and the addition is a cross-wing on the left. The central doorway has a chamfered quoined surround, and the windows are mullioned with 20th-century casements. Above the doorway is a hood mould that continues over the ground floor windows.	II
Outbuilding northeast of Hickleton House; 53.52528°N 1.26948°W	—	17th century	The barn and outbuilding were extended in the 18th century. The building is in sandstone, with quoins, stone slate and tile eaves, and a pantile roof with square-cut gable copings and shaped kneelers. The barn has two storeys, and contains a segmental-arched wagon entry with chamfered voussoirs, a hatch, and a casement window. The extension is lower and has a central doorway, and blocked doorways with monolithic jambs and deep lintels.	II
Outbuilding south of Hickleton House; 53.52502°N 1.26977°W	—	Mid 17th century	The outbuilding is in sandstone, with quoins, stone slate eaves courses, and a pantile roof with square-cut gable copings and shaped kneelers. There are two storeys and four bays. The original doorway has a chamfered quoined surround and a lintel with a triangular-arched soffit, and there are later doorways. In the upper floor are casement windows with double-chamfered surrounds.	II
Two barns, High Street; 53.52481°N 1.26981°W	—	17th century (probable)	The two barns are linked at right angles. They are in sandstone, with quoins, stone slate and tile eaves courses, and pantile roofs with gable copings and shaped kneelers. Both barns have two storeys and three bays, and slit vents. The barn end-on to the road has double doors, a hatch, and windows, some of which are mullioned, and others are casements. There are external steps on the right return. The other barn has two doorways with deep lintels and casement windows.	II
Green Farmhouse; 53.52339°N 1.26995°W	—	Late 17th century	The farmhouse, which has been extended, is in sandstone with quoins and a Welsh slate roof. There are three storeys and two bays, a two-storey single-bay extension to the right, and a lower two storey single-bay extension on the left. The central doorway has a chamfered quoined surround and a hood mould. The windows in the lower two floors are casements with recessed chamfered surrounds, and in the top floor is a two-light mullioned window.	II
Smithy Cottage and The Cottage; 53.52385°N 1.26884°W	—	Mid 18th century	A row of three cottages, later converted into two, in sandstone, with quoins, stone slate eaves courses, and a pantile roof with gable copings and shaped kneelers. There are two storeys, a front of three bays, a rear wing on the left, and a rear extension on the right. On the front is a doorway with a deep lintel, to the right is a circular window in a former doorway, and the other windows are casements.	II
Garden wall and gate piers, Barnburgh Hall; 53.52467°N 1.26824°W		Late 18th century (probable)	The garden wall and gate piers of the demolished hall are in limestone, and the wall encloses the polygonal site of the gardens. The north wall contains a doorway with a quoined surround and a triangular head, with a panel above carved with sea creatures in relief. There is another doorway to the east of the gateway with a quoined surround and a tripartite keystone. The piers are paired, the inner piers larger, they are rusticated with cornices, and they are linked by dwarf walls with saddleback copings.	II
Village Pump; 53.52344°N 1.27040°W		Mid 19th century	The water pump is in cast iron, and has a cylindrical base with openings at the front and rear. The shaft is in the form of a fluted Doric column, with a cranked handle to the right, and a spout projecting from the capital. The cap is fluted, and has a ball finial.	II
The Coach and Horses public house 53.52384°N 1.26981°W		1938	The public house has painted rendered walls, brick porches, dressings in stone and brick, and a tile roof. There are two storeys and cellars, two wings at right angles, and lower angled infill containing an entrance. The windows are casements, there is a canted bay window, and two dormer windows over the entrance.	II
