= St Mary Magdalene, Campsall =

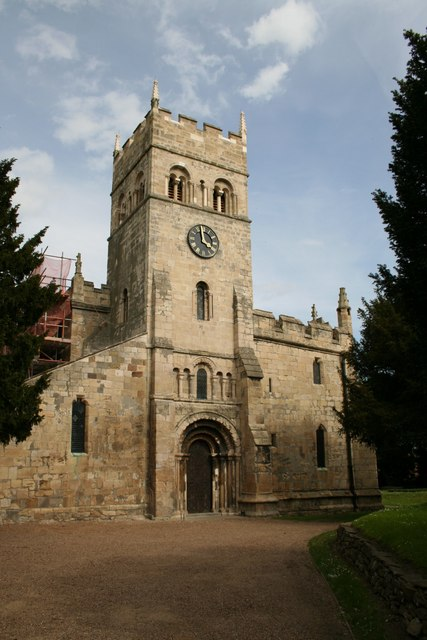
- St Mary Magdalene, Campsall
- 53.6204°N 1.1780°W
- OS grid reference: SE 54476 14076
- Denomination: Church of England
- Churchmanship: Broad Church
- Website: acny.uk/17622/

History
- Dedication: St Mary Magdalene

Architecture
- Heritage designation: Grade I
- Designated: 5 June 1968

Administration
- Province: Province of York
- Diocese: Sheffield
- Archdeaconry: Doncaster
- Deanery: Adwick Le Street
- Parish: Campsall

Clergy
- Priest: In interregnum

St Mary Magdalene is a parish church in the Church of England in Campsall in South Yorkshire. It is Grade I listed. There is a service every Sunday at 11:00.

== History ==
The present church, dedicated to St Mary Magdalene, was established towards the end of the eleventh century and contains features of almost every style of architecture since that time. Originally the Norman church was planned to be cruciform but it was changed to feature the western tower and included a chancel, transepts and a nave to which aisles were later added. The church was supported for many years by its principal benefactors, the Yarbrough family of Campsmount. Several of the monuments in the chancel are dedicated to the Yarbrough family including an 1803 memorial commemorating Thomas Yarbrough by renowned sculptor, John Flaxman. In 1879, when the Rev. Edwin Castle was vicar, eight bells (three new and five re-cast) were installed along with a new clock. The vicarage had been restored the previous year.

== Robin Hood ==
It is locally reputed that legendary outlaw Robin Hood was married to Maid Marian at this church. Based upon a Child Ballad, the theory is founded on the premise that St Mary Magdalene is the only possible church in the area to fit the description, but no firm evidence exists for this supposition. In 2013, when the National Churches Trust were compiling a list of the nation's favourite places of worship, the local MP Ed Miliband nominated St Mary Magdalene because of its association with the Robin Hood legend.

== See also ==
- Grade I listed buildings in South Yorkshire
- Listed buildings in Norton and Askern
