= Church of St John the Baptist, Royston, South Yorkshire =

Church of St John the Baptist
- Church of Saint John the Baptist, Royston
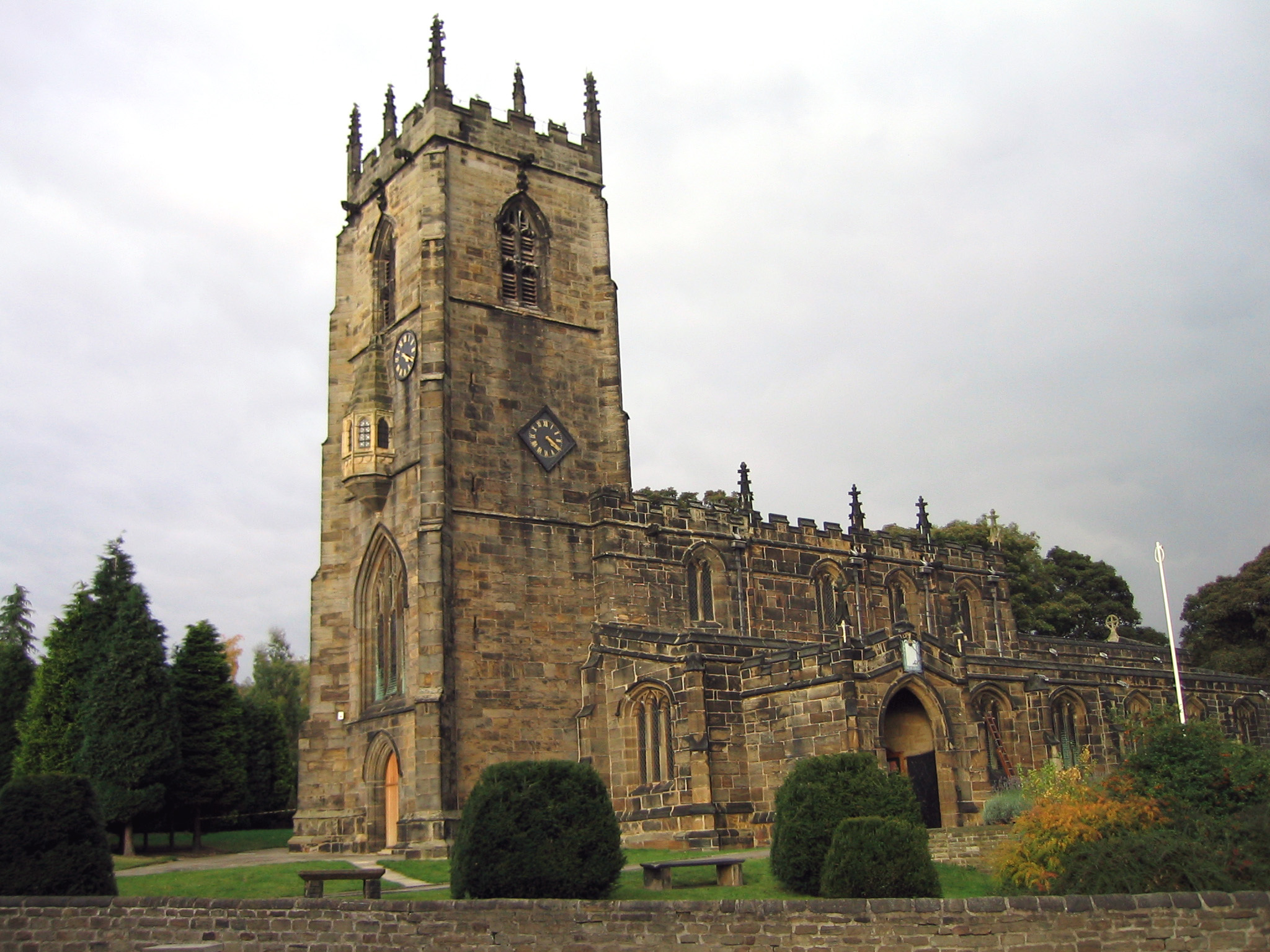
- St John the Baptist Church
- Church of St John the Baptist
- 53°35′47.4″N 1°27′4.1″W
- OS grid reference: SE 36423 11243
- Address: Church Lane, Royston, Barnsley, South Yorkshire, S71 4QZ
- Country: England
- Denomination: Church of England

History
- Status: Grade I listed building

Architecture
- Architectural type: Parish church
- Style: Norman, Decorated Gothic, and Perpendicular Gothic

Specifications
- Materials: Sandstone rubble and ashlar, lead and stone slate roofs

Administration
- Diocese: Diocese of Sheffield
- Parish: Royston

Listed Building – Grade I
- Official name: Church of St John the Baptist
- Designated: 11 November 1966
- Reference no.: 1151127

The Church of St John the Baptist is an active Church of England parish church located in Royston, South Yorkshire, England. Dating from the 12th century, with major 14th- and 15th-century rebuilds, the building was designated a Grade I listed building on 11 November 1966.

== History ==
=== Medieval origins ===
A church existed at Royston by the 12th century, functioning as the mother church for a large ancient parish that encompassed several neighbouring settlements, including Monk Bretton, Cudworth, and Carlton.

In the late 12th century, the advowson of the church was granted to the Cluniac Monk Bretton Priory, which held the rectory and appointed vicars to the parish until the Dissolution of the Monasteries under Henry VIII.

The church was substantially rebuilt in the 14th century, when the nave arcades and chancel were erected, followed by a major late 15th-century campaign that added the west tower, aisle walls, and clerestory in the Perpendicular style.

=== Post-Reformation to present ===
Following the dissolution of Monk Bretton Priory in 1538, patronage passed to the Crown and subsequently to regional landowners. The parish received several local charitable endowments in the post-Reformation period; notably, in 1662, Lady Mary Bolles of Heath Hall left a bequest in her will to support the local poor, the church, and the parish grammar school.

Between 1867 and 1869, the church underwent a major restoration directed by the Leeds architect George Fowler Jones. The work included structural repairs to the medieval nave roof, reseating of the nave, and the unblocking of the tower arch to expose the west window.

The church remains an active parish church within the Deanery of Barnsley in the Diocese of Sheffield.

== Architecture and interior ==
=== Exterior ===
The church is constructed from local sandstone ashlar and coursed rubble. The layout comprises a five-bay nave with north and south aisles, a three-bay chancel flanked by side chapels, a north porch, and a prominent three-stage west tower.

A distinctive architectural feature of the west tower is a projecting 15th-century oriel window on its western face, positioned above the main entrance doorway. Local tradition and historical accounts record that a light was kept burning in this window to serve as a lantern, guiding travellers across the low-lying, marshy lands of the Dearne Valley between Royston and neighbouring villages.

=== Interior and fittings ===
The nave arcades feature tall 14th-century octagonal piers supporting double-chamfered arches. The nave and chancel retain late medieval timber camber-beam roofs featuring heavy carved oak bosses depicting heraldic shields and floral motifs.

Notable interior features include:

- A 15th-century stone font with an octagonal bowl carved with heraldic devices.
- Parclose screens separating the chancel from the north and south chapels.
- Wall monuments from the 17th and 18th centuries dedicated to local gentry families, including members of the Nevile family of Chevet.
