= Harlington, South Yorkshire =

Village in South Yorkshire, England

Coordinates: 53.517°N 1.276°W

Harlington
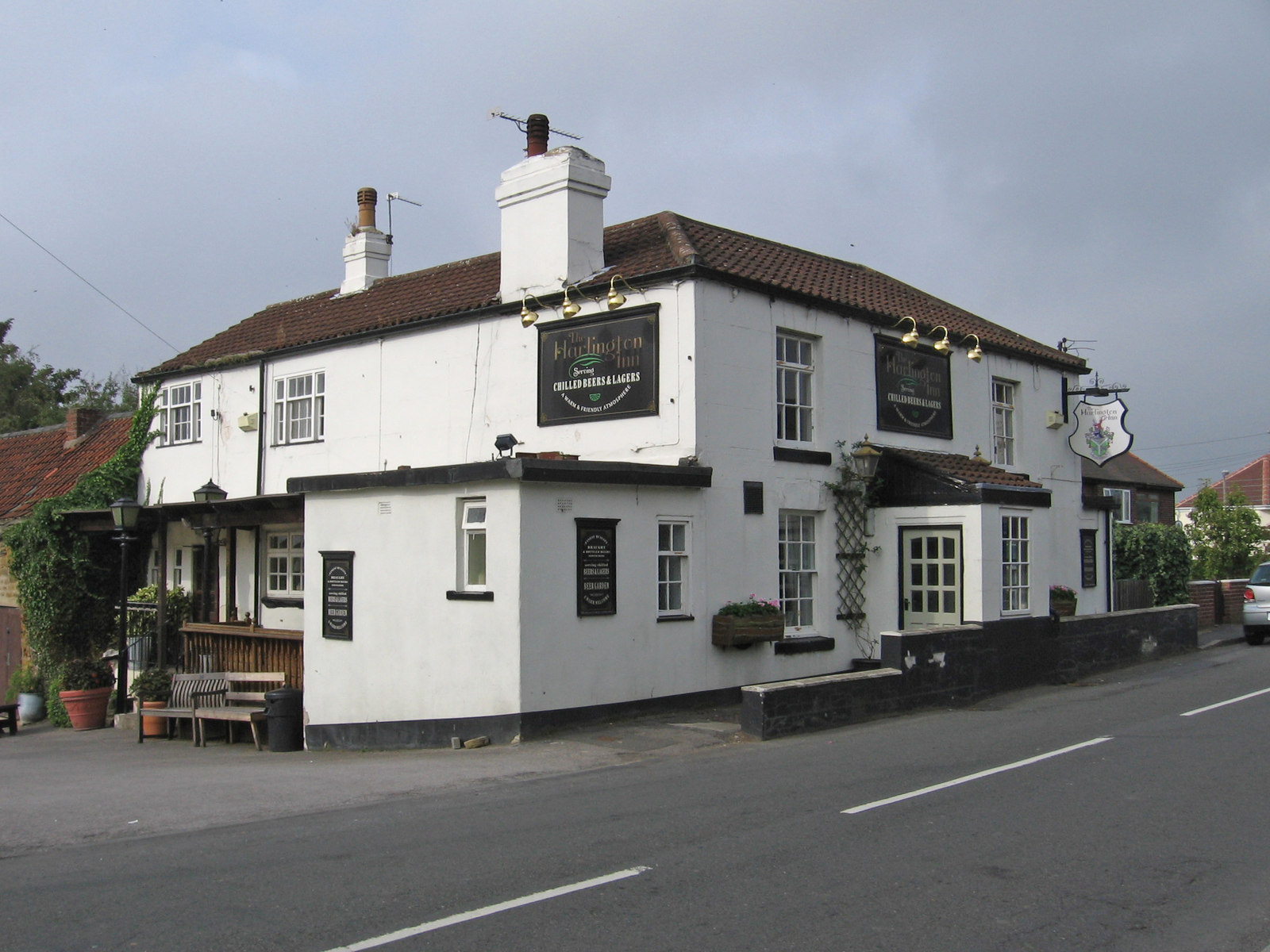
- Harlington Inn

- Location within South Yorkshire
- Population: 2,297 (2011)
- OS grid reference: SE485025
- Metropolitan borough: Doncaster
- Metropolitan county: South Yorkshire
- Region: Yorkshire and the Humber
- Country: England
- Sovereign state: United Kingdom
- Post town: DONCASTER
- Postcode district: DN5
- Dialling code: 01709
- Police: South Yorkshire
- Fire: South Yorkshire
- Ambulance: Yorkshire
- UK Parliament: Doncaster North

Harlington is a village in the civil parish of Barnburgh in the City of Doncaster in South Yorkshire, England. The village lies less than a mile from the adjoining village of Barnburgh and the parish contains both villages. According to the 2001 census, Harlington had a population of 1,979, increasing to 2,297 at the 2011 Census. The village is located about 3 miles (4.8 km) (by road) north of Mexborough, 2 miles (3.2 km) east of Goldthorpe and about 8 miles (13 km) west of Doncaster. Doncaster itself lies about 200 miles (320 km) north of London.

Rachael Wooding, a performer in the musical theatre who toured in the title role of Evita in 2009, was born in Harlington.

== See also ==
- Listed buildings in Barnburgh
