= Norton, Doncaster =

Village and civil parish in South Yorkshire, England

Coordinates: 53.633°N 1.175°W

Norton
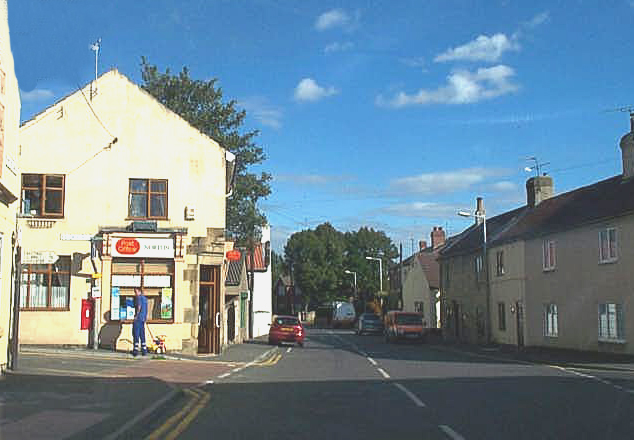
- West End Road with post office

- Location within City of Doncaster Location within South Yorkshire
- Population: 4,625 (2011)
- Civil parish: Norton
- Metropolitan borough: City of Doncaster
- Metropolitan county: South Yorkshire
- Region: Yorkshire and the Humber
- Country: England
- Sovereign state: United Kingdom
- Post town: DONCASTER
- Postcode district: DN6
- Dialling code: 01302
- Police: South Yorkshire
- Fire: South Yorkshire
- Ambulance: Yorkshire
- UK Parliament: Doncaster North

Norton is a village and civil parish in the City of Doncaster, South Yorkshire, England, on the borders with North and West Yorkshire. The civil parish also includes the villages of Campsall and Sutton; it had a population of 4,381 in the 2001 Census, increasing to 4,625 in 2011. The northern boundary of the parish is marked by the River Went, while the A1 Great North Road forms the western boundary.

== History ==
The name Norton derives from the Old English norðtūn meaning 'north settlement'.

Little is known about Norton until it was recorded in the Domesday Survey of 1086, when it probably had a population of 100 who were solely concerned with agriculture. During the medieval period that followed, Robin Hood was associated with Barnsdale Forest to the west whilst the nearby village of Campsall grew in importance, gaining a chartered market and Norman church. However, Norton gets few mentions in any surviving records from this time.

At a later date, Norton Priory was developed on the banks of the River Went but this never grew to be particularly significant and was subsequently demolished following the dissolution of the monasteries in 1588. In 1745, Mary Ramsden of Norton died and left 50 shillings to the poor of Norton and ‘several estates’ to the master and fellows of Catherine Hall, Cambridge. Thus a Cambridge College became the Lord of the manor of Norton and a handsome manor house was built in the village. In the 1800s, the Forrester's Arms and the School Boy Inn were both established to serve the local population which would still be devoted to agriculture.

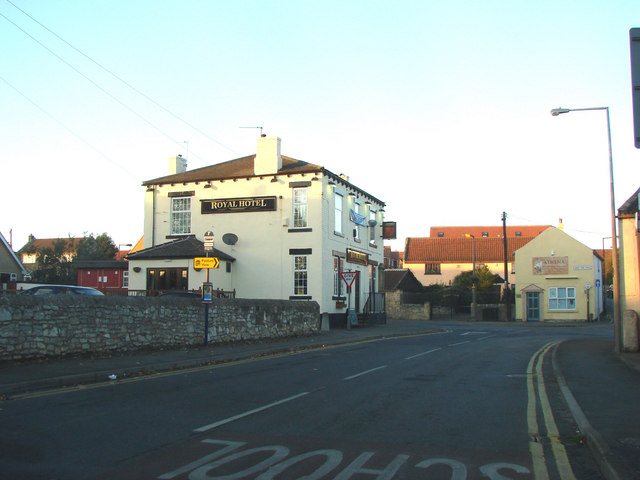
The Royal Hotel

Following the Industrial Revolution and the expansion of the railways, Norton railway station was opened in 1855 on the Lancashire and Yorkshire Railway’s Knottingley branch. The station was closed to passengers on 27 September 1948.

At the start of the 20th century, there were rumours of the development of collieries at nearby Kirk Smeaton and Askern. As Norton was located between the two, a number of rows of red brick terraces were erected speculatively to house the anticipated influx of miners. Subsequently, Askern Colliery was opened in 1910 and a new red brick pub, the Royal Hotel, was built in Norton to serve the colliers of the village.

Throughout the 20th century, small areas of housing have been built throughout the village; many of the original stone cottages with their long gardens have been demolished and infilled with housing. The Manor House was pulled down in the 1970s and other older buildings have suffered the same fate since then; this includes Hope Farm, which was demolished in 2002 to be replaced a small development of private housing.

== The village today ==
In the 21st century, Norton serves as a commuter village for people working in the nearby towns such as Doncaster and Pontefract. It retains one pub, a Working Men's Club and one village shop. The only structure left of historic importance is the Grade II listed village water pump.

== See also ==
- Listed buildings in Norton and Askern
