= Barnburgh =

Village and civil parish in South Yorkshire, England

Coordinates: 53.52°N 1.27°W

- Village
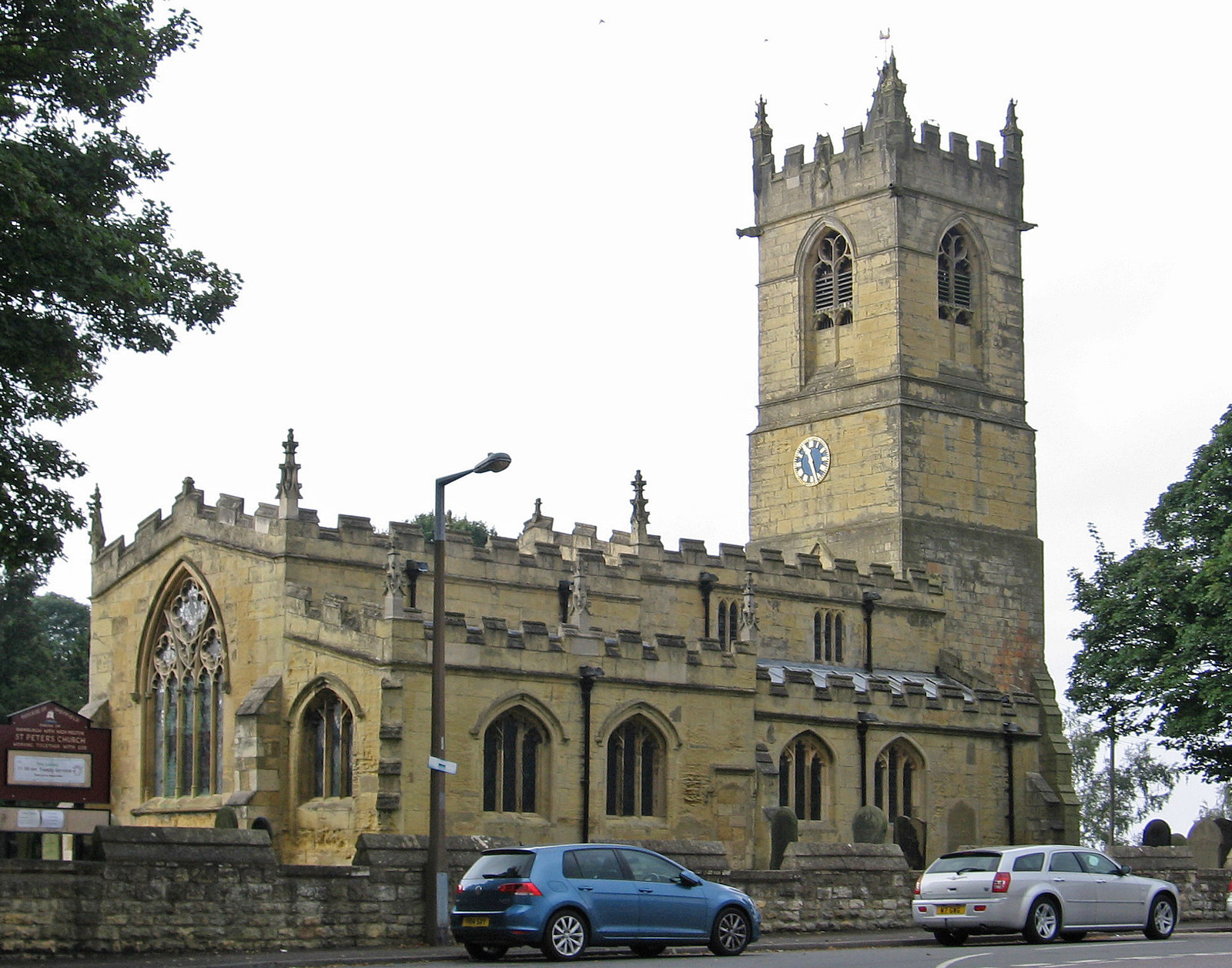
- Barnburgh - St Peter's Church

- Location within City of Doncaster Location within South Yorkshire
- Population: 1,924 (2011 census)
- Civil parish: Barnburgh
- Metropolitan borough: Doncaster
- Metropolitan county: South Yorkshire
- Region: Yorkshire and the Humber
- Country: England
- Sovereign state: United Kingdom
- Post town: DONCASTER
- Postcode district: DN5
- Dialling code: 01709
- Police: South Yorkshire
- Fire: South Yorkshire
- Ambulance: Yorkshire
- UK Parliament: Doncaster North

Barnburgh is a village and civil parish in the City of Doncaster in South Yorkshire, England. The village is adjacent to the village of Harlington - the parish contains both villages, and according to the 2001 census it had a population of 1,979, reducing to 1,924 at the 2011 Census. The village is located 3 miles (4.8 km) north of Mexborough, 2 miles (3.2 km) east of Goldthorpe and 8 miles (13 km) west of Doncaster itself.

The name Barnburgh derives from the Old Norse personal name Barni or Bjarni and the Old English burh meaning 'fortification'. The first element could be derived from barn meaning a 'child'.

In the centre of the village is the parish church of St Peter, which is famous for the legend of the 'Cat and Man' and is mainly of Norman and Transitional architectural styles.

There was a coal mine situated half a mile west of the village called Barnburgh Main Colliery, which operated between 1911 and 1989.

== See also ==
- Listed buildings in Barnburgh
