= Hatfield, South Yorkshire =

Town and civil parish in South Yorkshire, England

Coordinates: 53.58°N 1.00°W

Hatfield
- Town and civil parish
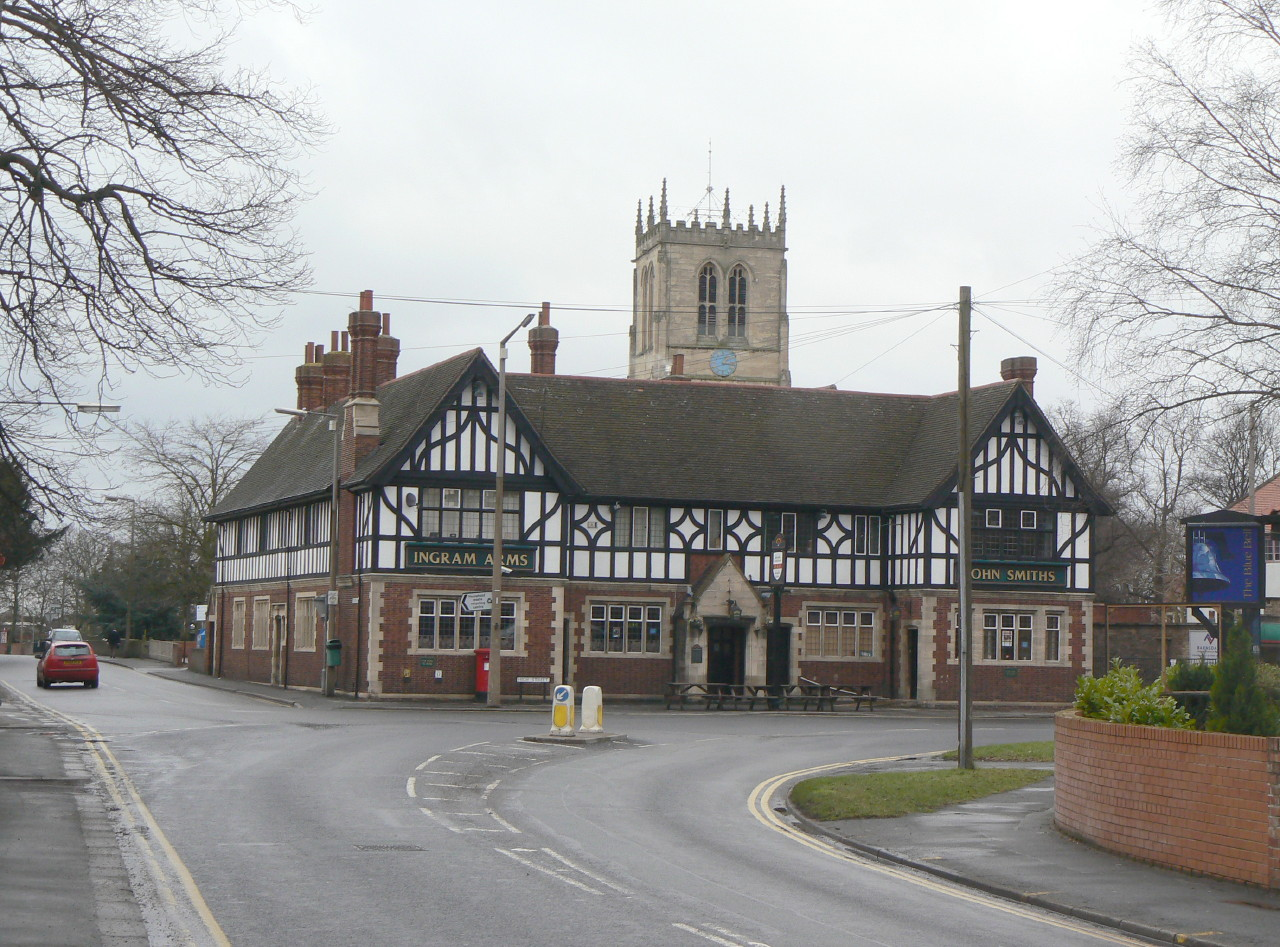
- The Ingram Arms and tower of St Lawrence's Church

- Location within the Borough of Doncaster Location within South Yorkshire
- Area: 23.96 sq mi (62.1 km^{2})
- Population: 17,236 (2011 census)
  - Density: 719/sq mi (278/km^{2})
- Civil parish: Hatfield
- Metropolitan borough: City of Doncaster
- Metropolitan county: South Yorkshire
- Region: Yorkshire and the Humber
- Country: England
- Sovereign state: United Kingdom
- Post town: DONCASTER
- Postcode district: DN7
- Dialling code: 01302
- Police: South Yorkshire
- Fire: South Yorkshire
- Ambulance: Yorkshire
- UK Parliament: Doncaster East and the Isle of Axholme

Hatfield is a town and civil parish in the City of Doncaster in South Yorkshire, England. It had a population of 17,236 at the 2011 Census. The town is located on the A18 road between Doncaster and Scunthorpe, and to the west of the M18 motorway. It shares a railway station with Stainforth on the line between Goole and Scunthorpe, and Doncaster. Recorded history in the parish extends as far back as 730, when Bede wrote about the Northumbrian King, Edwin, being killed in battle in the area.

== History ==
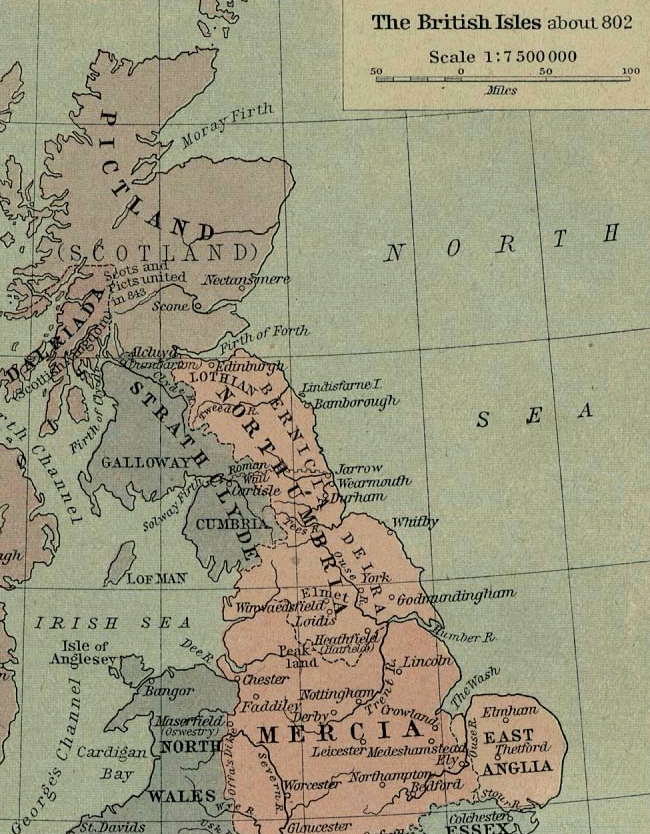
Section from Shepherd's map of the British Isles about 802 AD showing the kingdom of Northumbria

Hatfield (called Heathfield historically) is an ancient settlement and a palace of the Northumbrian Kingdom called Meicen, (or Meigen).

On 12 October 633 AD, King Edwin was killed in the Battle of Hatfield Chase by Penda, King of Mercia. Penda was assisted in the battle by the Welsh under the leadership of Cadwallon ap Cadfan, Welsh (British) King of Gwynedd. Osric, a possible successor to Edwin, was also killed in the battle. Edwin's son Edfrith surrendered to Penda.

It is thought that the battle gave rise to the name of Slay Pit Lane in Hatfield, where it is rumoured that the battle took place and the bodies of soldiers lay close by.

Hatfield is mentioned in the Domesday Book as having a church, a priest, various ploughlands and plough men. The area was in the possession of William de Warenne. The name Hatfield stems from Old English (with a Scandinavian influence) of Hæþfeld; the field or open land where heather and other shrubs grew. The name was recorded by Bede as Heathfelth in 730.

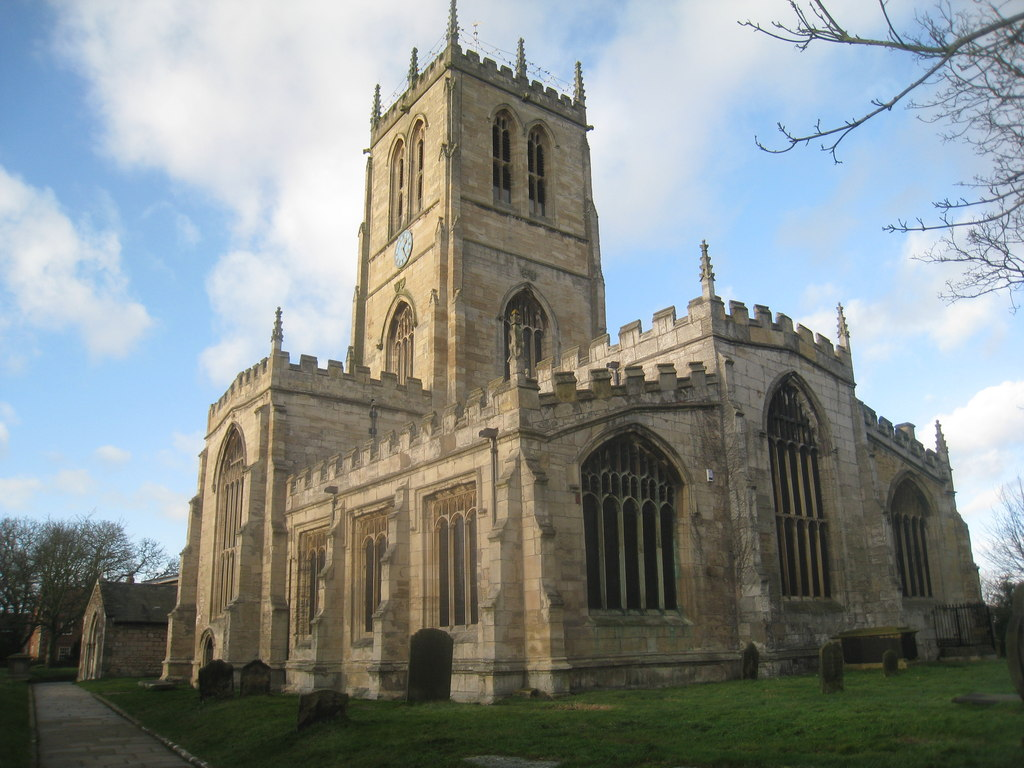
St Lawrence

Hatfield Manor House is a grade I listed building dating back to the 12th century. The site of the house was regraded as the site of the palace of Edwin, King of Northumbria. Notable visitors over the years have included Edward Balliol, Elizabeth, Countess of Ulster, John of Gaunt and Geoffrey Chaucer. The Anglican St Lawrence's Church, Hatfield was built around the same time as the manor house.

In 1629, Charles I sold almost 180,000 acres (73,000 ha) of Hatfield Chase to a Dutch engineer, Cornelius Vermuyden who sold tracts of the land to other parties and spent £400,000 draining the chase and reclaiming the land. Of the land, one third was awarded to Vermuyden, one third went to the crown and the remaining third was given to the local population as common land.

The parish of Hatfield was originally in the wapentake of Lower Strafforth and in the county of the West Riding of Yorkshire. It was moved in the county boundary changes of 1974, into South Yorkshire. The population of the parish at the 2001 census was 16,164, which had risen to 17,236 at the 2011 census.

There is an outdoor water activity centre to the north-east of the town, and two prisons, Hatfield Main and Hatfield Lakes, across the M18 to the east. HMP Lindholme is to the south-east of the town built on the former site of RAF Lindholme.

== Geography ==
Hatfield is located within the historic boundaries of the West Riding of Yorkshire on the border of Yorkshire and Lincolnshire, on the A18 road between Doncaster and Scunthorpe. The A1146 connects Hatfield with Thorne. The town is bisected by the M18 motorway. Junctions 4 and 5 of the M18, and Junction 1 of the M180 motorway are all within the parish. Hatfield is part of the parliamentary constituency of Don Valley.

Hatfield parish contains the following villages:

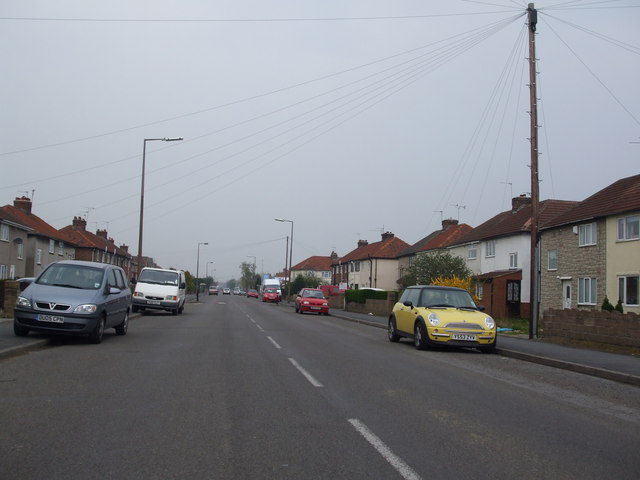
Broadway, Dunscroft

Dunscroft lies on the A18 road, about 6 miles (9.7 km) from the centre of Doncaster. There is Sheep Dip Lane primary school. The church is dedicated to St Edwin, however, it is intended to amalgamate the ecclesiastical parishes of Dunscroft and Hatfield and close St Edwin's Church.

Dunsville lies on the A18 road, about 5 miles (8 km) from the centre of Doncaster.

Hatfield lies on the A18 road, about 7 miles (11 km) from the centre of Doncaster. It is served by the Hatfield and Stainforth railway station in Stainforth and Thorne. Hatfield has numerous public houses, including The Bay Horse, The Hatfield Chase, Hatfields, The Blue Bell, The Ingram Arms and The Green Tree. The original building known as the Abbey or Dunscroft Grange was demolished in 1966–7. For the final twenty years, this building was owned by Mr Harry Lewis. The old Abbey was possibly a dormitory to Roche Abbey at Maltby. It had to be demolished because the 12th-century masonry and stonework were unstable. The main school for the area is Ash Hill Academy. There is the Travis St. Lawrence Church of England Primary School, and Hatfield Crookesbroom primary school.

Hatfield Woodhouse (House in the Hatfield Wood), is a small, semi-rural village which lies on the A614 road, about 7 miles (11 km) from the centre of Doncaster.

Hatfield Woodhouse also gave rise to RAF Hatfield Woodhouse two miles south of the village. The airfield was later named RAF Lindholme.

Recently an application has been proposed to allow the demolition of the pub and several flats to be built in its place. This application has recently been denied due to rallies by locals to have the plans rejected. There is the Hatfield Woodhouse primary school, which was rated as being Good by Ofsted in 2019.

Lindholme (Lime-tree island, (SE 682 057) is a somewhat isolated community on the site of RAF Lindholme. It is close to Hatfield Moors nature reserve as well as to three prisons (HMP Hatfield Lakes, HMP Lindholme and HMP Moorland).

West End is a small village to the south-west of Hatfield Woodhouse.

== Transport ==
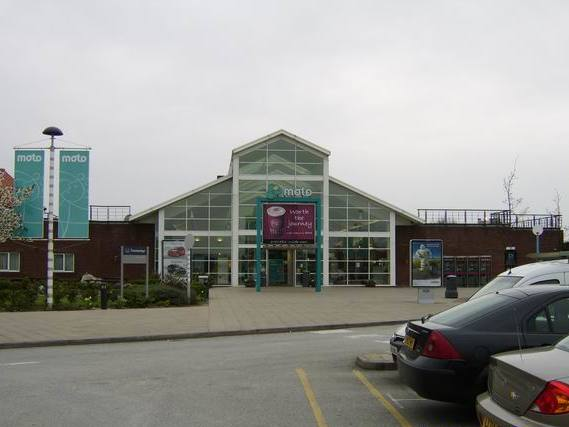
Doncaster Moto Services on the M18

The A18 road runs through the eastern part of Hatfield town, with the M18 and M180 motorways in the east of the parish. A proposal exists to develop land adjacent to the west side of Junction 5 on the M18, to a mixed development of housing and warehousing space known as Unity Park. The development, which is projected to involve housing, a marina and a new school, has led to the creation of a new link road from Junction 5 to Waggons Way in Stainforth. Junction 5 also has a motorway service area (MSA) known as Doncaster North, run by Moto.

A railway from Doncaster to Thorne first arrived in July 1856 with the station being labelled simply as Stainforth. It was replaced by a newer station called Hatfield and Stainforth in October 1866.

== Media ==
Local news and television programmes are provided by BBC Yorkshire and ITV Yorkshire Television signals are received from the Emley Moor TV transmitter.

Local radio stations are BBC Radio Sheffield, Heart Yorkshire, Capital Yorkshire, Hits Radio South Yorkshire, Greatest Hits Radio Yorkshire, TX1 Radio and TMCR 95.3, a community based radio station which broadcast from its studios in Thorne.

The town is served by these local newspapers, Doncaster Free Press and Thorne Times.

== Notable people ==
- William of Hatfield, (1336–1337), second son of Edward III
- Cornelius Vermuyden, (1595–1677), Dutch engineer who drained Hatfield Chase and was awarded huge tracts of land in the area for his efforts
- Dame Janet Baker (b. 1933), operatic mezzo-soprano closely associated with Italian Baroque repertoire and the music of Benjamin Britten. She was appointed a Dame Commander of the Order of the British Empire in 1976.

== See also ==
- Timeline of the Anglo-Saxon invasion and takeover of Britain
- Listed buildings in Hatfield, South Yorkshire
