= Moreland =

Moreland may refer to:

== Places ==
=== Australia ===
- City of Merri-bek, previously the City of Moreland, local government area in Victoria
  - Moreland railway station

=== England ===
- Moreland, Gloucester, an area and electoral ward

=== United States ===
- Moreland, Georgia, incorporated municipality in Coweta County, Georgia
- Moreland (Bethesda, Maryland), house on the National Register of Historic Places
- Moreland, Ohio, an unincorporated community
- Moreland School, a historic landmark in San Jose, California
- Moreland, Arkansas, an unincorporated community

== People ==
- Moreland (surname)
- Moreland le Blanc (born 1989), Sint Maarten cricketer

== Other uses ==
- MorelandBus, Melbourne, Australia
- Moreland Truck Company, a truck manufacturer from 1917 to 1940 in Burbank, California
- Moreland F.C., a defunct Australian football club
- Moreland Act, enacted by the New York Legislature and signed into law in 1907

== See also ==
- Moreland Township (disambiguation), several townships
- Moorland (disambiguation)
- Morland (disambiguation)
- Mooreland (disambiguation)
