= COVID-19 pandemic in England =

- Office for National Statistics weekly COVID-19 deaths for England and Wales up to May 2022.
- Disease: COVID-19
- Pathogen: SARS-CoV-2
- Location: England
- Index case: York, Yorkshire
- Arrival date: 31 January 2020 (6 years, 8 months and 5 days ago)
- Confirmed cases: 18,716,214 (up to 24 May 2022)
- Hospitalised cases: 5,111 (active, as of 30 July 2021); 422,511 (total, up to 28 July 2021)
- Ventilator cases: 785 (active, as of 30 July 2021)
- Recovered: no data
- Deaths: 113,862 (deaths within 28 days of positive test, up to 30 July 2021); 127,895 (deaths within 60 days of positive test, up to 28 March 2021); 128,507 (deaths with COVID-19 on the death certificate by date of death, up to 12 March 2021)
- Fatality rate: 202.3 (death rate per 100,000 population who died within 28 days of the first positive test); 233 (death rate per 100,000 population whose death certificate mentioned COVID-19)
- Vaccinations: 70,977,552 (total doses); 39,261,785 (88.3% – first doses); 31,715,767 (71.3% – second doses/fully vaccinated)

Government website
- UK Government

The COVID-19 pandemic was first confirmed to have spread to England with two cases among Chinese nationals staying in a hotel in York on 31 January 2020. The two main public bodies responsible for health in England were NHS England and Public Health England (PHE).

NHS England oversees the budget, planning, delivery and day-to-day operation of the commissioning side of the NHS in England, while PHE's mission is "to protect and improve the nation's health and to address inequalities". As of 14 September 2021, there had been 6,237,505 total cases and 117,955 deaths in England. In January 2021, it was estimated around 22% of people in England have had COVID-19.

Healthcare in Scotland, Wales and Northern Ireland is administered by the devolved governments, but there is no devolved government for England and so healthcare is the direct responsibility of the UK Government. As a result of each country having different policies and priorities, a variety of differences now exist between these systems.

== Timeline ==
=== Timeline of measures ===
Measures enacted	Effective from
13–23 March 2020 : Closures of the economy and first lockdown
The Premier League is suspended, initially until 3 April 2020; it returned on 17 June 2020	13 March 2020
Closures of restaurants, cafes, non essential shops, schools and nightclubs	20 March 2020
National lockdown. Everyone must stay at home; with the few exceptions being for exercise, shopping for essential items, providing medical assistance or care for another person, or for any essential work which cannot be completed at home.	23 March 2020
11 May 2020 – 4 July 2020: Lockdown easing
People are allowed to meet one other person from another household, outdoors, but to remain 2 m (6 ft) apart. Outdoor sports such as golf or tennis were allowed with members of your household or with one other person from another household, while maintaining social distancing. Households were allowed to drive any distance in England to destinations such as parks and beaches but not to Wales or Scotland.	11 May 2020
Car and caravan showrooms, outdoor sports amenities and outdoor non-food markets may reopen. The prohibitions on leaving home are replaced by a prohibition on staying overnight away from home, with certain specific exceptions. Gatherings of people from more than one household are limited to six people outdoors and indoors	1 June 2020
English Premier League football returns after a 100-day absence	17 June 2020
Hairdressers and restaurants re-open	4 July 2020
30 June 2020 – 14 October 2020: Introduction of local lockdowns and Rule of 6
Leicester goes into lockdown after a rise in cases, with many other places following until October 2020	30 June
14 September 2020
The COVID-19 tier regulations come into force, defining three levels of restrictions to be applied as necessary in geographic areas. These replace and revoke the existing local lockdown regulations. The Liverpool City Region is the first to be assigned to the strictest tier.	14 October 2020
England's second lockdown begins, with rules similar to the first, with the exceptions of schools and universities staying open	5 November 2020
2 December 2020 – 4 January 2021 : Easing of restrictions and emergence of Alpha variant
England's second lockdown ends at 12.01am, and the second tier system is adopted. Gyms, hairdressers and non-essential shops are allowed to reopen. Fans are allowed to return to English Football League grounds for the first time since March, with spectators attending six venues. Up to 1,000 fans are allowed into Luton and Wycombe, while Carlisle, Charlton, Shrewsbury and Cambridge are allowed to admit 2,000	2 December 2020
First person to get vaccinated in England	8 December 2020
4 January 2021 – 8 March 2021: Third national lockdown
Prime Minister Johnson makes a televised address in which he announces another lockdown for England, with rules similar to those in March 2020. People are permitted to leave home only for essential reasons, which include work, daily exercise, essential shopping and medical treatment. Schools are closed from the following day, though vulnerable children and those of key workers may still attend, and pre-school remains open, while university students will not return to campus but instead have online tuition. End of year examinations are once again cancelled. Grassroots sport is suspended, but not elite sport.	4 January 2021
Prime Minister Boris Johnson unveils a four-step plan for ending COVID-19 restrictions in England by 21 June	22 February 2021
Schools open, with compulsory mask wearing for students in secondary school and higher	8 March 2021
8 March – 19 July 2021: Lifting of restrictions
Pubs, restaurants, hairdressers, gyms and non-essential shops can reopen	12 April 2021
Face masks are no longer compulsory for students, and more restrictions are eased	17 May 2021
England records 0 deaths from COVID-19 over a 24-hour period for the first time since March 2020	1 June 2021
Prime Minister Boris Johnson announces that England's relaxation of COVID-19 restrictions planned for 21 June will be delayed by four weeks, until 19 July. The cap on wedding parties will be removed though.	14 June 2021
More than 60,000 people are allowed to attend England's Euro 2020 semi-final match with Denmark at Wembley Stadium, meaning the stadium is at 75% capacity.	7 July 2021
19 July 2021 – COVID-19 restrictions eased, but tightened as Omicron variant spreads
The final stage of COVID restrictions are lifted in England, allowing nightclubs to reopen and abolishing social distancing rules, while face covering rules are relaxed.	19 July 2021
Vaccination opens for teenagers aged 12–15	22 September 2021
New rules come into force allowing fully vaccinated travellers returning to England to take lateral flow tests instead of PCR tests.	24 October 2021
Birmingham's German Christmas Market returns after its cancellation in 2020. The event is smaller than in previous years, and Birmingham City Council warns it could change or close if COVID restrictions return.	4 November 2021
Face masks return for secondary school pupils in communal areas.	29 November 2021
Attendees of nightclubs and large events must produce an NHS COVID Pass to enter.	15 December 2021
Anyone over the age of 65 who has not had the booster within 4 months of their second dose, or anyone who initially received the J&J/Janssen single-dose vaccine before the 15th of October who has not had a second dose before the 15th of December, must receive a booster to reactivate their health pass.	15 December 2021
The UK government announces that face masks are to be worn in classrooms in England when classes resume following the Christmas holiday	3 January 2022

=== September 2019 – January 2020 : Suspected cases ===
In May 2020, the BBC reported that several members of a choir in Yorkshire had developed COVID-19-like symptoms shortly after the partner of one of the choir members returned from a business trip to Wuhan, China, on 17 or 18 December.

Earlier, in March 2020, it was reported that a 50-year-old man from East Sussex fell ill with COVID-19 symptoms on 20 January after he returned from Ischgl in Austria; the resort was under investigation because it allegedly failed to report possible cases. Three members of his family, two friends from Denmark and one from Minnesota, US had the same symptoms.

In June 2020, the BBC reported it was found COVID-19 in the UK had at least 1,356 origins, mostly from Italy (late February), Spain (early-to-mid-March), and France (mid-to-late-March). In the same month, it was reported that a 53-year-old woman fell ill on 6 January, two days after returning from Obergurgl resort in Austria.

In August 2020, the Kent coroner reportedly certified that the death of Peter Attwood (aged 84) on 30 January had been related to COVID-19 ('COVID-19 infection and bronchopneumonia', according to an email on 3 September, after COVID-19 was detected in his lung tissue), making him the first confirmed England and UK death from the disease. He first showed symptoms on 15 December 2019. Attwood had not travelled abroad.

In November 2020, it was reported that a 66-year-old man had experienced symptoms of COVID-19 shortly after returning from holiday in Italy in September 2019, and his 44-year-old daughter had experienced similar symptoms. Scientists had previously speculated about COVID-19 in Italy as early as September 2019.

=== January 2020 ===
On 31 January, two members of a family of Chinese nationals staying in a hotel in York, one of whom studied at the University of York, became the first confirmed cases of COVID-19 in the UK. Upon confirmation, they were transferred from Hull University Teaching Hospital to a specialist isolation facility, a designated High Consequence Infectious Diseases Unit in Newcastle upon Tyne's Royal Victoria Infirmary.

On the same day, an evacuation flight from Wuhan landed at RAF Brize Norton and the passengers, none of whom were showing symptoms, were taken to quarantine, in a staff residential block at Arrowe Park Hospital on the Wirral. There had previously been contention over whether the government should assist the repatriation of UK passport holders from the most affected areas in China, or restrict travel from affected regions altogether. Some British nationals in Wuhan had been informed that they could be evacuated but any spouses or children with mainland Chinese passports could not. This was later overturned, but the delay meant that some people missed the flight.

=== February 2020 ===
On 6 February, a third confirmed case, a man who had recently travelled to Singapore prior to visiting a ski resort in the Haute-Savoie, France, was reported in Brighton. He had been the source of infection to six of his relatives during a stay in France, before returning to the UK on 28 January. Following confirmation of his result, the UK's CMOs expanded the number of countries where a history of previous travel associated with flu-like symptoms – such as fever, cough and difficulty breathing – in the previous 14 days would require self-isolation and calling NHS 111. These countries included China, Hong Kong, Japan, Macau, Malaysia, Republic of Korea, Singapore, Taiwan and Thailand.

On 10 February, the total number of cases in the UK reached eight as four further cases were confirmed in people linked to the affected man from Brighton. Globally, the virus had spread to 28 countries. On the morning of 10 February, the Secretary of State for Health and Social Care, Matt Hancock, announced the Health Protection (Coronavirus) Regulations 2020, to give public health professionals "strengthened powers" to keep affected people and those believed to be a possible risk of having the virus, in isolation. That day, the Arrowe Park Hospital, Merseyside, and the Kents Hill Park hotel and conference centre, Milton Keynes became designated isolation units. The following day, two of the eight confirmed cases in the UK were reported by BBC News to be general practitioners. A ninth case was confirmed in London on 11 February.

=== March 2020 ===
Lockdown in Manchester

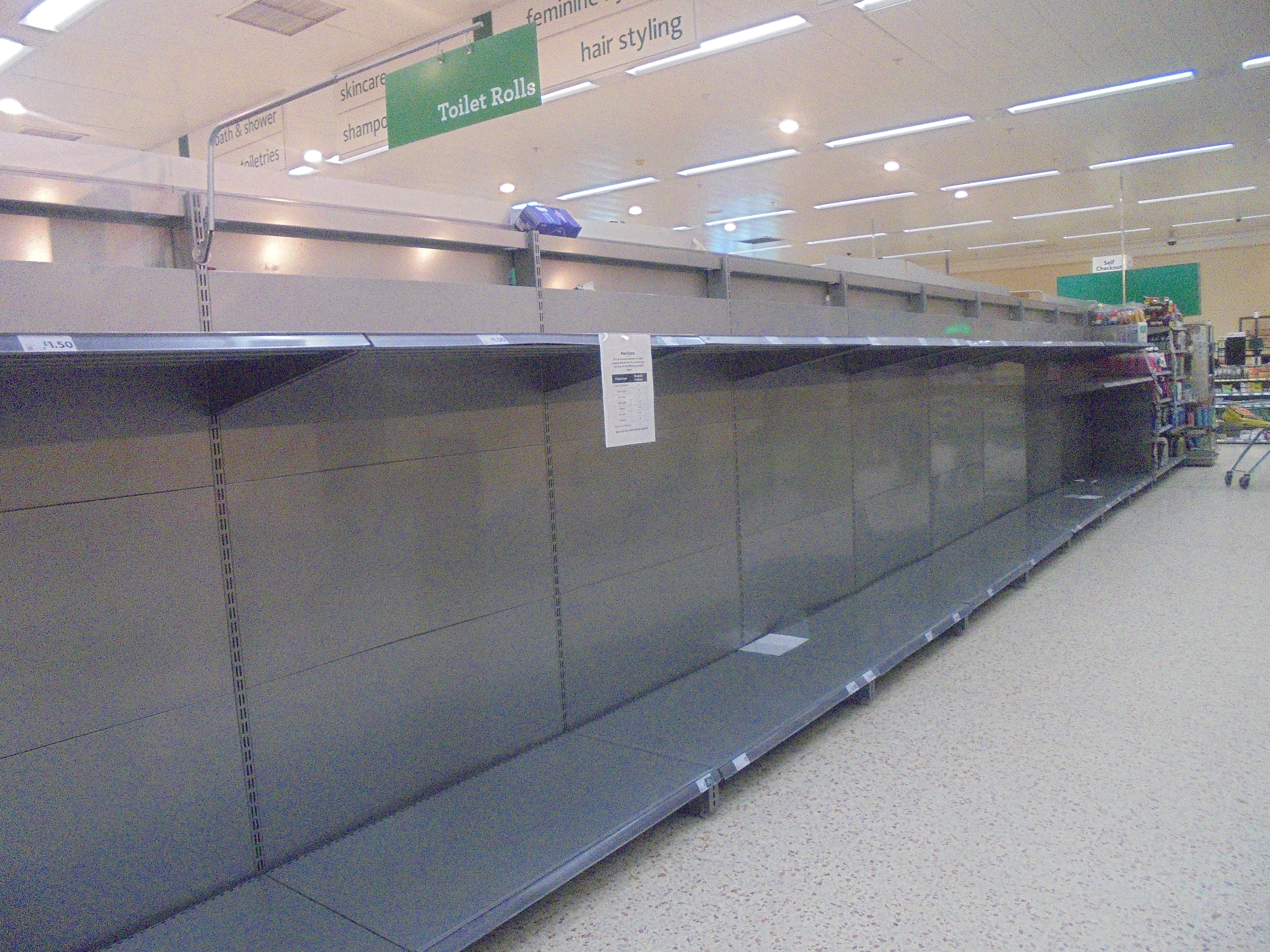
The effects of panic buying in a Morrisons supermarket in Wetherby, West Yorkshire

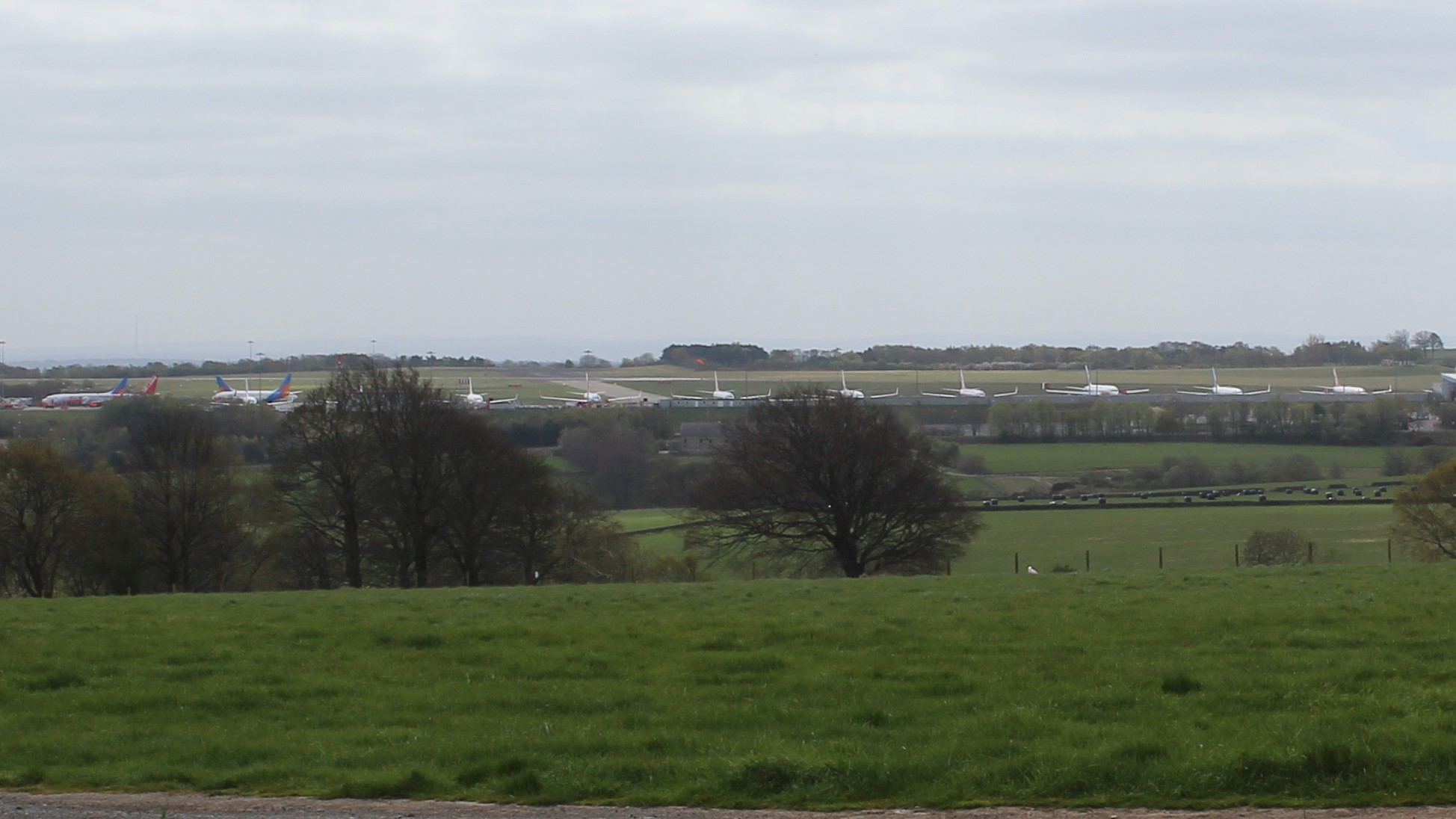
Grounded aircraft at Leeds Bradford Airport in April 2020

On 1 March, further cases were reported in Greater Manchester, some of them believed to be contacts of the case in Surrey who had no history of travel abroad.

On 2 March, four further people in England tested positive. All had recently travelled from Italy; they were from Hertfordshire, Devon and Kent. The total number of UK cases was reported as having reached 40, though this was revised to 39 after additional testing. The following day, when the number of confirmed cases in the UK stood at 51, the UK government unveiled their Coronavirus Action Plan, which outlined what the UK had done already and what it planned to do next.

On 2 March, the first COVID-19 death occurred in a care home, but at that time care home data were not yet published.

On 3 March, the first three hospital deaths were reported in Nottingham, Essex, and Buckinghamshire.

On 15 March, the COVID-19 Hospitalisation in England Surveillance System (CHESS) was initiated across all NHS Trusts.

On 17 March, NHS England announced that all non-urgent operations would be postponed from 15 April to free up 30,000 beds. Additionally, many patients were discharged into care homes, initially this thought to have caused significant infections, and as a result deaths in care homes, however it is now believed that community infections were responsible for the infections. Also on 17 March, Chancellor Rishi Sunak announced that £330bn would be made available in loan guarantees for businesses affected by the pandemic.

By 18 March, over 1,000 patients were in hospital with COVID-19. This number rapidly grew and by 31 March exceeded 11,000. Admissions to hospital grew from less than 700 a day on 20 March to more than 2,400 a day by 31 March.

By 20 March, genome sequencing had identified ten viral lineages of COVID-19 in England (A, B, B1, B10, B10.2, B11, B12.1, B5, B8, B9). The research, which was at an early stage, concluded that the data were consistent with a large number of independent introductions into the UK, from places around the world, particularly Italy and other European countries. It was very likely that the true number of independent introductions was substantially higher.

By 31 March, England was the worst affected country in the United Kingdom with over 21,000 confirmed infections; In March there were around 4,500 deaths in hospital but more than 6,700 patients who had recovered were discharged.

ONS data for England and Wales suggests that by 31 March, England had seen over 200 COVID-19 deaths in care homes and more than 200 deaths at home.

=== April 2020 ===
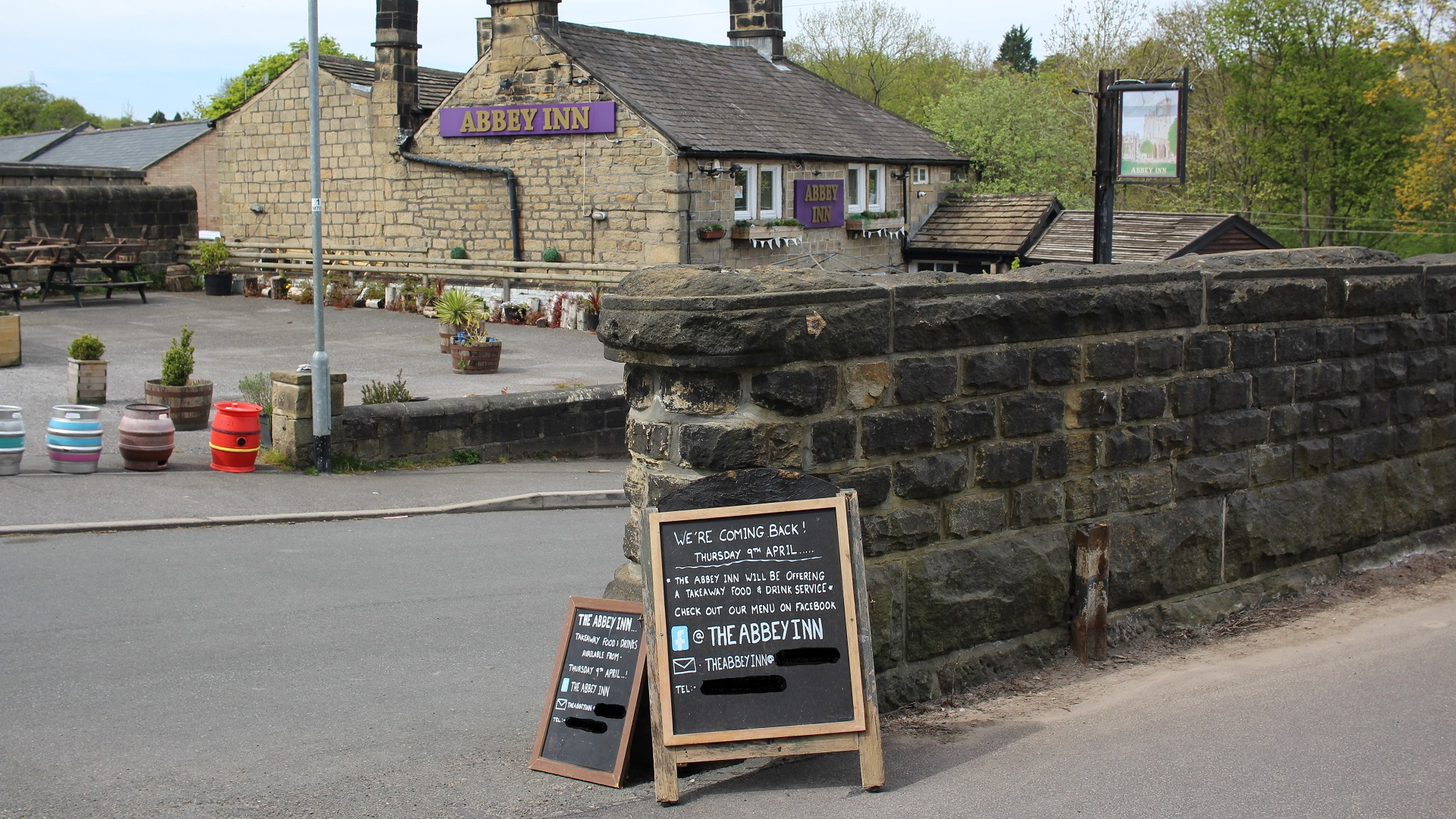
A closed public house offering a takeaway service

On 2 April the maximum number of hospital admissions in a day during the first wave was reached (around 3,000 patients); the number of daily hospital deaths from COVID-19 was now more than 600.

On 12 April, the number of patients in hospital, for the first wave, peaked at 18,974 and the number of daily admissions due to COVID-19 had reduced to less than 1,900; more than 700 COVID-19 hospital deaths were recorded.

Up to 24 April, ONS death registrations for England and Wales showed 19,643 had occurred in hospital, 5,890 in care homes, 1,306 in private homes and 301 in hospices. Of these deaths, 1,149 occurred in Wales.

On 29 April, the method of reporting deaths in England was changed. Data from three sources are now cross checked against the list of people who have had a diagnosis of COVID-19 confirmed by a Public Health England or NHS laboratory. The three sources are:

1. data supplied to NHS England by the Hospital Trusts,
2. data from Public Health England Health Protection teams (mainly deaths not in hospitals),
3. Information obtained by linking the Second Generation Surveillance System (SGSS) to the NHS Demographic Batch Service.

After checking, the records are merged into one database and duplicates removed so there is no double counting.

The new method of counting deaths results in higher numbers than the previous method. On 29 April, the total number of deaths reported by NHS England was 21,400. The new method identified 23,550 deaths of people who had a positive test result confirmed by a PHE or NHS laboratory.

The number of patients with COVID-19 in hospital steadily reduced until on 30 April it was around 12,900; at least 54,100 patients were admitted to hospital in April with COVID-19. The total number of deaths in hospital during April from COVID-19 exceeded 17,500; this data suggest that there were around 36,000 patients who had the disease that were discharged in April.

In April, the ITV News health and science editor Emily Morgan filmed inside the intensive care unit at the Royal Bournemouth Hospital in Dorset, showing critically ill coronavirus patients being treated. It was the first time cameras in the UK had been allowed to film inside an intensive care unit.

=== May 2020 ===
By May 3, 2020, daily admissions to hospital had further reduced to around 1,000, while discharges continued to exceed admissions and thus the number of people in hospital was around 10,500.

An app for the adult social care workforce in England was launched on 6 May to support workers during the COVID-19 outbreak. The Care Workforce app was developed by NHSX and the NHS Business Services Authority. The GMB union told members not to use the app, saying that managers could identify staff who had complained about pay, testing and personal protective equipment through a chat feature.

On 11 May, a set of COVID Alert Levels were published by the Government and many restrictions in England were eased; people who were unable to work from home were encouraged to return to work, but where possible avoid public transport.

On 12 May, the number of people in hospital fell below 10,000 and the total number of deaths in hospital since 1 March had grown to at least 24,500.

By 21 May, the number of hospital patients was below 8,000 and daily admissions were around 700.

On 21 May, the lockdown rules were amended in England to allow people to meet one other person from another household, outdoors, but to remain 2 m (6 ft) apart. Outdoor sports such as golf or tennis were allowed with members of the same household or with one other person from another household, while maintaining social distancing. Households were allowed to drive any distance in England to destinations such as parks and beaches, but not to Wales or Scotland.

On 27 May, Matt Hancock announced NHS Test and Trace would begin operations the following day.

The number of patients in hospital with COVID-19 continued to reduce and on 31 May was around 5,900. During the month at least 22,400 patients were admitted to hospital with COVID-19, the number of hospital deaths was around 5,200 and around 23,900 patients were discharged.

=== June 2020 ===
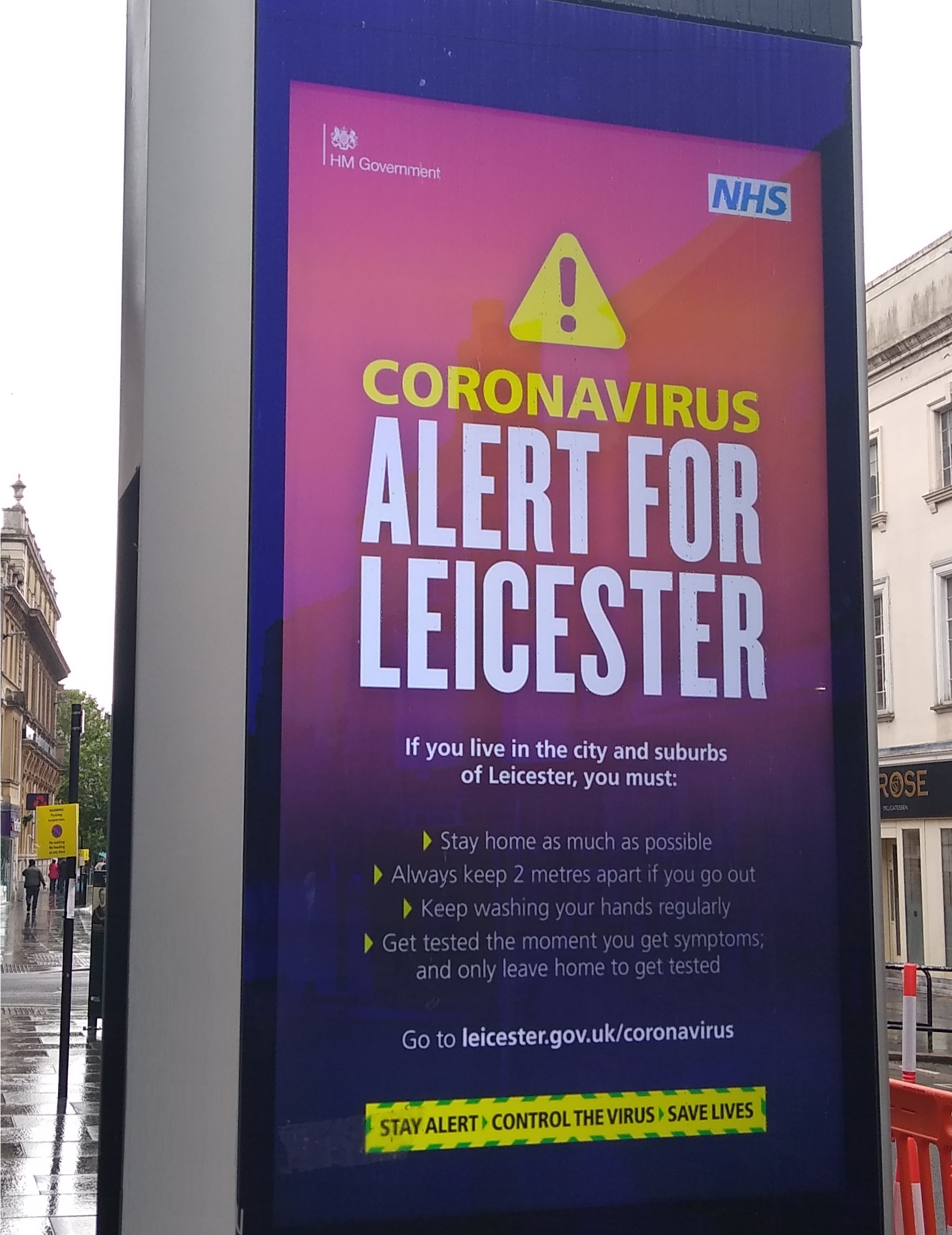
Leicester: the first 'local lockdown'

A study published on June 8 which included genome sequencing data concluded that in mid to late February travel from Italy had resulted in the majority of importations. By 1 March, this had changed to Spain and by mid-March it changed again to France; because of the travel restrictions imposed, importations after mid April were at very low levels. It was estimated that around half of the importations were by UK nationals returning to the UK. In the period up to 3 May, approximately 34% of detected UK transmission lineages arrived via travel from Spain, 29% from France, 14% from Italy and 23% from other countries. Less than 0.1% were from China.

By June 15, the number of people in hospital had fallen steadily to around 3,900 and daily admissions were down to around 360, but each day there were still around 50 deaths reported.

On June 30, the government imposed the first local lockdown in the UK after 10% of all positive cases in the UK over the past week were found in Leicester. Non-essential shops in the city had to close, and the public houses and restaurants hoping to reopen on 4 July had to delay opening for at least two weeks; schools would also be shut for most pupils.

By 30 June daily COVID-19 hospital admissions were fewer than 200 and COVID-19 daily deaths in hospital were around 30; the total number in hospital with COVID-19 was fewer than 2,700.

=== July 2020 ===
On Friday 24 July 2020 new regulations made it compulsory to wear face coverings in most indoor shops, shopping centres, banks, post offices and public transport hubs. Those breaking the rules could be fined up to £100. Face coverings remained optional in other indoor public places including museums, cinemas and hairdressers. Excluded from the regulations were venues where wearing a mask might be 'impractical', such as restaurants and gyms. Exemptions were available for children under 11, individuals with physical or mental illness or disability, and for anyone to whom it would cause significant distress.

On 24 July it was reported that, as a result of the pandemic and job losses, almost 1,000 people applied to a restaurant in Manchester advertising a vacancy for a receptionist.

Indoor gyms and pools started to re-open on 25 July.

During July the total number of COVID-19 hospital admissions fell to around 3,050, the number of deaths in hospital from COVID-19 fell to around 480, and around 4,200 patients with the disease were discharged from hospitals.

=== August 2020 ===
August saw the fewest monthly hospital admissions (1,600) since the start of the pandemic and hospital deaths (208); the number of patients in hospital on 31 August was under 500. Throughout August the daily hospital death rate was essentially in single digits.

The rules aimed at stopping the spread of the virus were eased on 15 August: casinos, bowling alleys and conference halls were among a range of venues allowed to reopen across much of England. Also permitted were indoor performances with socially distanced live audiences (including in theatres and sports stadiums), wedding receptions for up to 30 people, skating rinks and beauticians as long as they had measures in place to reduce COVID-19 transmission. Beauticians, tattooists, spas and tanning salons could offer additional services, including front-of-face treatments such as eyebrow threading.

=== September 2020 ===
On 2 September the minimum number of hospital patients since the start of the pandemic was recorded (451); hospital admissions were around 60 a day at the start of the month. Until 12 September, the number of deaths in hospital was essentially in single digits but thereafter rose until it was around 40 a day by the end of the month.

On 8 September, following a rise in case numbers, the government published new social distancing rules to come into effect in England from 14 September. These restricted gatherings of separate households to groups of six or few people (the so-called "rule of six"), excluding work or educational settings. By 18 September, the COVID Symptom Study estimated the $R_0$ value in England to be 1.4, meaning that cases were doubling every seven days.

Hospital admissions in September were around 5,900. There were around 560 deaths in hospital and more than 3,750 discharges of patients who had caught COVID-19.

=== October 2020 ===
Between July and September 2020, ever more extensive and increasingly rigorous ad hoc local regulations were introduced, which in many areas proved unsuccessful in controlling the spread of the virus. In England, all of these local regulations were swept away on 14 October, and replaced by new tier regulations with three levels of restrictions.

The easing of restrictions and emergence of a second more infectious variant of COVID-19 resulted in a second wave of the virus becoming well established. Hospital admissions rose from less than 6,000 in September to over 25,000 in October. Almost 3,500 people who had tested positive for COVID-19 in the previous 28 days died in hospital from COVID-19 but more than 14,700 patients were discharged.

=== November 2020 ===
After further forecasts predicting unsustainable pressure on the healthcare system, new uniform national restrictions were put in place from 5 November to at least 2 December. On 8 November, 1 million cases had been confirmed in England.

Despite these tighter regulations, the number of hospital admissions during November was more than 41,200; deaths in hospital of patients who had tested positive for COVID-19 in the previous 28 days was around 8,300 with 29,000 patient discharges. On 30 November there were 13,700 people in hospital. It is now known that, in London, the new variant of COVID-19 accounted for around 25% of the cases.

=== December 2020 ===
From 2 December, the national restrictions were replaced by a second version of tier regulations, again with three levels; 57% of the population was placed in Tier 2 and 42% in the strictest Tier 3. The government also announced that, from 23 December to 27 December, a 'Christmas bubble' would be permitted, allowing people from up to three households to meet in private homes and/or gardens, and travel between tiers for the purpose of meeting others in the same bubble.

After the existence of the new variant – referred to as Variant of Concern 202012/01 – was announced the government issued new public health guidance and were expected to impose transit restrictions. By mid-December around two-thirds of the cases reported in London were the new variant. On 19 December it was announced that a new "tier four" measure would be applied to Bedfordshire, Berkshire, Buckinghamshire, Hertfordshire, Kent, London and parts of Cambridgeshire, East Sussex, Essex and Surrey, and Christmas season relaxation would be limited to only Christmas Day.

These attempts at controlling the second wave had limited success: the total number of hospital admissions rose again during December to more than 58,600, and deaths in hospital of patients who had tested positive for COVID-19 in the previous 28 days approached 10,600. Although almost 39,000 patients were discharged there were still more than 22,700 people in hospital on 31 December.

=== January 2021 ===
On 1 January, the government announced that all primary schools in London would remain closed. This caused uproar from many headmasters and teaching staff in other areas. On 4 January the majority of primary schools opened. That evening, Boris Johnson made a televised address to the nation, announcing a third lockdown in England. The rules were similar to the first lockdown in March 2020 and schools would close for most pupils on 5 January. In view of the increase of hospitalized cases, the government's slogan was changed back to "Stay Home, Protect the NHS, Save Lives." On 25 January, Boris Johnson said the government would give an update on when schools can reopen in England as soon as they could. On the same day, the Health Secretary Matt Hancock said there were early signs that the current restrictions are working, but it was not a moment to ease them.

The peak of hospital admissions occurred on 12 January at 4,134 patients; the peak number of people in hospital occurred almost a week later on 18 January at 34,336, this is over 80% higher than that recorded in the first wave of the pandemic. In January, the total number of patients with COVID-19 admitted to hospital exceeded 100,000, more than 22,000 patients who had tested positive for COVID-19 in the previous 28 days died but there were over 73,200 discharges.

On 30 January 2021, a group of asylum seekers set light to a barracks building at Napier Barracks, where they had been housed temporarily pending resolution of their cases. The asylum seekers were beset by COVID-19 at the rate of one person in four. Coventry South MP Zarah Sultana called on the government to "provide good, safe and liveable housing instead".

=== February 2021 ===
On 1 February, door to door testing was announced to identify cases of the South African variant. There would be around 80,000 tests across 8 different areas of the country where the 11 cases were found that had no travel history. The cumulative total of deaths had surpassed 100,000 by 9 February. On 22 February, Boris Johnson announced the roadmap out of lockdown starting on 8 March with schools and colleges reopening and the lockdown ending on 21 June with nearly all restrictions being lifted.

By the end of February, daily cases were as low as they were during September 2020, with 5,080 cases being reported in England on 28 February.

In February, more than 35,800 people were admitted to hospital with COVID-19, around 9,400 patients who had tested positive for COVID-19 in the previous 28 days died but more than 44,200 patients recovered and were discharged.

=== March 2021 ===
On 3 March, there were fewer than 10,000 patients in hospitals for the first time since 1 November 2020. Students returned to face-to-face education in schools and colleges on 8 March, with rapid testing being carried out in secondary schools. By 13 March, over 20 million people had received their first dose of vaccinations, as well as over 1 million people having received their second dose. There had been a surge of infections in many countries of Europe, however the current roadmap out of England's lockdown would still go as planned. On March 29, the next phase of easing the lockdown took place, with people being able to meet up in groups of 6 or 2 households outdoors, and outdoor sporting facilities could reopen. Cases began to drop towards the end of March, with less than 3,000 people getting infected a day.

In March, just over 11,400 were admitted to hospital, around 2,090 people who had tested positive for COVID-19 in the previous 28 days died in hospital and more than 17,000 people were discharged.

=== April 2021 ===
On 5 April, Boris Johnson announced the next phase of the lockdown easing would go as planned, with pubs and non-essential shops reopening from 12 April. Over 10 million people had been fully vaccinated by 23 April with the cumulative total of second doses exceeding 10 million. On 18 April a one-day "trial" festival at Sefton Park, Liverpool on 2 May that year was announced, to be headlined by band Blossoms. The festival was notable as it was to be the first festival in the UK for fourteen months with no social distancing or face masks following the worldwide COVID-19 pandemic.

In April, just over 4,000 people with COVID-19 had been admitted to hospital; around 450 patients who had tested positive for COVID-19 in the previous 28 days died but over 5,400 people were discharged. The number of people in hospital with COVID-19 on 30 April was 1,161 and daily admissions from the disease had dropped to around 80.

The effectiveness of the vaccine is beginning to become apparent as ONS data shows that as a percentage of all deaths from COVID-19 those in care homes has reduced from around 20% a week at its peak to less than 15% in April.

=== May 2021 ===
On 6 May, there were fewer than 1,000 patients with COVID-19 in hospital; the last time this had happened was mid-September 2020. On 20 May the number of COVID-19 patients in hospital was 749, the last time this level had occurred was mid-September 2020. Cases began to rise towards the end of May, mostly in the North West. This was due to the spread of the Delta (Indian) variant.

Just over 2,600 people were admitted to hospital in May, there were 170 deaths in hospital of people who had tested positive for COVID-19 in the previous 28 days; more than 2,700 patients recovered from the virus and were discharged.

=== June 2021 ===
At the beginning of June the Delta variant had become the dominant strain in England, the increased transmission rate associated with it had resulted in a small increase in daily admissions and the number of people in hospital was now around 800. On 14 June it was announced that the final step of easing the lockdown on 21 June would be delayed for 4 weeks until 19 July. Government research found a 50% increase in infections from 3 May to 7 June, and an increase in the Delta variant, which became dominant in the UK. The rise in infections is, however, strongest among younger, unvaccinated patients. Older, vaccinated people are less at risk. A third wave of infections had begun in June, and around 110,000 swab tests carried out in England from 20 May to 7 June appeared to show COVID-19 cases were doubling every 11 days. The disease was most common in the north-west and one person in 670 was infected.

COVID-19 hospital admissions in June were slightly higher than May at around 405,700 and the number of people in hospital with COVID-19 at the end of June was almost double that for the end of May at 1,560; there were 247 hospital deaths in June of people who had tested positive for COVID-19 in the previous 28 days. Over 4,100 COVID-19 patients were discharged in June.

=== July 2021 ===
In July, cases began to rise rapidly. On 19 July, the 4 week delayed "Freedom Day" took place. Social distancing and mask wearing became optional, and night clubs were allowed to re-open, however self-isolation remained mandatory for close contacts of a positive case. The total number of infections in England surpassed 5 million on 27 July. Despite the rise in cases, deaths and hospitalisations had been lower compared to the previous waves before due to the vaccination programme. Cases began to fall after 17 July when 50,955 cases were reported, however scientists believed that it was too early to say if infection rates had dropped.

Over 19,000 people were admitted to hospital with COVID-19 in July, more than 1,140 people died in hospital from COVID-19 but there almost 14,500 patients had been discharged after recovering.

ONS data showed that as a percentage of all deaths from COVID-19, those in care homes has fallen from around 20% at its peak to around 10%.

=== August 2021 ===
Self-isolation rules changed: from 16 August those who had been in contact with a positive COVID-19 case no longer needed to self-isolate if they were fully vaccinated or under the age of 18. With more social and household mixing, there has been an inevitable rise in hospital admissions to more than 23,000; the number of people dying in hospital from COVID-19 was almost double that of July at 2,100. August saw more than 19,800 hospital discharges.

=== September 2021 ===
During September, the number of people in hospital continued to rise and the weekly number of excess deaths from other causes increased to around 600. Hospital deaths from COVID-19 during September were around 2500 and there were almost 18,500 discharges.

On 14 September, Prime Minister Johnson warned that COVID-19 remained a risk in England as the autumn and winter approached, and unveiled the government's plans to protect the NHS. This included continued testing, tracing, and prioritizing the vaccination of children 12–15 (with drop-in clinics to be run at schools), those who are not yet vaccinated, and the booster dose programme. Businesses would also be encouraged to voluntarily use the NHS COVID Pass.

Johnson also discussed a "Plan B" that would be implemented in the event the NHS is in danger of being overwhelmed, which would include reinstating mandatory masking in certain settings, and mandating proof of vaccination for large gatherings and other settings. Johnson stated that the implementation of "Plan B" would be based on multiple metrics (including hospitalizations, caseloads, and other factors), and would "give us the confidence that we don't have to go back to the lockdowns of the past.". If implemented, Plan B would bring England in line with restrictions in the remainder of the Home Nations.

=== October 2021 ===
The NHS Confederation and the British Medical Association urged the government to implement "Plan B" for COVID-19 in the winter due to a backlog of five million patients. However, the government stated that there were currently no plans to do so. The number of people in hospital at the end of October was around 50% greater than at the end of September, the number of deaths in hospital was around 2,500 and there were around 18,000 discharges.

=== November 2021 ===
On 27 November, the first UK cases of the Omicron variant were found in Essex and Nottingham. New restrictions went into force, including several African countries being placed on the Red list for travel, mandating PCR testing of anyone entering the UK from outside the Common Travel Area, masks becoming mandatory on public transport and at shops, and all close contacts of an Omicron variant case being required to self-isolate regardless of vaccination status.

=== December 2021 ===
On 8 December, Johnson announced that "Plan B" would be activated in England due to concerns over the Omicron variant and the increasing rate of infections it could cause, explaining that "the best way to ensure we all have a Christmas as close to normal as possible is to get on with Plan B." Workers were advised to stay at home if possible. On 10 December, mask mandates were extended to cinemas and theatres. From 15 December, the NHS COVID Pass became mandatory at nightclubs, unseated indoor events with 500 attendees or more, unseated outdoor events with 4,000 attendees or more, and any event with more than 10,000 attendees. Hospital admissions during December were around 50% higher than in November at around 33,800 patients, however, hospital deaths were slightly lower at around 2,500; more than 24,400 patients were discharged in December.

=== January 2022 ===
On 19 January 2022, Johnson announced that the "Plan B" restrictions would end from 27 January. Johnson cited booster vaccination progress and reports that Omicron had peaked as justification, but warned that "we must learn to live with COVID in the same way we live with flu". There were almost 54,000 hospital admissions in January along with over 4,700 deaths. Over 48,000 patients were discharged from hospital in January.

=== February 2022 ===
In February more people with COVID-19 were discharged from hospital (around 32,000) than were admitted (around 30,000). Another 2,800 hospital patients who had the virus died.

=== March 2022 ===
The government decided to cut down on the number of people in England who would be eligible for free influenza vaccination in autumn 2022: people aged 50–64 and school children aged 11–15 would no longer qualify. Nick Kaye of the National Pharmacy Association said, "It's short-sighted to cut back on this sensible public health measure, given that no one can say for certain that we'll be through the Covid pandemic by next winter", adding that hospitals would be overstretched for years and free flu vaccination helps keep people out of hospital. Giulia Guerrini of online pharmacy Medino maintained that vaccination mattered since, "immune systems are lower than ever due to our bodies having had a lower amount of exposure to viruses than normal over the last two years". March saw another large increase in hospital admissions of patients with COVID-19 (over 52,000), and patients who died having tested positive for COVID-19 increased to around 3,250.

=== April 2022 ===
Hospital admissions of patients testing positive for COVID-19 reduced to fewer than 45,000 in April and the number discharged was around 47,000. The number of deaths in hospital of patients who had tested positive for COVID-19 was just over 4,000. Free COVID-19 testing was stopped for most individuals and the majority of Lighthouse labs that supplied centralised COVID-19 testing were closed.

== Hospital death statistics ==
Statistics for deaths in hospital up to 30 December 2020 showed that those with a pre-existing condition – especially diabetes, chromic kidney disease, dementia or ischaemic heart disease but also asthma, chronic neurological or pulmonary disease – were around twenty-three times more likely to die than those who did not have one. Age and sex also influenced the risk of death, with men between 60 and 79 showing a death rate almost double that of women. Men over 80 were over 30% more likely to die than women in the same age group. The percentages in each category showed only small changes through the year.

Statistics for deaths in hospital for 2021 showed only small changes from the data recorded in 2020 but the effectiveness of vaccination did result in lower death rates in those over 80, particularly for men.

=== 2020 ===
Deaths by age range, presence of pre-condition and sex
Age range	Pre-condition	No known pre-condition	Female	Male
0–19 years	0.04%	0.01%	0.02%	0.03%
20–39 years	0.54%	0.09%	0.27%	0.36%
40–59 years	6.06%	0.68%	2.42%	4.33%
60–79 years	36.09%	1.70%	13.38%	24.53%
80+ years	53.04%	1.63%	23.67%	30.99%
Total	95.9%	4.1%	39.8%	60.2%

=== 2021 ===
Deaths by age range, presence of pre-condition and sex
Age range	Pre-condition	No known pre-condition	Female	Male
0–19 years	0.08%	0.03%	0.06%	0.05%
20–39 years	0.88%	0.20%	0.44%	0.64%
40–59 years	7.86%	1.04%	3.46%	5.43%
60–79 years	37.72%	2.03%	15.27%	24.47%
80+ years	48.58%	1.59%	22.90%	27.27%
Total	95.1%	4.9%	42.1%	57.9%

== ONS data ==
=== Registered deaths ===
The Office of National Statistics publishes data on weekly deaths in England and Wales, which include information on deaths from COVID-19. These data give the number of deaths registered in England during a seven-day period; the total number of deaths will be greater as there is normally a delay between the date death occurred and the date it is registered.

==== 2020 ====
Up to and including the week ending 6 March 2020, the number of deaths in England was on average 442 fewer each week than the five-year average (2015–2019). The number of deaths above the average is generally referred to as 'excess' deaths, in both 2020 and 2012 the data were influenced by many factors including the lockdowns, social distancing, mask wearing, reduced elective surgery and less medical diagnosis and care. This resulted in very few deaths from influenza, slightly less from road traffic accident but more because people did not seek or were unable to get healthcare.

The total number of excess deaths in England for the whole of 2020, based on the 5 year average for 2015–2019, was 71,677 but if the starting point of the pandemic is taken as 6 March, the total number of excess deaths would be more than 76,000. A recent BMJ paper based on a 4-year average (2016–2019) reported a value of 85,400 (83,900 to 86,800 (95% confidence intervals)) excess deaths for England and Wales in 2020; on a pro rata basis this would give a value of around 79,800 for England.

The registration data were affected by closure of the registry offices over bank holidays, Christmas and the New Year. In addition, 2020 was a 53-week year.

Registered Deaths in England 2 March 2020 – 1 January 2021
Week Ending	All Recorded Deaths	COVID-19 Deaths	5 Year Average	Total Excess Deaths	Week Ending	All Recorded Deaths	COVID-19 Deaths	5 Year Average	Total Excess Deaths
6 March	10,225	0	–	0	7 August	8,365	128	8,502	55,569
13 March	10,317	5	10,447	-130	14 August	8,767	125	8,494	55,842
20 March	9,903	100	9,841	-68	21 August	9,021	126	8,560	56,303
27 March	10,412	515	9,414	930	28 August	8,425	97	7,674	57,054
3 April	15,443	3,330	9,601	6,772	4 September	7,232	74	8,604	55,682
10 April	17,563	5,899	9,807	14,528	11 September	9,215	97	8,708	56,189
17 April	21,157	8,335	9,787	25,898	18 September	8,955	134	8,663	56,481
24 April	20,841	7,806	9,768	36,971	25 September	9,005	203	8,744	56,742
1 May	17,004	5,748	9,289	44,686	2 October	9,257	296	8,942	57,057
8 May	11,946	3,716	8,937	47,695	9 October	9,308	401	9,168	57,197
15 May	13,783	3,624	9,526	51,952	16 October	9,833	622	9,215	57,815
22 May	11,586	2,455	9,299	54,239	23 October	10,070	913	9,104	58,781
29 May	9,228	1,715	7,607	55,860	30 October	10,166	1,258	9,248	59,699
5 June	9,995	1,488	9,346	56,509	6 November	10,962	1,771	9,675	60,986
12 June	9,391	1,057	8,803	57,097	13 November	11,495	2,274	9,662	62,819
19 June	8,716	744	8,810	57,003	20 November	11,675	2,471	9,701	64,793
26 June	8,414	574	8,695	56,722	27 November	11,645	2,820	9,690	66,748
3 July	8,542	497	8,606	56,658	4 December	11,450	2,623	9,995	68,203
10 July	8,103	344	8,648	56,113	11 December	11,460	2,530	10,034	69,629
17 July	8,262	284	8,502	55,873	18 December	12,113	2,729	10,804	70,938
24 July	8,317	209	8,452	55,738	25 December	10,680	2,631	7,421	74,197
31 July	8,404	183	8,436	55,706	1 January	9,325	2,831	7,421	76,101

==== 2021 ====
For the first nine weeks of 2021 the total number of excess deaths in 2021 continued to increase, then from 12 March it started to reduce, this in likely to be in part is because some of the people who died prematurely from COVID-19 would have succumbed to something else at a slightly later date. At the beginning of July the number of excess deaths started to rise again, many of these deaths are not attributed to COVID-19 which suggests delays in obtaining diagnosis and subsequent treatment in 2020 and 2021 has starting to influence the data. The data are affected by a number of public holidays; 2 and 9 April – Good Friday and Easter Monday Bank Holiday, 7 May – Spring Bank Holiday, 30 August – Summer Bank Holiday.

Registered Deaths in England from 2 January 2021
Week Ending	All Recorded Deaths	COVID-19 Deaths	5 Year Average	Total Excess Deaths	Week Ending	All Recorded Deaths	COVID-19 Deaths	5 Year Average	Total Excess Deaths
8 January	16,527	5,597	11,412	5,115	9 July	9,092	176	8,606	23,358
15 January	16,845	6,767	12,993	9,027	16 July	9,120	213	8,648	23,830
22 January	17,567	7,956	12,370	14,224	23 July	9,092	308	8,502	24,420
29 January	17,455	8,063	11,933	19,746	30 July	9,481	389	8,452	25,449
5 February	16,259	6,990	11,419	24,586	6 August	9,537	502	8,436	26,550
12 February	14,572	5,464	11,154	28,004	13 August	9,705	550	8,502	27,753
19 February	12,995	3,891	10,867	30,123	20 August	9,401	551	8,494	28,660
26 February	11,844	2,772	10,790	31,177	27 August	9,630	649	8,560	29,730
5 March	10,882	1,994	10,448	31,611	3 September	8,234	632	7,674	30,290
12 March	10,277	1,428	10,745	31,143	10 September	10,352	786	8,604	32,38
19 March	9,673	912	10,447	31,369	17 September	10,322	783	8,708	33,652
26 March	9,381	687	9,841	29.909	24 September	9,957	799	8,663	34,946
2 April	7,706	385	9,414	28,201	1 October	9,833	715	8,744	36,035
9 April	8,512	360	9,601	27,112	8 October	10,064	582	8,942	37,157
16 April	9,782	346	9,807	27,087	15 October	10,438	640	9,168	38,427
23 April	9,312	244	9,787	26.612	22 October	10,577	708	9,215	39,789
30 April	9,094	198	9,768	25,938	29 October	10,272	777	9,104	40,957
7 May	7,412	124	9,289	24,061	5 November	10,728	892	9,248	42,437
14 May	9,512	145	8,937	24,636	12 November	11,305	943	9,675	44,067
21 May	9,244	100	9,526	24,354	19 November	11,302	865	9,662	45,707
28 May	9,006	92	9,299	24,061	26 November	10,672	738	9,701	46,678
4 June	7,302	96	7,607	23,756	3 December	10,926	729	9,690	47,914
11 June	9,554	83	9,346	23,964	10 December	11,162	708	9,995	49,081
18 June	8,874	102	8,803	24,035	17 December	11,623	702	10,034	50,670
25 June	8,115	97	8,810	23,340	24 December	12,155	797	10,804	52,021
2 July	8,227	106	8,695	22,872	31 December	7,906	557	7,421	52,506

==== 2022 ====
The ONS 5 year average for 2022 includes data from 2016-2019 and 2021, as the number of deaths in 2021 was significantly above the previous 5 year average there will be a significant effect on the excess death data.

Registered Deaths in England from 1 January 2022
Week Ending	All Recorded Deaths	COVID-19 Deaths	5 Year Average	Total Excess Deaths	Week Ending	All Recorded Deaths	COVID-19 Deaths	5 Year Average	Total Excess Deaths
7 January	11,470	857	12,420	-950	8 July	??	??	??	??
14 January	12,339	1,308	13,270	-1,881	15 July	??	??	??	??
21 January	12,012	1,378	13,111	-2,980	22 July	??	??	??	??
28 January	11,653	1,323	12,815	-4.082	29 July	??	??	??	??
4 February	11,138	1,162	12,261	-5,205	5 August	??	??	??	??

=== Covid-19 deaths by place of occurrence ===
==== 13 March – 4 September 2020 ====
The ONS data includes information on deaths by place of occurrence. During the first wave of infections, the majority of deaths were in hospital (63%) but deaths in care homes was also high (30%). The percentage of deaths in each setting remained essentially constant from mid June to early September.

Deaths by Place of Occurrence
Week Ending	Home	Hospital	Hospice	Care Home	Other communal	Elsewhere	Total
13 March	–	5	–	–	-	–	5
20 March	1	97	–	2	–	–	100
27 March	14	480	2	18	–	1	515
3 April	111	2,985	29	187	3	15	3,330
10 April	309	4,727	51	768	17	27	5,899
17 April	398	5,831	103	1,929	34	40	8,335
24 April	402	4,564	107	2,669	40	24	7,806
1 May	236	3,043	84	2,329	36	20	5,748
8 May	148	1,859	75	1,590	22	22	3,716
15 May	141	1,800	57	1,592	25	9	3,624
22 May	101	1,238	58	1,046	6	6	2,455
29 May	65	942	27	670	6	5	1,715
5 June	74	841	26	536	9	2	1,488
12 June	47	622	20	360	5	3	1,057
19 June	49	431	20	242	–	2	744
26 June	28	356	7	181	–	2	574
3 July	33	282	14	163	2	3	497
10 July	34	210	7	89	1	3	344
17 July	28	157	6	91	1	1	284
24 July	24	109	6	67	2	1	209
31 July	14	120	4	44	–	1	183
7 August	11	85	3	29	–	–	128
14 August	10	71	4	39	–	1	125
21 August	13	67	4	39	1	2	126
28 August	9	63	1	23	–	1	97
4 September	6	48	2	17	1	–	74
Total	2,306	31,033	717	14,720	211	191	49,178
Percentage	4.7	63.1	1.5	29.9	0.4	0.4	100.0

==== 11 September 2020 – 1 January 2021 ====
During the second wave there was a significant increase in the percentage of deaths in hospital, and a corresponding decrease in care-home deaths.

Deaths by Place of Occurrence
Week Ending	Home	Hospital	Hospice	Care Home	Other communal	Elsewhere	Total
11 September	7	62	–	27	–	1	97
18 September	8	94	2	30	–	–	134
25 September	10	152	3	37	1	–	203
2 October	18	230	1	46	1	–	296
9 October	25	310	3	61	–	2	401
16 October	29	482	6	101	2	2	622
23 October	44	714	7	143	2	3	913
30 October	75	1,004	11	159	4	5	1,258
6 November	77	1415	16	257	5	1	1,771
13 November	114	1,737	28	389	1	5	2,274
20 November	136	1,877	35	409	8	6	2,471
27 November	179	2,068	38	511	12	12	2,820
4 December	115	1,960	36	500	7	5	2,623
11 December	112	1,879	35	488	7	9	2,530
18 December	138	1,975	38	564	10	4	2,729
25 December	112	1,978	36	492	8	5	2,631
1 January	139	2,112	45	518	10	7	2,831
Total	1,338	20,049	340	4,732	78	67	26,604
Percentage	5.0	75.4	1.3	17.8	0.3	0.3	100.0

==== 2 January 2021 – present ====
Deaths by Place of Occurrence 2021
Week Ending	Home	Hospital	Hospice	Care Home	Other communal	Elsewhere	Total
8 January	269	4,319	73	893	20	23	5,597
15 January	402	5,034	104	1,183	18	26	6,767
22 January	493	5,580	139	1,688	27	29	7,956
29 January	498	5,509	121	1,878	24	33	8,063
5 February	459	4,690	141	1,660	20	20	6,990
12 February	410	3,805	86	1,132	12	19	5,464
19 February	267	2,768	77	753	14	12	3,891
26 February	229	1,970	65	488	13	7	2,772
5 March	190	1,379	47	367	6	5	1,994
5 March	190	1,379	47	367	6	5	1,994
12 March	132	1,013	29	242	5	7	1,428
19 March	91	651	19	141	4	6	912
26 March	68	469	18	122	3	7	687
2 April	46	248	11	75	2	3	385
9 April	48	242	6	62	1	1	360
16 April	62	219	6	55	0	4	346
23 April	36	154	6	45	0	3	244
30 April	36	128	1	28	0	5	198
7 May	22	84	1	13	1	3	124
14 May	27	90	3	24	0	1	145
21 May	18	58	2	20	0	2	100
28 May	22	57	1	10	1	1	92
4 June	19	64	1	9	2	1	96
11 June	9	60	1	12	1	0	83
18 June	13	71	1	15	1	1	102
25 June	18	69	1	8	0	1	97
2 July	10	83	2	9	0	1	106
9 July	21	133	1	20	0	1	176
16 July	21	162	5	22	0	3	213
23 July	22	258	7	21	0	0	308
30 July	34	314	4	36	0	1	389
6 August	38	416	7	31	0	10	503
13 August	57	449	2	41	1	0	550
20 August	44	468	4	29	1	5	551
27 August	51	516	4	71	0	7	551
3 September	38	526	7	59	0	2	632
10 September	49	647	10	76	2	2	786
17 September	73	622	5	78	2	3	783
24 September	66	658	2	68	3	2	799
1 October	76	568	6	64	0	1	715
8 October	61	450	10	56	1	4	582
15 October	38	518	3	79	0	2	640
22 October	61	562	4	78	2	1	708
29 October	56	626	9	80	2	4	777
5 November	65	740	8	75	1	3	892
12 November	96	763	10	68	0	6	943
19 November	83	703	10	64	0	5	865
26 November	82	583	4	63	2	4	738
3 December	60	606	9	51	0	3	729
10 December	66	575	12	49	1	5	708
17 December	67	588	6	40	0	1	702
24 December	92	634	8	58	0	5	797
31 December	55	437	17	44	0	4	558
Total	5,556	53,716	1,183	12,720	199	311	73,685
Percentage	7.5	72.9	1.6	17.3	0.3	0.4	100.0

=== COVID-19 deaths by age ===
ONS Data are only available for England and Wales; the differences in the percentage of all deaths with age between the two waves of the pandemic were small. Almost three-quarters of the deaths occurred in those over 75 years (around 11% of the population) while those aged between 70 and 75 accounted for a further 9% of the deaths. Some differences were observed between the genders, with a generally higher percentage of deaths for men; the exception was those over 75, but this reflects the greater number of older women in the population.

Registered COVID-19 Deaths in England and Wales by Age Range
Age range (years)	2020 All (%)	2020 Male (%)	2020 Female (%)	2021 All (%)	2021 Male (%)	2021 Female (%)
0–39	0.5	0.6	0.5	1.1	1.2	1.0
40–44	0.5	0.5	0.4	0.8	1.0	0.7
45–49	0.9	1.0	0.7	1.4	1.6	1.2
50–54	1.6	1.8	1.3	2.5	2.8	2.1
55–59	2.7	3.2	2.1	3.9	4.5	3.1
60–64	4.0	4.8	3.1	5.6	6.5	4.4
65–69	5.7	6.7	4.4	7.1	8.1	6.0
70–74	9.4	11.0	7.6	10.1	11.4	8.7
75+	74.7	70.5	79.9	67.5	62.9	72.9

== Vaccination programme ==
A programme of mass vaccinations began on 8 December 2020, with priority given to the elderly, their carers and frontline health and social care workers.

Although there is a lag between catching the disease and mortality, the ONS data provided a way of identifying the effectiveness of the vaccination programme; only combined data for England and Wales are available. In December 2020, around 75% of deaths registered in England and Wales where COVID-19 was mentioned on the death certificate were in the 75+ age group, following the vaccination program by the end of March this had fallen to 63%. By the end of March 2021, around 50% of the population had received at least one dose of the vaccination and as a result the total number of registered deaths from COVID-19 had fallen from a maximum of more than 8,000/week to less than 700/week.

An alternative source that confirms the effectiveness of the vaccination program in England was the deaths in hospital data released daily by NHS. The caveat when considering this information is that around 30% of all deaths from Covid are not in hospitals and the majority of these deaths are people who are likely to be 80+ years old. In the period 1 January to 26 March 2021 there was a significant and continuous decrease in the weekly number of hospital deaths being recorded in the 80+ age group from 58.4% to 49.2%.

In June 2021 it was calculated that general practice had delivered 27.3 million out of 41.1 million covid-19 vaccinations in England at that point, with better response rates than the "mass" centres. This was considerably more than expected.

In February 2022, concerns have been presented about young children's access to Covid vaccines when it was claimed that they would not be included in school immunization programs in England. Following the Joint Committee for Vaccination and Immunisation's guidance, all children aged five to eleven in England will receive Covid vaccination (JCVI).

== Regulations and legislation ==
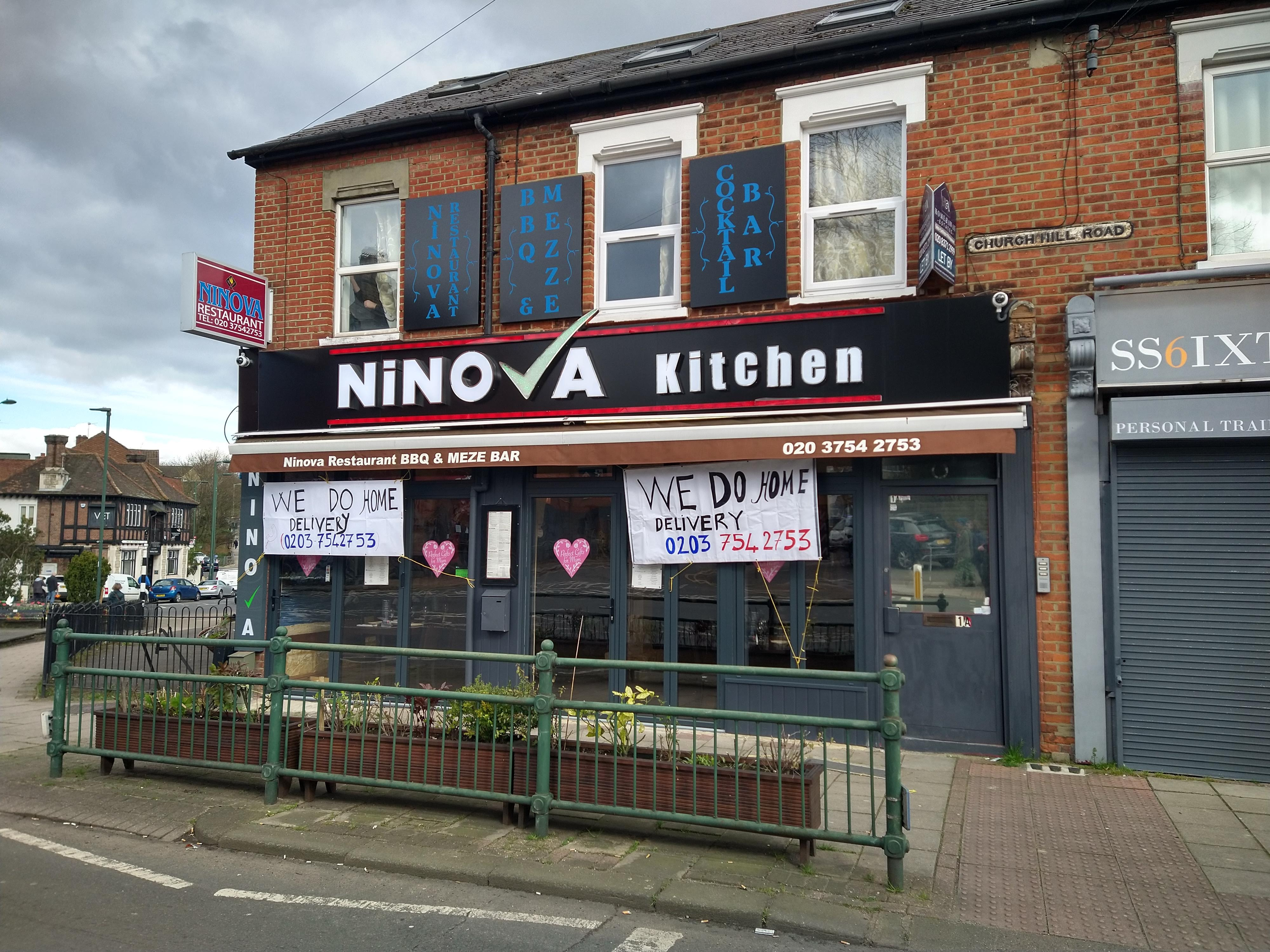
Restaurant in London offering home deliveries after dining-in was banned. March 2020.

The government published the Health Protection (Coronavirus) Regulations 2020 on 10 February 2020, a statutory instrument covering the legal framework behind the government's initial containment and isolation strategies and its organisation of the national reaction to the virus for England. Other published regulations include changes to Statutory Sick Pay (into force on 13 March), and changes to Employment and Support Allowance and Universal Credit (also 13 March).

On 19 March, the government introduced the Coronavirus Act 2020, which grants the government discretionary emergency powers in the areas of the NHS, social care, schools, police, the Border Force, local councils, funerals and courts. The act received royal assent on 25 March 2020. Closures to pubs, restaurants and indoor sports and leisure facilities were imposed via the Health Protection (Coronavirus, Business Closure) (England) Regulations 2020 (SI 2020/327).

On 23 March, the government announced a number of restrictions on movement, some of which were later enacted into law. These included:

1. Shopping for basic necessities, as infrequently as possible;
2. One form of exercise a day – for example a run, walk, or cycle – alone or with members of your household (was not enacted in law);
3. Any medical need, to provide care or to help a vulnerable person;
4. Travelling to and from work, but only where this is absolutely necessary and cannot be done from home.

The full regulations are detailed in:

- The Health Protection (Coronavirus, Restrictions) (England) Regulations 2020
  - amended on 22 April by the Health Protection (Coronavirus, Restrictions) (England) (Amendment) Regulations 2020
    - and further amended on 13 May by the Health Protection (Coronavirus, Restrictions) (England) (Amendment) (No. 2) Regulations 2020

=== Local lockdown regulations ===
In England, up until 14 October 2020 most of the COVID-19 lockdown regulations covered the whole country, but some local areas of particular concern are or have been subject to more restrictive rules at various times, namely Leicester, Luton, Blackburn with Darwen, Bradford, Tameside, Bury, Manchester, Oldham, Rochdale, Salford, Stockport, Trafford, Wigan, Pendle, Hyndburn, Burnley, Calderdale and Kirklees. In most cases, the effect of the local regulations had been to slow down the gradual easing of the lockdown regulations which applied to the rest of the country.

=== Tier regulations ===
In England the local lockdown regulations were swept away on 14 October 2020, and were replaced by the first COVID-19 tier regulations in England. The restrictions were enforced by three statutory instruments, as follows:

- "Tier 1": The Health Protection (Coronavirus, Local COVID-19 Alert Level) (Medium) (England) Regulations 2020 (SI 2020/1103)
- "Tier 2": The Health Protection (Coronavirus, Local COVID-19 Alert Level) (High) (England) Regulations 2020 (SI 2020/1104)
- "Tier 3": The Health Protection (Coronavirus, Local COVID-19 Alert Level) (Very High) (England) Regulations 2020 (SI 2020/1105)

These are referred to as the 'first tier regulations". The regulations relate to England only.

Following the November lockdown, a new framework of tiers, known as the second tier regulations, were introduced in the Health Protection (Coronavirus, Restrictions) (All Tiers) (England) Regulations 2020. The regulations apply from 2 December 2020 until 2 February 2021, with special arrangements over the Christmas period, 23–27 December 2020.

In December 2020, a new Fourth Tier was added to the second tier regulations. Households in this tier were subjected to further restrictions including a restrictions on movement, a ban on international travel and a ban on meeting more than one person outside. The Christmas regulations were changed, so that only households in Tiers 1–3 could mix with up to three other households only on Christmas Day only; Tier 4 households could not mix over the festive period.

Tiers by local government district for each period of being in force
14 October - 5 November 2020

2-15 December 2020

16-18 December 2020

19 December 2020

20-25 December 2020

26-30 December 2020

31 December 2020 - 5 January 2021

5 January 2021 - 29 March 2021
Tier 1 Tier 2 Tier 3 Tier 4

=== Travel restrictions ===
On 7 May, the government released a list of countries with quarantine rules when returning to England.

	Before entering England	On arrival into England	Countries
Red	Complete a passenger locator form; Take a COVID-19 test; Book a quarantine hotel package, including 2 COVID-19 tests	Quarantine in a managed hotel, including 2 COVID-19 tests	Angola, Argentina, Bangladesh, Bolivia, Botswana, Brazil, Burundi, Cape Verde, Chile, Colombia, Congo (Democratic Republic), Ecuador, Eswatini, Ethiopia, French Guiana, Guyana, India, Kenya, Lesotho, Malawi, Maldives, Mozambique, Namibia, Nepal, Oman, Pakistan, Panama, Paraguay, Peru, Philippines, Qatar, Rwanda, Seychelles, Somalia, South Africa, Suriname, Tanzania, Turkey, United Arab Emirates (UAE), Uruguay, Venezuela, Zambia and Zimbabwe.
Amber	Complete a passenger locator form; Take a COVID-19 test; Book and pay for day 2 and day 8 COVID-19 travel tests – to be taken after arrival in England	Quarantine at home or in the place you are staying for 10 days; Take a COVID-19 test on or before day 2 and on or after day 8	Afghanistan, Akrotiri and Dhekelia, Albania, Algeria, Andorra, Anguilla, Antigua and Barbuda, Armenia, Aruba, Austria, Azerbaijan, The Bahamas, Bahrain, Barbados, Belarus, Belgium, Belize, Benin, Bermuda, Bhutan, Bonaire, Sint Eustatius and Saba, Bosnia and Herzegovina, British Antarctic Territory, British Indian Ocean Territory, British Virgin Islands, Bulgaria, Burkina Faso, Cambodia, Cameroon, Canada, Cayman Islands, Central African Republic, Chad, China, Comoros, Congo, Cook Islands, Costa Rica, Côte d'Ivoire, Croatia, Cuba, Curaçao, Cyprus, Czech Republic (Czechia), Denmark, Djibouti, Dominica, Dominican Republic, Egypt, El Salvador, Equatorial Guinea, Eritrea, Estonia, Fiji, Finland, France, French Polynesia, Gabon, The Gambia, Georgia, Germany, Ghana, Greece (including islands), Greenland, Grenada, Guadeloupe, Guatemala, Guinea, Guinea-Bissau, Haiti, Honduras, Hong Kong, Hungary, Indonesia, Iran, Iraq, Italy, Jamaica, Japan, Jordan, Kazakhstan, Kiribati, Kosovo, Kuwait, Kyrgyzstan, Laos, Latvia, Lebanon, Liberia, Libya, Liechtenstein, Lithuania, Luxembourg, Macao, Madagascar, Malaysia, Mali, Malta, Marshall Islands, Martinique, Mauritania, Mauritius, Mayotte, Mexico, Micronesia, Moldova, Monaco, Mongolia, Montenegro, Montserrat, Morocco, Myanmar (Burma), Nauru, Netherlands, New Caledonia, Nicaragua, Niger, Nigeria, North Korea, North Macedonia, Norway, The Palestinian Territories, Palau, Papua New Guinea, Pitcairn, Henderson, Ducie and Oeno Islands, Poland, Réunion, Romania, Russia, Samoa, San Marino, São Tomé and Príncipe, Saudi Arabia, Senegal, Serbia, Sierra Leone, Slovakia, Slovenia, Solomon Islands, South Korea, South Sudan, Spain (including the Balearics and Canary Islands), Sri Lanka, St Kitts and Nevis, St Lucia, St Martin and St Barthélemy, St Vincent and the Grenadines, Sudan, Sweden, Switzerland, Syria, Taiwan, Tajikistan, Thailand, Timor-Leste, Togo, Tonga, Trinidad and Tobago, Tunisia, Turkmenistan, Turks and Caicos Islands, Tuvalu, Uganda, Ukraine, United States (USA), Uzbekistan, Vanuatu, Vietnam, Wallis and Futuna, Western Sahara and Yemen.
Green	Complete a passenger locator form; Take a COVID-19 test; Book and pay for a day 2 COVID-19 test	You must take a COVID-19 test on or before day 2 after you arrive; You do not need to quarantine unless the test result is positive; You must self-isolate if NHS Test & Trace informs you that you travelled to England with someone who has tested positive for COVID-19.	Australia, Brunei, Falkland Islands, Faroe Islands, Gibraltar, Iceland, Israel, New Zealand, Portugal (including the Azores and Madeira), Singapore, South Georgia and South Sandwich Islands and St Helena, Ascension and Tristan da Cunha.

== Impact ==
=== Finance and the economy ===
During the second half of March, one million British workers applied for the Universal Credit benefit scheme. On 20 March the government announced a COVID-19 Job Retention Scheme, which offered grants to companies to pay 80% of an employee's wage each month up to a total of £2,500 per person, if companies kept staff on their payroll. The scheme would cover three months' wages and would be backdated to the start of March. Following a three-week extension of the countrywide lockdown the scheme was extended until the end of June 2020. Initially, the scheme was only for those workers who started work at their company on or before 28 February 2020; this was later changed to 19 March 2020, the day before the scheme was announced, allowing 200,000 additional workers to be part of it.

On the first day of operation 140,000 companies used the scheme. Later, the scheme was extended to the end of October, with the Chancellor saying that from August companies would have to contribute towards the 80% of employees' wages that the government was covering. It was stated that the scheme was costing £14 billion a month to run, with nearly a quarter of all workers in Britain furloughed by their employers within two weeks of the start of the scheme. The decision to extend the job retention scheme was made to avoid mass redundancies, company bankruptcies, and potentially unemployment levels not seen since the 1930s.

In March the Self Employed Income Support Scheme (SEISS) was announced. The scheme paid a grant worth 80% of self-employed profits up to £2,500 each month, for companies whose trading profit was less than £50,000 in the 2018–19 financial year or averaged less than £50,000 over the last three tax years. HM Revenue & Customs were tasked with contacting those who were eligible, and the grant was taxable. The government also announced a six-month delay to tax payments. Self-employed people who paid themselves a salary and dividends were not covered by the scheme and instead had to apply for the job retention scheme. The scheme went live on 13 May. ahead of schedule, and people were invited to claim on a specific date between 13 and 18 May based on their Unique Tax Reference number. By 15 May, more than 1 million self-employed people had applied to the scheme.

Some small business owners and self-employed people did not receive financial support from the government. This led to the formation in May 2020 of a campaigning group called ExcludedUK; in 2025 the BBC reported that the group represented 3.8 million UK taxpayers.

The government announced a Retail, Hospitality and Leisure Grant Fund (RHLGF) and changes to the Small Business Grant Fund (SBGF) on 17 March. The SBGF was changed from £3,000 to £10,000, while the RHLGF offered grants of up to £25,000. £12.33 billion in funding was committed to the SBGF and the RHLGF schemes with another £617 million added at the start of May. By 25 April only around 50% of eligible business had received funding.

On 23 March, the Government announced the COVID-19 Business Interruption Loan Scheme (CBILS) for small and medium-sized businesses, and the Covid Corporate Financing Facility for large companies. The government banned banks from seeking personal guarantees on COVID-19 Business Interruption loans under £250,000, following complaints. A COVID-19 Large Business Interruption Loan Scheme (CLBILS) was announced on 3 April and later adjusted to include more companies. In May, the maximum a company could borrow under the scheme was raised from £50 million to £200 million. Restrictions were put in place on companies in the scheme, including on dividends paid and on bonuses to members of the board. On 20 April the Government announced a scheme worth £1.25 billion to support innovative new companies that could not claim for COVID-19 rescue schemes. The government additionally announced the Bounce Back Loan Scheme (BBLS) for small and medium size businesses. The scheme offered loans of up to £50,000 and was interest-free for the first year before an interest rate of 2.5% a year was applied, with the loan to be paid back within six years. Businesses who had a CBILS loan of up to £50,000 could transfer to this scheme, but had to do so by 4 November 2020. The scheme launched on 4 May. The loan was 100% guaranteed by the government and was designed to be simpler than the CBILS scheme. More than 130,000 BBLS applications were received by banks on the first day of operation, with more than 69,500 being approved. On 13 May the Government announced that it was underwriting Trade credit insurance, to prevent businesses struggling in the pandemic from having no insurance cover. By 12 May almost £15 billion of state aid had been given to businesses. The Treasury and the Bank of England announced the Covid Corporate Financing Facility (CCFF) on 17 March.

The Resolution Foundation surveyed 6,000 workers, and concluded that 30% of those in the lowest income bracket had been affected by the pandemic compared with 10% of those in the top fifth of earners. The foundation said that about a quarter of 18 to 24-year-olds included in the research had been furloughed whilst another 9% had lost their job altogether. They also said that 35 to 44-year-olds were least likely to be furloughed or lose their jobs with only around 15% of the surveyed population having experienced these outcomes. Earlier research by the Institute for Fiscal Studies concluded that young people (those under 25) and women were more likely to be working in a shut-down business sector.

The Guardian reported that after the government had suspended the standard tender process so contracts could to be issued "with extreme urgency", over a billion pounds of state contracts had been awarded under the new fast-track rules. The contracts were to provide food parcels, personal protective equipment (PPE) and assist in operations. The largest contract was given to Edenred by the Department for Education: it was worth £234 million and was for the replacement of free school meals.

=== National health service response ===
==== Appointments and self-isolation ====
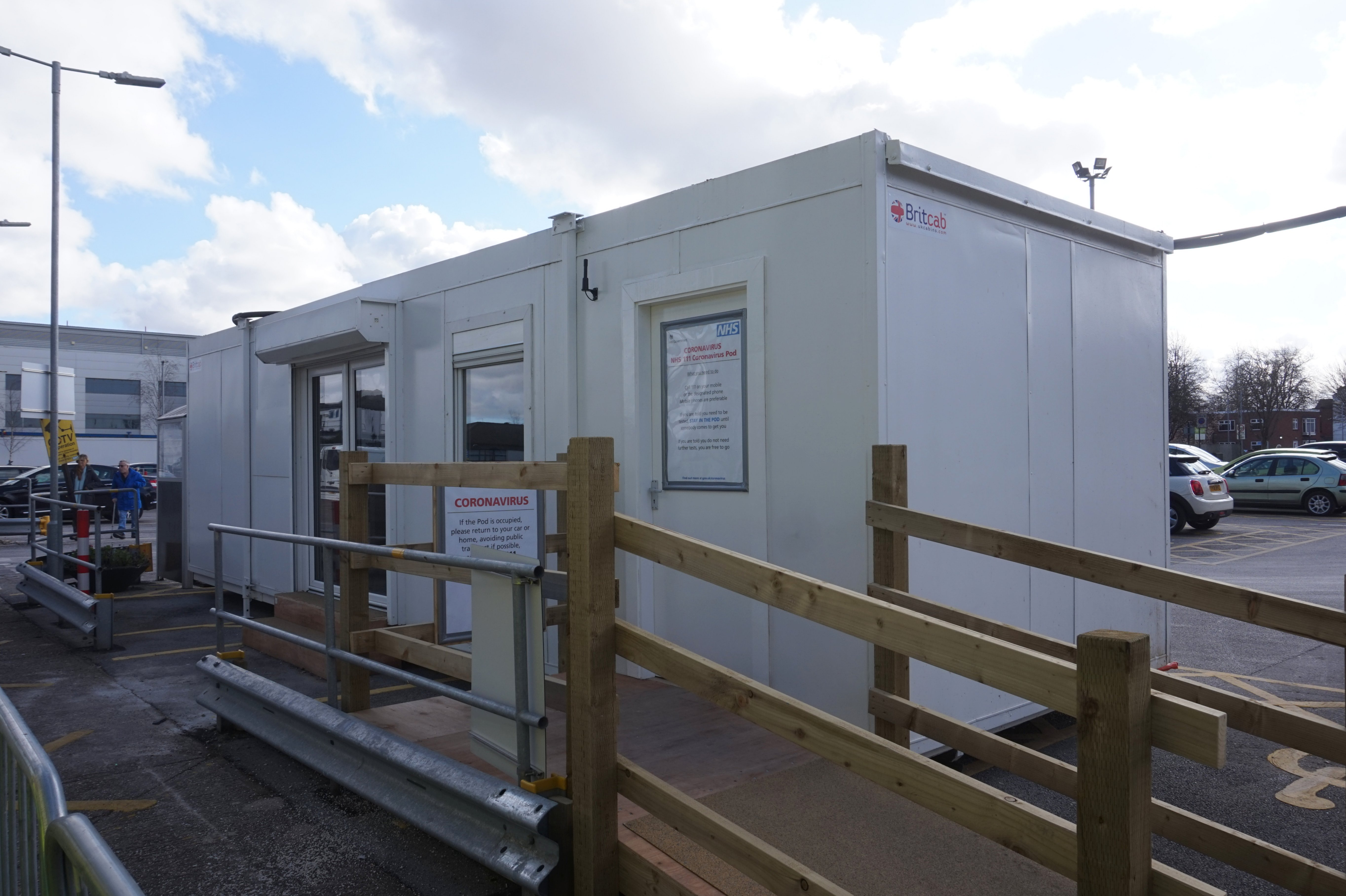
A COVID-19 'pod' at Hull Royal Infirmary

In March, hospitals in England began to cancel all elective procedures. On 22 March, the government announced that it would be asking about 1.5 million people (everyone in England with certain health conditions that carry serious risk if infected) to "shield" for 12 weeks. They were to be notified by mail or text messaged by their NHS general practitioners, and provided deliveries of medication, food, and household essentials, delivered by pharmacists and local governments, and at least initially paid for by the UK government. Members of the public were told to stay at home, should they suspect they have symptoms of COVID-19, and not visit a GP, pharmacy, or hospital. For advice, the public were told to use a dedicated online self-assessment form before calling NHS 111, the non-emergency medical helpline.

To allow vulnerable patients with underlying conditions to still be able to attend for routine blood tests without having to come to a hospital, from 8 April, the Sheffield Teaching Hospitals NHS Foundation Trust opened a drive-through phlebotomy service operating out of a tent in the car park of Sheffield Arena. This allows patients to have their blood tests taken from within their car, in a similar manner to how COVID-19 swabbing drive-through stations work. Following the success of the service, it was expanded to cover all patients registered with any GP in the Sheffield area from 27 April.

==== Beds ====
NHS England freed up 30,000 beds by discharging patients who were well enough and by delaying non-emergency treatment, and acquired use of 8,000 beds in private sector facilities. Emergency building work was undertaken to add capacity to existing hospitals, 52 beds in Wigan, for example. An additional capacity of almost 20,000 beds was created with NHS Nightingale Hospitals in major conurbations across the United Kingdom. Only a small amount of the capacity was used, and most of the hospitals were put on standby as the situation progressed.

On 18 October 2020, The Guardian reported that according to the National Health Service (NHS) report, the Greater Manchester is at risk of running out of hospital beds during the pandemic. NHS data revealed that before Friday 211 of the 257 critical care beds were occupied in Greater Manchester, and 82% of the total supply was in use by Covid-positive people or people admitted for other critical cases.

==== Communication ====
NHS England's approach to communications during the pandemic was described as "truly dreadful" by Sir Richard Leese, chair of Greater Manchester Health and Social Care Partnership in May 2021. He said their tight control of public communications had made getting crucial messages to the public a "nightmare". "We took the view that having a fully informed public might have helped us tackle covid, but that's not the view we got from NHSE. People's willingness to comply with guidelines around covid was beginning to weaken and we wanted to get a message out [that] our hospitals were on the edge of falling over. We wanted to have responsible media to be able to go into hospitals and tell that story, but it took us ages to get consent to do that." Although this criticism was rejected by NHS England medical director Steve Powis dozens of local NHS leaders and communications staff privately agreed.

Birth sex ratio changes

Population stress is thought to have contributed to a sharp drop in the sex ratio at birth in England and Wales to 51.00% in June 2020, three months after COVID-19 was declared a pandemic. In December 2020, nine months after the pandemic was declared, the sex ratio at birth dramatically increased to 51.71%, most likely as a result of lockdown measures that initially encouraged more coupled sexual activity in a portion of the population.

=== Law and order ===
In March, police forces in each nation of the UK were given powers to arrest and issue fixed penalty notices (FPNs) to citizens who broke lockdown rules. The National Police Chiefs' Council said police had issued their first FPNs for people breaking lockdown rules on 27 March. The penalty amounts were £60, reduced to £30 if paid within 14 days. By 31 March, some police forces and individual officers were being criticised by a variety of people including former Supreme Court judge Lord Sumption, former Justice secretary David Gauke, former Chancellor George Osborne and privacy and civil liberties group Big Brother Watch for over-zealous and incorrect application of the new powers. New guidance was released by the National Police Chiefs Council.

According to the National Police Chiefs' Council, around 9,000 people were issued FPNs for breaking lockdown rules in England and Wales between 27 March and 27 April. From 13 May, amendments to the regulations increased the initial penalty to £100.

In May 2020, the Crown Prosecution Service stated 56 people were wrongly charged with offences related to the pandemic. This was mainly due to Welsh regulations being applied in England and vice versa. Some fixed penalty notices issued for breaking lockdown laws were wrongly issued. Of those where an individual declined to pay and were prosecuted in open court, 25% were found to be wrongly issued. Giving evidence to parliament, barrister Kirsty Brimelow said it was likely that thousands of FPNs had been incorrectly issued.

There were reports of hate incidents against Italian and Chinese persons, and a Singaporean student was assaulted in London in an attack that police linked to COVID-19 fears. In addition there were reports of young people deliberately coughing and spitting in the faces of others, including an incident involving health workers.

On 9 May, police broke up an anti-lockdown protest in London consisting of around 40 people. It was thought to be the first such protest in the UK, following protests in other nations. It was reported that around 60 protests had been planned on the weekend of 16 May, with police saying that they were preparing to break them up. Protests took place in London and Southampton, with several protesters arrested and fined at the London demonstration.

In October, police broke up a wedding with 100 guests at the Tudor Rose, Southall, breaking social isolation laws. A police spokesman said the owner could be fined £10,000.

==== Fraud ====
Local councils found fake goods being sold including testing kits, face masks and hand sanitiser. There had also been reports of scams involving the replacement school meals scheme and incidents of people posing as government officials, council staff or IT workers.

During the contact tracing app trial on the Isle of Wight the Chartered Trading Standards Institute found evidence of a phishing scam. In the scam recipients would receive a text stating that they had been in contact with someone with COVID-19 and were directed to a website to input their personal details.

==== Courts and prisons ====
On 17 March, trials lasting longer than three days were postponed until May in England and Wales, Those cases already running would continue in the hope of reaching a conclusion.

The government released specific guidance to prisons in the event of COVID-19 symptoms or cases, specifically the rule that "any prisoner or detainee with a new, continuous cough or a high temperature should be placed in protective isolation for 7 days". There are around 83,000 prisoners in England and Wales. On 24 March, the Ministry of Justice announced that prison visits would be suspended and that inmates would be confined to their cells. In order to maintain communication between prisoners and their families, the government promised 900 secure phones to 55 prisons, with calls being monitored and time-limited. In a committee meeting on the same day, Justice Secretary Robert Buckland suggested that 50 pregnant inmates might be given early release, and another 9,000 inmates awaiting trial could be transferred to bail hostels. On 14 April, the Ministry of Justice ordered 500 modular buildings, reportedly adapted from shipping containers, to provide additional single prison cell accommodation at seven prisons: HMPs North Sea Camp, Littlehey, Hollesley Bay, Highpoint, Moorland, Lindholme and Humber. Following a COVID-19 case in HMP Manchester, public services think tank Reform called for the release of 2,305 "low-risk" offenders on short sentences to reduce the risk of COVID-19 on the prison population. Former justice secretary David Gauke echoed similar sentiments, citing the "churn" of prisoners going in and out of prison as a risk. Up to 4,000 prisoners in England and Wales are to be released. Amnesty International's Europe Deputy Director of Research said that authorities in UK should consider releasing those who are more vulnerable to COVID-19.

On 18 March, the first COVID-19 case was reported within the UK prison population. The prisoner, who had been serving time in HMP Manchester (commonly referred to as Strangeways), was moved to a hospital. While no other prisoners or staff tested positive for the virus, thirteen prisoners and four members of staff were put into isolation as a precaution. On 26 March, it was reported that an 84-year-old sex offender had died from COVID-19 on 22 March at HMP Littlehey in Cambridgeshire, becoming the first inmate in the UK to die from the virus. On 28 April, Public Health England had identified around 2,000 "possible/probable" and confirmed COVID-19 cases; outbreaks had occurred in 75 different institutions, with 35 inmates treated in hospital and 15 deaths.

=== Aviation ===
From the latter half of January, Heathrow Airport received additional clinical support and tightened surveillance of the three direct flights it receives from Wuhan every week; each were to be met by a Port Health team. Later, airlines including British Airways and Ryanair announced a number of flight cancellations for March.

On 25 March, London City Airport announced it would temporarily close due to the COVID-19 outbreak. Heathrow Airport closed one runway from 6 April, while Gatwick Airport closed one of its two terminals, and said its runway would open for scheduled flights only between 2:00 pm and 10:00 pm.

=== Public transport ===
On 20 March, Southeastern became the first train operating company to announce a reduced timetable, which would come into use from 23 March.

On 19 March, the Stagecoach Supertram light rail network in Sheffield announced that they would be switching to a modified Sunday service from 23 March until further notice. Local bus operators First South Yorkshire and Stagecoach Yorkshire, which operate across the same area, announced that they would also be switching to a reduced timetable from 23 March. National Express suspended all its long-distance coach services from 6 April.

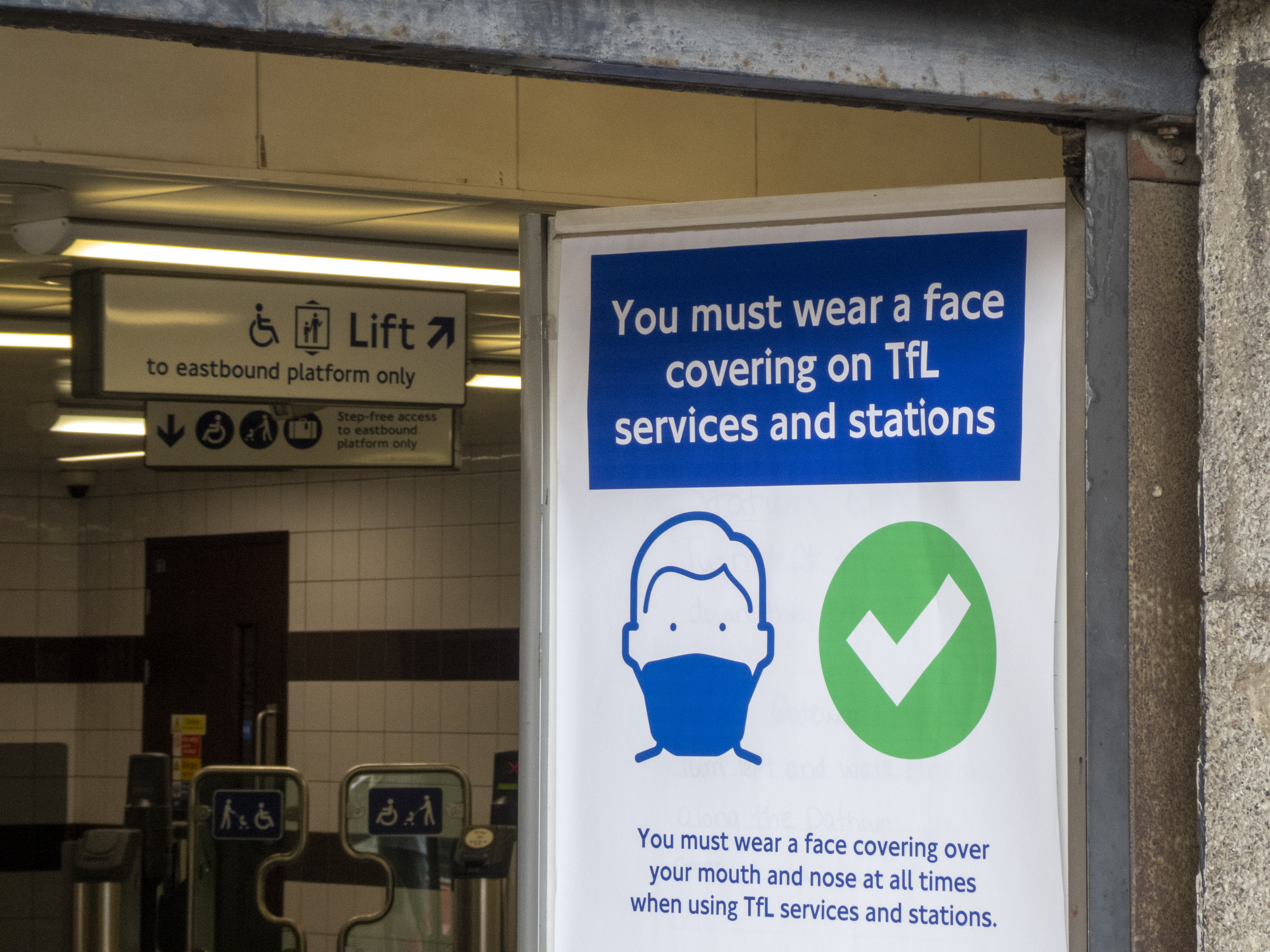
A sign stating that a face covering must be worn on TfL services at Tower Hill tube station in August 2021.

Transport for London (TfL) services were reduced in stages. All Night Overground and Night Tube services, as well as all services on the Waterloo & City line, were suspended from 20 March, and 40 tube stations were closed on the same day. The Mayor of London and TfL urged people to use public transport only if absolutely essential, so it could be used by critical workers.

In April, TfL trialled changes encouraging passengers to board London buses by the middle or rear doors to lessen the risks to drivers, after the deaths of 14 TfL workers including nine drivers. This measure was extended to all routes on 20 April, and passengers were no longer required to pay, so they did not need to use the card reader near the driver.

On 22 April, London mayor Sadiq Khan warned that TfL could run out of money to pay staff by the end of April unless the government stepped in. Since London entered lockdown on 23 March, Tube journeys had fallen by 95% and bus journeys by 85%. On 7 May, it was reported that TfL had requested £2 billion in state aid to keep services running until September 2020. on 12 May, TfL documents warned it expected to lose £4bn due to the pandemic and said it needed £3.2bn to balance a proposed emergency budget for 2021, having lost 90% of its overall income. Without an agreement with the government, deputy mayor for transport Heidi Alexander said TfL might have to issue a 'section 114 notice' – the equivalent of a public body becoming bankrupt. On 14 May, the UK Government agreed £1.6bn in emergency funding to keep Tube and bus services running until September.

In April, Govia Thameslink Railway re-branded three trains with special liveries to show its support for the NHS and the 200,000 essential workers commuting on GTR's network every week.

=== British Armed Forces ===
The COVID-19 pandemic affected British military deployments at home and abroad. Training exercises, including those in Canada and Kenya, had to be cancelled to free up personnel for the COVID Support Force. The British training mission in Iraq, part of Operation Shader, had to be down-scaled. An air base supporting this military operation also confirmed nine cases of COVID-19. The British Army paused face-to-face recruitment and basic training operations, instead conducting them virtually. Training locations, such as Royal Military Academy Sandhurst and HMS Raleigh, had to adapt their passing out parades. Cadets involved were made to stand 2 metres (6 ft 7 in) apart in combat dress and there were no spectators in the grandstands. Ceremonial duties, such as the Changing of the Guard at Buckingham Palace and the Gun Salute for the Queen's Official Birthday were either scaled-down or cancelled. The Royal Air Force suspended all displays of its teams and bands, with some replaced by virtual displays. The British Army deployed two experts to NATO to help counter disinformation around the pandemic.

Elsewhere in defence, air shows, including the Royal International Air Tattoo at RAF Fairford, were cancelled. Civilian airports, including Birmingham Airport, were used to practice transferring COVID-19 patients to local hospitals via helicopter. Several defence and aerospace companies contributed to the national effort to produce more ventilators. BAE Systems, the country's largest defence company, also loaned its Warton Aerodrome site to be used as a temporary morgue. The Government's defence and security review, named the Integrated Review, was delayed.

The armed forces assisted in the transportation of COVID-19 patients in some of the country's remotest regions, such as Shetland and the Isles of Scilly. On 23 March 2020, Joint Helicopter Command began assisting the COVID-19 relief effort by transporting people and supplies. Helicopters were based at RAF Leeming to cover Northern England and Scotland, whilst helicopters based at RAF Benson, RAF Odiham and RNAS Yeovilton supported the Midlands and Southern England.

On 24 March 2020, the armed forces helped plan and construct a field hospital at the ExCeL London conference centre, named NHS Nightingale Hospital London. Further critical care field hospitals were later built with military assistance in Birmingham, Manchester, Harrogate, Bristol, Exeter, Washington and Glasgow. These hospitals were staffed by military medics, alongside the NHS.

== See also ==
- COVID-19 pandemic in the United Kingdom
- COVID-19 pandemic in Northern Ireland
- COVID-19 pandemic in Scotland
- COVID-19 pandemic in Wales
- COVID-19 pandemic in London
- COVID-19 vaccination programme in the United Kingdom
