= Moreland (surname) =

Moreland is a surname. Notable people with the surname include:

- Barry Moreland (born 1943), Australian dancer and choreographer
- Bruce Moreland (born 1959), American musician
- Charles Moreland, American politician
- Earthwind Moreland (born 1977), American football player
- Eric Moreland (born 1991), American basketball player
- Geoffrey Moreland (1914–1996), English footballer
- Jackie Moreland (1938–1971), American basketball player
- Jake Moreland (born 1977), American football player
- Jarien Moreland (born 1988), American football player
- Jimmy Moreland (born 1996), American football player
- John Moreland (disambiguation), multiple people
- J. P. Moreland (born 1948), American philosopher
- Julius C. Moreland (1844–1918), American lawyer and judge
- Keith Moreland (born 1954), American baseball player
- Lesley Moreland, English author whose daughter was murdered in 1990
- Mantan Moreland (1902–1973), American actor
- Marc Moreland (1958–2002), American musician
- Mary L. Moreland (1859–1918), American minister
- Michael Moreland (born 1962), American lawyer and politician
- Milton C. Moreland, American academic administrator
- Mitch Moreland (born 1985), American baseball player
- Nate Moreland (1914–1973), American baseball player
- Neil Moreland, Scottish footballer
- Peggy Moreland, American writer
- Prentice Moreland (1925–1988), American singer
- Robert Moreland (born 1941), British politician
- Robert Moreland (basketball) (born 1938), American basketball coach
- Russell Moreland (1901–1986), Scottish footballer and manager
- Sherman Moreland (1868–1951), American politician
- Tim Moreland, American sportscaster
- Tom Moreland, American engineer
- Victor Moreland (born 1957), Northern Irish footballer
- Whitt L. Moreland (1930–1951), American marine
- William Moreland (disambiguation), multiple people

== Fictional characters ==
- Bunk Moreland, a character in the television series The Wire
