= HM Prison Lindholme =

Prison in South Yorkshire, England

Coordinates: 53.54°N 0.97°W

HMP Lindholme
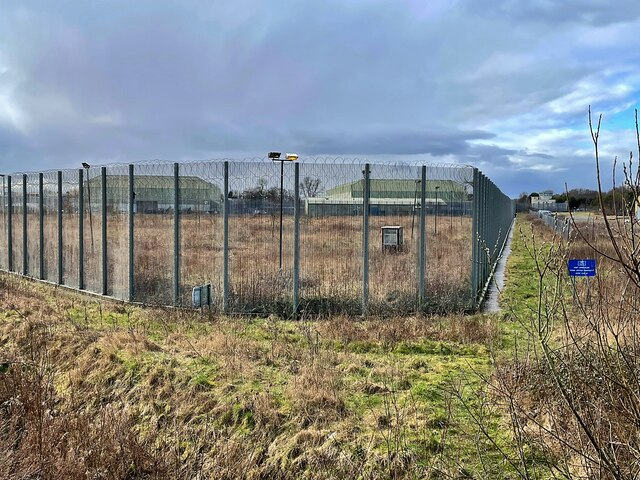
- Boundary fence at HMP Lindholme
- Interactive map of HMP Lindholme
- Location: Hatfield Woodhouse, South Yorkshire
- Security class: Adult Male/Category C
- Population: 1,005 (Oct 2013)
- Opened: 1985
- Managed by: HM Prison Services
- Governor: Shaun Mycroft
- Website: Lindholme at justice.gov.uk

Lindholme (HM Prison) shown within South Yorkshire (grid reference SE682062)

HM Prison Lindholme is a Category C/D men's prison located near Hatfield Woodhouse in the Metropolitan Borough of Doncaster, South Yorkshire, England. Lindholme is operated by His Majesty's Prison Service, and is situated in close proximity to Hatfield and Moorland prisons

== History ==
The site was originally constructed as RAF Lindholme during the Second World War to house and operate bombers. During the RAF station's lifetime it was home to the RAF Bomber Command Bombing School (BCBS) and also the RAF Navigation School. BCBS moved out in 1972, and RAF Lindholme became a radar installation with its hangars converted for storage, eventually being downgraded to a relief glider landing field and closing altogether shortly thereafter. The site, which occupies 128 acres (52 ha), re-opened as a prison in 1985. Many of the original buildings and hangars from the RAF station are still in use as prison accommodation, offices and workshops, although these have been augmented by new buildings. In 2000, the old RAF Officers' Mess building, which had been used as a Category D prison wing, was converted into an Immigration Removal Centre.

The annual budget for running Lindholme was £18.3 million in 2011–12, and the cost per prisoner for 2010 was £32,757. This budget does not include the costs of providing educational facilities or healthcare, which are separately funded.

On 14 July 2011, it was announced that the operation of HMP Lindholme would be put out to tender, accepting bids from private companies and HM Prison Service for the management of the establishment. Serco were about to be awarded the contract, but the decision was postponed in July 2013, to allow allegations that they had been overcharging and mismanaging other contracts within the public sector to be investigated. In November 2013 it was announced that HMP Lindholme along with the two other contested sites in South Yorkshire, HMP Hatfield and HMP Moorland, would remain in the public sector, ending two years of uncertainty.

In April 2012, the Immigration Removal Centre was closed and converted back to a Category D prison wing. In June 2013 an inspection report from Her Majesty's Chief Inspector of Prisons was strongly critical of the Category D wing, and it was subsequently closed. The report also stated that there were religious tensions at the prison, illegal drugs and alcohol were widely available, and that the needs of disabled inmates were neglected. However, the report concluded that much of the training for prisoners was of good quality, and that vocational courses in construction and baking were "outstanding".

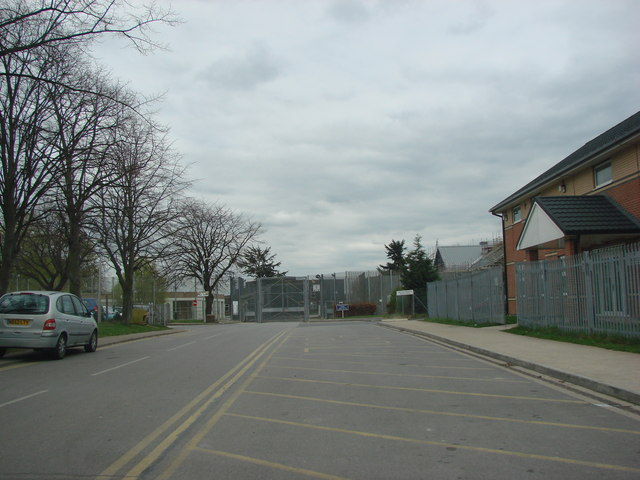
Entrance to HMP Lindholme in 2007

== Lindholme today ==
Lindholme holds Category C male prisoners only. This category is for people who are unlikely to make a serious attempt to escape from prison, but who could not be trusted in an open prison. The prison holds Category C convicted males over the age of 21, who are serving a minimum sentence of four years, and used to hold a small number of Category D males, who were awaiting allocation to an open prison. However, the D wing was closed in 2013 because of poor care and medical issues.

The prison has an Operational Capacity of 1,010 inmates, and this number is also the Certified National Accommodation rating for the prison, which is the uncrowded capacity that provides a decent standard of accommodation for all prisoners. The prison is run by the public sector prison service, but educational services are provided by the City of Manchester College for Learning and Skills, and healthcare is provided by Nottingham NHS Trust.

The Category C site consists of eleven wings, six of which were dormitories when the site was owned by the RAF, but which also provide some single rooms and some multi-occupancy rooms. Three wings are relatively new additions to the prison and are single cell occupancy. A further new wing opened in November 2007 with double cells, which is used to hold prisoners who are at risk from bullying and intimidation. The Induction Unit has double cells, and a purpose built Care and Separation Unit was built in 2008. Every year from 2009 to 2012, the state of the kitchens had been criticised in the Independent Monitoring Board annual report. Construction of a new kitchen costing £7 million was completed in April 2013, but the power supply to it was inadequate, and it was closed until 23 November, while this was rectified, at extra cost. This oversight led the Independent Monitoring Board to question how such contracts are awarded, and whether the prison service gets value for money. The 2014 report also commended the dedication of the catering staff, for their production of good quality food and their accommodation of dietary needs during religious festivals.

The prison education department offers inmates opportunities to study for qualifications such as NVQs, GCSEs and A Levels in subjects including English, mathematics, English for Speakers of Other Languages (ESOL), information technology, business administration, graphic design, reprographics and printing, visual art, catering, baking, hospitality, hairdressing and barbering, industrial cleaning, construction industry training in trowel trades, plastering, painting and decorating, carpentry, plumbing, civil engineering, fork lift training, light engineering, railway engineering, horticulture, waste management, textiles, and a range of PE courses.
