= Moorland (disambiguation) =

Moorland is a type of habitat found in upland areas.

Moorland may also refer to:

== Places ==
=== Australia ===
- Moorland, Queensland, a locality in the Bundaberg Region

=== United Kingdom ===
- Carlton-le-Moorland
- Moorland, Somerset

=== United States ===
- Moorland, Iowa
- Moorland, Kentucky
- Moorland Township, Michigan

== Other ==
- Moorland (HM Prison), Category C prison located Hatfield Woodhouse, South Yorkshire, England (renamed from Moorland Closed (HM Prison) in 2010)
- Moorland Open (HM Prison), Category D prison located Hatfield Woodhouse, South Yorkshire, England (renamed Hatfield Prison in 2010)
- Moorland-Spingarn Research Center, repository at Howard University in Washington, D.C., United States, for the documentation of the history and culture of people of African descent in Africa
- Daydream – Moorland, soundtrack album by the German electronic music group Tangerine Dream, for the TV series Tatort
- Jesse E. Moorland, Black minister, community executive, and civic leader from Ohio, United States
- The Moorland, an 1854 painting by John William Inchbold

== See also ==
- Mooreland (disambiguation)
- Moreland (disambiguation)
- Moorlands (disambiguation)
