= John Moreland (disambiguation) =

John Moreland (born 1985) is an American singer-songwriter.

John Moreland may also refer to:

- John Moreland (entrepreneur) (born 1965), American entrepreneur
- John Moreland (footballer), Scottish footballer
- John Munne Moreland (1921-2012), New Zealand ichthyologist
