= Morland =

Morland may refer to:

== Places ==
- Morland, Cumbria, England
- Morland, Kansas, USA

== Given names ==
- Morland Wilson, Jamaican politician
- Morland Holmes, the fictive father of Sherlock Holmes in the American drama television series Elementary

== Surnames ==
- Morland (surname)

== See also ==
- Morland Brewery, opened in 1711, closed in 2000
- The Morland Dynasty, a series of novels by Cynthia Harrod-Eagles
- Moorland (disambiguation)
- Mooreland (disambiguation)
- Moreland (disambiguation)
- Westmorland
