= Open prison =

Prison where the detainees serve their sentences with minimal supervision

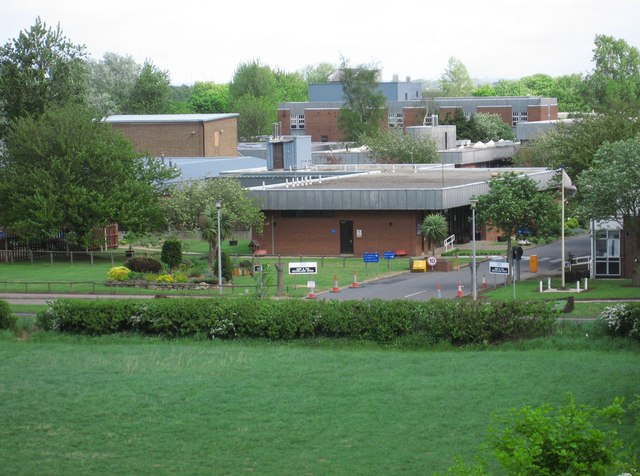
HM Prison Hatfield, South Yorkshire, an open prison in England

An open prison or open jail is a jail in which prisoners are trusted to complete sentences with minimal supervision and perimeter security, and are often not locked up in their prison cells. Prisoners may be permitted to take up employment while serving their sentence, thus encouraging them to reintegrate into society while withdrawing from criminal behavior. Without the constraints and stresses of typical incarcerations, they can discover more constructive lifestyles through support and light supervision from the criminal justice system. Such arrangements give prisoners time to improve their mental health and increase their chances of future employment. Despite these benefits, some scholars have pointed out that new forms of “pains of imprisonment” can emerge within open prisons, arising from the stresses of “liberty under constraint.”

== United Kingdom ==
In the UK, open prisons are often part of a rehabilitation plan for prisoners moved from closed prisons. They may be designated "training prisons" and are only for prisoners considered a low risk to the public.

== Indonesia ==
In Indonesia, open prisons have been used to substitute immigrant detention centers and closed prison incarceration. This change has been helpful in creating a humane environment for immigrants that is less confining than incarceration and detention centers. These open prisons tend to do a better job at providing basic needs and creating better conditions than detention centers. The assistance of the International Organization of Migration contributed to Indonesia's government efforts to create alternative systems to detention. In 2018, refugees and asylum seekers no longer housed in immigration detention centers, and open prisons became one of trial substitutes for immigrants. Entry into open prisons may be dependent upon agreements to follow Indonesia law, consistently report to local authorities, and adhere to discretionary rules while being in the country.

The idea of an open prison is often criticized by members of the public and politicians, despite its success towards rehabilitation compared to older, more draconian methods. Prisoners in open jails do not have complete freedom and are only allowed to leave the premises for specific purposes, such as going to an outside job. In Ireland, there has been controversy about the level of escape from open prisons, attributed to their use by the Irish Prison Service not just to transfer prisoners suitable for open conditions, but also to reduce overcrowding in closed prisons. The idea of open prisons is to rehabilitate prisoners rather than to punish them.

== Examples of open prisons ==
=== Finland ===
- Suomenlinna prison, in Suomenlinna, Helsinki

=== India ===
- Nettukaltheri Open Prison & Correctional Home, Thiruvananthapuram
- Cheemeni Open Prison & Correctional Home, Kasaragod
- Poojapura Women Open Prison & Correctional Home, Thiruvananthapuram
- Yerwada Open Jail, in Yerwada, Pune, Maharashtra
- Tihar Open Jail, in Delhi
- Sampurnanand Open Jail, in Sitarganj, Uttarakhand

=== Ireland ===
- Loughan House, Blacklion, County Cavan, Ireland
- Shelton Abbey Prison, Arklow, County Wicklow, Ireland

=== Philippines ===
- Iwahig Prison and Penal Farm

=== United Kingdom ===
England (men's)

- HM Prison Ford, Ford, West Sussex
- HM Prison Leyhill, South Gloucestershire
- HM Prison Hatfield, South Yorkshire
- HM Prison Haverigg, Cumbria
- HM Prison Thorn Cross, Cheshire
- HM Prison Hollesley Bay, Suffolk
- HM Prison Kirkham, Lancashire
- HM Prison Kirklevington Grange, North Yorkshire
- HM Prison North Sea Camp, Lincolnshire
- HM Prison Spring Hill, Buckinghamshire
- HM Prison Standford Hill, Kent
- HM Prison Sudbury, Derbyshire

England (women's)

- HM Prison Askham Grange, York
- HM Prison East Sutton Park, Kent

Wales

- HM Prison Prescoed, Monmouthshire

Scotland

- HM Prison Castle Huntly, Longforgan, Perth and Kinross

== Germany ==
In Germany, open prisons are a part of the rehabilitation process for about 16% of prisoners.

== In fiction ==
Trumble, a fictional open prison in Florida, is the major setting for John Grisham's novel The Brethren.

== See also ==
- Closed prison
- Prison security categories in the United Kingdom
- House arrest
- Penal colony
- Club Fed, similar phenomenon in US and Canada
