= Moorlands =

Moorlands may refer to:

- Moorlands, Auchenflower, a heritage-listed building in Brisbane, Queensland, Australia
- Moorlands, South Australia, a locality east of Tailem Bend, Australia
- Moorland, a type of habitat found in upland areas
- The Moorlands, home ground of Moor Green F.C.

== See also ==
- Moorland (disambiguation)
