= Mooreland =

Mooreland may refer to a place in the United States:

- Mooreland, Indiana
- Mooreland, Oklahoma
- Mooreland (Brentwood, Tennessee), a house on the National Register of Historic Places (NRHP)

== See also ==
- Moorland (disambiguation)
- Moreland (disambiguation)
- Morland (disambiguation)
- Westmorland
