= John Moreland (footballer) =

English footballer

Personal information
- Full name: John Moreland
- Place of birth: Plains, North Lanarkshire, Scotland
- Position: Inside forward

Senior career*
Years	Team	Apps	(Gls)
1896–1897	Nelson		
1897–1899	Blackburn Rovers	20	(6)
Total		20	(6)
- * Club domestic league appearances and goals

John Moreland was a Scottish footballer who played in the Football League for Blackburn Rovers.
