= Moreland, Gloucester =

Area and electoral ward in the City of Gloucester, England

Coordinates: 51°51′N 2°15′W

Moreland is an area and electoral ward in the City of Gloucester, Gloucestershire, England. The area is commonly known locally as Linden: the electoral ward is named after the Moreland match factory which closed in 1976. The population of the Gloucester ward was 10,253 at the 2011 Census.
