= Moreland Township =

Moreland Township may refer to the following townships in the United States:

- Moreland Township, Pope County, Arkansas
- Moreland Township, Pennsylvania, in Lycoming County
- Moreland Township, Montgomery County, Pennsylvania
- Moreland Township, Philadelphia County, Pennsylvania

== See also ==
- Lower Moreland Township, Montgomery County, Pennsylvania
- Upper Moreland Township, Pennsylvania
