= Neil Moreland =

Scottish footballer

Personal information
- Full name: Neil Moreland
- Place of birth: Scotland
- Positions: Forward; centre half

Senior career*
Years	Team	Apps	(Gls)
1914–1919	Heart of Midlothian	5	(0)
- Broxburn United
1922–1923	Albion Rovers	13	(5)
1923–1924	Dykehead	2	(1)
- * Club domestic league appearances and goals

Neil Moreland was a Scottish professional footballer who played in the Scottish League for Albion Rovers, Heart of Midlothian and Dykehead as a forward.

== Personal life ==
Moreland served as a sergeant in the Highland Light Infantry and Royal Scots during the First World War.

== Career statistics ==
Appearances and goals by club, season and competition
Club	Season	League			National Cup		Other		Total	
Club	Season	Division	Apps	Goals	Apps	Goals	Apps	Goals	Apps	Goals
Heart of Midlothian	1913–14	Scottish First Division	3	0	0	0	2 (Note: Appearances in North Eastern Cup)	2	5	2
Heart of Midlothian	1915–16	Scottish First Division	2	0	—		0	0	2	0
Heart of Midlothian	Total		5	0	0	0	2	2	7	2
Alloa Athletic	1922–23	Scottish First Division	13	5	0	0	—		13	5
Dykehead	1923–24	Scottish First Division	2	1	0	0	—		2	1
Career total			20	6	0	0	2	2	22	8
