= HM Prison North Sea Camp =

Men's prison in Lincolnshire, England

Coordinates: 52°56′21.31″N 0°3′49.40″E

HMP North Sea Camp
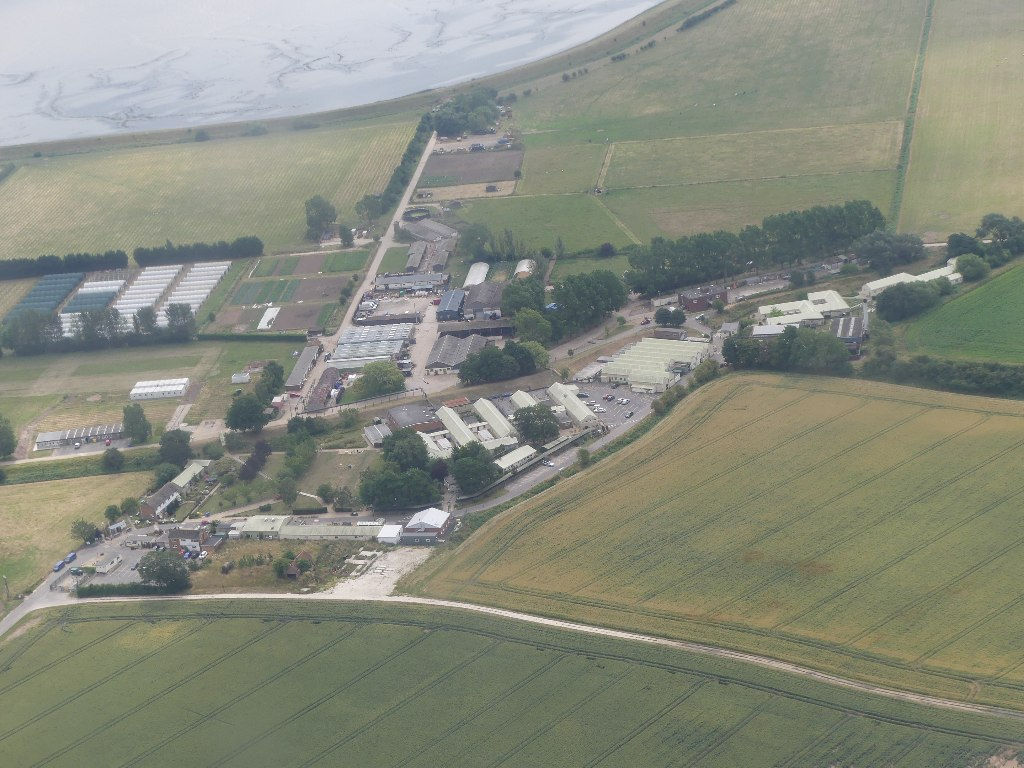
- Aerial photograph of HMP North Sea Camp in 2023
- Interactive map of HMP North Sea Camp
- Location: Freiston, Lincolnshire
- Security class: Adult Male/Category D
- Population: 403 (April 2018)
- Opened: 1935
- Managed by: HM Prison Services
- Governor: David Nicholson
- Website: North Sea Camp at justice.gov.uk

HM Prison North Sea Camp is a men's open prison (Category D), located on the edge of the parish of Freiston (near Boston) in Lincolnshire, England. North Sea Camp is operated by His Majesty's Prison Service.

== History ==
North Sea Camp opened as a borstal in 1935, having been established by a group of Borstal Trainees who had been marched cross-country from Stafford. They set up a campsite, and immediately began work building a sea wall to protect the site from the North Sea. Once this was complete, they began reclaiming land by building a further sea wall – that land then became the prison farm. Until the sale of adjacent land in 2004, the prison had the biggest prison farm in the United Kingdom, much of which was on land reclaimed from The Wash.

=== Abscondings ===
In August 2006, the BBC reported that 49 prisoners had absconded from North Sea Camp in the previous twelve months, and that a total of 339 had absconded since 1996. In 2009, two inmates convicted of rape absconded from North Sea Camp. The two were recaptured less than a week later. Paul Robson, who was jailed for life in 2000 for violent sexual assaults, and had been refused parole five times, absconded from the prison in February 2022. He was recaptured four days later.

=== Dispatches ===
In April 2007, Channel 4 TV's Dispatches documentary series broadcast film secretly recorded at North Sea Camp by a prisoner, Dafydd Evans. Evans's filming showed prisoners taking drugs and smuggling alcohol. He also demonstrated apparent weaknesses in the prison's security procedures and described the escape of a man with convictions for robbery and arson which he blamed on security failures and collusion by fellow prisoners. Lord Ramsbotham, a former Chief Inspector of Prisons for England and Wales, was quoted in the programme as saying: "It is not secure; it’s under-staffed, it’s under-resourced and you’ve got a lot of people who quite frankly should not be in those conditions. The system of sending people to these places has broken down." Responding to the programme, the Home Office said open prisons played an important role in rehabilitating offenders and all those transferred to such conditions were risk-assessed.

In November 2009, an inspection report from Her Majesty's Chief Inspector of Prisons stated that North Sea Camp Prison had improved. Inspectors praised the prison's safety record, and the amount of purposeful activity for inmates. However, the report called for the refurbishment of prison buildings and facilities, and further improvements to the prison regime for short-term inmates.

=== Day release of rapist ===
In July 2025 staff at HMP North Sea Camp released Neil Trennan on day release from the prison. Trennan, 61, already subject to two life sentences for violent sex offences, failed to return. Trennan went on to attempt to rape a young student.

Sentenced to a third life sentence on 26 February 2026, by His Honour Judge Jeremy Richardson KC stated it was “extremely surprising” that Trennan had been moved to North Sea Camp and astonishing that he had been given license for the day to leave the prison unsupervised.

The Judge took the unusual step of writing directly to the Lord Chancellor alerting him to the situation in case he wished to investigate.

== Notable prisoners ==
- Jeffrey Archer in 2001–2002
- Gary Hart (guilty of causing the Selby rail crash) in 2003
- Andrew Malkinson, wrongly convicted of rape in 2003
