= William Moreland =

William Moreland may refer to:

- Bunk Moreland, a fictional character in the TV series The Wire
- William Hall Moreland (1861–1946), bishop of the Missionary District of Sacramento
- William Harrison Moreland, British civil servant
- SS William C. Moreland, a Great Lakes freighter
