= John Moreland (entrepreneur) =

American entrepreneur and venture capitalist (born 1965)

John Moreland (born June 19, 1965) is an American entrepreneur and venture capitalist. He is the founder of Avetta, an online supplier management marketplace, and president of Operation Underground Railroad.

== Early life ==
Moreland was born in Fullerton, California and raised in Irvine, California.

== Career ==
Moreland became a police officer and spent most of his career as a canine handler. Moreland's longtime partner, Crambo, a veteran K-9 officer, was adopted by Moreland's family when the dog was retired from service.

Moreland had financial challenges with Avetta early on and eventually received $30,000 to help the company after taking second place in a business plan competition from Brigham Young University in 2005. He otherwise bootstrapped the company before raising venture capital — $35 million in a Series A investment from Norwest Venture Partners in December 2012 and a Series B round of $30 million in February 2015. At that time, Avetta had been operating in over 100 countries around the world.

In 2018, Welsh, Carson, Anderson & Stowe (WCAS), acquired a majority equity interest in Avetta.
