= Moreland (Bethesda, Maryland) =

Historic house in Maryland, United States

- U.S. National Register of Historic Places
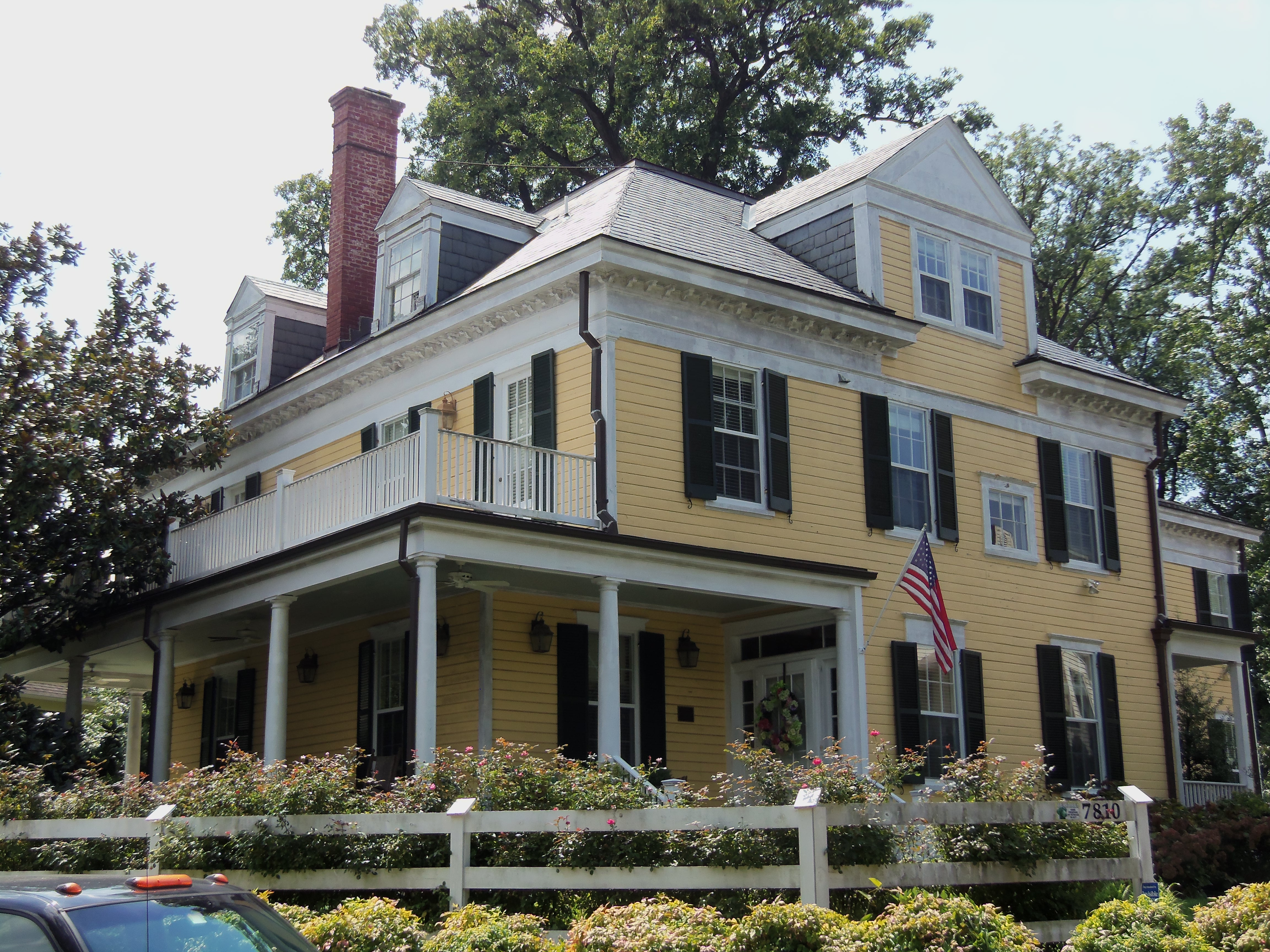
- Moreland, August 2012

- Location within Maryland Location within the United States
- Location: 7810 Moorland Ln., Bethesda, Maryland
- Coordinates: 38°59′16″N 77°6′39″W
- Area: 0.5 acres (0.20 ha)
- Built: 1894
- Architectural style: Greek Revival
- NRHP reference No.: 05000877
- Added to NRHP: August 11, 2005

Moreland is a historic home located at Bethesda, Montgomery County, Maryland, United States. It is a 2 1/2-story early Colonial Revival frame dwelling that was constructed about 1894. The home was the summer residence for Washington, D.C., businessman and former District of Columbia Commissioner Samuel E. Wheatley, and that family owned it from 1894 until 1944.

Moreland was listed on the National Register of Historic Places in 2005.
