= Tudor Rose, Southall =

Coordinates: 51.5034°N 0.3808°W

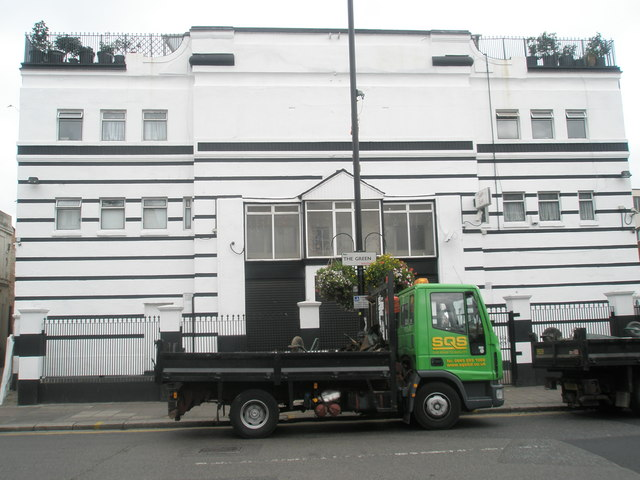

The Tudor Rose is a nightclub, live music venue and former cinema in Southall, Ealing, London.

The premises opened in 1910 as the Southall Electric Theatre, and renamed to the Gem Cinema the following year, with a 500 capacity. A balcony was added in 1929, increasing the capacity to 758. It was renamed Century Cinema in 1955 and closed two years later. It subsequently became a warehouse before reopening as a specialist cinema for Bollywood films, catering for the local British Asian community. This closed in 1980.

In 1983, the premises reopened as the Tudor Rose, and became an important venue for local British African-Caribbean people. It was reported to be the only black-owned venue in Southall, and catered for weddings, parties and funerals in addition to live music events. In 2002, two men were shot dead inside the venue, while it was holding an anti-gun event. A man was charged with the murder but later acquitted. In 2014, police revoked the venue's licence after it had gained a reputation for violence and disorder. The decision was reviewed the following year in court, but upheld. Its licence was restored in 2019.

In June 2020, Black Lives Matter staged a protest outside the venue after Ealing Borough Council announced it could be demolished as part of refurbishment plans in the area to build new housing. In October, police broke up a wedding reception at the venue with 100 guests, violating local social isolating laws in response to the COVID-19 pandemic. A spokesman for the local police said the venue had been reported and could face a £10,000 fine for the incident.
