= HM Prison Moorland =

Prison in South Yorkshire, England

Coordinates: 53.548550°N 0.971700°W

HMP Moorland
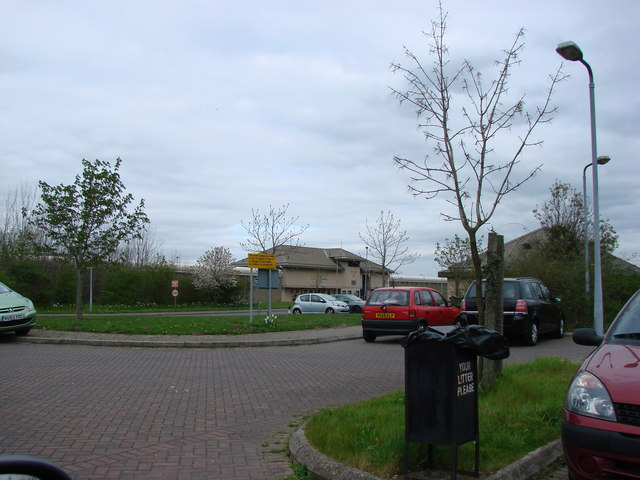
- Moorland Prison entrance
- Interactive map of HMP Moorland
- Location: Hatfield Woodhouse, South Yorkshire
- Security class: Adult Male/Young Offender
- Population: 960 (July 2018)
- Managed by: HM Prison Services
- Website: Moorland at justice.gov.uk

HM Prison Moorland (formerly HM Prison Moorland Closed) is a Category C men's prison and Young Offenders Institution, near Hatfield Woodhouse in South Yorkshire, England. The prison is operated by His Majesty's Prison Service, and is jointly managed with the nearby HM Prison Hatfield.

== History ==
In March 2005, Moorland Prison was subjected to rioting when more than 40 inmates refused to return to their cells. It took four hours and the intervention of staff and officers from neighbouring institutions to quell the situation.

In August 2006, a report from Her Majesty's Chief Inspector of Prisons stated that both Moorland and Hatfield Prisons were well managed, and provided "a safe and respectful environment" for inmates and staff, but the report also claimed that the regime at Moorland Prison was "over-punitive and under-motivating".

On 14 July 2011, it was announced that HMP & YOI Moorland would be put out to tender, accepting bids from private companies and HM Prison Service for the management of the establishment.

In 2011, Moorland Open Prison was renamed Hatfield Prison, and Moorland Closed Prison was renamed Moorland Prison.

In July 2011, it was announced that Moorland along with several other publicly operated prisons, would be market tested, allowing private operators as well as HM Prison service, to tender for the contract to operate the prison.

== The prison today ==
Moorland is a prison holding Category C adult males and young offenders. Prisoners are either released straight from Moorland, or are transferred to Hatfield Prison. Accommodation at the prison is divided into 7 Houseblocks, with a total of 180 double cells and 614 single cells. Houseblocks 1, 2 and 5 house 'Residential 1' prisoners, while Houseblocks 3, 4, 6 and 8 house 'Residential 2' prisoners, also known as VPs (Vulnerable Prisoners). Houseblock 7 houses elderly and disabled Residential 2 prisoners.

Offending Behaviour groups and Enhanced Thinking Skills Courses are offered to inmates at Moorland Prison, as well as Welfare to Work programmes and Job Clubs. There is also a Listener Scheme for those who may be at risk from suicide or self-harm. Community projects are also offered.

== Notable inmates ==
- Michael Barton
- Prince Naseem Hamed, former boxing world champion, jailed for driving dangerously.
- Adam Johnson
- Juress Kika, murderer of 16-year-old Ben Kinsella
- Sean Mercer
- Jake Fahri, murderer of 16-year-old Jimmy Mizen
- Peter Lynch died in HMP Moorland
