= HM Prison Hatfield =

Prison in South Yorkshire, England

Coordinates: 53.586700°N 0.981500°W

HMP & YOI Hatfield
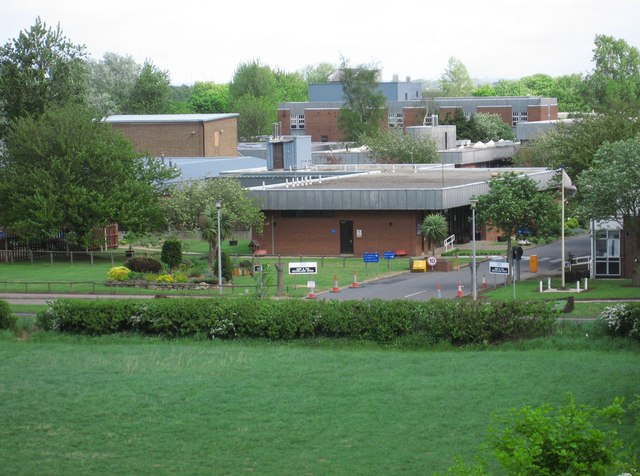
- Interactive map of HMP & YOI Hatfield
- Location: Hatfield Woodhouse, South Yorkshire
- Security class: Adult Male/Young Offender
- Population: 378 (December 2019)
- Managed by: HM Prison Services
- Governor: Mick Mills
- Website: Hatfield at justice.gov.uk

HM Prison Hatfield (formerly HMP & YOI Moorland Open) is a Category D men's prison and young offenders institution, located near Hatfield Woodhouse in South Yorkshire, England. The prison is operated by His Majesty's Prison Service.

== History ==
In August 2006, a report from Her Majesty's Chief Inspector of Prisons stated that both Moorland and HMP & YOI Hatfield Prisons were well managed, and provided a safe and respectful environment for inmates and staff. However the report also claimed that more than a third of prisoners were unoccupied at HMP & YOI Hatfield, with a lengthy waiting list of inmates wanting to join education classes.

Weeks later, it was revealed that in a three-year period 190 inmates had escaped from HMP & YOI Hatfield. The Prison Service did not have statistics on how many of these inmates had been recaptured, but claimed that "most would have been returned to a closed prison at some point."

In 2010 HMP & YOI Moorland Open changed its name to become HMP & YOI Hatfield; which is still managed jointly with HMP & YOI Moorland.

On 13 July 2011, it was announced that HMP & YOI Hatfield would be put out to tender, accepting bids from private companies and HM Prison Service for the management of the establishment.

== The prison today ==
HMP & YOI Hatfield is a prison holding Category D adult males and young offenders. Prisoners are usually transferred from other prisons (especially Moorland Closed) to complete their sentences at HMP & YOI Hatfield. Accommodation at the prison comprises 4 units for adult male prisoners, and 1 unit for young offenders. All cells are single occupancy.

Adult prisoners at HMP & YOI Hatfield are usually placed in resettlement employment, with outside companies with guaranteed minimum wage. Young Offenders are usually placed in education and vocational training. Courses include industrial cleaning and catering.

== Notable former inmates ==
- Naseem Hamed
- Ian Brady
