= Roland de la Poype =

French soldier (1920–2012)

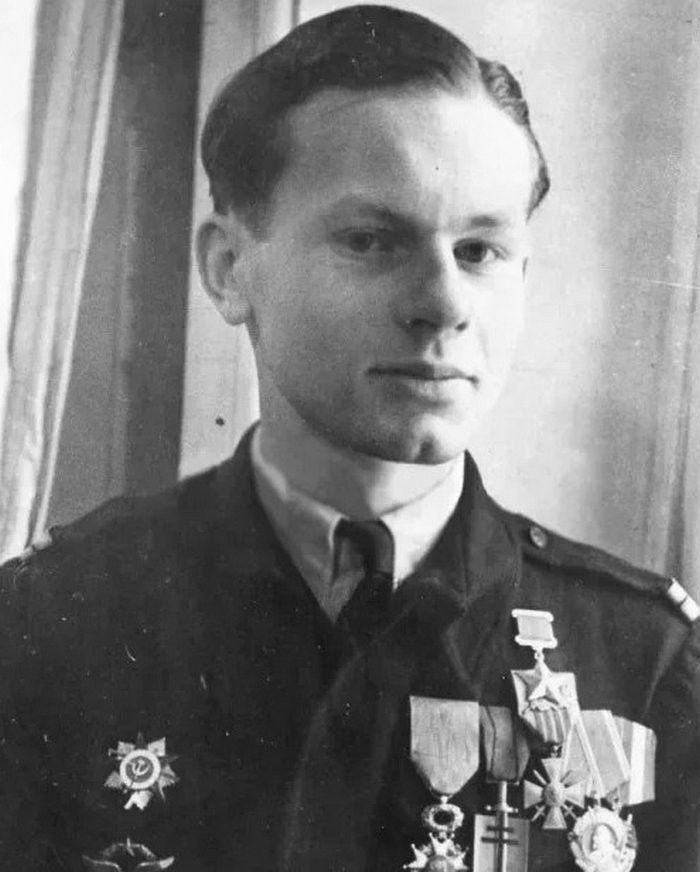
- Roland de la Poype in 1944
- Born: 28 July 1920; Les Pradeaux, France
- Died: 23 October 2012 (aged 92); Saint-Tropez, France
- Burial place: Cimetière Chapelle Saint-Didier Cozance Trept, Departement de l'Isère, Rhône-Alpes, France
- Military career
- Allegiance: France
- Branch: Free French Air Force; Royal Air Force
- Service years: 1939–1947
- Units: No 602 Squadron; Normandie-Niemen
- Known for: Aviator, flying ace, industrialist.
- Conflicts: World War II

Roland Paulze d'Ivoy de la Poype (28 July 1920 – 23 October 2012) was a Second World War fighter ace and a member of the Normandie-Niemen fighter group that fought on the Soviet front attributed with 16 confirmed victories.

He was also a politician, a pioneering industrialist in the plastics industry and the founder of the Antibes Marineland in 1970.

== Biography ==
Roland de la Poype was born on 28 July 1920 at the Château de la Grange Fort in Les Pradeaux. His father, Xavier Paulze d'Ivoy de la Poype, an agronomist and reserve officer in the French army, was killed at the front in May 1940.

== Wartime service ==
Aged 19 years old in August 1939 de la Poype enrolled in the French air force and began training as a pilot. He finished his training in March 1940, shortly before the German invasion of France. With comrades from the fighter training school of Etampes, he managed to flee to Saint-Jean-de-Luz to board a ship to England.

After serving in French Equatorial Africa from July 1940 to January 1941 with the Free French Air Force, he joined the Royal Air Force as a Sergeant and was assigned to No 602 Squadron, flying Supermarine Spitfires in July 1941. An indication of his flying abilities, he was selected as wingman by the squadron's commanding officer, 32-victory Irish ace, Squadron Leader Paddy Finucane.

He claimed his first aircraft destroyed, a Messerschmitt Bf 109, on 22 August 1942 over Gravelines, and flew more than 60 combat missions.

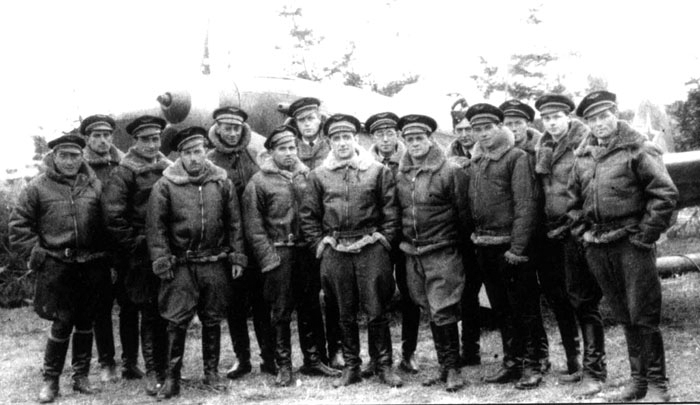
The Neu Neu (Normandy-Niemen) in 1942. Roland de la Poype is second from the right.

Upon learning that a group of French volunteers was to be sent to the Soviet front, he joined the Normandie fighter group and was part of the first batch of 12 French pilots who, via transfers through Lebanon and Iraq, arrived in Ivanovo in the Soviet Union on 28 November 1942. The two squadrons, initially called the Normandie Group, were assigned the Yak-1B fighter and attached to the 303rd Fighter Aviation Division of the 1st Air Army.

On 31 August 1943 he shot down a Ju 87 Stuka dive-bomber. This was his second aerial victory and his first on the Soviet front.

In early 1945, with the rank of captain, he commanded the 1st squadron of the fighter group. Present in the Soviet Union until June 20, 1945, "the Marquis", or "Pohype" as he was nicknamed by his comrades. He ended the war with a total tally of 16 confirmed aerial victories (7 solo and 9 shared victories), one (and 11 shared) probables, and one aircraft damaged in almost 200 missions, most of which were achieved while flying with top French ace and Commanding Officer Marcel Albert. De la Poype was one of only four members of the regiment to be awarded the title of Hero of the Soviet Union and a Companions of Liberation at only 27 years old.

Totaling 1,200 flight hours, he was authorized by Stalin to bring his Yak back to French territory. Assigned to the 2nd Bureau of the Air Force General Staff in March 1946, Roland de la Poype left the army in 1947. The reserve commander Roland de la Poype, who became a civilian again after the war, held several positions.He was appointed a member of the Council of the Order of Liberation in September 2002. President Nicolas Sarkozy presented him with the Grand Cross of the Legion of Honour during a ceremony at the Élysée Palace in Paris on 14 April 2008.

== List of credited aerial victories ==
Plane show down	Date	Unit	Plane flown	Location
Messerschmitt Bf 109	22 August 1942	No 602 Squadron	Supermarine Spitfire	Gravelines
Junkers Ju 87	31 August 1943	Normandie	Yak-1M	Lenina
Focke-Wulf Fw 190	1 September 1943	Normandie	Yak-1M	Lenina
Focke-Wulf Fw 190	4 September 1943	Normandie	Yak-1M	Lenina
Junkers Ju 87	9 September 1943	Normandie	Yak-1M	Lenina
Junkers Ju 87	22 September 1943	Normandie	Yak-1M	Smolensk
Henschel Hs 126	4 October 1943	Normandie	Yak-1M	Krasno
Focke-Wulf Fw 190	13 October 1943	Normandie	Yak-1M	Gorky
Messerschmitt Bf 109	14 October 1944	Normandie	Yak 9	Ragnit
Junkers Ju 87	16 October 1944	Normandie	Yak 9	Pilluponen
Junkers Ju 87	16 October 1944	Normandie	Yak 9	Pilluponen
Focke-Wulf Fw 190	16 October 1944	Normandie	Yak 9	Stallupoenen
Focke-Wulf Fw 190	16 October 1944	Normandie	Yak 9	Stallupoenen
Henschel Hs 129	18 October 1944	Normandie	Yak 9	Stallupoenen
Focke-Wulf Fw 190	23 October 1944	Normandie	Yak 9	Gumbinnen
Messerschmitt Bf 109	26 October 1944	Normandie	Yak 9	Walterkehmen

== Plastic industry career ==
An inventor, de la Poype understood that plastics and disposable packaging would become very important. As head of the Société d'Etudes et d'Applications du Plastique, he set up his first plastics factory in May 1947. He is also the designer of the Citroen Mehari. He and his firm were behind the iconic 1960's DOP shampoo packaging for L'Oreal called the Berlingot DOP (after a traditional french tetrahedron-shaped flavored sugar sweet) . Indivudual doses of colored, belingot-shaped shampoo doses in soft plastic tube were sold in 100 units glass jars and marketed with innovative advertising radio and TV shows and creative short film clips

== Marineland in Antibes ==
De la Poype created the Marineland in Antibes in 1970 in order to educate the public about marine life. He retired in 1985 but retained ownership until 2006. He and his artist wife Marie-Nöelle lived in a lavish Paris apartment a half-mile from the Trocadero.

He was also mayor of Champigné and was the owner of a golf course near Angers.

== Writings ==
- Roland de la Poype, L'épopée du Normandie-Niémen, Perrin, 2007

== Medals and awards ==
- Grand Croix of the French Légion d'Honneur, the order's highest rank
- Compagnon de la Libération (29 December 1944)
- Croix de Guerre 1939–1945 with 12 citations
- Czechoslovak War Cross 1939–1945
- Hero of the Soviet Union
- Order of the Red Banner
- Order of Lenin
- Order of the Patriotic War, 1st class
- Medal "For the Victory over Germany in the Great Patriotic War 1941–1945"
