= Ulises (orca) =

Captive male orca (born c. 1977)

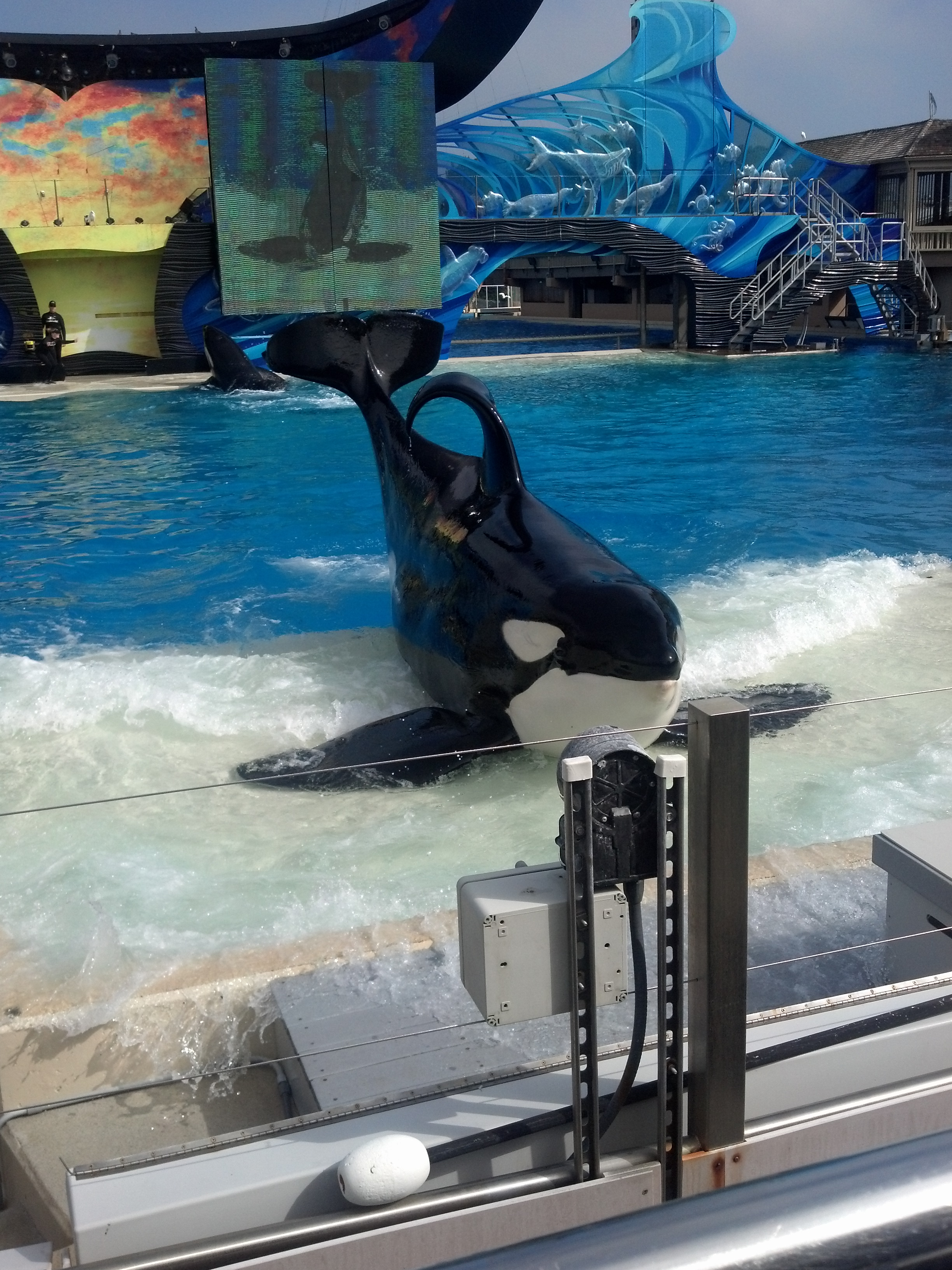
- Ulises on the slideout at SeaWorld San Diego in 2013.
- Species: Orca (Orcinus orca)
- Breed: Icelandic
- Sex: Male
- Born: c. 1977 (age 48–49)
- Years active: 1980–present
- Known for: Oldest male captive orca as of 2024
- Mate: Kalia (born 2004)
- Offspring: Moana (son) (2011–2023); Amaya (daughter) (2014–2021)
- Weight: 4,445 kg (9,800 lb)
- Height: 20 ft 0 in (6.10 m)

Ulises (also spelled Ulysses) (born c. 1977) is a male orca who lives at SeaWorld San Diego in California. He was captured off the coast of Iceland in 1980 and is currently the oldest male orca in captivity as of 2022. SeaWorld San Diego celebrates his birthday on 2 January every year.

== Capture and early life ==
Ulises was captured on November 7, 1980, at Reydarfjördur, Iceland, when he was approximately 3 years old. He was taken to Sædýrasafnið, also known as the Hafnarfjörður Aquarium, in Iceland, a facility in which orcas recently captured from Iceland were housed while they adjusted to captivity. After spending around a month in Iceland, Ulises was sold to a private zoological company in Tarragona, Spain, Río León Safari.

== Life in Spain ==
Ulises spent two years at Río León Safari before they became unable to take care of him properly. He was taken in by the Barcelona Zoo in July 1983. In Barcelona, he was housed with bottlenose dolphins, and became popular with guests.

Over time, Ulises began chewing on his tongue, chasing the dolphins he shared his tank with, and attempted to bite his tank cleaners. Zoo Barcelona decided in November 1992 to send him to SeaWorld San Diego for a number of years while a new, larger tank could be built. Animal rights activists protested the decision, and lobbied to have him returned to Iceland and released. Eventually, it was decided to send Ulises to SeaWorld permanently, and he was shipped out on February 9, 1994.

== Life at SeaWorld ==
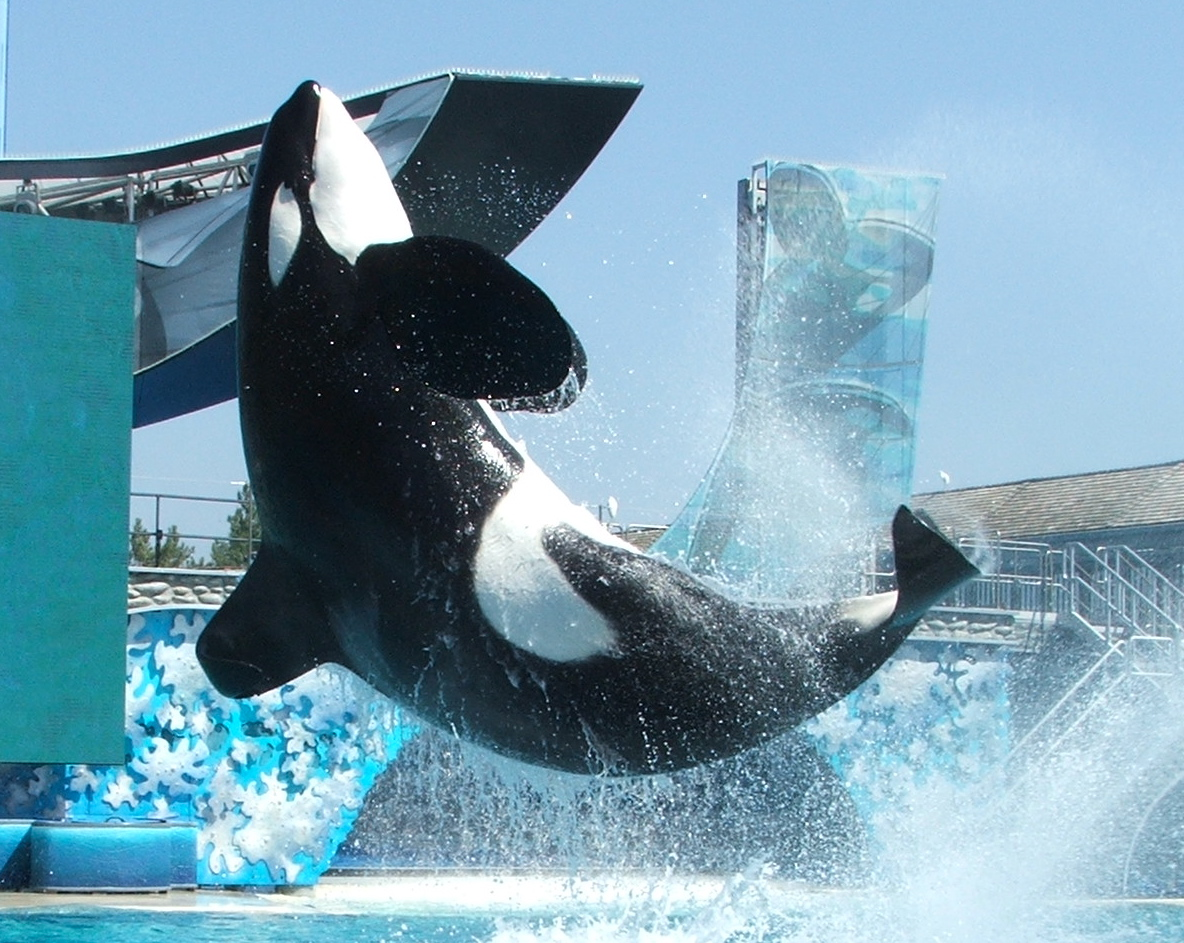
Ulises performing at SeaWorld San Diego in 2007.

At SeaWorld, Ulises was introduced to the rest of the park's orcas. He showed aggression towards female Corky, and the two were not allowed to be present in the same pool without the presence of more dominant female Kasatka. Ulises was the largest orca at SeaWorld San Diego until Ikaika surpassed him in size in late 2021. Ulises measures 21 feet long and weighs in at 9,800 pounds as of January 2022

Originally, waterwork (behaviors in which trainers are present in the water with the orca) was performed with Ulises, but it was halted in 2006 after a series of behavioral incidents. In 2008, trainers began making attempts to reintroduce waterwork to Ulises, but waterwork at all SeaWorld parks was permanently halted after the death of Dawn Brancheau in 2010.

Ulises was trained to provide semen samples for use in artificial insemination. On 16 March 2011, Wikie at Marineland of Antibes gave birth to a calf, a male named Moana sired by Ulises through artificial insemination. It was the first successful orca artificial insemination in Europe. In 2014, SeaWorld announced that Kalia was pregnant. She had both mated naturally with Ulises and been artificially inseminated with his sperm, and the park was unsure which method had gotten her pregnant. On 2 December 2014, Kalia gave birth to her calf, Amaya.

== See also ==
- List of individual cetaceans
