= Branton, South Yorkshire =

Village in South Yorkshire, England

Coordinates: 53.509°N 1.034°W

Branton
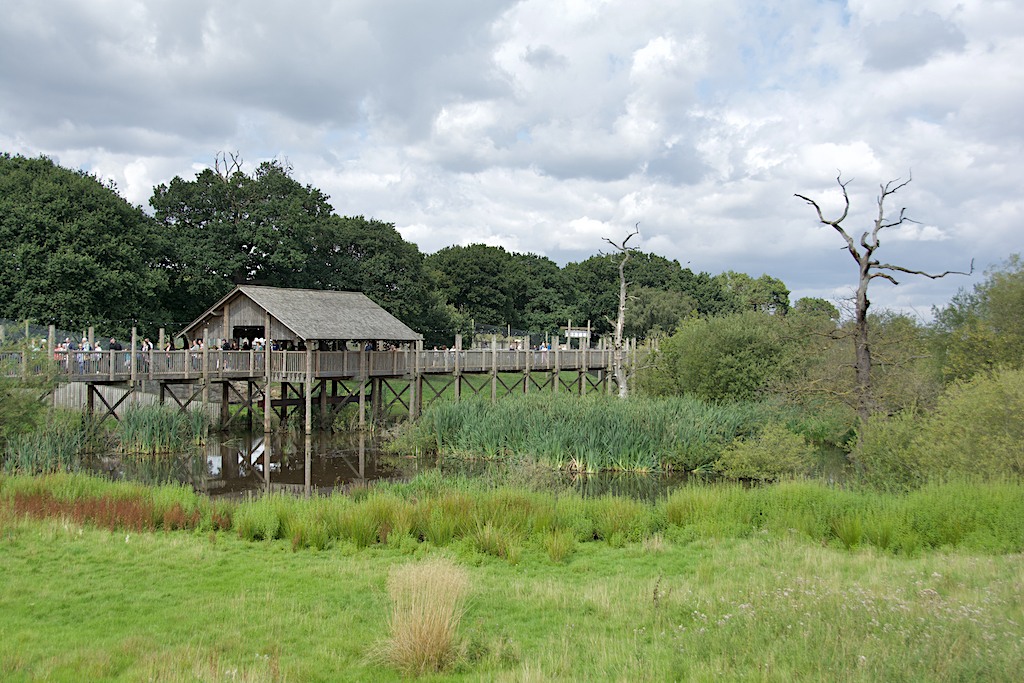
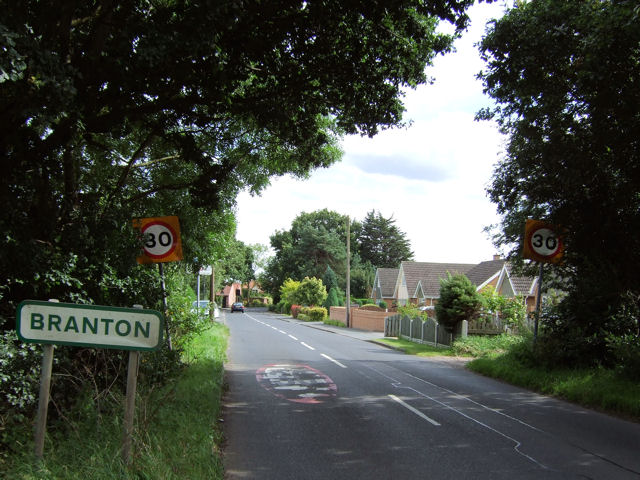
- Top: Yorkshire Wildlife Park | Bottom: Branton sign when entering from the north.

- Location within South Yorkshire
- Population: 1,822 2021 Census
- OS grid reference: SE6401
- Civil parish: Cantley, South Yorkshire
- Metropolitan borough: Doncaster
- Metropolitan county: South Yorkshire
- Region: Yorkshire and the Humber
- Country: England
- Sovereign state: United Kingdom
- Post town: DONCASTER
- Postcode district: DN3
- Dialling code: 01302
- Police: South Yorkshire
- Fire: South Yorkshire
- Ambulance: Yorkshire
- UK Parliament: Don Valley

Branton is a village in South Yorkshire, England. It is about 4 miles (6.4 km) east of Doncaster. At the 2021 Census, it had a population of 1,822.

== History ==
Branton is mentioned in the Domesday Book as belonging to Geoffrey Alselin as having 15 ploughlands, and a church. The name Branton derives from the Old English Brōm-tūn; the farmstead/town where the broom grew (or town among the broom). The village was formerly in the wapentake of Strafforth and Tickhill. In 1951, a farmer ploughing fields at Kilham Farm to the north east of the village, discovered fragments of pottery. The site has since been surveyed and documented as Romano-British pottery location which had several kilns, using the nearby River Torne for transport pottery away from Branton.

There is a primary school in the village, named St Wilfrid's, which was rated as Good by Ofsted in 2019. There is a post office, newsagent, barbers and pub in the village. There used to be a chapel and a church but these have been demolished. The pub is called the Three Horseshoes, and was renovated in 1907. A frequent bus service connects the village with Cantley and Doncaster.

The Yorkshire Wildlife Park is immediately to the south of the village; it is bounded to the east by the River Torne, and to the west by the M18 motorway, which separates it from Cantley.

== Governance ==
Branton is in the parliamentary constituency of Don Valley, and in the civil parish of Cantley with Branton.
