= Flocke =

Female polar bear born in captivity at the Nuremberg Zoo in Germany

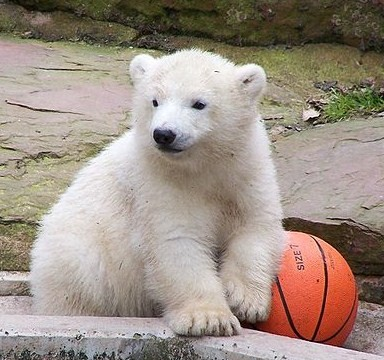
Flocke on 9 April 2008, the day after her public debut

Flocke (German pronunciation: [ˈflɔkə]) is a female polar bear who was born in captivity at the Nuremberg Zoo in Nuremberg, Germany on 11 December 2007. A few weeks after her birth, she was removed from her mother's care after concerns were raised for her safety. Although the zoo had established a strict non-interference policy with its animals, officials chose to raise the cub by hand. This decision came at a time when the zoo was receiving negative attention from the media after another female polar bear reportedly ate her newly born cubs.

Like Knut, a captive-born and handraised polar bear at the Berlin Zoo, Flocke ("flake" in German) quickly became a media sensation. After she made her debut to the public on 8 April 2008, her name was trademarked by the zoo and her image appeared on toys and in advertisements throughout the city. The zoo announced in May 2008 that United Nations Environment Program chief Achim Steiner would be Flocke's official patron with the hope of using the bear as an ambassador to encourage awareness of climate change. In late 2008, a Russian-born male polar bear named Rasputin was introduced to Flocke's enclosure in the hopes that she would gain valuable socializing skills with a member of her own species. In April 2010, both bears were relocated to Marineland in southern France. In 2021 she moved to Yorkshire Wildlife Park.

== Infancy and controversy ==
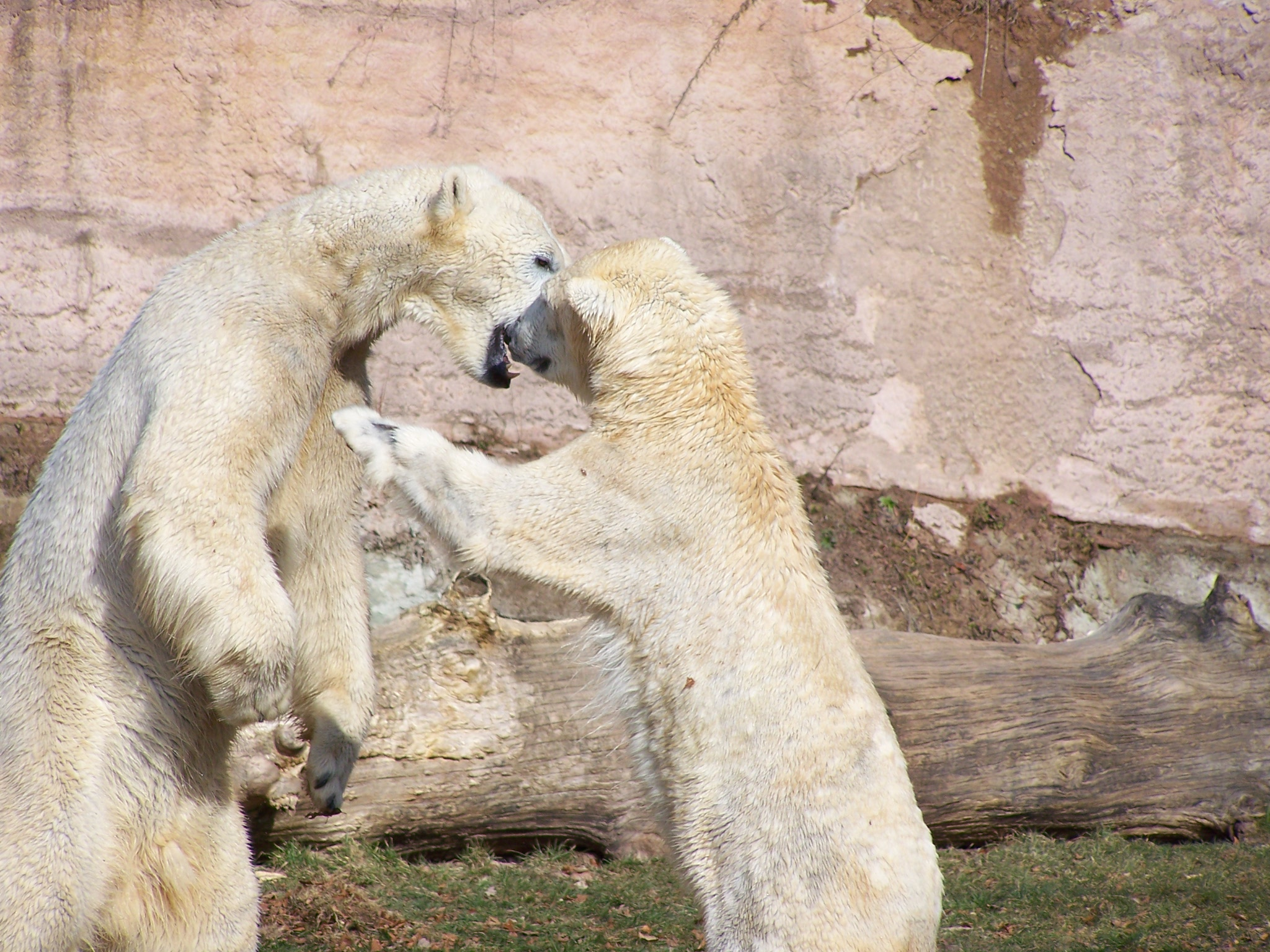
Flocke's parents Felix and Vera

Flocke was born at the Nuremberg Zoo on 11 December 2007 to Vera (born 2002 in Moscow) and Felix (born 2001 in Vienna). Felix also mated with Vera's sister Vilma, who gave birth some weeks earlier in November to what officials thought were two cubs. Zookeepers, enforcing a strict non-interference policy, were not able to determine exactly how many cubs were born. The zoo reportedly did not wish to create a media circus similar to the one that surrounded Knut, an orphaned polar bear at the Berlin Zoo who became an international celebrity the previous year. Days after the zoo reaffirmed its non-interference policy, mass circulation daily Bild ran a story with a headline reading "Why Won't Anyone Save the Cute Baby Knuts in Nuremberg Zoo?"

At the beginning of January, zoo keepers noticed that Vilma appeared nervous; she was seen agitatedly scratching at her feedbox, and there was no further sign of her cubs. It is believed that she devoured them. When asked for a reason, Nuremberg zoo director Dag Encke stated that they could have been ill, a circumstance under which polar bears in the wild often eat their young. The zoo quickly faced harsh criticism throughout Germany and from the worldwide media for appearing to allow the cubs' death. The director of the German Animal Protection Society said the zoo had acted irresponsibly and that "it was the ethical responsibility of the management to give the polar bear cubs a chance of life. Using the argument 'That's Nature' as an excuse for intervening far too late is cynical and inappropriate." Angry visitors gathered in front of the polar bear enclosure and shouted "Rabenmutter" (literally, "raven mother", meaning "evil mother") every time Vilma appeared.

Meanwhile, Vera was seen emerging from her den for the first time; her single cub, helpless at only four weeks old, appeared to be in good health. A couple of days after the media backlash that followed Vilma's missing cubs, Vera began displaying strange behavior such as carrying her then-unnamed cub around the enclosure and repeatedly dropping it on the hard rock floor. Concerned for the cub's safety, the Nuremberg Zoo made a controversial decision to remove her from her mother's care and raise her by hand.

== Fame ==
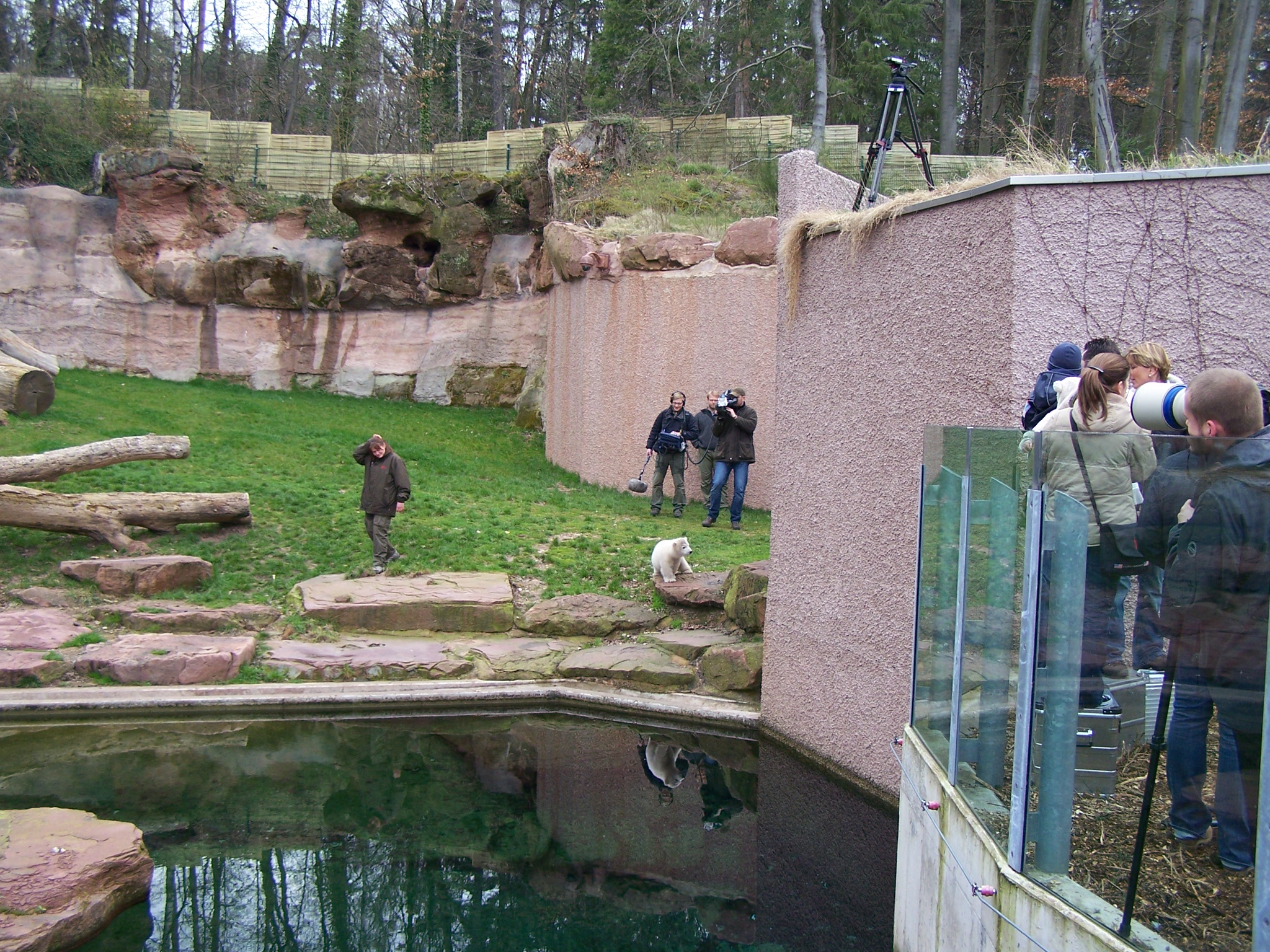
Reporters and visitors watch Flocke play in her enclosure.

Less than a week after Vera's cub was removed from the polar bear enclosure, the zoo dedicated a website to the cub. It provided frequent updates on her health and development, as well as exclusive photographs and videos. The website also showcased a competition in which fans could vote for the cub's name. The official name was announced on 18 January 2008 by Ulrich Maly, mayor of Nuremberg, and broadcast live on television. Despite the overwhelming number of e-mailed suggestions from across the world (including "Stella", "Knutschi", "Sissi" and "Yuki Chan"), the zoo officially named her Flocke, German for "flake", as in "snowflake". "Flocke", used widely by the media previous to her official naming, was the nickname originally given to her by zookeepers because of her white fur.

Flocke's growth was carefully reported by the media during her first few months. Four zookeepers took turns bottle-feeding the cub with 140 milliliters of artificial milk every four hours and news of her eyes opening for the first time made headlines a few days before she was officially named. At five weeks old, she was referred to by the publication Bild as "Mrs. Knut", suggesting that the two German-born polar bears might become mates when they mature. As she grew, Flocke's diet was enriched with dog food, and boiled bones were supplied for her to chew on when she was three months old. She was soon taken to the zoo's beginners' pool to practice her swimming skills. The zoo had previously stated that they were seeking another orphaned polar or brown bear cub to raise alongside Flocke in order to improve her development.

On 8 April 2008, Flocke made her first public appearance in the polar bear enclosure that had once been home to Vilma; the adult polar bear had been relocated to another zoo. The four-month-old cub was greeted by more than 160 journalists and a half-dozen international camera crews on the first day. During the first week, Flocke was displayed for short intervals with breaks at midday. Expecting a peak of 20,000 visitors, the zoo built a viewing platform, capable of holding 500 people at a time, in front of the enclosure, but attendance by zoo patrons was initially lower than expected. The zoo uses a video transmission and recording system from Bosch Security Systems to transmit TV-quality live images of the cub to a pair of 46-inch (1,200 mm) large-format screens. This system, which includes one screen outside the enclosure, was implemented to help the zoo meet the demands of visitors wanting to catch a glimpse of Flocke.

Shortly after her debut, however, Flocke became the focus of controversy when prominent animal conservationist Jürgen Ortmüller, chairman of the Whale and Dolphin Protection Forum, hired a lawyer to stop Nuremberg Zoo's exploitation of the polar bear cub. Claiming that Flocke's public exposure would have damaging effects and that the zoo was only concerned about earning money, Ortmüller recruited high-profile lawyer Rolf Bossi to challenge them in court.

== Merchandising and branding ==
Soon after Flocke was rescued in January, the city secured branding rights to her name. An official logo was subsequently released by the zoo. Flocke became part of a major publicity campaign in Nuremberg when she was depicted along with the phrase "Knut war gestern" (Knut is yesterday's bear) on posters for the city's metropolitan region. These posters were displayed at numerous bus and train stops all over the city.

Dubbed "Flocke fever" by the press (similar to the "Knutmania" from the previous year), the cub's popularity soared in early 2008. Her image has been used for games, diaries, soft toys, DVDs, postcards and other items. The first product released, a Flocke-based board game that was released in February, was made by the Fuerth-based firm Noris-Spiele, a unit of Georg Reulein GmbH & Co. KG. The well-known toy company Steiff began selling a variety of Flocke stuffed animals the following May. The income from the merchandise is currently going towards the zoo and to species survival programs.

== Later publicity ==
In April 2008, the zoo decreased human interaction with the cub, hoping that one day she could coexist with members of her species and not be dependent on humans. Becoming more independent from her keepers, Flocke was reported often playing happily on her own. She was given a plastic "dummy", similar to a child's teething ring, tied to the bars on the inside of her stable door to suckle on while resting. This suckling caused the cub's nose to appear bent; her muzzle remained in this shape for some time before returning to normal.

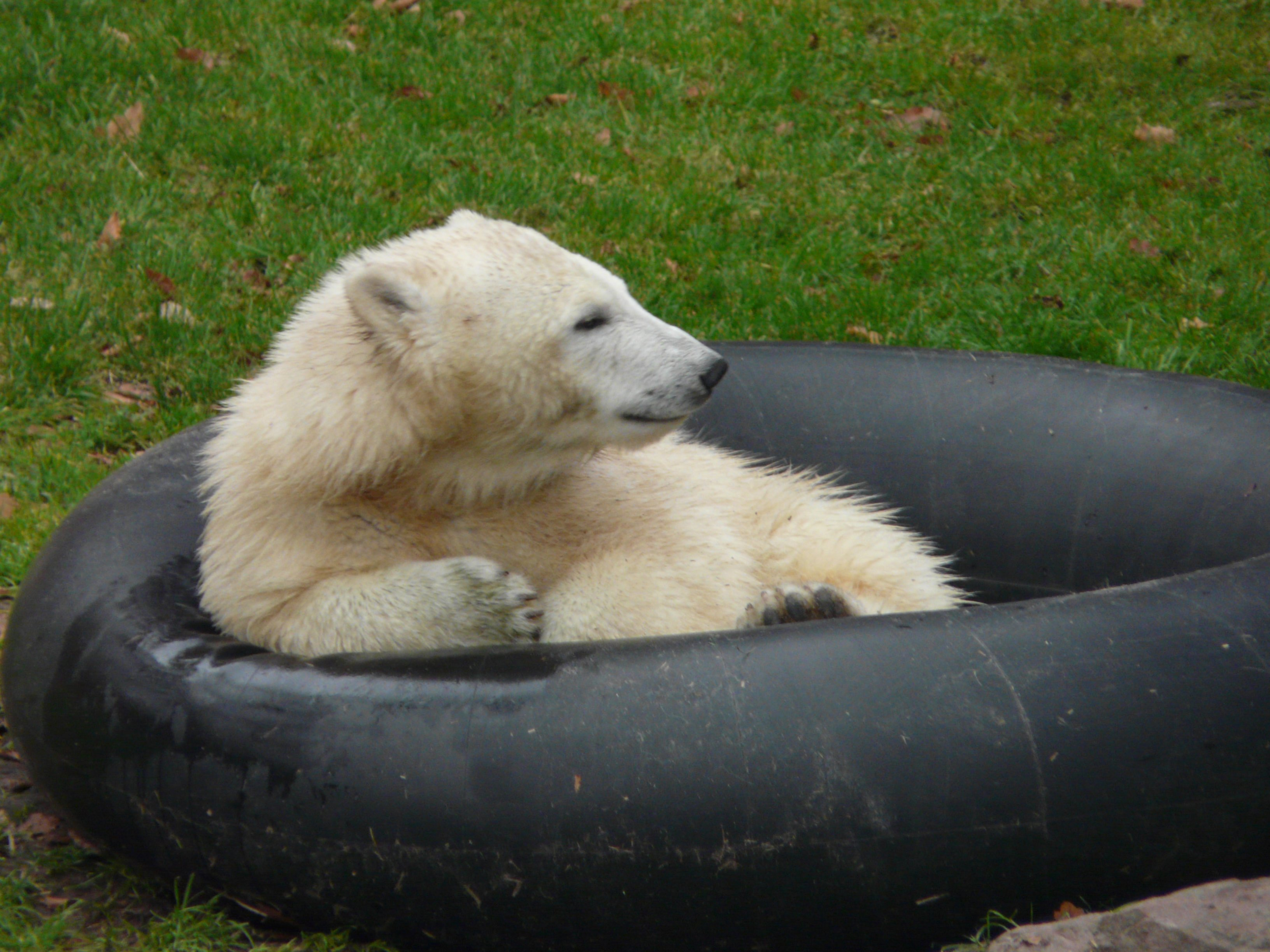
Flocke in her enclosure in October 2008

At the age of six months, it was reported that Flocke, whose diet at the time consisted mostly of a kilogram of beef, assorted vegetables and a liter of puppy milk a day, was at the correct weight for her development at 45 kilograms (99 lb). The zoo's vet, Bernhard Neurohr, also remarked upon the bear's sweet tooth, stating that "Flocke is very enthusiastic about grapes, melon, kiwi fruit and pears", with a particular fondness for bananas.

United Nations Environment Program chief Achim Steiner became Flocke's official patron in May 2008. By assuming this role, Steiner acknowledged Nuremberg Zoo's efforts towards local climate protection, stating "I am happy to have been asked to become 'godfather' to Nuremberg's polar bear cub Flocke. I sincerely hope that during her lifetime we will be able to implement a global green economy."

In June 2008, a new poster campaign featuring Flocke was announced; its goal was strengthening public awareness of individuals' ability to protect Earth's climate. Sponsored by the Nuremberg Zoo in conjunction with the Nuremberg Metropolitan Region, the poster showed Flocke and the phrase "Klimaschutz beginnt vor Ort" ("Climate Protection Begins at Home"). The zoo also published a pocket-sized brochure featuring Flocke. Entitled "Little Guide to Climate Protection", it taught visitors how to decrease their carbon dioxide emissions. The Nuremberg Zoo announced in September that it had reached its one millionth visitor for 2008—two months earlier than last year. Although ticket sales for the year increased due to Flocke's popularity, the numbers did not match high expectations. The same month it was announced that the cub, now weighing 60 kilograms (130 lb), would no longer have lunchtime breaks in her stable, and would remain in the enclosure throughout the day.

== Rasputin and move to France ==
In late November 2008, Flocke's mother Vera gave birth to two cubs, who were fathered by Flocke's father, Felix. Although Vera was able to care for the new cubs without assistance from zoo keepers, Director Dag Encke initially stated that the cubs had a 50 percent chance of survival. Three weeks after their birth was reported, both cubs died of natural causes within one week of each other. Encke expressed regret after the second cub's death, stating that "Vera nursed regularly and the young animal always slept well afterwards, so it seemed certain that it received enough milk. The reason that the young animal wasted away so quickly is not known."

A male polar bear cub named Rasputin was relocated from Moscow to the Nuremberg Zoo in December 2008 for what was thought to be an extended stay before his permanent move to the Zoo Aquarium de Madrid. Originally meant to remain in Germany for only a year, the male bear—called "Raspi" by fans—shared Flocke's enclosure. The zoo hoped that Rasputin, who unlike Flocke was raised by his mother, would teach their celebrity bear how to interact with those of her own species. According to a statement given by the city, the bears "get along famously".

On 21 October 2009, the city of Nuremberg announced that Flocke and Rasputin would move together to a newly constructed enclosure at Marineland, located in Antibes, France, at the beginning of 2010. Due to the close relationship between the two adolescent bears, officials from the European Conservation Breeding Program (Europäischen Erhaltungszucht-Programms, or "EEP") decided that the two bears should remain together despite earlier plans for Rasputin to relocate to Madrid alone. The enclosure they are vacating in Nuremberg will be utilized by Flocke's parents, Vera and Felix, in the hopes that they will produce more cubs. Despite last minute efforts by the animal right's group PETA to halt the move based on concerns for Flocke and Rasputin's well-being, the two bears arrived safely in France on 22 April 2010.

Flocke gave birth to a cub named Hope in 2014. In 2019 she had triplets, her second litter; Tala (female), Indiana (Indie) (male) & Yuma (male). Transferred to Yorkshire Wildlife Park, UK, 11 June 2021. Flocke lives at Jimmyʼs Farm and Wildlife Park in Ipswich as of 21 March 2023 along with her daughter Tala. Daughter Hope arrived at Jimmy’s Farm, Ipswich, Suffolk, on or about 28 June 2024 and died following a vital dental procedure 10 September 2025.

== See also ==
- List of individual bears
