= Château de la Grange Fort =

Castle in France

Grange Fort
- Les Pradeaux, France

Location
- Coordinates: 45.50915°N 3.284794°E

The Château de la Grange Fort or Château de la Grangefort is a 15th-century French castle located in the commune of Les Pradeaux, near Issoire, in the Puy-de-Dôme département of France.

It dates from the 15th century but has been destroyed and rebuilt several times. Its name indicates its origins as a fortified barn associated with the castle at Nonette, Puy-de-Dôme.

In the 19th century, it was restored and embellished by Viollet-le-Duc. It was converted into a campsite and guest house by Van Bronkhorst, a Dutch family originally from Hengelo (Gelderland), who bought the site in 1985.

== Gallery ==
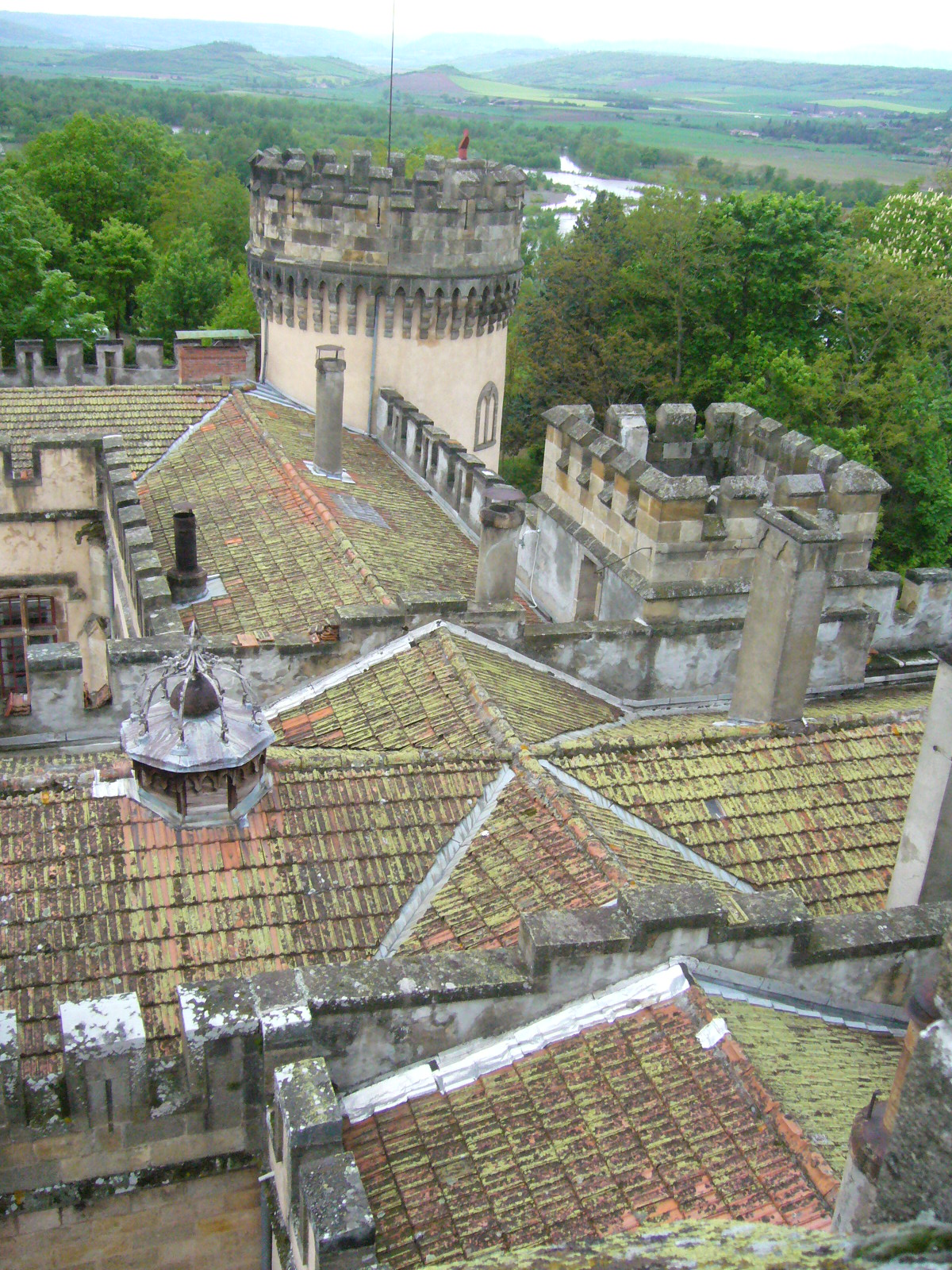

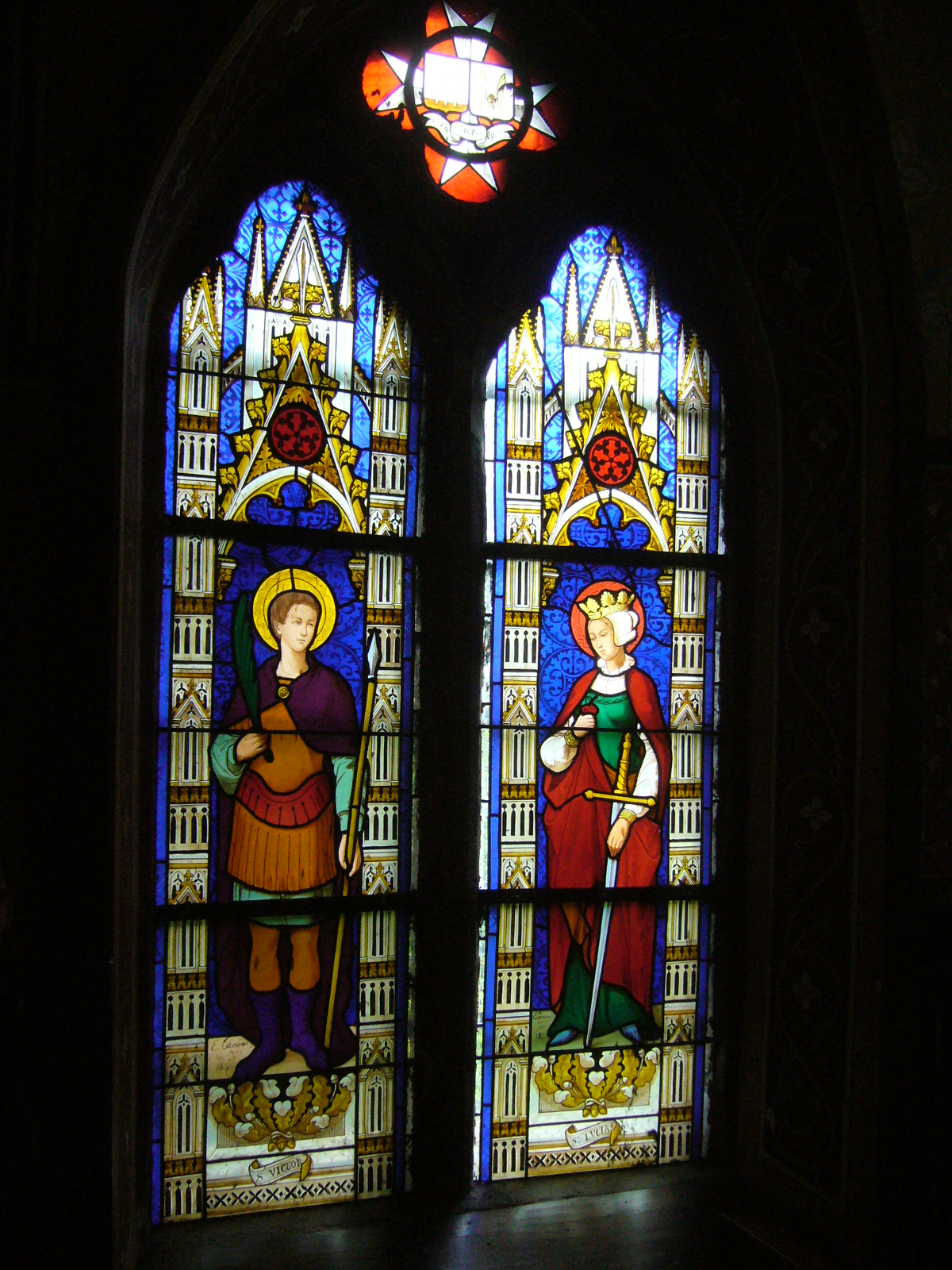

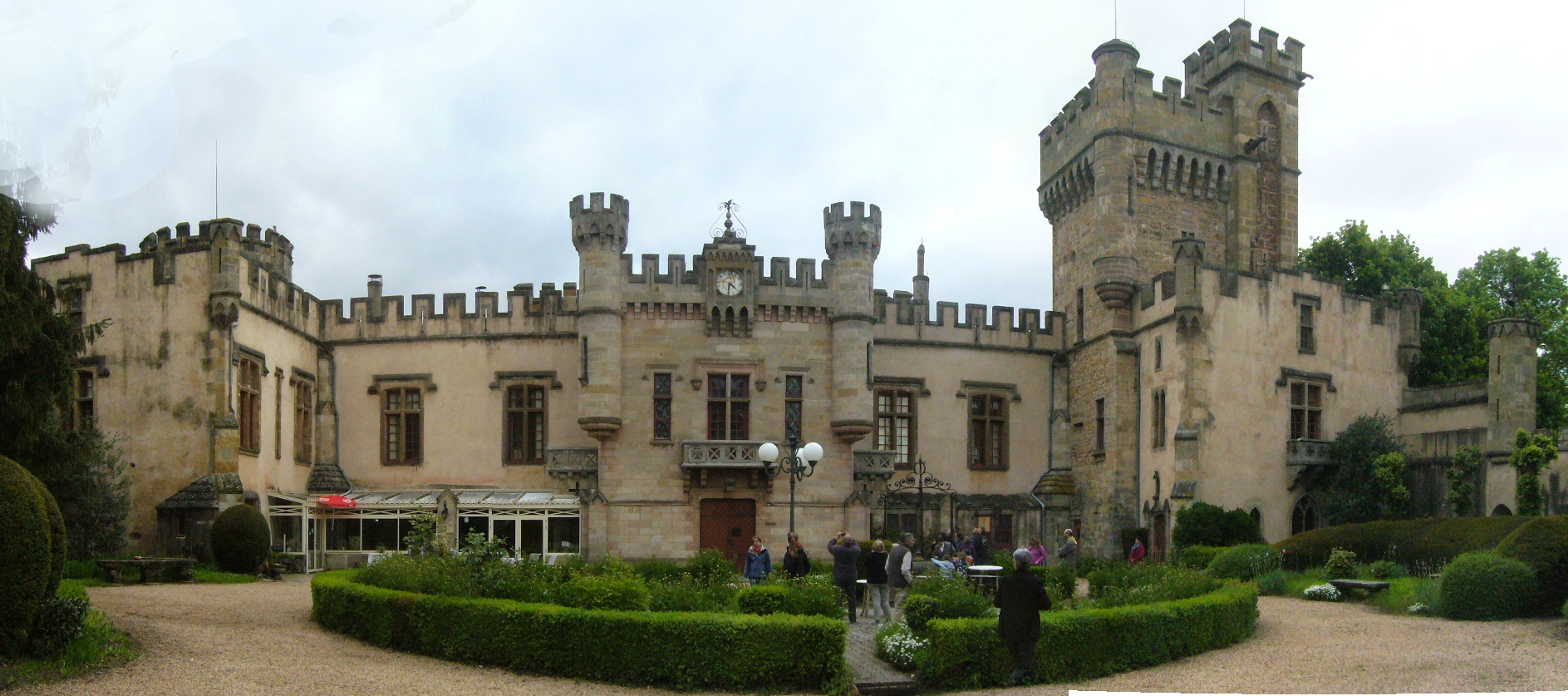

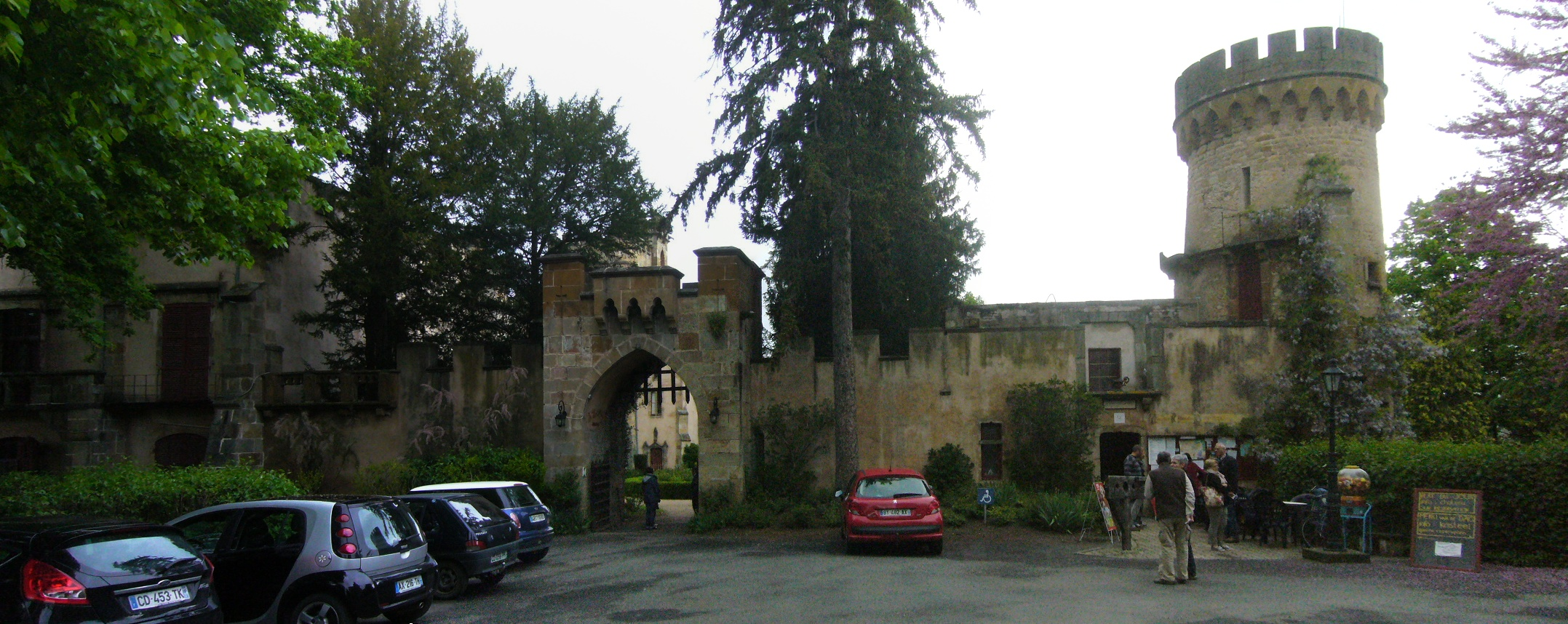

== See also ==
- List of castles in France
