= Marineland of Antibes =

Theme park in France (1970–2025)

Coordinates: 43.6150°N 7.1250°E

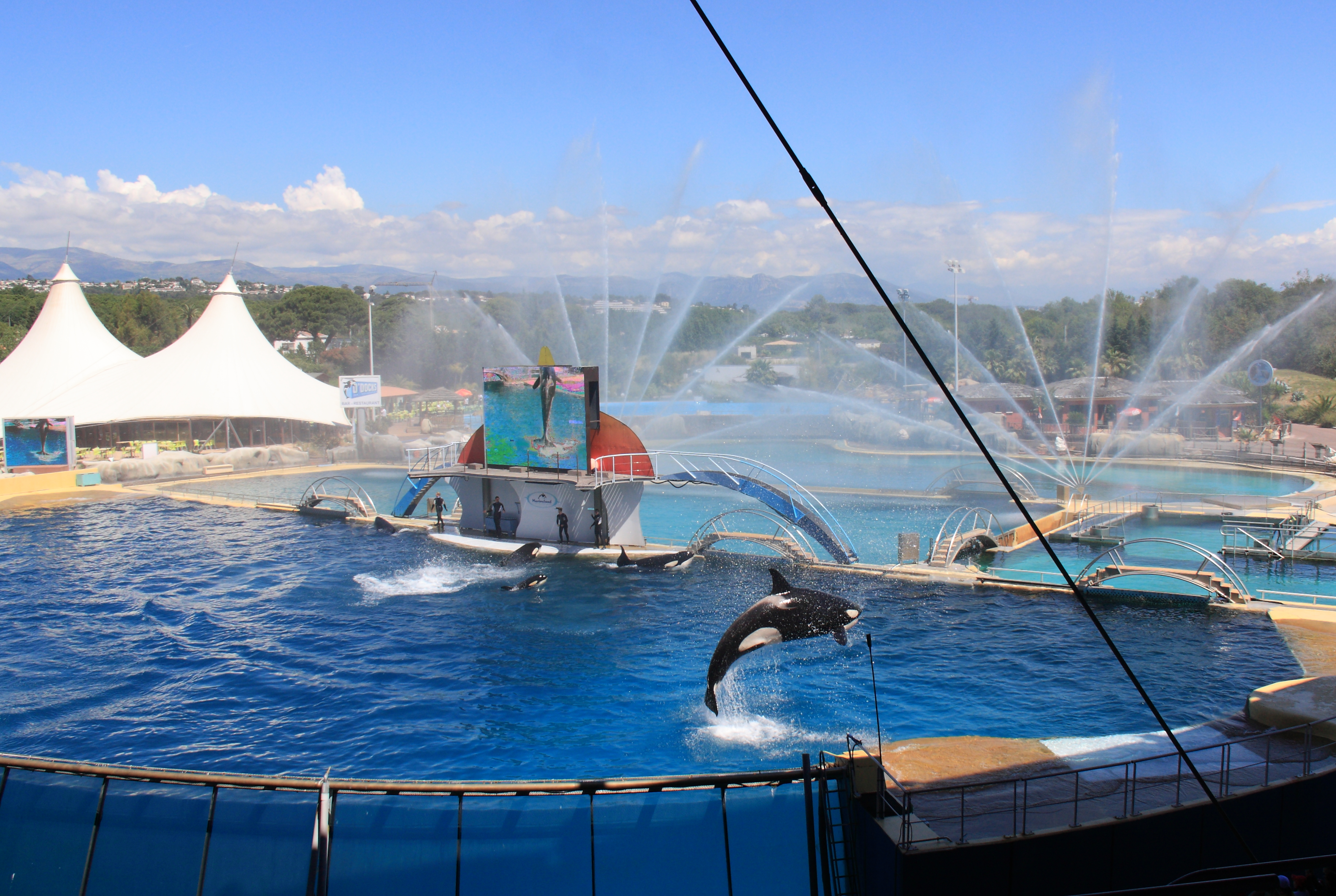
- Global view of the killer whales tanks
- Interactive map of Marineland of Antibes
- Type: Amusement park, dolphinarium, public aquarium, marine zoo
- Location: Antibes, France
- Area: 26 hectares (64 acres)
- Created: 1970
- Closed: 5 January 2025
- Operator: Parques Reunidos

The Marineland of Antibes was a theme park founded in 1970 by Count Roland de La Poype in Antibes (Alpes-Maritimes), in the French Riviera. It included a marine zoological park with dolphinarium, a water park (Aquasplash), a children's play park (Kid's Island), mini golf (Adventure Golf) and a hotel (Marineland Resort). It was property of the Spanish multinational company Parques Reunidos.

It was one of the four French dolphinariums and one of the two European dolphinariums presenting orcas. With over 850,000 visitors in 2018, it was the most visited site in the Provence-Alpes-Côte d'Azur region.

Since 2010, it has been accused of cetacean mistreatment, with the claim that dolphinariums can't assure proper and healthy captivity conditions for that species.

Following a 2021 law banning marine mammal performances as of 2026, Marineland of Antibes closed permanently on 5 January 2025 due to declining attendance and increased regulation of animal captivity in France. When the facility closed, arrangements were not made for the transfer of the animals and at least 14 animals, including mother and son orcas Wikie and Keijo, remain in the facility. Drone footage that has been captured reveals that rust and thick green algae were present in the tank.

The Whale Sanctuary Project in Nova Scotia, which is not yet built, hopes the orcas can find placement there. This solution was previously rejected by the French government, yet the Project made clear in 2024 that they were continuing their efforts in France for Wikie and Keijo.

== History ==
On 25 July 2006, the park was sold to the Spanish amusement park group Parques Reunidos for about €75 million.

In October 2015, a fatal case of severe flooding and inclement weather conditions hit Antibes, killing Valentin, a 19-year old male orca born within the park. The park was deluged with mud, also killing sharks, sea lions and turtles, because it was left without electricity to pump in clean water.

== Notable exhibits and shows ==
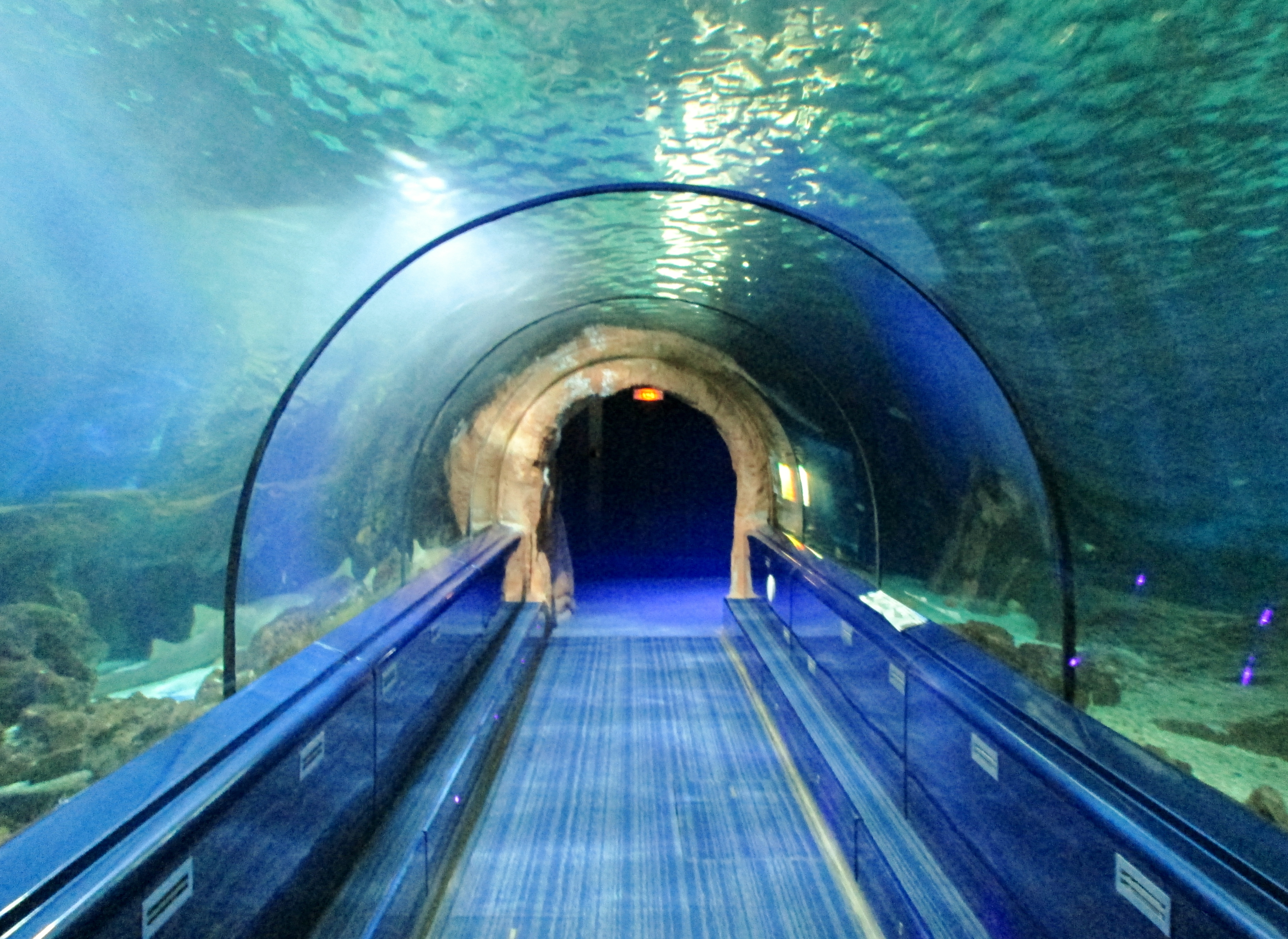
The Shark Tunnel

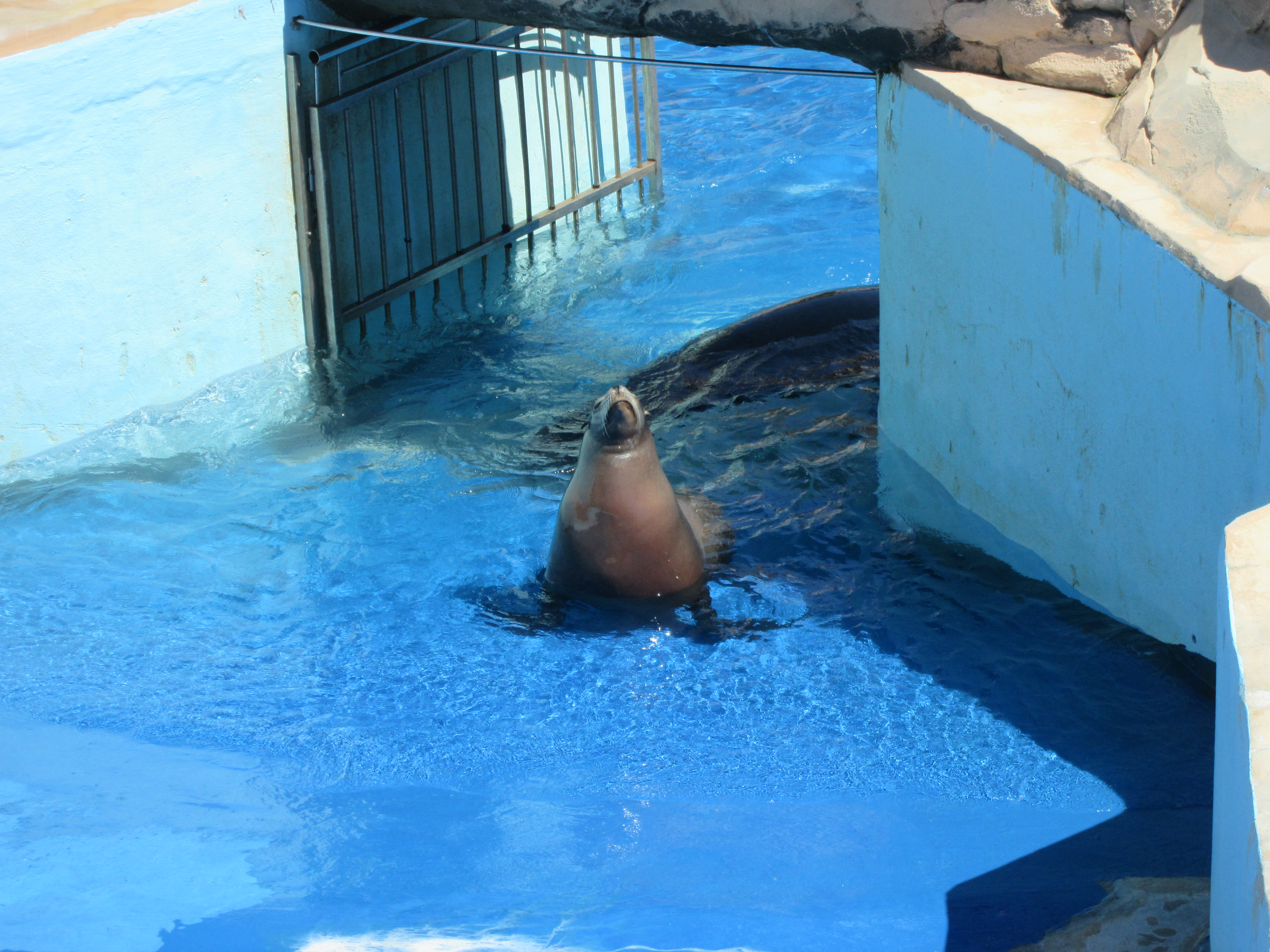
California sea lion housed in the park

=== Orca Show ===
Once the largest Orca pool complex in Europe, with a capacity of 11,000,000 US gallons (42,000 m^{3}) of water and a panoramic glass wall 64 metres (210 ft) long. Marineland holds two orcas: Wikie and Keijo. The two orcas were supposed to be transported to Japan in 2024 but French NGO One Voice obtained that the court prohibit Marineland from relocating the orcas before the end of the independent assessment.

=== Dolphin show ===
As of April 2020, Marineland housed a total of 12 bottlenose dolphins. The names of the dolphins are: Malou (F), Sharky (F), Rocky (M), Dam (M), Neo (M), Nala (F), Tux (M), Ania (F), Jo (F), Kai (M), Luà (F), and Ollie (F).

=== Les Coulisses de l'apprentissage (sea lion show) ===
A live demonstration of the training techniques used with all the mammals in the park, in which the seal and sea lion trainers disclose some of the "ropes" for preparing the show, to better understand the basis of the relationship between humans and animals.

=== The shark tunnel ===
In a 30-metre (98 ft) tunnel through an aquarium containing nearly 2,000,000 litres (530,000 US gal) of water, visitors are surrounded by sharks and stingrays.

=== Polar bears ===
On 11 June 2021, polar bears Flocke, Indiana, Tala, and Yuma are no longer housed within Mainland, France, having been moved to Yorkshire Wildlife Park.

== Activities ==
=== Encounters ===
==== Dolphin ====
Guests could spend 20 minutes wading in the dolphin tank while learning more about the animals as taught by trainers.

==== Orca ====
Guests could spend 25 minutes interacting with orcas at "Orca Fjord" through a large panoramic window, with the aid and education from trainers.

==== Sea Lion ====
Guests could spend 20 minutes with sea lions in a private area and two trainers.

==== Sharks ====
Guests could obtain a diving suit and helmet to swim with sharks in the Shark Tunnel.

== Gallery ==
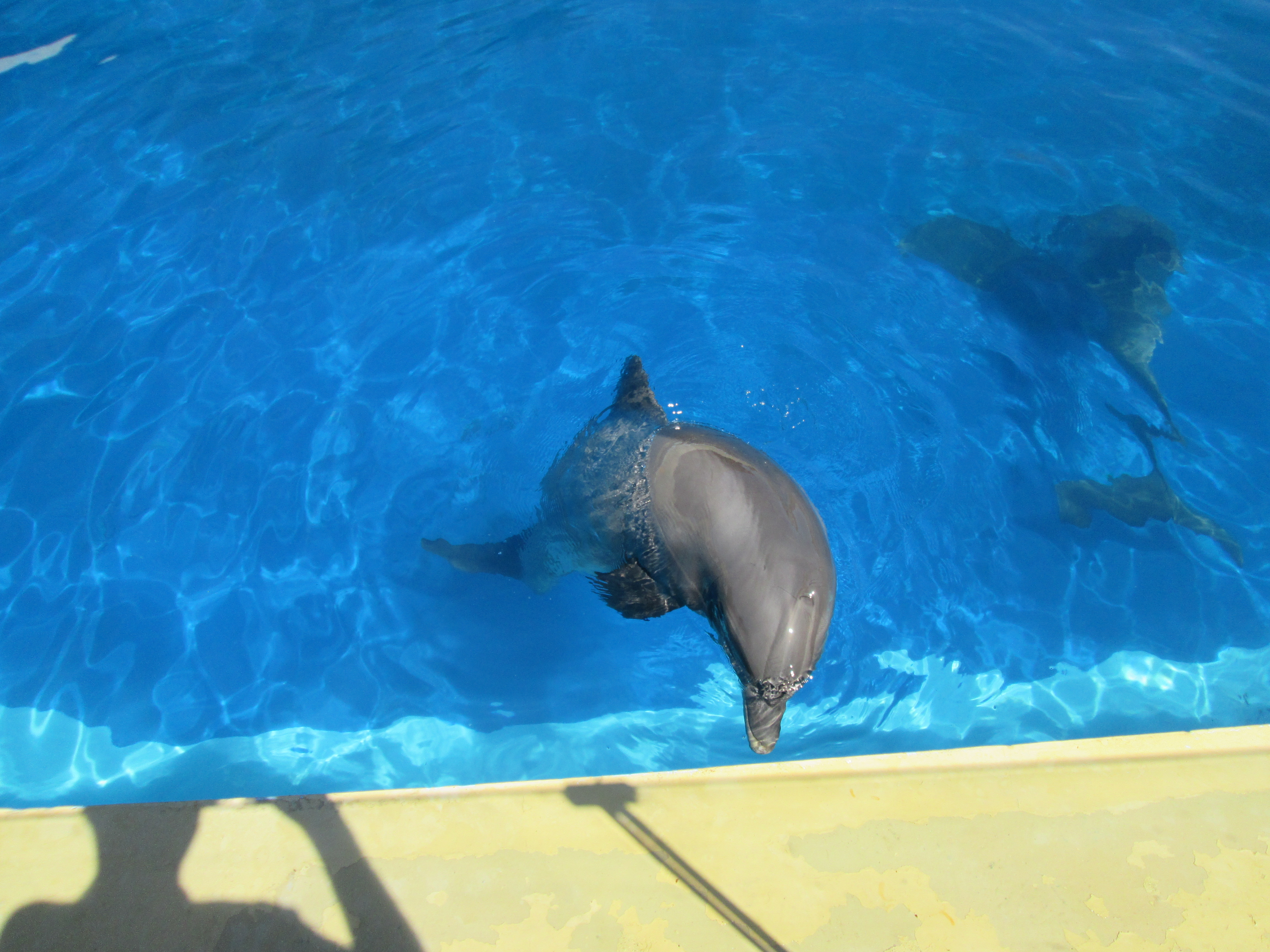
Dolphin

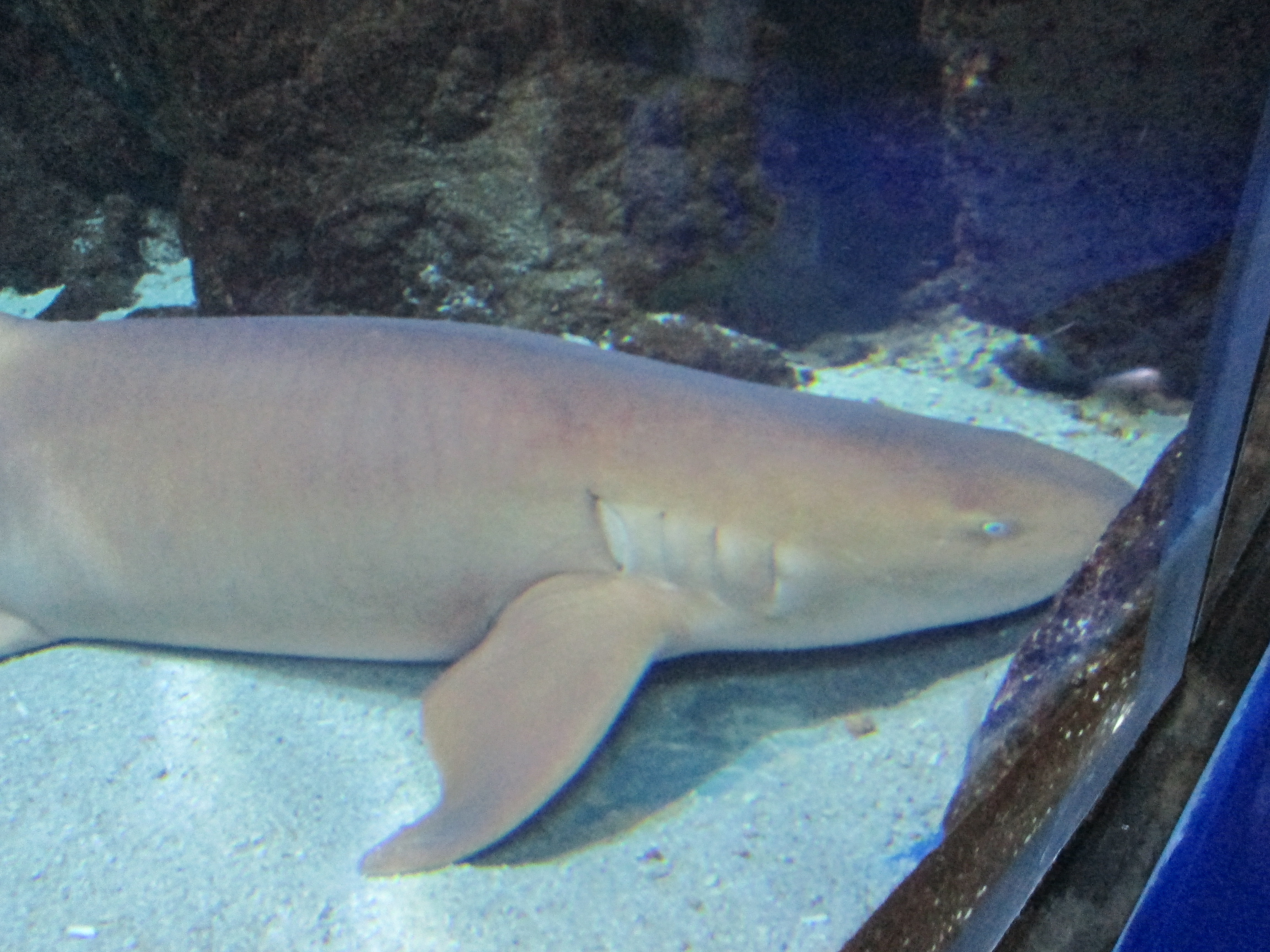
Nurse shark

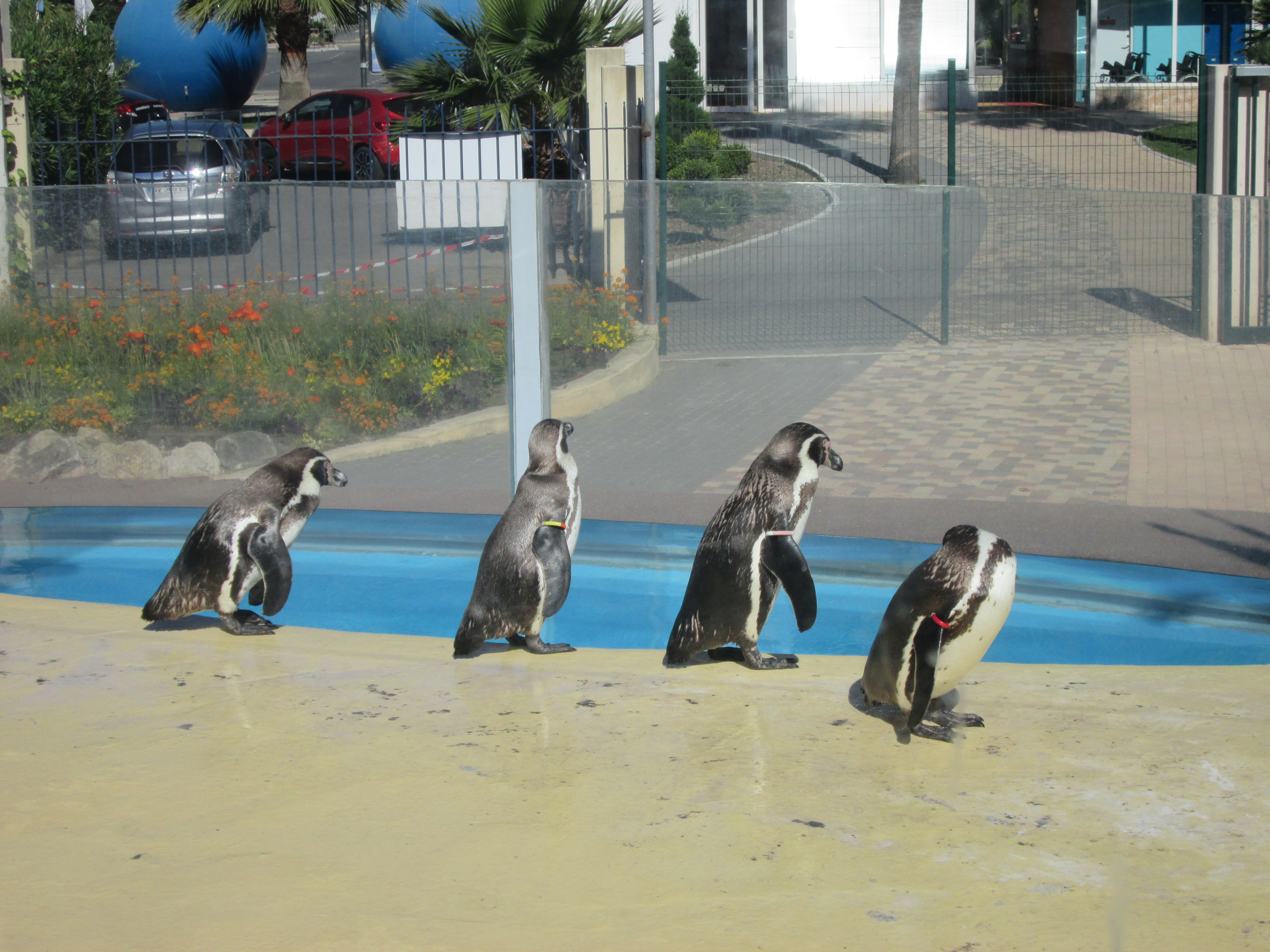
Humboldt penguins

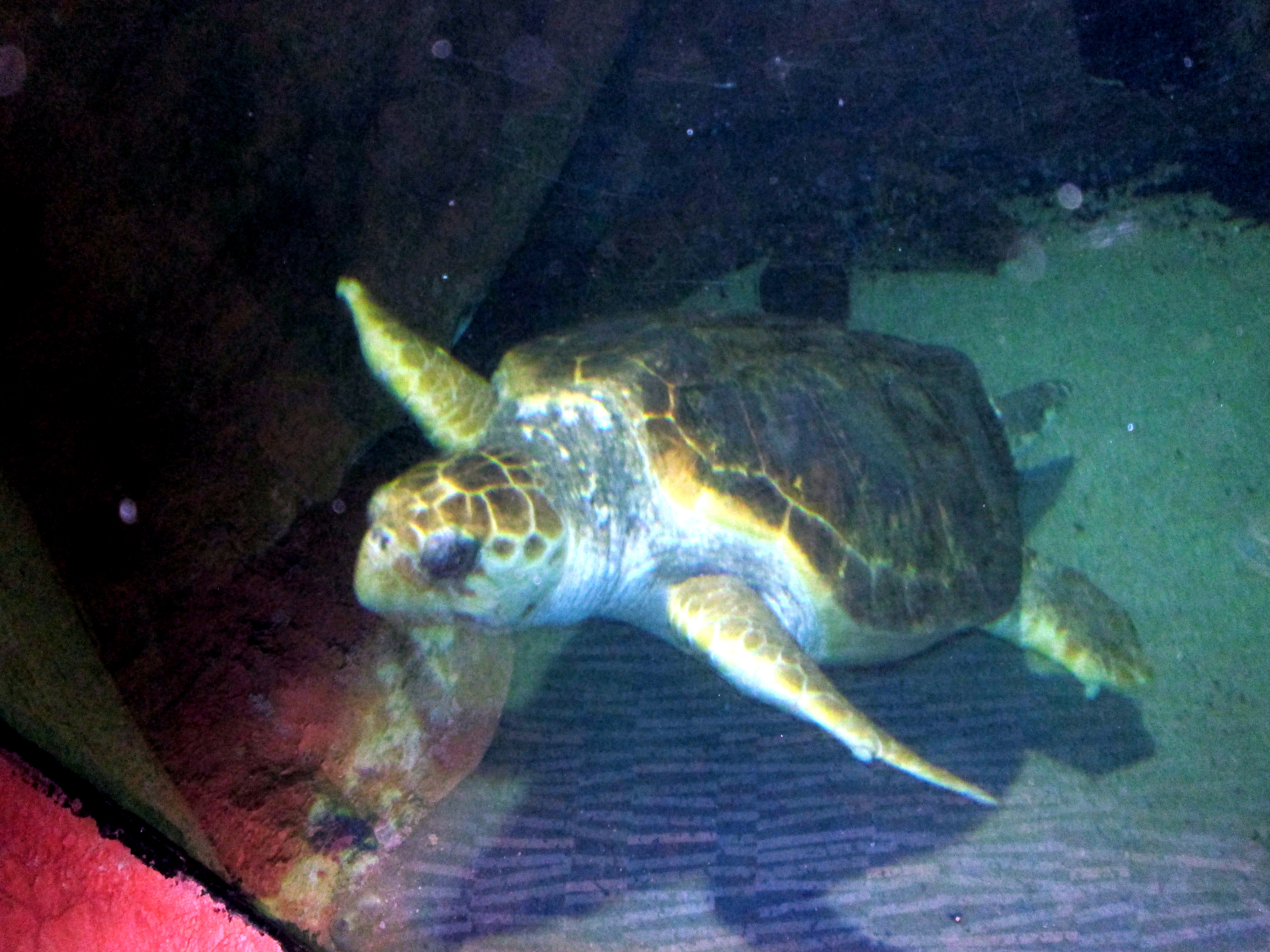
Loggerhead sea turtle

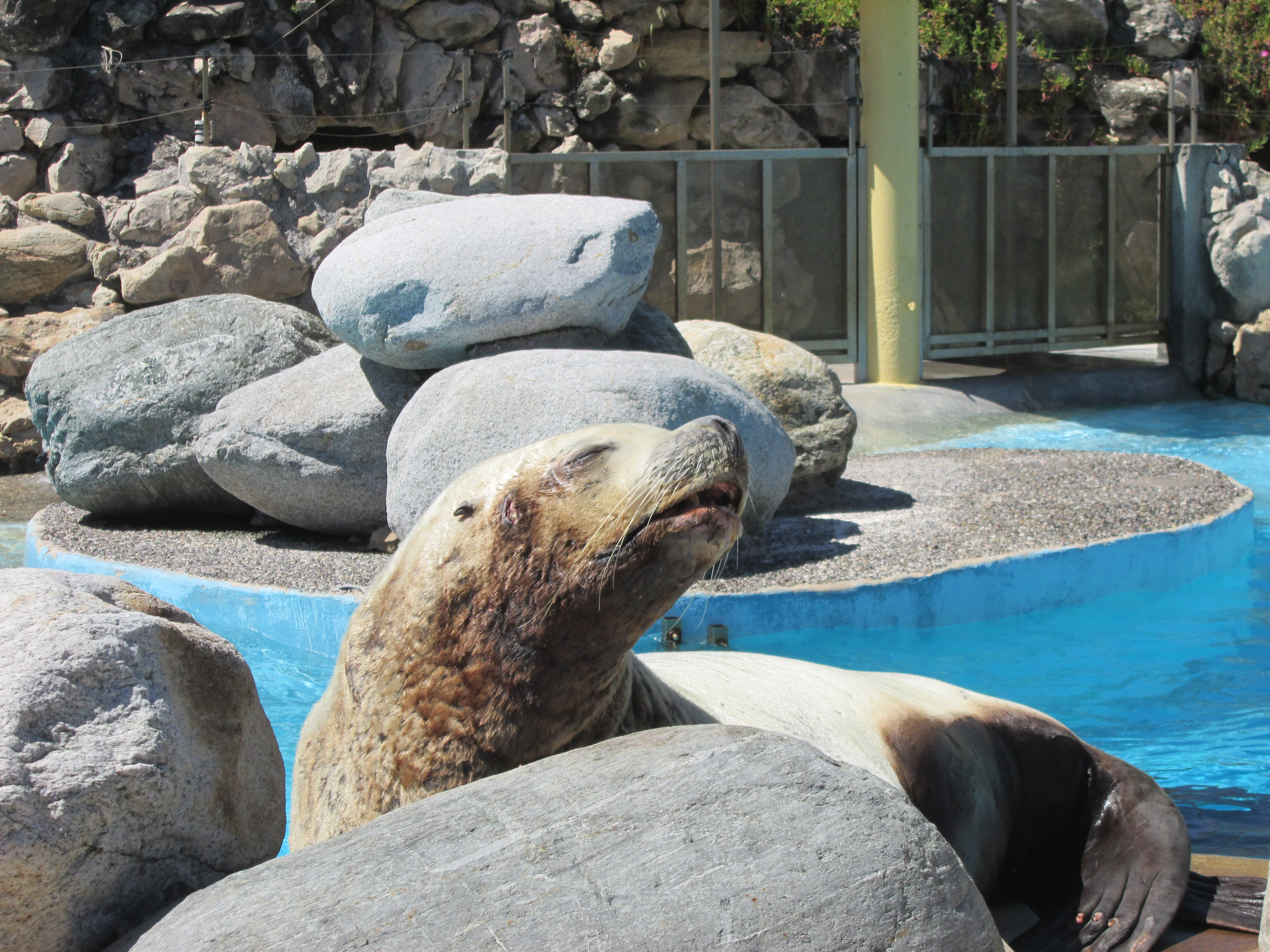
Steller sea lion

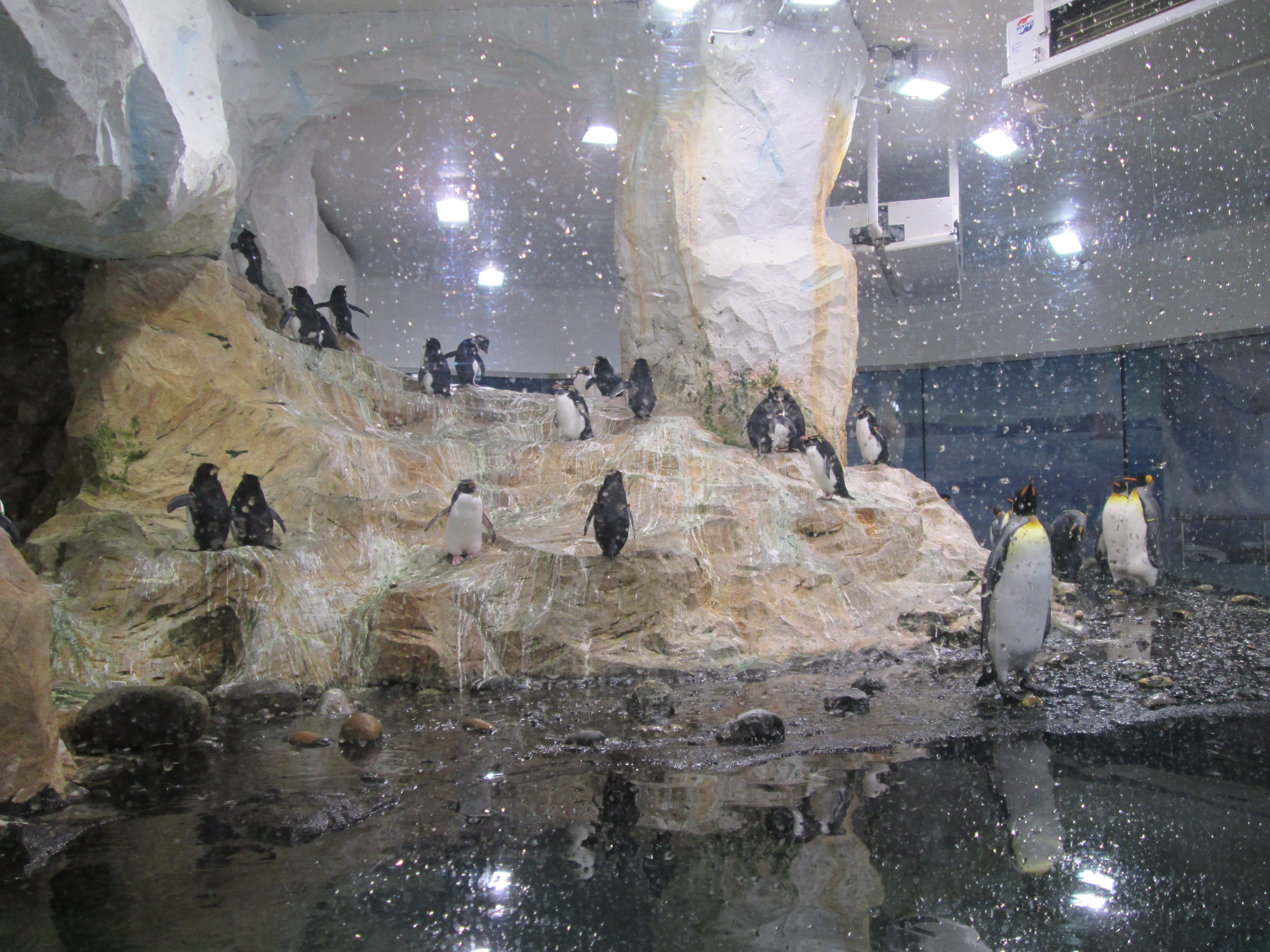
Antarctica Zone with king penguins, southern rockhopper penguins, gentoo penguins and macaroni penguins

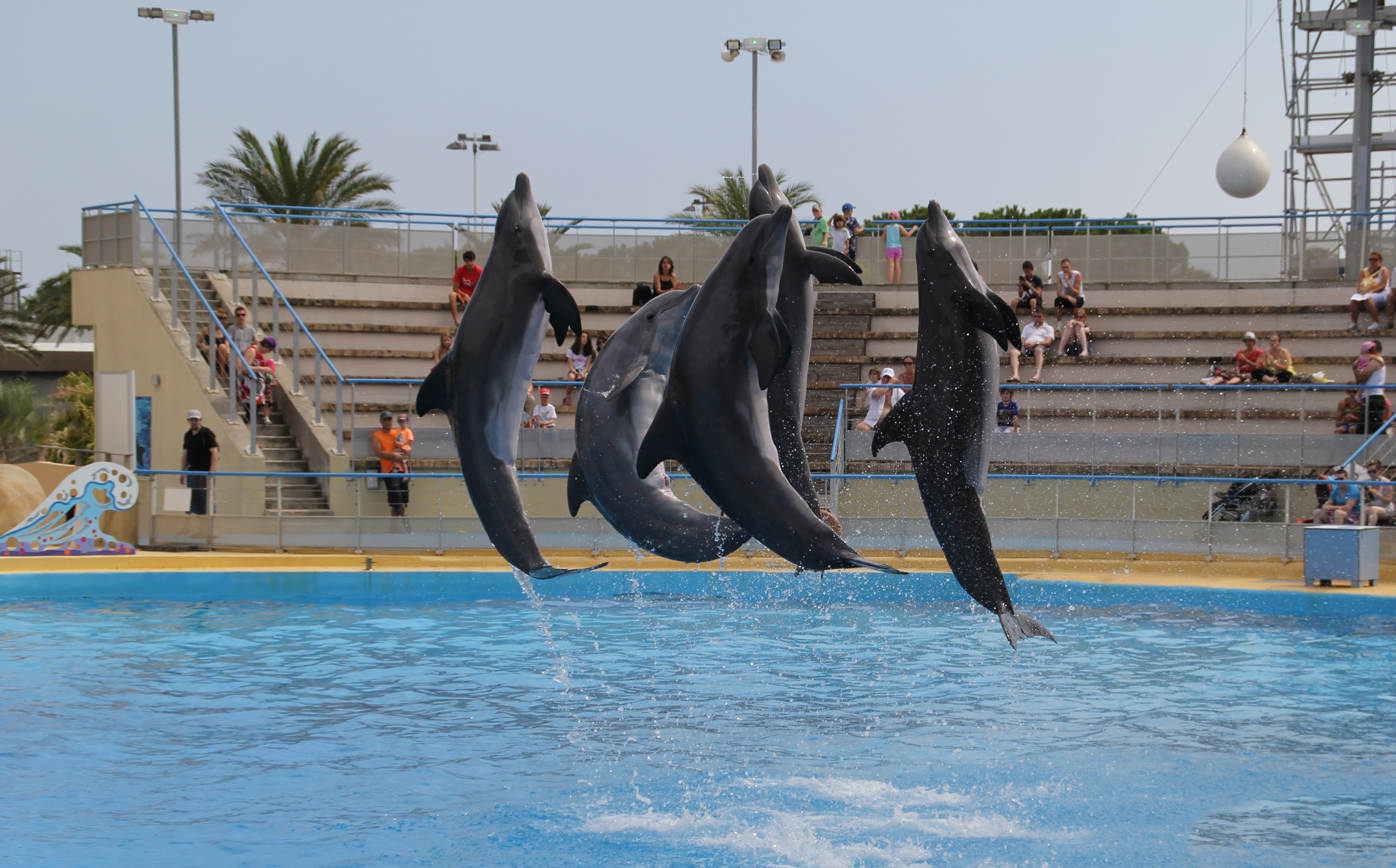
Dolphin show
