= Wikie =

Female orca (born 2001)

- Species: Orca
- Breed: Icelandic
- Sex: Female
- Born: 1 June 2001 (age 25); Marineland of Antibes, Antibes, France
- Years active: 2001–present
- Known for: Mimicking human speech
- Parents: Kim II (father) (1981–2005); Sharkane (mother) (1985–2009)
- Mate: Valentin (half–brother) (1996–2015)
- Offspring: Moana (son) (2011–2023); Keijo (son) (born 2013)
- Weight: 2,041 kg (4,500 lb)
- Height: 17 ft 1 in (5.21 m)

Wikie (born 1 June 2001) is a female orca who lives at the Marineland of Antibes in Antibes, France. Her mother was Sharkane (1985 – 3 January 2009) and her father was Kim II (1981 – 23 November 2005). Her elder sister is Shouka (born 25 February 1993), her elder brother was Inouk (23 February 1999 – 28 March 2024) and her elder son was Moana (16 March 2011 – 18 October 2023).

In 2009, Wikie was artificially inseminated with semen from Ulises, a male orca who currently lives at SeaWorld San Diego in California. The artificial insemination resulted in the birth of her first calf, a male named "Moana" on 16 March 2011. Moana was the first orca to be born through artificial insemination in Europe. Wikie gave birth to her second calf, a male named Keijo on 20 November 2013. Keijo's father was Wikie's half-brother Valentin (13 February 1996 – 12 October 2015).

After the park’s closure in January 2025, Wikie and her son Keijo remained in captivity amid efforts to relocate them to a seaside sanctuary to improve their welfare. According to video footage released in May 2025, the orcas were confined in pools overrun with green algae and sludge, signalling severe neglect and decaying conditions at the abandoned facility. However, park officials maintained that the algae is seasonal and harmless, and that roughly 50 employees continue to care for the animals’ basic needs. Animal-welfare groups such as TideBreakers have urged the French government and park owners to act immediately, as relocation attempts to other facilities in Japan and Spain have so far failed. Despite mounting public pressure, no definitive timeline or approved destination for their transfer has yet been confirmed as of November 2025.

== Communication with humans ==
It was reported in January 2018, through the Proceedings of the Royal Society, that researchers from Universidad Católica de Chile, Universidad Compluense de Madrid and St. Andrews, working at the Marineland of Antibes, had successfully taught Wikie to mimic human words such as 'hello', 'bye bye' and 'Amy' (her instructor), as well as count to three, through using her blowhole. Wikie is thought to be the world's first orca to ever mimic human speech.

Following the announcement of Wikie's ability to mimic human language, the People for the Ethical Treatment of Animals (PETA) and Humane Society International called for Wikie to be released from captivity.

== See also ==
- List of captive orcas
- List of individual cetaceans
