= Lenina, Volgograd Oblast =

Lenina Ленина
- Settlement
- Location within Volgograd Oblast Location within Russia
- Coordinates: 47°37′N 43°15′E
- Country: Russia
- Region: Volgograd Oblast
- District: Kotelnikovsky District
- Time zone: UTC+4:00

Lenina (Russian: Ленина) is a rural locality (a settlement) and the administrative center of Kotelnikovskoye Rural Settlement, Kotelnikovsky District, Volgograd Oblast, Russia. The population was 464 as of 2010. There are 9 streets.

== Geography ==
Lenina is located on the left bank of the Aksay Kurmoyarsky, 11 km east of Kotelnikovo (the district's administrative centre) by road. Karaichev is the nearest rural locality.
