= Yorkshire Wildlife Park =

Wildlife park in South Yorkshire, England

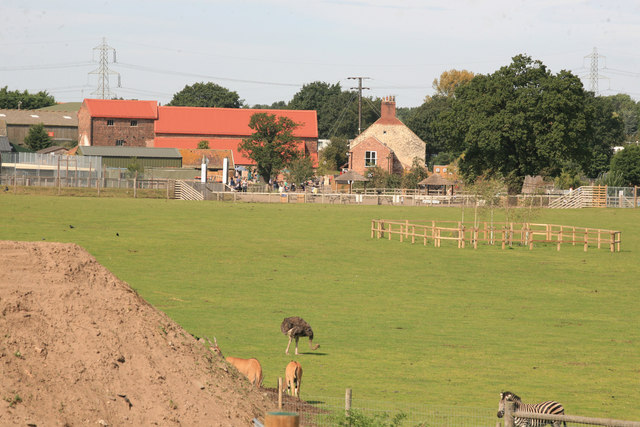
- Yorkshire Wildlife Park
- Interactive map of Yorkshire Wildlife Park
- 53.5047°N 1.0417°W
- Date opened: April 2009
- Location: Branton and Auckley, South Yorkshire, England
- Land area: 260 acres (110 ha)
- No. of animals: Approximately 475
- No. of species: Over 60
- Annual visitors: 678,000 (2015)
- Memberships: BIAZA, EAZA
- Major exhibits: Into Africa, Lion Country, Land of the Tiger, Leopard Heights, Project Polar
- Website: www.yorkshirewildlifepark.com

The Yorkshire Wildlife Park is a zoo, wildlife conservation and rehabilition centre and tourist attraction located in Branton and Auckley, South Yorkshire, England. It opened in 2009 on the site of Brockholes Farm, a former riding school and petting zoo, and features 500 animals of 100 species. Yorkshire Wildlife Park is an official member of the British and Irish Association of Zoos and Aquariums (BIAZA) and the European Association of Zoos and Aquaria (EAZA).

== History ==
The Yorkshire Wildlife Park was built on land formerly occupied by the 260-acre (110 ha) Brockholes Farm Visitor Centre and Riding School, and currently occupies about 100 acres (40 ha) of the site.

Cheryl Williams, Neville Williams, John Minion and Stephen Minion purchased the site in 2008 with funding from Lloyds TSB Commercial, private investment, and a Yorkshire Forward grant. The site was renovated over the 2008–2009 winter, and officially opened by Justin Fletcher on 4 April 2009. That year, it had 66,000 visitors.

In February 2010, the park rescued 13 lions from a Romanian zoo and, after their quarantine period, released them into the newly built 10-acre (4.0 ha) Lion Country enclosure.

In 2011, the park's annual visitors had grown to 323,000. That year, Land of the Tigers was opened, which contains two pools and a waterfall and was created next to a wetland reserve. Visitors view the tigers from a 150-metre-long (490 ft) raised walkway, with the tiger enclosure on one side of the walkway and the wetlands on the other.

In March 2012, the park opened Leopard Heights, a £300,000 open-topped enclosure that lets visitors view the Amur leopards from an eight-metre (26 ft) viewing tower or from ground level through a 10-metre-long (33 ft) glass wall. The 6,000-square-metre (65,000 sq ft) enclosure is claimed to be the largest leopard enclosure in the world.

In July 2014, the park opened a large enclosure for polar bears, named Project Polar, with the first bear being 500-kilogram (1,100 lb) male Victor. A second – Victor's grandson Pixel – arrived in March 2015.

On 15 April 2015, the park announced that one of its Amur tigers had given birth to three cubs on 29 March 2015.

On 10 October 2026, William Chapman, aged 23, entered an enclosure and was fatally attacked by Altai, a male Amur tiger. The zoo enacted safety and evacuation procedures, and later announced that Altai would not be euthanised. An inquest heard that Chapman was diagnosed with schizophrenia and had a history of psychotic episodes.

== Animals and exhibits ==
=== The Yorkshire Hive ===
In 2021, the park opened its new entrance to the east of the zoo. "The Yorkshire Hive", a new entrance area provides a modern entrance to the park. Guest facilities include a larger car park, retail, dining, coffee shops and ticket centre. The Yorkshire Hive is free to enter.

In 2022, the park added a new restaurant, and an overnight hotel, servicing the park and the nearby Doncaster Sheffield Airport.

=== Atlantic Forest ===
The park opened Atlantic Forest in April 2021. The area is themed around the Amazon lowlands and houses several animals from South America, including bush dogs, maned wolves and lowland tapirs.

=== Lion Country ===
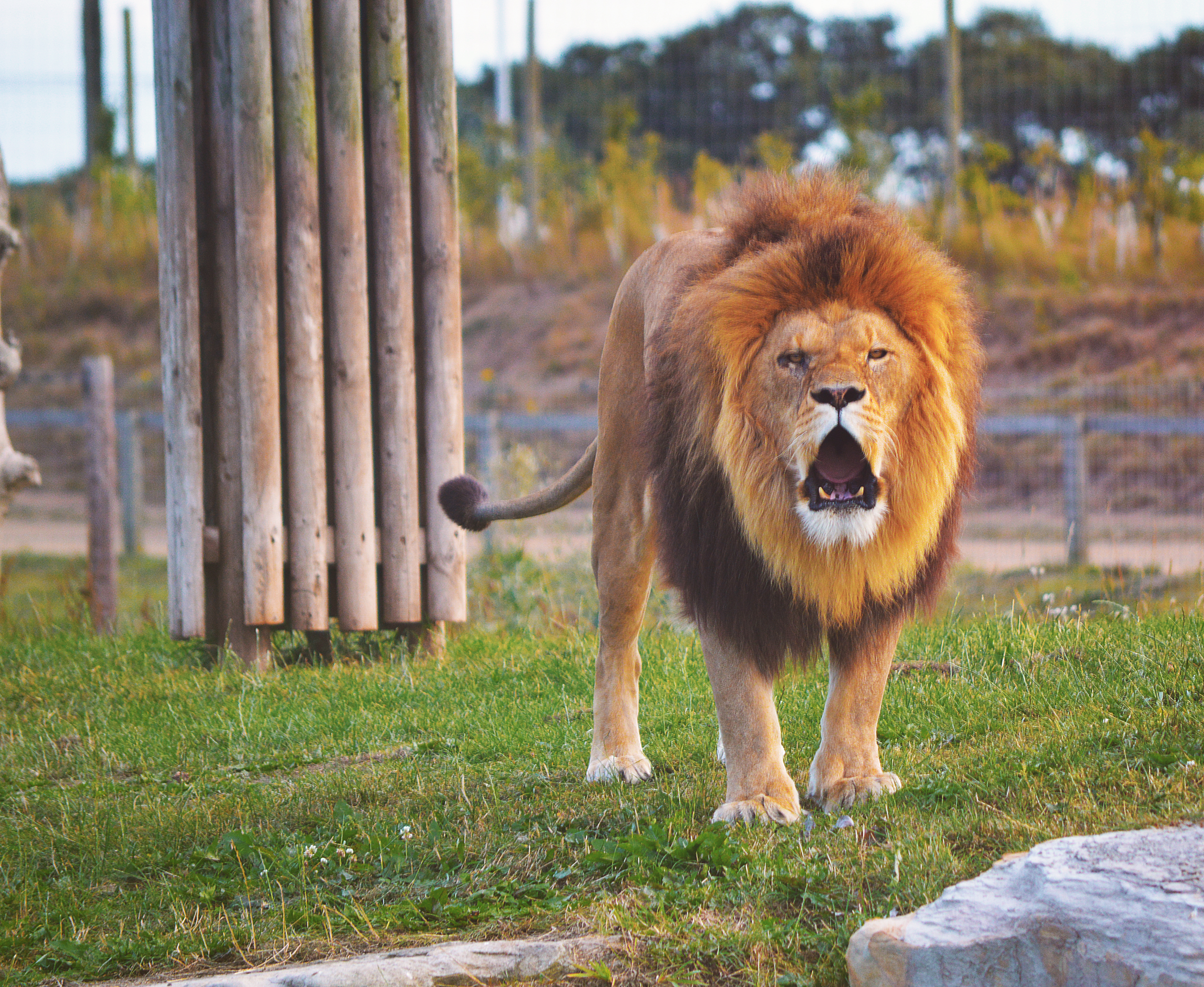
A male lion at the park

Lion Country was opened in May 2010 to house 13 African lions, which were acquired from Oradea Zoological Garden in Romania in February 2010. The lions had been kept in small enclosures and poor living conditions, and were in poor health as the Romanian zoo could not adequately care for them. As of October 2022, there were five lions in Lion Country: Simba, Carla, Crystal, Julie and Ares. Simba died at the age of 14 in October 2023. The park is set to rescue a lioness and her three cubs from Ukraine.

=== Lemur Woods ===
Lemur Woods is a walk-through enclosure with many trees, housing groups of crowned, ring-tailed, and red-bellied lemurs.

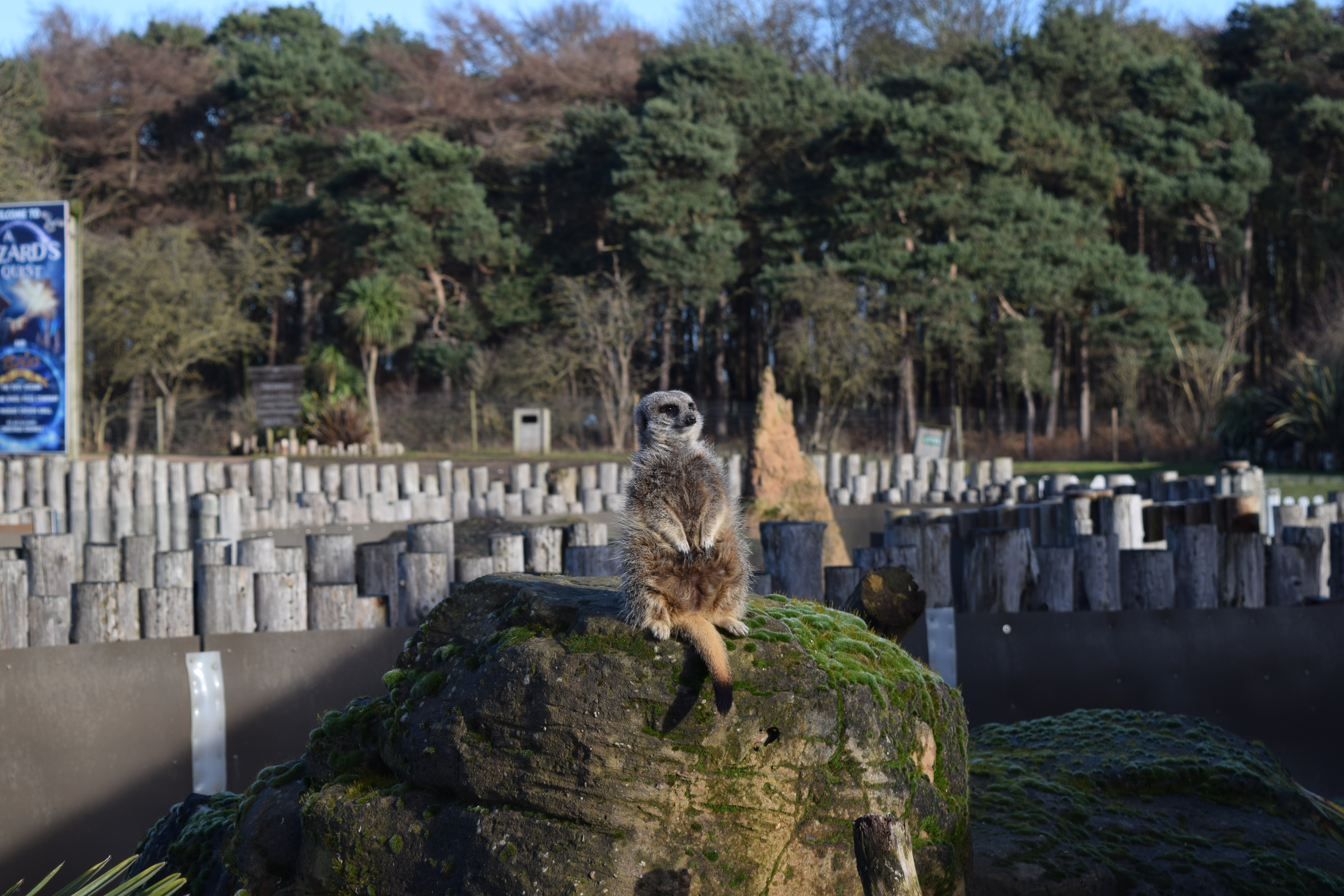
Yorkshire Wildlife Park – "Meerkat Manor" enclosure.

=== Meerkat Manor ===
Located close to the old entrance to the park, this small exhibit houses the zoo's meerkats. The enclosure features rock formations purpose-built to replicate South African terrain.

=== Into Africa ===
The centrepiece of the Into Africa zone is African Plains, a large multi-species paddock themed around the African savannah. Species in the enclosure include a bachelor group of giraffes, Kafue lechwes, Grévy's zebras and common elands.

The giraffe group have a separate paddock for the winter months, with regular access to the much larger savannah-themed exhibit. The park has three giraffes, Jengo and Palle, both of the Reticulated subspecies and Jambo, of the Rothschild's subspecies.

Opposite is an enclosure for critically endangered black rhinoceroses. Themed around the scrublands of East Africa, the enclosure has space for two rhinos and features several mud wallows and a large, open grassland space.

=== Land of the Tigers ===
Land of the Tigers houses two Amur tigers – Sayan and Tschuna. The enclosure features two pools and a waterfall, as well as a 150-metre (490 ft) walkway for visitors. The tigers can often be seen playing together or even climbing trees. One of the zoo's previous tigers, Vladamir, who died in 2021, previously bred in 2016 with Tschuna, to have three cubs – Harley, Hector and Hope. All three cubs have since moved on to other collections in the UK, France and the United States.

=== Project Polar ===
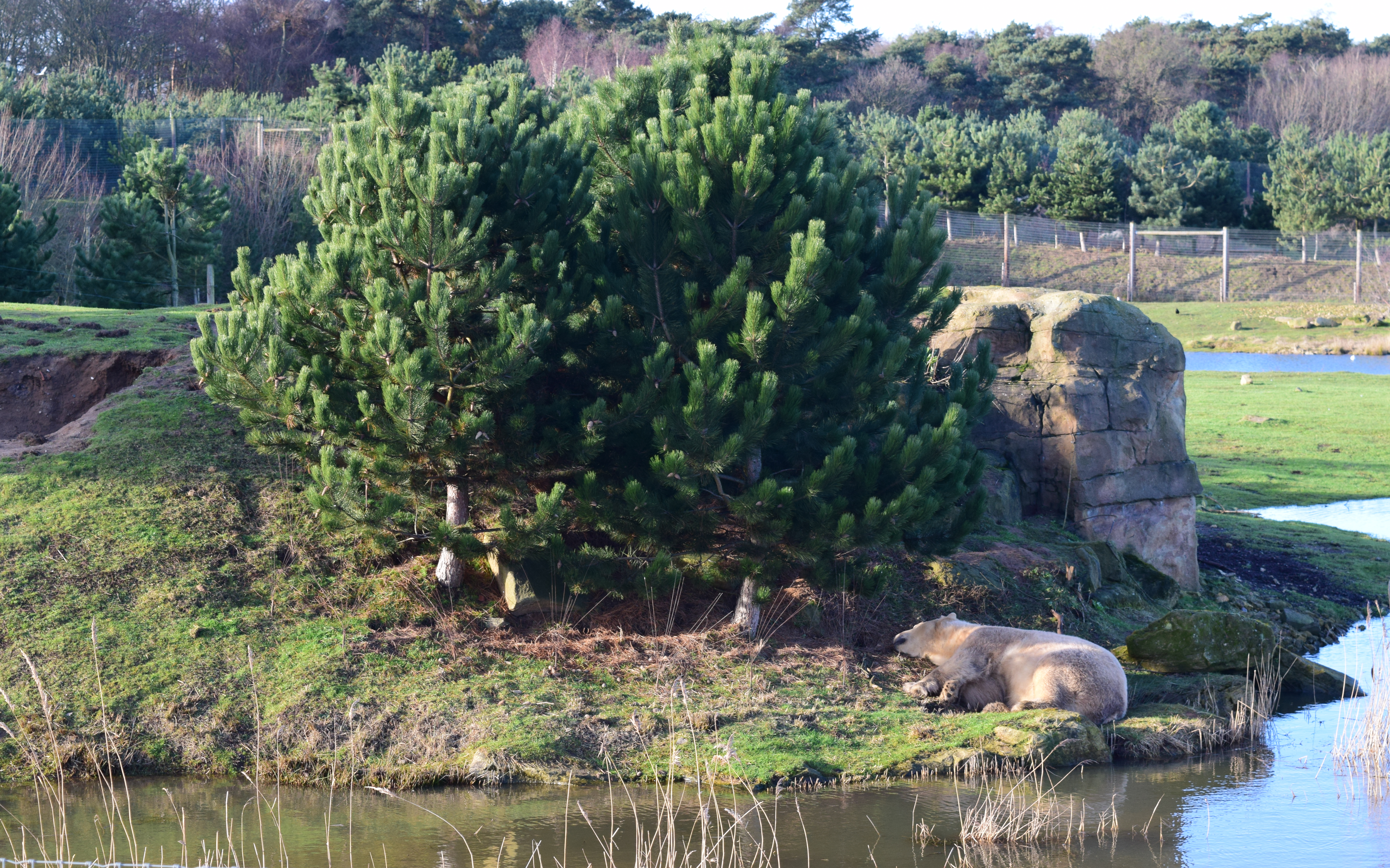
Yorkshire Wildlife Park – "Project Polar" enclosure.

Opened in August 2014, Project Polar houses six male polar bears named Pixel, Nissan, Nobby, Hamish, Indie and Yuma. These were the only polar bears in an English zoo until Peak Wildlife Park announced the arrival of three polar bears in July 2023. The largest enclosure is ten acres in size and features two pools, the largest of which is eight metres (26 ft) deep and contains 25.5 million imperial gallons (116 Ml) of water. This is one of the largest polar bear enclosures in the world.

In 2021, the Rescue and Rehabilitation Centre was converted into a Project Polar 2. The two-part exhibit houses female polar bear Flocke and one of her three cubs, Tala. The other two cubs from Flocke are Indy and Yuma, who have since moved over to the bachelor paddocks. The family arrived from Antibes and bring the number of polar bears at the park to eight – making YWP the largest holder of the species outside of Canada.

=== South America Viva ===
South America Viva is a walk-through enclosure displaying several South American species, including Patagonian maras, white-faced sakis, Azara's agoutis and capybaras. There are also separate enclosures housing six-banded armadillos, Venezuelan red howlers, cotton-top tamarins, giant otters and giant anteaters, which are situated near a South America-themed restaurant called "¡caramba!".

In August 2021, two cotton-top tamarins were born. In early October, a Venezuelan red howler was born, named Pablo.

=== Baboon Reserve ===
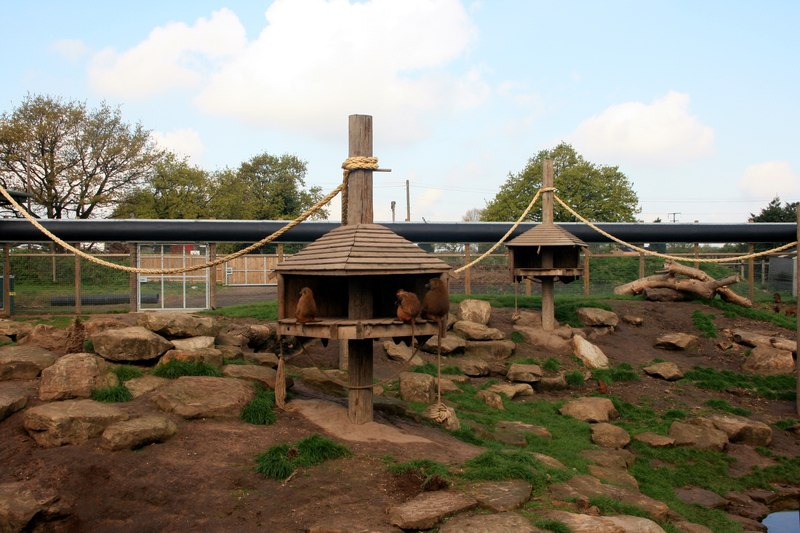
The Baboon Reserve

Opened in Easter 2013, the Baboon Reserve houses a troop of Guinea baboons which came from Edinburgh Zoo.

=== Leopard Heights ===
Leopard Heights houses one Amur leopard, named Drake. In 2021, Drake's breeding partner, Freya, moved on to Tayto Park in Ireland, having previously parented a litter of cubs in June 2015. The enclosure is 6,000 square metres (65,000 sq ft), features climbing frames up to 10 metres (33 ft) tall, and cost £300,000 to build.

=== Experience Ethiopia ===
The first part of Yorkshire Wildlife Park's 2020 expansion to open, Hyenas of Harar is home to a breeding clan of spotted hyenas. The second part to this expansion, Simien Mountains was also opened in 2020. This precinct is themed around the foothills of Ethiopia and is home to a large troop of geladas.

=== Himalayan Pass ===
The third 2020 expansion, Himalayan Pass, has a mountainous theme and includes an exhibit for red pandas and a mixed-species exhibit displaying binturongs and a family of smooth-coated otters.

=== Point Lobos ===
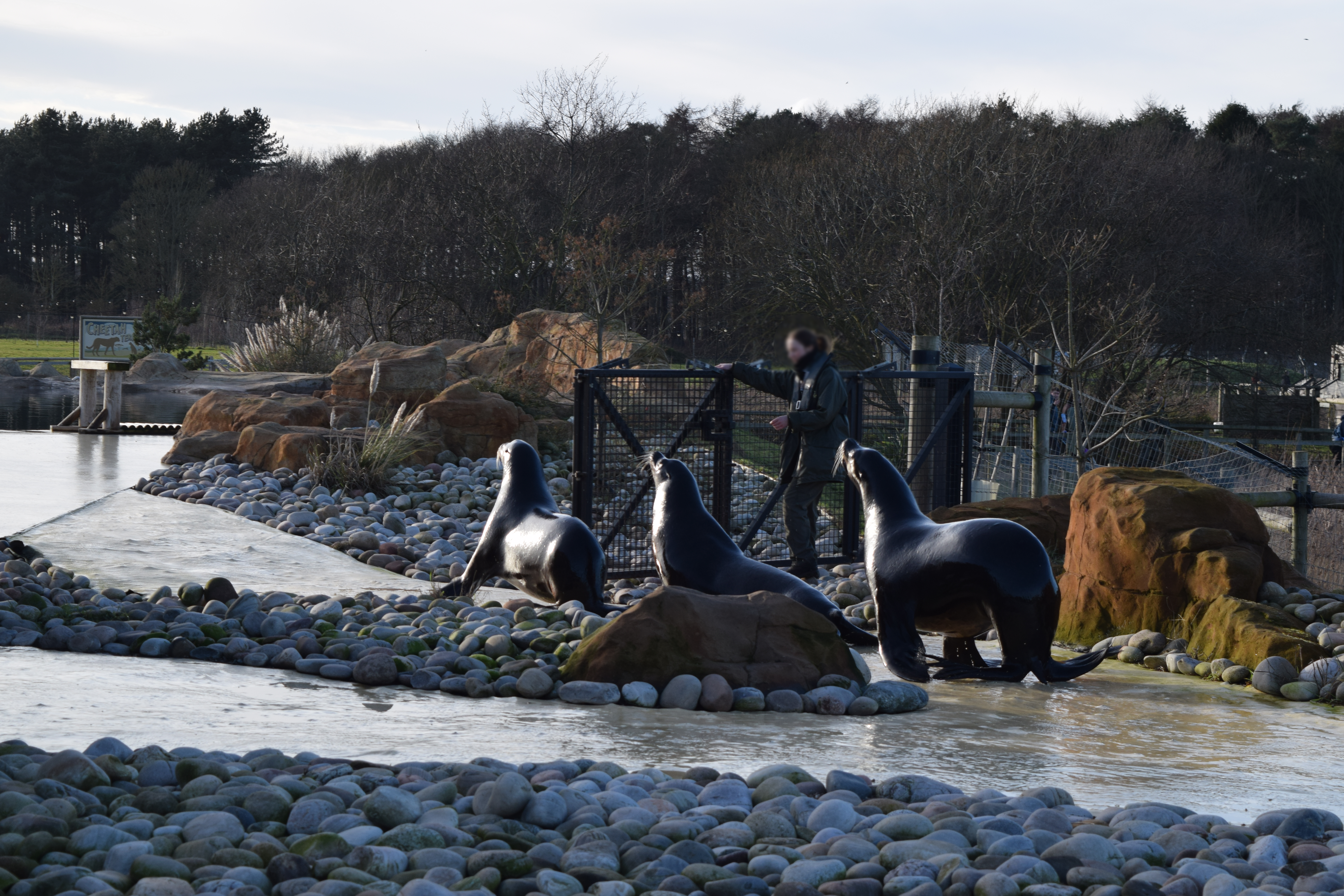
Sea lions at Point Lobos

In May 2021, the park opened the new Point Lobos expansion featuring a family of six California sea lions. The sea lions arrived from ZSL Whipsnade Zoo. The exhibit holds three million litres of water, making it the largest filtered sea lion exhibit in the world. Themed around the titular stretch of Californian coastline, Point Lobos is a two-acre, two-lake reserve with stony beach areas and several small islands. Guests can watch sea lions swimming from raised paths around the lake.

=== Rehabilitation Centre ===
The Rehabilitation Centre is an educational facility to educate visitors on the park's global conservation efforts and rescue work focused on animals in poor conditions in other collections. Over the years, the Centre has exhibited several rescued species in a series of large, temporary exhibits. The rehomed species are often held until they can move elsewhere in the park, or until new homes in other zoos are found.

The first residents were four Ussuri brown bears rescued from a zoo in Japan. However, all four were elderly and in poor health upon their arrival and the last died eighteen months after coming to the park. The next resident was a fifth male polar bear, called Rasputin, who arrived in late 2019. Rasputin moved to a zoo in Estonia early in 2021.

After Rasputin's departure, the Rehabilitation Centre was converted into the second Project Polar reserve, to house Flocke and her cubs, who Rasputin had fathered at their previous zoo. Currently, Flocke and her daughter Tala reside in the second reserve.

=== Other animals ===
Other notable animals in the park's collection include red-necked wallabies, swamp wallabies, African wild dogs, Visayan warty pigs, Bactrian camels, okapis, roloway monkeys, kirk's dik-diks, cheetahs and a colony of African penguins.
