= Les Pradeaux =

- Commune
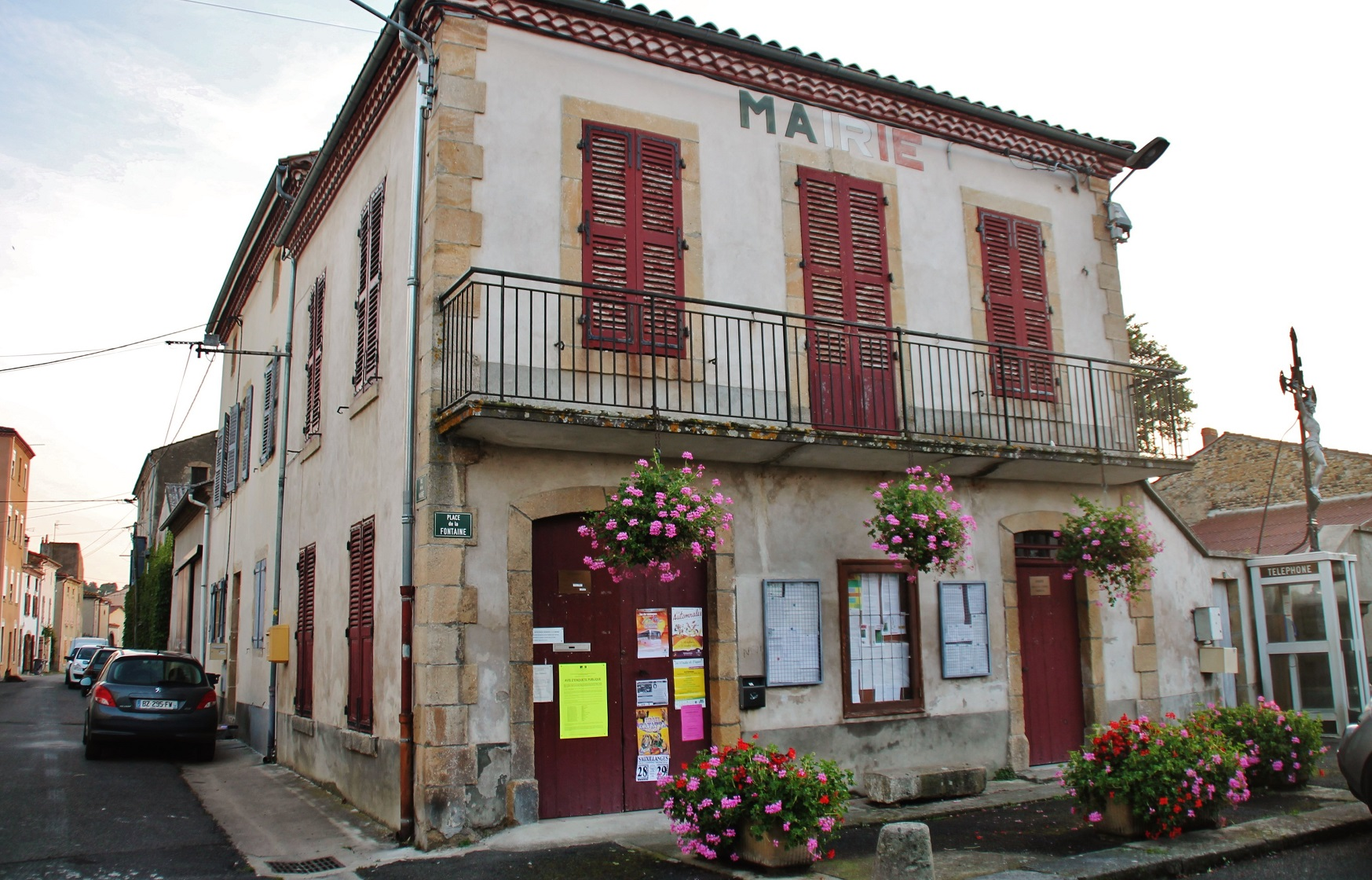
- The town hall in Les Pradeaux
- Location of Les Pradeaux
- Location within France Location within Auvergne-Rhône-Alpes
- Coordinates: 45°30′47″N 3°17′46″E
- Country: France
- Region: Auvergne-Rhône-Alpes
- Department: Puy-de-Dôme
- Arrondissement: Issoire
- Canton: Brassac-les-Mines
- Intercommunality: Agglo Pays d'Issoire

Government
  - Mayor (2020–2026): Marie-Pierre Saux
- Area^{1}: 5.54 km^{2} (2.14 sq mi)
- Highest elevation: 452 m (1,483 ft)
- Lowest elevation: 373 m (1,224 ft)
- Population (2023): 351
  - Density: 63.4/km^{2} (164/sq mi)
- Time zone: UTC+01:00 (CET)
  - Summer (DST): UTC+02:00 (CEST)
- INSEE/Postal code: 63287 /63500
- ^{1} French Land Register data, which excludes lakes, ponds, glaciers > 1 km^{2} (0.386 sq mi or 247 acres) and river estuaries.

Les Pradeaux (French pronunciation: [le pʁado]) is a commune in the Puy-de-Dôme department in Auvergne in central France.

== See also ==
- Communes of the Puy-de-Dôme department
