= Peatland restoration =

Restoration of wetlands

Peatland restoration is a term describing measures to restore the original form and function of peatlands, or wet peat-rich areas. This landscape globally occupies 400 million hectares or 3% of land surface on Earth. Historically, peatlands have been drained for several main reasons; peat extraction, creation of agricultural land, and forestry usage. However, this activity has caused degradation affecting this landscape's structure through damage to habitats, hydrology, nutrients cycle, carbon balance and more.

Due to peat formation, peatlands are carbon-rich and noted as carbon sinks. It has been projected that climate change, such as increased temperature and alterations of precipitation, affecting these landscapes under current status could increase releases of greenhouse gases (GHGs). Climate projections indicate increased probability and intensity of weather events, which can increase risk of fires and additional GHG release. Peatlands home a variety of native flora and fauna put at risk by projected degradation from climatic or anthropogenic alternation, placing emphasis and need for restoration efforts. Policy for restoration is in action. In June 2002, the United Nations Development Programme launched its Wetland and Ecosystem and Tropical Peat Swamp Forest Rehabilitation Project and in November the International Peatland Society formed, which promotes restoration and balance of demands on peatlands.

Map of Global Peatland Distribution, Concentration and Location.

Peatland restoration emphasises the reduction of GHG emissions to slow the effects of climate change. With discussion circulating on human impacts of damage from draining and clearing the landscape. As a result, restoration would involve balancing usage of peatlands for human needs and needs of the natural ecosystems. Presently, main methods of restoration circulate on re-wetting, restoring forestry, localised paludiculture and adaption of anthropogenic usage of peatlands.

== Targets of restoration ==
=== Climate change mitigation and adaptation ===
Book on wetland conservation by the U.S. Dept. of Agriculture. 1994.

Peatlands store carbon from dead plants and hence help mitigate climate change. However, draining and degrading peatlands release large amounts of greenhouse gases. Rewetting and restoring peatlands can significantly reduce these emissions by raising water tables which slower down the plant decomposition. The resulting anaerobic decomposition produces the greenhouse gas methane, but since methane does not remain in the atmosphere as long as other GHGs, the net effect on the climate is likely cooling if a long time frame is considered (decades). The strength of this effect varies between different kinds of peatland, but it is generally most significant in tropical and agricultural peatlands. A raised water table also results in a local direct cooling effect, moist vegetation and soil has a higher thermal conductivity and therefore solar radiation is rather used for evapotranspiration than warming the surface.

=== Water ===
The goals of peatland restoration in hydrological terms are primarily to improve the quality and regulate the quantity of water. A peatland as an intact ecosystem is a natural water purifier, it filters and stores organic substances, metals or other toxic matter and retains nutrients. These pollutants are stored in the peat for long periods of time, improving the quality of drinking water. The concept of peatlands regulating water quantity has often been compared to the way of a "sponge" works, in times of high availability of water (periods of rainfall) it is sucked up and stored and afterwards, in times of less precipitation, slowly released to the environment. Furthermore, as the water level rises, the risk of peat fire decreases.

=== Biodiversity ===
In some instances, peatlands may exhibit a comparatively lower number of species. However, in the same biogeographic zone as dryland ecosystems, peatlands contain a greater percentage of specialized and distinctive species. Due to the isolation and heterogeneity of their habitats, peatlands harbor significant populations of endangered and rare species, many of which are unique to peatland environments, and play a role for the conservation of genetic diversity. Restoration seeks to counteract the process of habitat deterioration, which represents the most significant risk to biodiversity. In drained sites there is a tendency for plant diversity to decrease, with mosses (including Sphagnum) facing difficulties in recolonizing such areas. This could be attributed to the hydrological alterations, as well as the loss of the initial soil characteristics.

== Restoration effects on the natural environment ==
=== Carbon balance ===
Due to the formation of peat developing from partial decomposition of vegetation material, there is a high quantity of carbon within this landscape. As a result, peatlands can be seen as a carbon storage. Carbon fluctuations are dominantly impacted by local hydrology within a peatland.

However, these processes are interrupted by anthropogenic usage of peatlands. Peat extractions cause destabilisation of local ecosystems through physical landscape damage of digging, draining and isolation through habitat fragmentation. As a result of drainage and temperature increase, peatlands are becoming drier, which increases the likelihood of severe fires and the risk of larger carbon dioxide emissions.

=== Climate regulation ===
Climatic regulation is key to monitored for peatland restoration. Due to the water-logged nature of this environment, consistent seasonality and fluctuations, are essential to restoring stability and protecting pristine peatlands. Climatic change of variables, such as precipitation and temperature, threaten significant factors mostly namely that of hydrology (due to its immediate effects on microbial decomposition within the soil).

Beyond climatic events on peatlands, their restoration offers climatic benefits also. Peatland restoration is noted for significantly reducing air temperature compared to neighbouring agricultural land. This finding offers peatland restoration as a positive step to combat climate change.

=== Nutrients ===
Peat in general is poor in nutrients and due to its constantly condition of being waterlogged, it has a limited nutrient cycle. Peatlands that have been degraded and used for agriculture, typically have high nutrient levels. Restoring these areas with surface water, which is also relatively nutrient-rich, leads to nutrient overload. To properly restore these peatlands, excess nutrients must be removed. One expensive but effective way is to remove the top layer before restoration and another option is to use paludiculture to remove nutrients over time. Due to peatlands' special flora and fauna, a failure to remove excess nutrients can result in low biodiversity in affected peatlands. However, a study showed that after the restoration of peatlands, the original concentrations of mineral elements such as potassium and calcium was restored.

=== Hydrology ===
Recent initiatives on peatland restoration showed, that they help preventing and mitigating floodings in specific areas and under specific conditions. This happens within two particular effects. First by sucking up water and second through temporary surface-storage. When peat sucks up water, the groundwater level elevates and captures the rainwater, this is then only released by evapotranspiration, as the water does not flow down the rivers into the sea, but stays in the peatland, it too reduces the probability of droughts. In the temporary surface-storage effect the vegetation acts as a barrier to the water runoff and thus delays it although the netflow of water stays the same, but the time expands and hence the flow rate is reduced. This is a crucial point in flood prevention.

=== Soil regulation ===
Peatland as an ecosystem is important for regulating soil quality. When the peat covering Sphagnum layer is degraded, the remaining bare peat soil releases sediment to water streams, which pollutes and reduces biodiversity of rivers and water reservoirs. Additionally through wind and water erosion carbon can be released if the peat is blank. Hence a dense Sphagnum covering is important for soil regulation, as it can improve the physical, chemical, and biological flows and properties that allow soils to buffer, filter, and transform chemical substances.

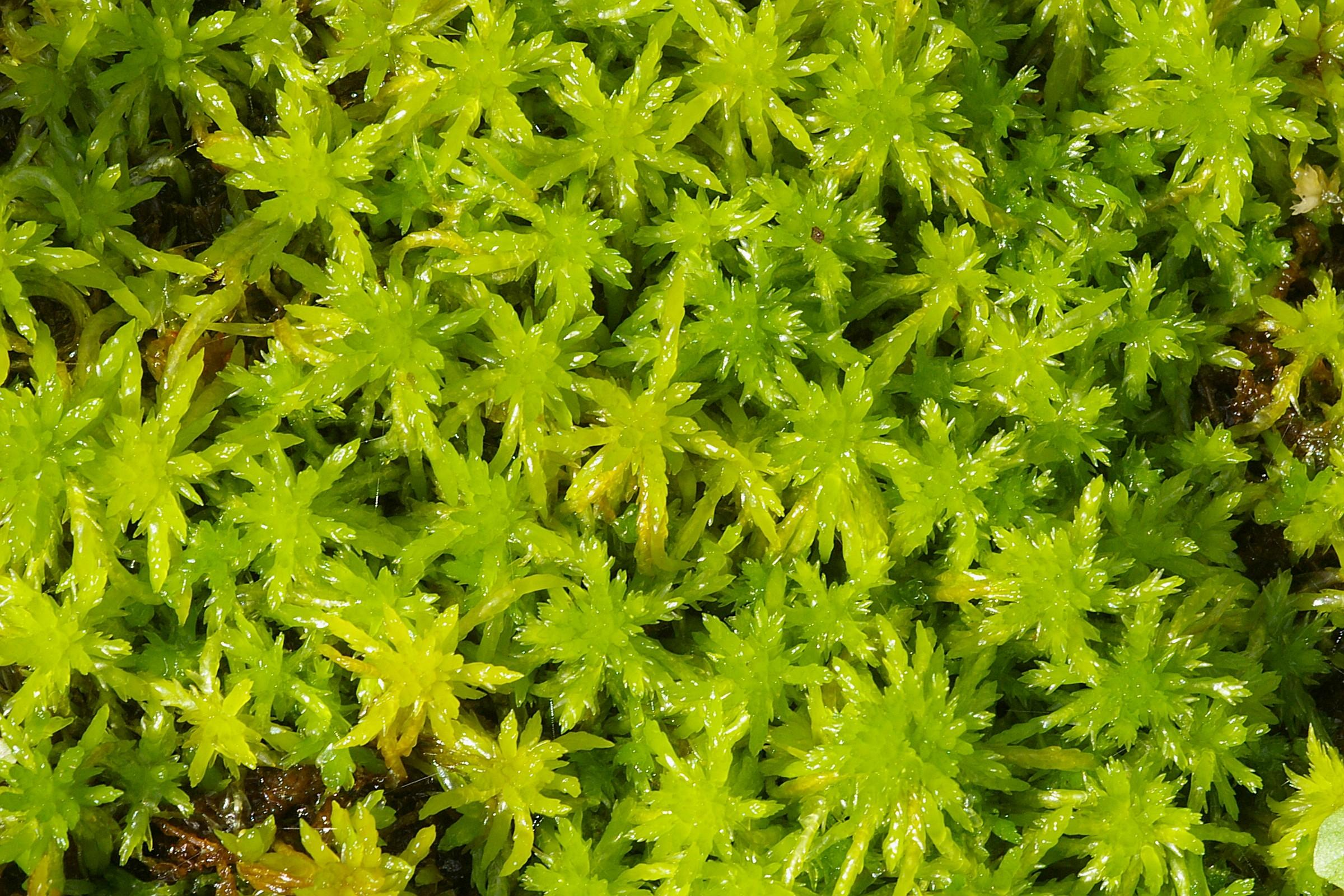
Flat-topped bogmoss (Sphagnum fallax).

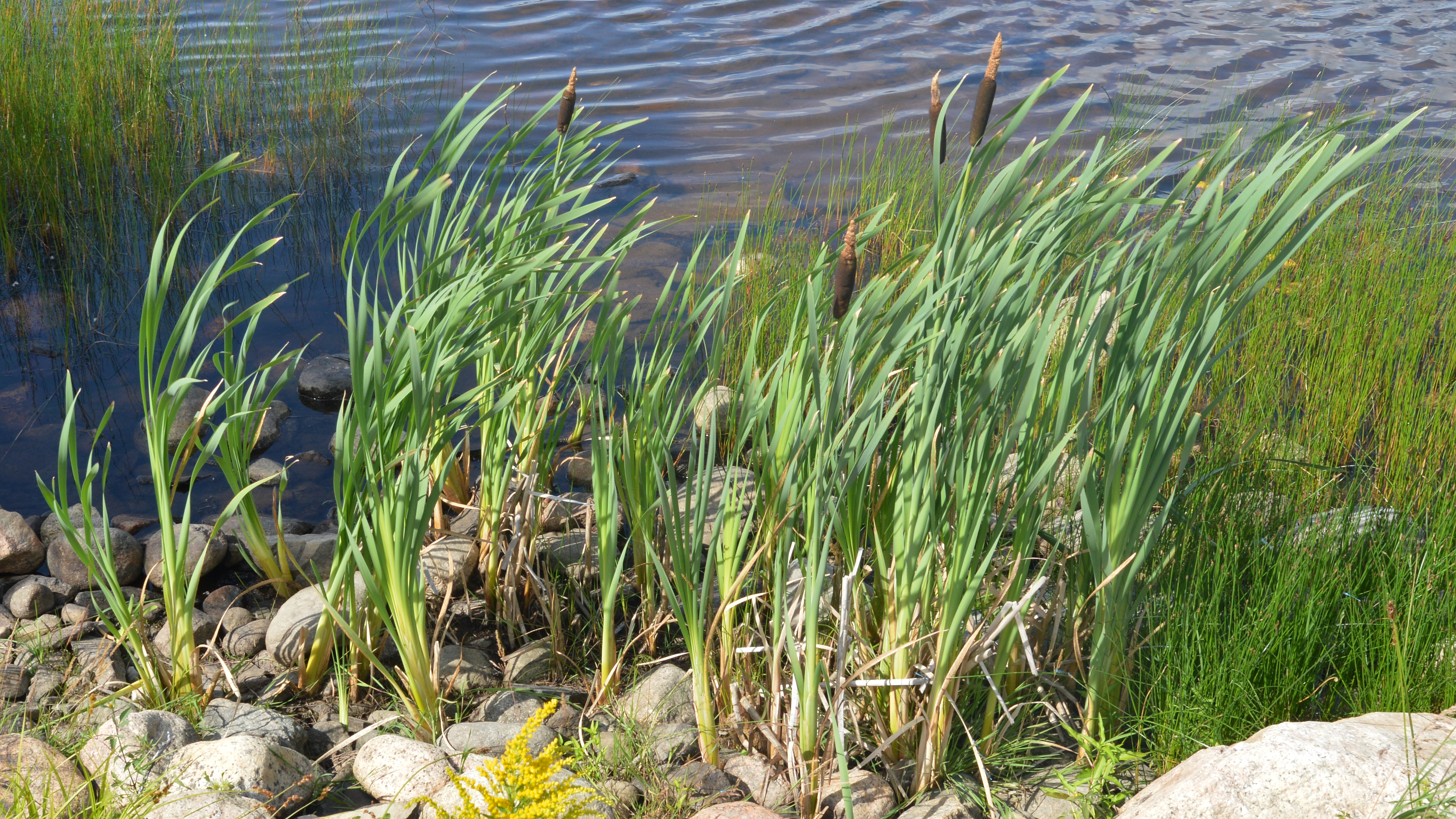
The broadleaf cattail plant (Typha latifolia)

=== Biological diversity ===
==== Plant life ====
Restoration efforts can cause alterations in the hydrology of the system, resulting in hydrological conditions that are more advantageous for the recolonization of Sphagnum mosses. Restoration can also lead to the successful succession of plant communities towards a targeted peatland vegetation by decreasing the abundance of species benefiting from drainage. However, the restoration process may not always result in the full re-introduction of pristine peatland species.

The rewetting of drained fen peatlands can lead to the growth of tall graminoid wetland plants, such as Common reed (Phragmites australis) and Broadleaf cattail (Typha latifolia), which can become the dominant vegetation for many years to decades. This can cause lasting changes to the biodiversity, ecosystem functioning, and land cover characteristics of the area, particularly in terms of geochemistry and hydrology.

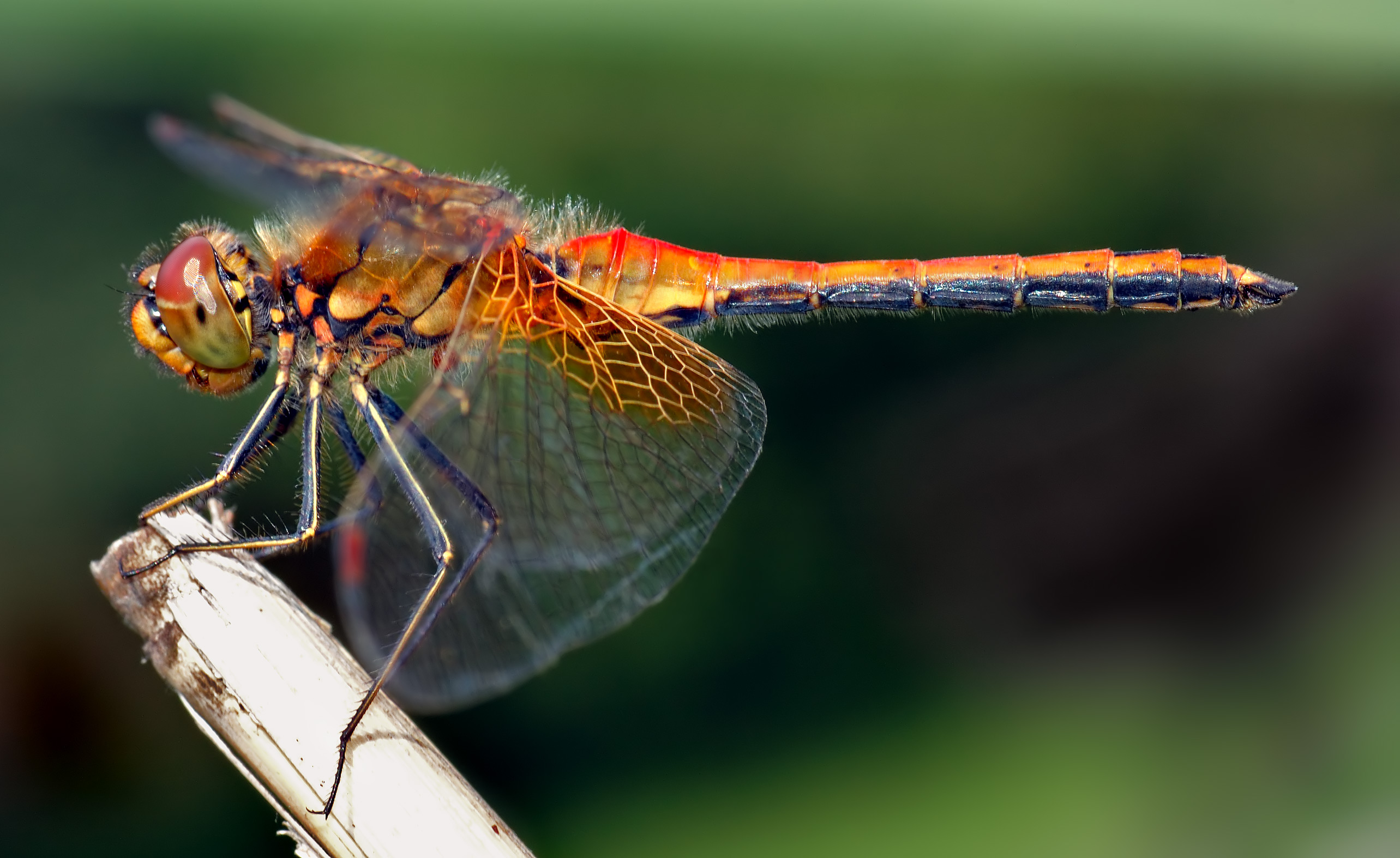
The yellow-winged darter dragonfly (Sympetrum flaveolum). Its breeding is confined to stagnant water, usually in peat bogs.

==== Animal life ====
In restored areas, the recovery of animal species is more likely to be affected by the resulting variation in environmental conditions, compared to plant species. Animal species have different requirements, and many of them need specific combinations of conditions, making them more sensitive to environmental changes. The ability of species to disperse and the proximity of source populations in undamaged peatlands are crucial factors that contribute to the recolonization of animal species in restored areas.

Of insects, Odonata species (dragonflies) are negatively impacted by drainage. However, according to a study in Finland, after the peatland restoration they tend to benefit and can colonize new water pools in just three years. Compared to the pristine sites, the drained sites had fewer Odonata species and lower abundance.

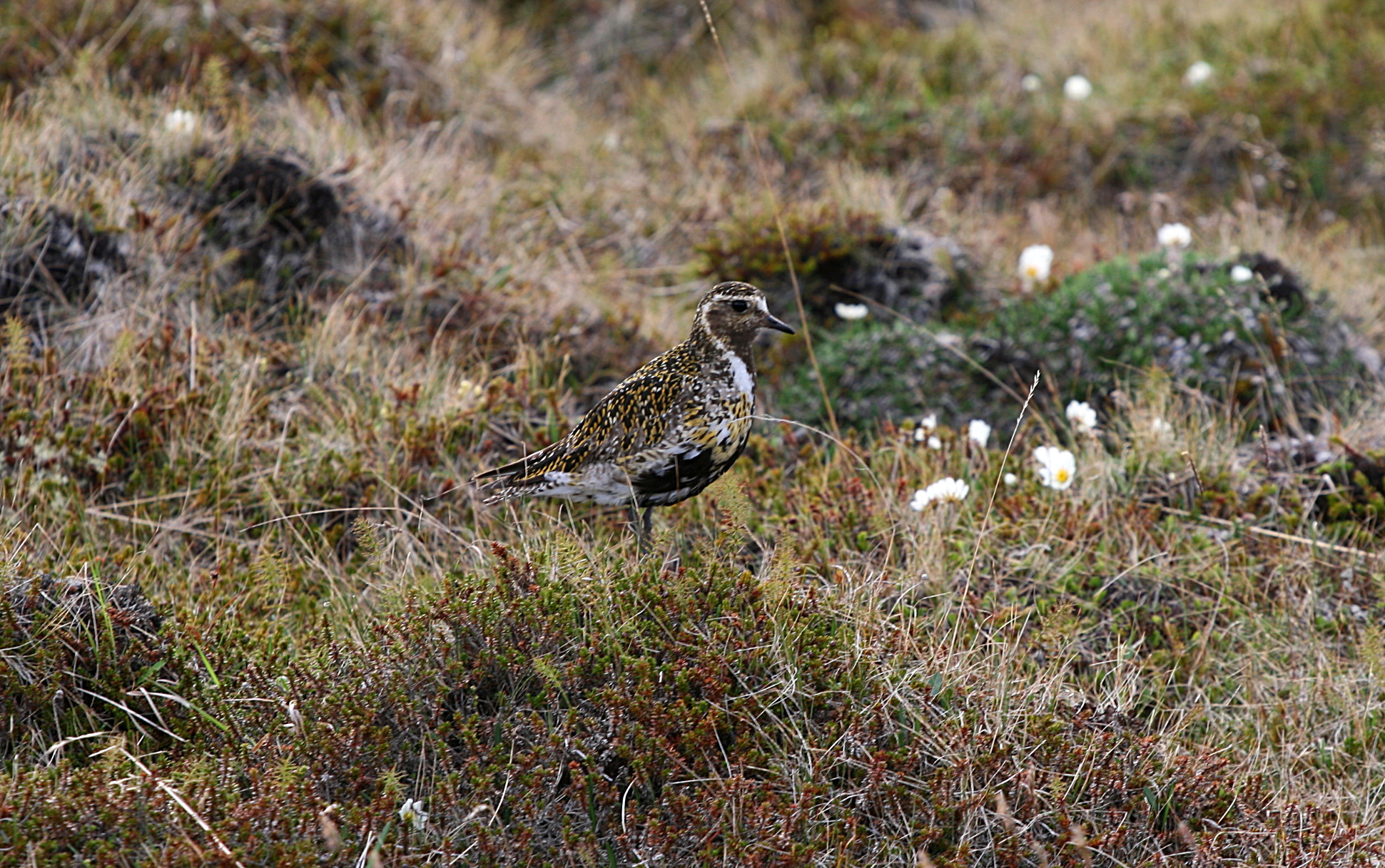
European golden plover (Pluvialis apricaria).

A study in Finland revealed that the composition of bird communities in restored areas is different from those in pristine areas and many bird species found in the restored peatlands are generalist in nature. To assess the recovery of specialized bird species in peatlands and bird communities in general, long-term monitoring is necessary.

A major peatland restoration project took place in Snowdonia (Eryri), Wales, where an upland farm witnessed the return of rare bird species after two decades of absence. During the summer of 2021, European golden plover (Pluvialis apricaria) and Eurasian Curlew (Numenius arquata) successfully bred in the rewetted habitats, and chicks sightings were recorded for both species. This is the first case of successful breeding at this site since the 1990s.

==== Fungi and others ====
The impact of disturbance and restoration on microbial communities is not completely clear. However, it has been observed that after disturbance in a bog, certain microbial communities were replaced by more broadly distributed species. After restoring the moisture levels of peat soil, non-mycorrhizal species increased while obligatory mycorrhizal species decreased. However, the proportion of non-mycorrhizal species found in undisturbed natural peatland was not achieved. The microbiome can recover from the negative effects of drainage through the process of rewetting. But even with this considerable improvement, the microbial community could only attain a similarity to undrained areas when the soil organic matter content was over 70%, indicating a soil that is not highly degraded.

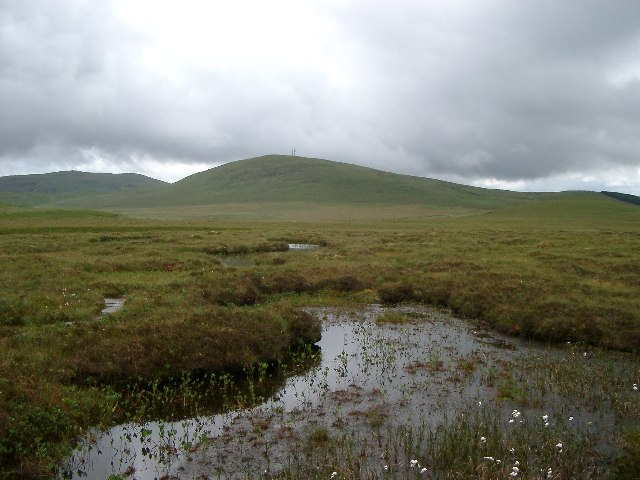
Forsinard Flows National Nature Reserve, in northern Scotland.

Studies conducted at Forsinard Flows, a natural reserve now undergoing large-scale peatland restoration, show that between 1998 and 2016:

- The abundance of fungal families that contain ericoid mycorrhizal species increased over time.
- A reduction in the presence of Tylospora (and other Atheliaceae species), which are ectomycorrhizal fungi, suggesting a recovery of the microbial community structure towards that of natural peatlands.
- The abundance and species richness of Auchenorrhyncha, (leafhoppers, and others) was considerably greater in peatland samples than in forest floor samples. The response in areas undergoing restoration was intermediate between the two.
- Moth abundance was highest in forest but species richness was highest in restoration areas.

== Restoration effects on society ==
=== Economy ===
In the United Kingdom, research conducted to assess the value that society places on the benefits of peatland restoration found that restoring 20% of Scotland's peatland would result in economic benefits estimated at between £80 and £336 million per year. A subsequent study found that if peatland restoration took place by 2027, it would provide £191 million of economic benefits annually for the country, net of restoration costs. Delaying peatland restoration until 2039–2050 would lead to a significant loss of economic benefits to society.

=== Addressing health risks ===
==== Fires and toxic haze ====
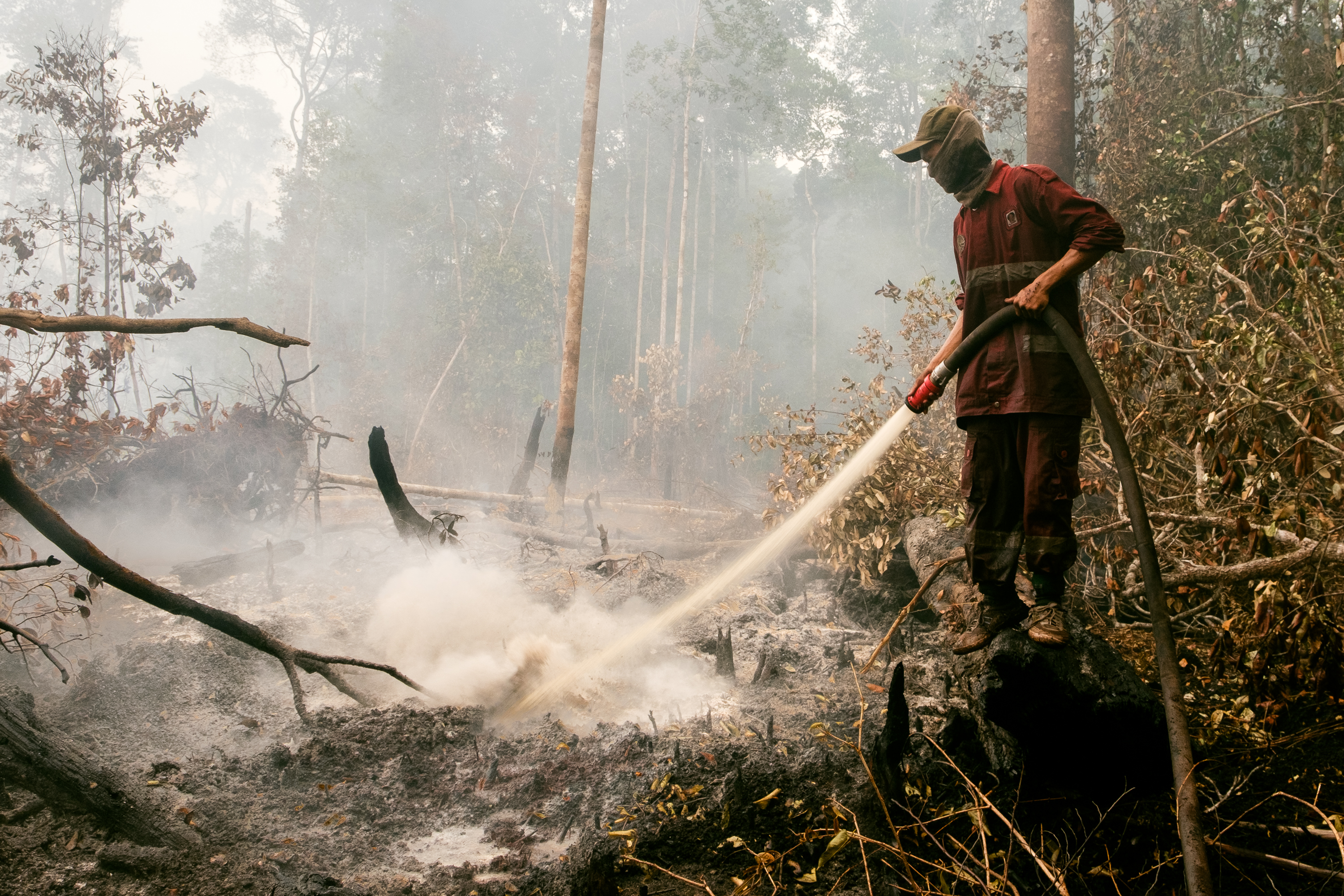
Extinguishing a fire in a peatland.

Peatland degradation, through exposure and increased dryness of landscapes, increases risks of fire. Peatland fires (dominantly caused by deforestation, human error or exposure) has led to immediate and longterm effects. Primarily, immediate risks of death and loss of land. Secondly, the effect of hazes or smoke from fires can create longterm health impacts, particularly respiratory issues. Tackling effects of fires and assisting peatland stability and restoration assist human health and lives as well as reducing habitat fragmentation and assisting recovery of ecosystems and plant within these landscape.

Restoration of peatlands could address the above impacts through creation of policy and/or adjusting use of the landscape, to protect and therefore reduce event occupancy of fires. Assisting stabilisation of this landscape could offer communities reassurance from risk while strengthening peatland ecosystems.

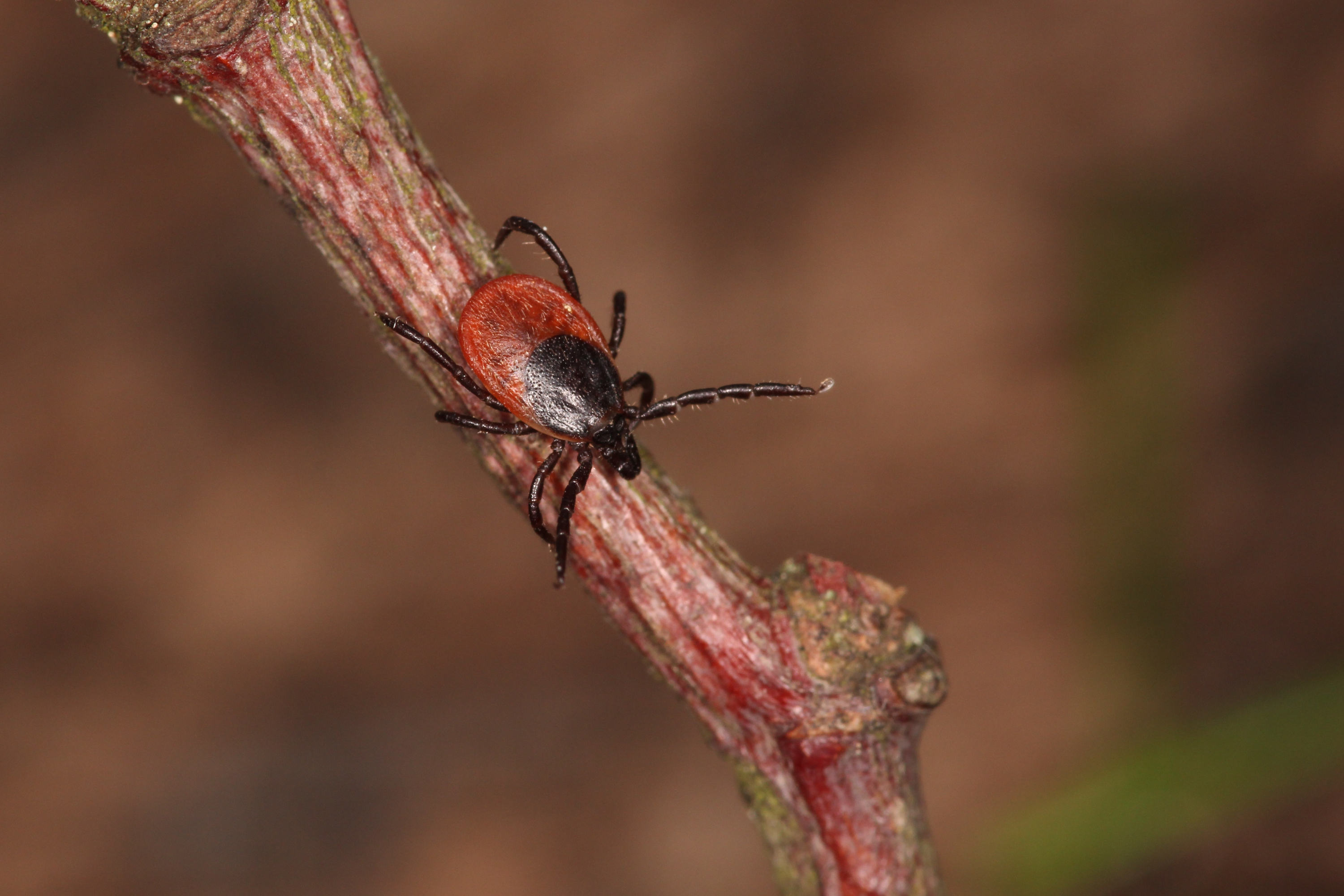
Castor bean tick (Ixodes ricinus), disease vector for Lyme disease.

==== Regulating pests and diseases ====
The process of converting forests into open peatlands will result in modifications to the water table, vegetation, and the communities of vertebrates that serve as hosts for ticks, particularly the Castor bean tick (Ixodes ricinus). These ticks can carry various disease-causing pathogens, including the Borrelia burgdorferi bacterium that is responsible for Lyme disease.

In a study conducted in Forsinard Flows, Scotland the restoration process resulted in a progressive decline in the number of ticks. The tick density was higher in recently felled areas than in older felled areas, declining over time. After 13 years of restoration, the tick densities were almost as low as in areas that were undamaged.

The surveys of host abundance that were conducted to determine the reason behind the low density of ticks in blanket bog revealed that deer, the main hosts for ticks in Scotland, preferred forest and felled areas instead of open blanket bog. The presence of a dense forest canopy creates a favorable environment for tick activity and survival, and thus there were likely more ticks in forestry than in felled areas.

== Approaches to restoration ==
=== Methods and techniques ===
Peatland restoration activities are site-specific and may call for a mixture of actions, depending on the initial conditions. A global synthesis identified 125 conservation interventions for peatland vegetation, many of which can be used to restore degraded peatlands.

==== Rewetting ====
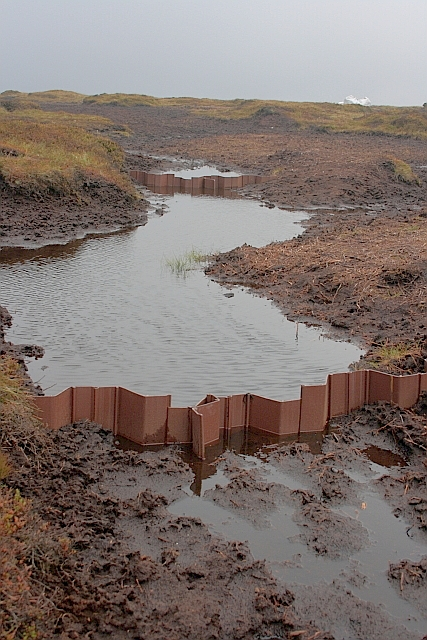
Plastic sheet piling dam on Edale Moor, England.

Rewetting involves returning a degraded peatland to its original waterlogged conditions, which are critical to restoring peat-forming vegetation and suppressing the risk of forest fire, aerobic microbial metabolism, and enzyme activity. By doing so, favorable conditions can be created for renewed peat accumulation, ultimately aiding in the peatland's restoration. The purpose of rewetting is to preserve soil moisture and decrease the rate of drainage, achieved by blocking and filling canals, and digging deep wells.

- Peat-dams are artificial barriers constructed from soil material, which are intended to block the flow of water in channels or gullies. The construction of these dams involves the use of unoxidized peat, which is highly stable, impermeable, and resistant to erosion. The process involves taking peat from the channel bottom, flipping it, and repositioning it slightly downstream from its original location to create a blockage. Additional peat material is used to build the dam, it can be obtained either from within the gully or from a separate borrow pit.
- Plastic dams are barriers made of interlocking sheets of impermeable plastic piling that are used to block gullies. They are capable of holding large volumes of water, which can result in the formation of deep pools. Their effectiveness depends on proper spacing, as incorrect spacing can lead to the failure of one or more dams. Plastic dams are only effective when placed on top of peat rather than mineral soil.
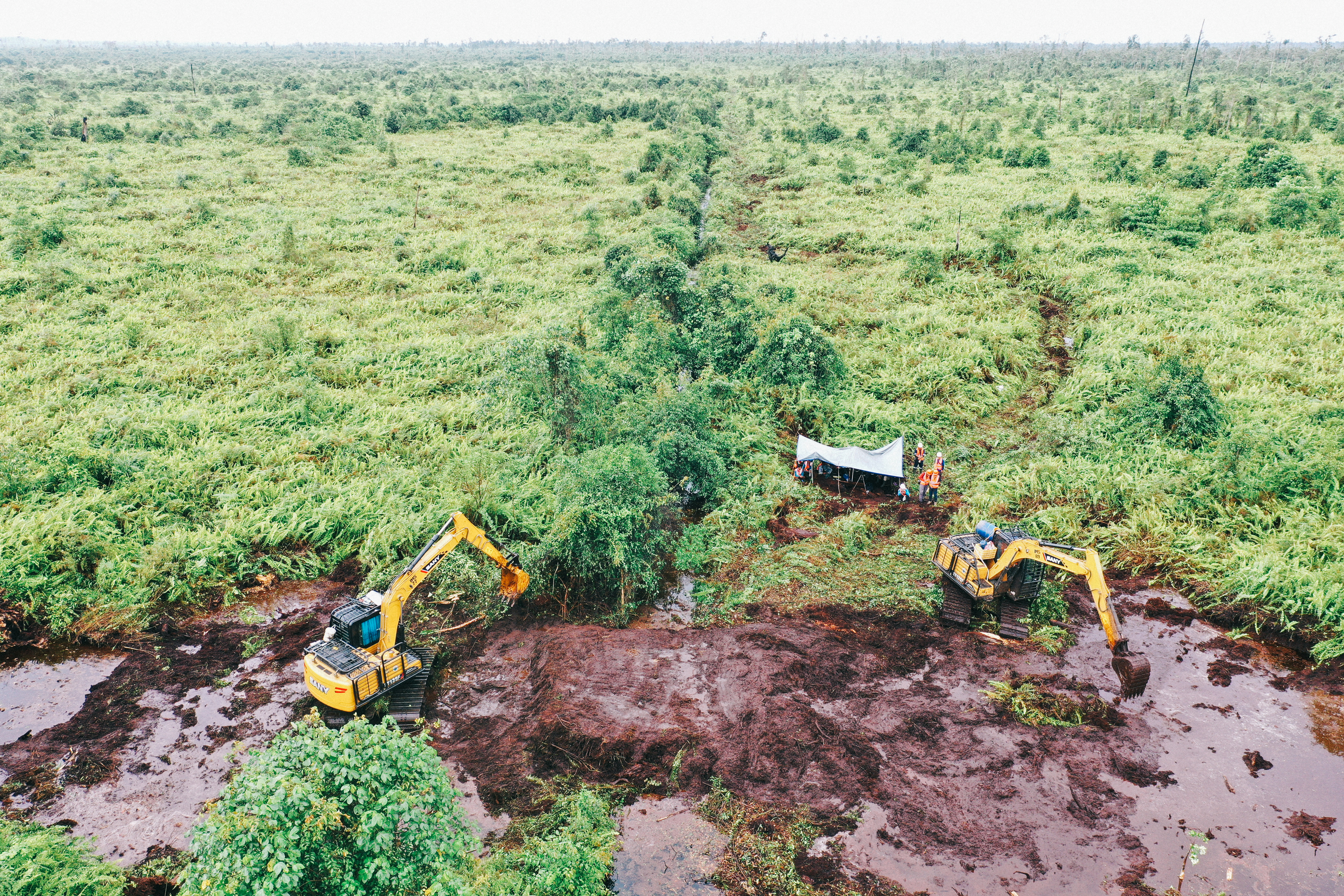
  Canal blocking using peat compaction dam to restore the water table in fire-prone forest in South Sumatra, Indonesia.
- Coir logs made from imported coconut husks and held in place by wooden stakes are also used to slow water flows and reduce erosion. Wool logs are also being trialled for the same purpose at Fleet Moss in the Yorkshire Dales and at sites in the North York Moors. This technique has the dual benefit of reducing the need to import coconut husks transported over long distances, and potentially regenerating a market for local fleeces. The method involves tightly packing wool into felt tubes and is also being used alongside tried-and-tested methods by the South West Peatland Partnership on Dartmoor.

==== Revegetation ====
Restoration efforts in peatland ecosystems involve the implementation of measures to recover the original vegetation cover, species richness, and local abundance through replanting activities on peatlands. Replanting activities in peatland ecosystems serve multiple objectives, such as introducing native and adapted plant species in open peatlands, enhancing degraded peat forest areas through enrichment planting, and using seed dispersal techniques to promote the regeneration of peatland vegetation.

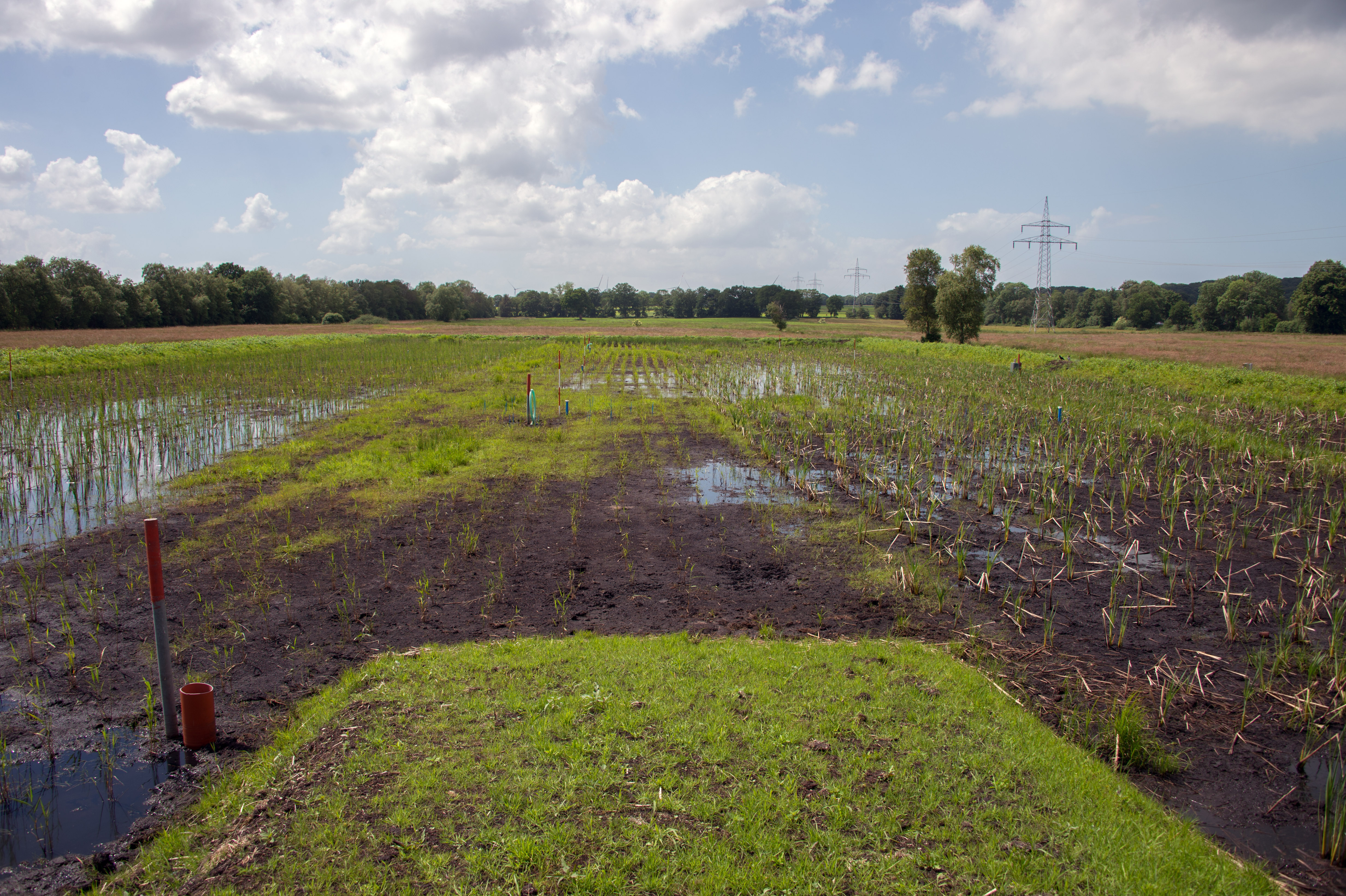
Experiment on Cattail (Typha) paludiculture in Germany.

==== Paludiculture ====
Paludiculture is a form of rewetting drained peatlands while it is further used for agriculture. The idea is to regenerate wet peatlands and increase the water table to get the peatland-ecosystem back to work, which stores high amounts of carbon. A main benefit is, that the land is used in two ways, as carbon sinks (peat) and for agricultural purposes. Based on different types of peatlands and regional reservation restrictions there are different forms of agriculture recommended. Among potential crops and usages are different kinds of berries, herbs, timber and biomass for biofuel.

==== Safeguard remaining 'pristine' peatlands ====
Opportunity of restoring damaged anthropogenically used peatlands is key. However, there are peatlands unmapped as well as pristine peatlands globally. Protection and policy remains centred on reduces damages and restoring peatlands currently damaged. However, there is little policy to protect currently pristine peatlands. One method of restoration is to prevent damage from furthering or beginning. Which could be initiated through policy to help support goals or protecting and restoring peatland areas.

=== International efforts and initiatives ===
==== Paris Agreement ====
Meeting the requirements of the Paris Agreement calls for carbon neutrality by 2050–2070, achieving this target entails rewetting 500,000 km^{2} of drained peatlands at an average rate of over one million hectares annually. The later challenge also intertwines with the purposes of "The 2021–2030 UN Decade on Ecosystem Restoration".

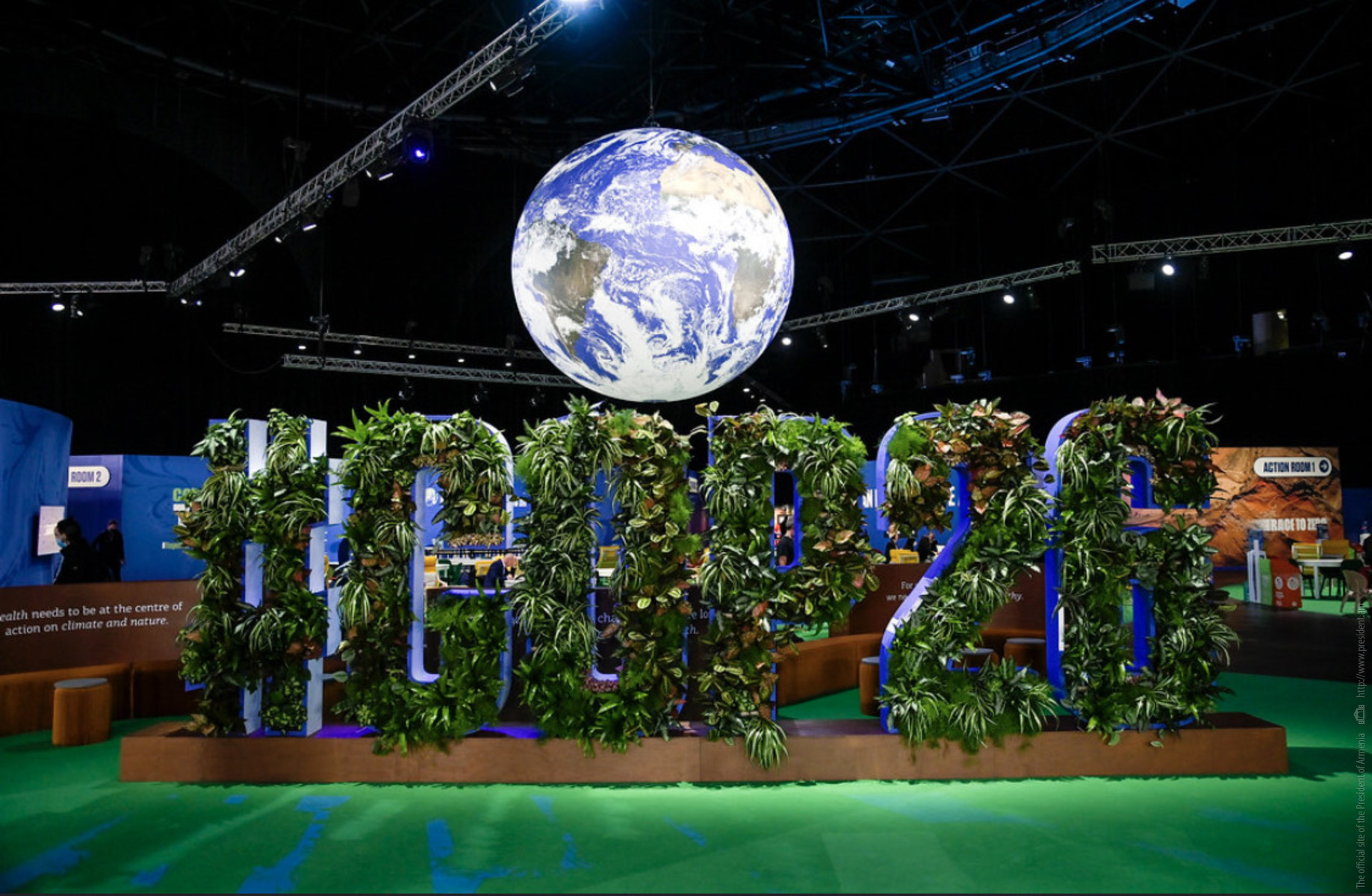
Welcome sign of the 2021 United Nations Climate Change Conference in Glasgow, Scotland.

==== Conference of the Parties (COP) ====
During the COP21 negotiations in Paris, a map highlighting global peatland hotspots was released to showcase the areas that require immediate attention to decrease greenhouse emissions.

At COP26, the Global Peatland Pavilion played a vital role in elevating discussions on the topic within the climate dialogue, served as both a physical and virtual gathering place for individuals involved in peatland management, research, policy-making, and other related areas across the globe. It provided a platform for sharing knowledge, experiences, and insights on the global protection, restoration, and sustainable management of peatlands among practitioners, researchers, policymakers, enthusiasts, and other stakeholders. On the final day of COP26 the talks for a future European Peatland Initiative where held.

- The Virtual Peatland Pavilion serves as a permanent source of information and knowledge. It was developed by Richard Lindsay from the University of East London and offers an extensive collection of digitized content for users to access. Additional content and domes will be incorporated into the resource as it evolves over time.

==== European Peatland Initiative ====
The European Peatlands Initiative (EPI) takes advantage of the expertise, knowledge, and experience of existing networks such as the UNEP-led Global Peatlands Initiative, among others, to facilitate progress in peatland conservation and restoration efforts. Through the establishment of strategic partnerships among countries the EPI serves as a unifying force in promoting knowledge-sharing, mutual learning, and increased investment, to protect valuable peatlands across Europe.

==== International Mire Conservation Group ====
The International Mire Conservation Group (IMCG) was founded in 1984 in Klagenfurt, Austria, as an international network of experts from a diverse range of specialities and interests, including research scientists, consultants, government agency specialists, and peatland site managers. By promoting, encouraging, and coordinating the conservation of mires and associated ecosystems the group aims to enhance knowledge-sharing and experience regarding mires and the factors influencing them. Over 550 members across almost 60 countries conform the network of IMGC.

==== International Peatland Society ====
The International Peatland Society (IPS) is a group of members (including individuals, corporations, students, and institutions) who share a common goal of responsible management and use of peatlands and peat. Established in Quebec, Canada in 1968, but now registered as an NGO in Finland. The IPS provides a platform for experts from various fields, involved in peat and peatlands, to connect with each other. The society currently has 1,575 members from 37 countries as of 1 January 2023.

==== Others ====
- Global Peatlands Initiative
- Ramsar Convention on Wetlands of International Importance Especially as Waterfowl Habitat
- North American Waterfowl Management Plan
- Wetlands International
- World Wetlands Day

=== National efforts and initiatives ===
==== Canada ====
- Ducks Unlimited Canada

This is an excerpt from the main page:

"Ducks Unlimited Canada (DUC) is a Canadian non-profit organization that works to conserve, restore and manage Canadian wetlands in order to preserve habitat for North American waterfowl, wildlife and people. They work with industry leaders, government agencies, landowners and other non-profit organizations to collaboratively protect critical habitats."

==== Indonesia ====
- The Peat Restoration Agency (BRG)

The Peat Restoration Agency (BRG) is a specialized, integrated and comprehensive institution established on 6 January 2016. Its main objective is to expedite the recuperation and reinstatement of the hydrological functions of degraded peat, predominantly resulting from drying and fire, through a well-planned, systematized and targeted approach.

- Katingan Mentaya Project

The Katingan Mentaya Project (KMP) is a tropical peatland forest conservation and restoration project in Central Kalimantan, Indonesia, covering 149,800 ha. It protects a highly biodiverse area of tropical peat swamp forest home to over 5% of the remaining global population of the Bornean Orangutan and other High Conservation Value (HCV) species. The Katingan Mentaya Project is managed by PT Rimba Makmur Utama in partnership with Wetlands International, Yayasan Puter, and Permian Global.

- Rimba Raya Biodiversity Reserve

This is an excerpt from the main page:

The Rimba Raya Biodiversity Reserve, nearly the size of Singapore, consists of 64,000 hectares of bio-diverse tropical peat swamp forest that contain as much as 1,000 plant and animal species per hectare and is one of the most highly endangered ecosystems on the planet. The project area and ongoing initiatives focus on environmental conservation, community outreach, and climate control.

The project developer, InfiniteEARTH, is an industry pioneer, delivering the world’s first REDD (forest carbon accounting) methodology in 2009.

- Sumatra Merang Peatland Project

The Sumatra Merang Peatland Project (SMPP), developed by Forest Carbon, restores over 22,900 hectares of peatland rainforest in South Sumatra's Merang region, Indonesia. With an area three times the size of Manhattan, the project protects a biodiversity hotspot home to 100+ endangered, threatened, or vulnerable plants and animal species and works with local communities to improve livelihoods and promote rural economic development.

The project area and the surrounding peat zones are known for high levels of biodiversity and a multitude of critically endangered and vulnerable species including the Sun Bear (Helarctos malayanus), the Rhinoceros Hornbills (Buceros rhinoceros), and the Sumatran Tiger (Panthera tigris ssp. Sumatrae).

==== United Kingdom ====
- Wildfowl & Wetlands Trust

This is an excerpt from the main page:

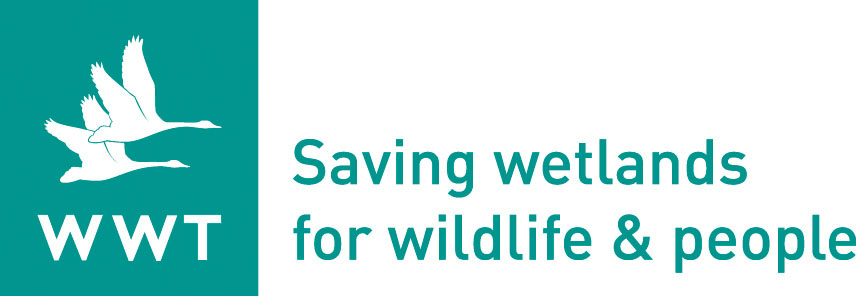
Logo of the charitable organisation the Wildfowl & Wetlands Trust.

"The Wildfowl & Wetlands Trust (WWT) is an international wildfowl and wetland conservation charity in the United Kingdom. Its patron is Charles III, and its president is Kate Humble."

- IUCN UK Peatland Programme

Established in 2009, the IUCN UK Peatland Programme encourages peatland restoration efforts in the United Kingdom. Through collaborations, scientific research, policy making, and effective practices, the Programme support the numerous benefits of peatlands. The Programme has five main objectives:

1. Notify the development of policies and legislation to guarantee the efficient conservation, restoration, and sustainable management of peatlands.
2. Raise awareness of the importance of peatlands ecosystems and garner support for their protection.
3. Increase information about peatland function and its connection with greenhouse gas emissions and water control.
4. Share knowledge with everyone involved in peatland administration.
5. Encourage good practices within peatland's core community while searching for restoration initiatives and economic opportunities.

==== United States of America ====
- Ducks Unlimited

Ducks Unlimited is the world's largest and most effective private organization dedicated to conserving, restoring, and managing wetlands and associated habitats for North America's freshwater aquatic birds. They recognize the challenges waterbirds conservation face due to the degradation and destruction of wetlands and other habitats, and aim to turn this pattern by collaborating with various stakeholders, including private individuals, landowners, agencies, and scientific communities.

==== Sweden ====
Life to ad(d)mire project was initiated to address the decline of specific wetland habitats and species at Natura 2000 sites in Sweden. The project aimed to accomplish that with hydrological restoration and vegetation rehabilitation. The ultimate goal was for the hydrologically-restored bogs to become carbon sinks, to prevent the ongoing loss of CO2 into the atmosphere caused by drained peatlands. The project was able to successfully and economically restore peatlands, leading to increased interest from both national and international stakeholders. In total 2930 hectares of wetlands across 28 sites in Sweden were restored through methods such as excavation, dam-building, and ditch-filling.

== Barriers to restoration ==
=== Policy and legislation role and examples ===
Policy creation and law building is a key to peatland restoration. One example is the Nature Restoration Law (NRL) targets specific restoration of Europe's degraded peatland ecosystems, habitats and species. With emphasis on wetland, rivers, forests, grasslands and marine ecosystems. A draft law within primarily targeted for restoring the drainage of peatlands from agricultural use. These targets advocate strongly for agricultural peatlands, however, most EU countries land use of peatlands is for peat extraction or forestry. EU countries hold an estimate of 350,000km2 of peatland of which more than 50% is degraded mainly by drainage from agricultural use, forestry and peat extraction. This demonstrate that although policy development is useful, it might be finely tuned to assist peatland restoration.

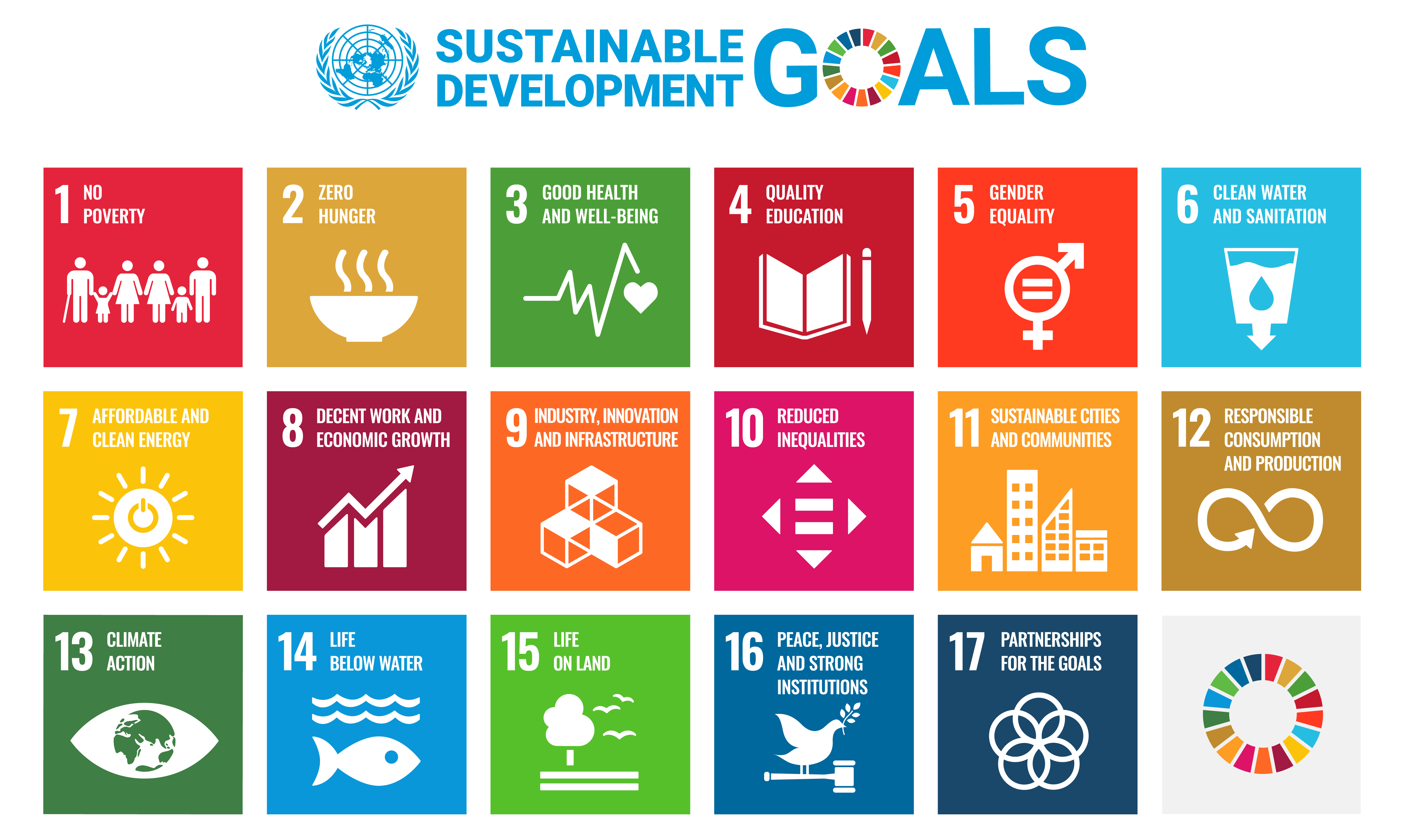
United Nations Sustainable Development Goals (SDGs).

Another example is the UN's SDG (Sustainable Development Goals), focusing on positive action and recovery across a variety of global issues. Goal 15 on protection and restoration of the environment is specifically important for restoration, but does not mention peatlands. Goal 13, to "take urgent action to combat climate change and its impacts" is used to advocate for peatland restoration. These acknowledgements are key to encouraging and supporting restoration policy development.

Policies such as these, could raise awareness to the importance of peatland restoration. To be furthered, emphasis on peatlands, its differing types and protection from usage (e.g. agricultural, extraction or pristine protections) has been proposed.

=== Meaningful timings and scales of effects ===
The more damaged an area of peatland is, the longer it will take to restore its ecosystems and natural biodiversity. This can occur as a lag to restoration resulting in a need for prolonged measurement and supervision of the landscape to produce recovery in an area. Consistency in action and regularly updates to goals are essential for accurate monitoring and restoration of peatlands.

Due to this, local initiatives need consistent funding and interest. However, global strategies may have far-reaching positive implications if policy and protection is extended further into peatland recovery from groups and larger governing bodies (such as UN legislation or national governments).

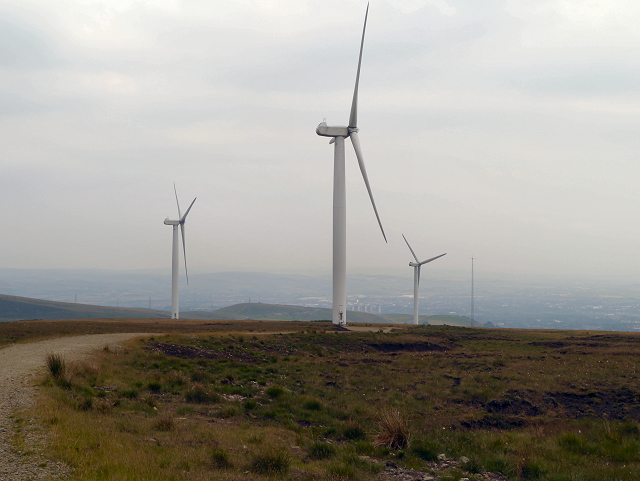
Wind turbines at Scout Moor, an upland moor of peat bog and heather in the South Pennines.

=== Change of land use ===
The development of renewable energy, transport and highways, extractive industries, housing, and other built infrastructure pose a threat to peatlands, which may have a negative effect on peatland conservation, on their biodiversity, and ecosystem function. Therefore, it is essential to have effective planning, development policies, and guidance to ensure sustainable development that does not harm the peatlands and their ecosystem function.

The effects of development on biodiversity can include:

- Loss or deterioration of habitats due to the introduction of materials and structures.
- Disturbances to species, causing direct harm or death.
- Impacts on the peatland's hydrological system.

Projects that cannot avoid peatland areas should aim to minimize their impact through mitigation measures, restoration of the development footprint, and broader peatland areas, as well as direct reinstatement efforts.

==== Agriculture and horticulture ====
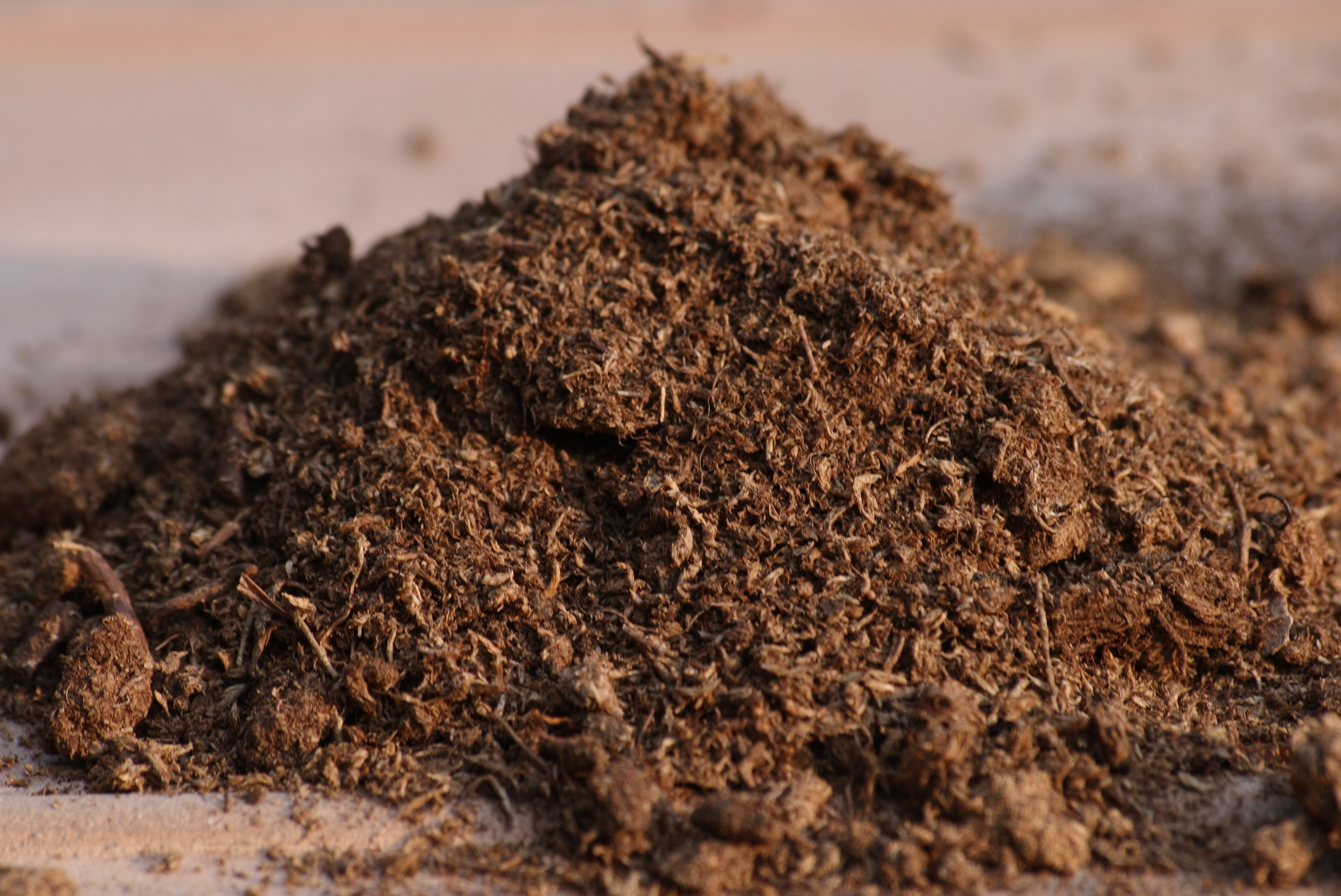
Commercial Canadian Sphagnum peat moss, a common soil supplement.

Revegetation and rewetting of drained peatlands may involve the loss of agricultural production areas or a decrease in their productivity. This may have a negative impact on the income of small farmers. The selection of restoration sites must conform to local governance systems, land rights and administrations. In parallel, it is essential to ensure that alternative livelihood options are available to the communities living in the restored areas.

Sphagnum peat moss is a frequently used growth medium for the cultivation of houseplants and forest plants, is obtained by harvesting peat bogs in the circumboreal area and then distributed across the globe. Peat moss is a crucial substrate for forest plant nursery production, as it significantly enhances the quality and survival of seedlings. The selection of this substrate is based on several factors, including its organic and mineral composition, ability to retain water, cost, and availability.

=== Society and culture ===
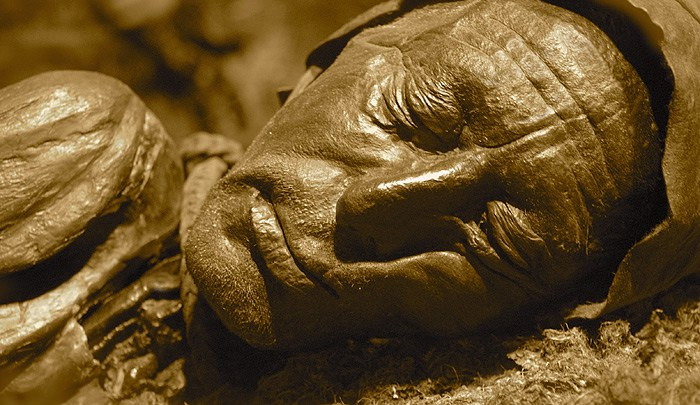
Preserved head of the Tollund Man.

Peatlands have historically been considered unproductive and have been drained for economic purposes for many centuries. In the Peruvian Amazonia, they are used for activities such as hunting, gathering palm fruits, and logging. But they are also associated with fear due to the risks of becoming lost, sinking into the marshy terrain, and encountering dangerous fauna, including anacondas and mythical creatures. A study conducted in Scotland demonstrated that the general public acknowledges the importance of the environmental advantages associated with peatlands; however, they also perceive a trade-off between preserving the peatlands and using their potential for productivity.

Despite the fact that many people today are unfamiliar with peatlands, some recognize them through references such as the discovery of the Tollund Man in a Danish peatland or the depiction of wetland ecosystems in The Lord of the Rings series, such as the scene where the hobbit Frodo navigates through the "Dead marshes".

== See also ==
- Wetland conservation
- Peat Cutting Monday
- Global Peatlands Initiative
- Peat swamp forest
- Sphagnum
- Tropical peat
- Wetland classification
- Acrotelm
- Pocosin
- Gyttja
- Groundwater-dependent ecosystems
- Freshwater swamp forest
- Converted wetland
