= Farmed wetlands =

Farmed wetlands, under the swampbuster program, are wetlands that were partially drained or altered to improve crop production before swampbuster was enacted on December 23, 1985. Farmed wetlands have undergone less alteration than prior converted wetlands, and are therefore subject to more stringent rules about further change. Farmed wetlands may be farmed as they were before the 1985 date, and the drainage that was in place before that date can be maintained, but no additional drainage is allowed.
