= Orangutan Foundation International =

American research and conservation project

- Founder: Dr. Biruté Mary Galdikas
- Type: 501(c)(3)
- Purpose: Conservation, protection, and rehabilitation of orangutans and their natural habitat
- Location: Indonesia Borneo
- Region served: Indonesia
- Method: Direct action
- Website: orangutan.org

Orangutan Foundation International (OFI) has its headquarters in Los Angeles, California. Founded by Dr. Biruté Galdikas, one of three anthropologists (The Trimates) to study great apes under the guidance of Dr. Louis Leakey, OFI continues to rescue and rehabilitate orangutans, preparing them for release back into protected areas of the Indonesian rain forest. In addition, OFI promotes the preservation of rain forest habitats.

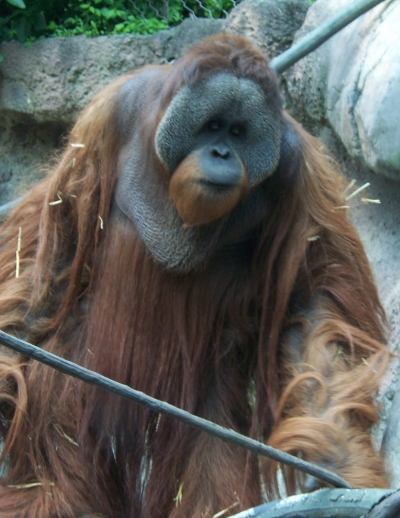
OrangutanP1

Originally called the Orangutan Research and Conservation Project, OFI was founded by Galdikas and former husband Rod Brindamour in 1986. The couple started the project to study the ecology and behavior of wild orangutans. The focus later turned towards conservation, protection, rehabilitation, and education of orangutans. The OFI's research facilities are located in the Indonesian owned part of Borneo, the third largest island in the world. Camp Leakey is where the research on orangutans is conducted and also where rehabilitated orangutans are released.

In 2021, the charity received a 4-star "Give with confidence"-rating from Charity Navigator for its 10th consecutive year. Charity Navigator assesses non-profit organizations by rating their performances based on Financial Health and their Accountability and Transparency. The assessment found that the charity’s total revenue is $2,321,023 in 2019 while 87.3% percent of the organizations total expenses are spent on the programs and services it delivers.

== Mission ==
The Orangutan Foundation International's stated mission is to support protection, conservation, and understanding about orangutans and their natural habitat while caring for orphaned orangutans and helping them make the transition back into the rain forest. The OFI also educates the public and the government about orangutans, rain forest, and the issues around conservation and protection of the apes and their environment.

== History ==
The Orangutan Foundation International was founded in 1986 by Dr. Birute Galdikas. The precursor to the OFI was the Orangutan Research and Conservation Project (ORCP), founded in 1971 by Galdikas with the help of Louis Leakey as moral and financial support. While working toward her Ph.D at UCLA, Galdikas went to see Leakey who was a guest speaker at the school. During the presentation Galdikas learned that Leakey had sponsored both Jane Goodall and Dian Fossey who also worked with primates and decided to ask him to sponsor her as well. Leakey agreed, and Galdikas, Goodall, and Fossey became The Trimates. In honor of Leakey, Galdikas' named the base camp Camp Leakey. The first work of the ORCP was taking orangutans that were being kept as pets from government officials and others. The formation of the ORCP gave Galdikas the opportunity to conduct 100,000 hours of observation of orangutans. In 1986, the ORCP morphed in the OFI. The new insight from Galdikas' research with the Asian Ape (orangutan) drew a lot of media attention. Galdikas' found that she needed something to turn the attention into positive action and created the OFI. The OFI's goals were a little bit different from its mother. The OFI is "aimed specifically at conservation, rehabilitation, research, and education". Lawyer John Beal visited Camp Leakey in 1979 and after his return to the United States, aided Galdikas' and others in the establishment of The Orangutan Foundation in Los Angeles, California, which is headquarters for the OFI.

== Camp Leakey ==
What began as two small huts is now a functional research facility. Camp Leakey is where all of the research the OFI conducts on orangutans is done. Others other than the OFI have studied and researched at Camp Leakey including graduate and undergraduate students from multiple institutions such as Universitas Nasional, a college in Indonesia, and universities in the United States. The camp now consists of about 19 miles of trails, rainforest, and swamp land for the rehabilitated orangutans and the wild orangutans that made their home there. The OFI takes in ex-captive, hurt, and orphaned orangutans. Once the ape is in the care of Galdikas and her staff, it is raised (if it is young) or treated for any diseases or injuries in the Care Center. The orangutans in the care center are taken each day by their keepers to Camp Leakey to be allowed to play in their natural habitat. This is done to slowly acclimate the orangutans back into the forest so one day they can be released. Once the orangutan is old enough and deemed suitable, it is released back into the wild. Some orangutans never learn to fend for themselves and for that reason can never leave the care center and the staff. Some orangutans do not want to leave the base of the OFI (where the staff eats and lives) and will venture back from time to time to visit the staff and volunteers.

== Controversy ==
An article from Nature on PBS says "Galdikas’s rehabilitation efforts, however, have brought controversy. The orphaned apes were often psychologically damaged and difficult to control. Some even attacked guests and staffers. Researchers questioned the value of observing the orphaned apes, wondering whether their behavior was representative of orangutans in the wild. Others were concerned that the released rehabilitated apes would spread diseases to local wild orangutan populations. Government officials began to challenge the work, even to withdraw permits. ... At the same time, Galdikas was becoming an increasingly active conservationist. Concerned by the rapid clearing of orangutan habitat, she lobbied the Indonesian government to set aside parks and curb illegal logging and orangutan trading — with some success. But her efforts came at a cost; she was threatened, harassed, and even kidnapped by those who opposed her work."

== OFI in the media ==
- IMAX film: Born to be Wild

== Sister organizations and partners ==
- Orangutan Foundation Canada
- Australian Orangutan Project
- Biruté Galdikas Ecology and Support Foundation

== See also ==
- InfiniteEARTH
