= Swampbuster =

Swampbuster is a provision officially titled the Wetland Conservation provisions of the Food Security Act of 1985 (P.L. 99–198) that discourages the conversion of wetlands to cropland use. The original purpose was a balance between attempting to reduce crop subsidies (reduce supply to increase crop prices), and conserving wetlands (1985 Conference Report). The non-compiance trigger was planting a crop on a converted wetland. In the 1990 amendments, the purpose was somewhat refined to conserve wetland, with less emphasis on reducing supply. The trigger was expanded to converting a wetland to make crop production possible, without the mandate of planting.

USDA program participants, defined as "persons" in 7 CFR 12 Highly Erodible Land and Wetland Conservation, converting a wetland not provided an exemption in 7 CRR 12.5(b), after December 23, 1985, lose eligibility for most federal farm program benefits. Wetland conversions actions (manipulations) include drainage or removal of woody vegetation (7 CFR 12.2). As is provided in 7 CFR 12.4, benefits are lost when wetlands are converted until they have been restored. Several types of wetlands and activities are exempt. Exceptions (exemptions) are provided in 7 CFR 12.5(b) and include conversions and array of actions including, but not limited to, conversions that began before December 23, 1985, conversions of wetlands that had been created artificially, crop production on wetlands that became dry through drought, and conversions that USDA has determined have minimal effect on wetland values. Swampbuster provisions (Wetland Conservation provisions) were amended in the 1990, 1996, 2002 and subsequent farm bills to provide greater flexibility for producers and landowners.

The most significant amendment in the 1990 farm bill was directing that when USDA issues a wetland determination, that determination is certified by signature of USDA that the determination is accurate and sufficient. In the 1996 amendments, certification (providing certainty) was clarified making plain that certified determinations remains valid by law and regulation unless the person requests a review, commonly referred as RFR by USDA NRCS. USDA cannot proactively change any determination issued as certified after November 23, 1990 (date the 1990 amendments were signed into law). A person who feels their previously issued certified wetland determination has errors (wetland determination, size of wetland, or wetland label) can submit a RFR to USDA NRCS; however, the person (by regulation) must provide examples of errors. For this reason, obtaining expert opinions is recommended as it is common for NRCS to deny the RFR without proper consideration of the facts.

Also of significance is the statutory change in 1996 that once determined a Prior Converted Cropland (PC), that determination is not subject to abandonment. Both changes were codified in the federal register in 1996 (7 CFR 12).

Although not provided by statute, the USDA NRCS in their effort to protect wetlands, added stronger wetland protections by internal agency policy (USDA Natural Resources Conservation Service's National Food Security Act Manual (NFSAM)) and eventually by regulation in 1996 (7 CRR 12.2-Definitions). These additional protections, provided by agency policy and Departmental regulation, in conflict with statutory authority, were provided to certain wetland types that provide habitat to migratory waterfowl. For example, certain wetland types (prairie potholes, playa lakes and pocosins) are provided special protections under what NRCS identifies as a Farmed Wetland (FW). Another example of NRCS exceeding their statutory authorities, is when the agency added to internal agency policy, and ignoring rule-writing as required by the Administrative Procedure Act (APA), a change in the statutory trigger of non compliance ("making production possible"). NRCS defines by policy that "making production possible" includes increasing yields by drainage on lands (wetlands) where production was already possible. The efforts by NRCS to exceed their statutory authorities are commonly and successfully challenged in the courts (Barthel v. USDA 1999, Koshman v. USDA 2012).

== See also ==
- Converted wetland
- Farmed wetlands
