= Biruté Galdikas =

Canadian primatologist and conservationist (1946–2026)

Biruté Galdikas OC
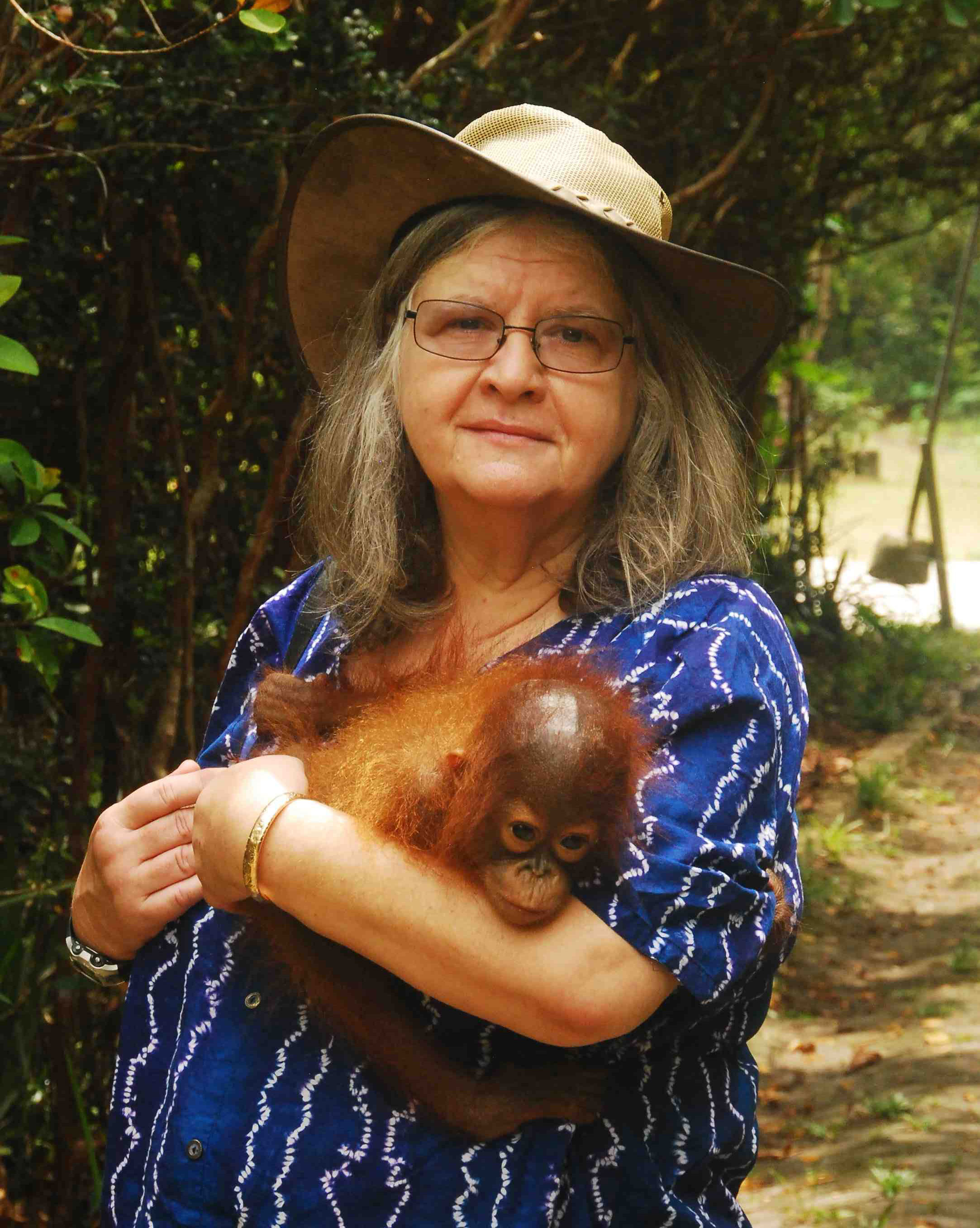
- Galdikas in 2011
- Born: Birutė Marija Filomena Galdikas; 10 May 1946; Wiesbaden, Greater Hesse, Germany
- Died: 24 March 2026 (aged 79); Los Angeles, California, US
- Education: UCLA (BA, MA, PhD)
- Known for: Study of orangutans; conservation
- Children: 3
- Awards: Tyler Prize for Environmental Achievement (1997)
- Scientific career
- Fields: Primatology; anthropology; ethology
- Workplaces: Simon Fraser University
- Thesis: Orangutan Adaptation at Tanjung Puting Reserve, Central Borneo (1978)

Birutė Marija Filomena Galdikas or Biruté Mary Galdikas OC (10 May 1946 – 24 March 2026) was a Canadian anthropologist, primatologist, conservationist, ethologist and author. She was a professor at Simon Fraser University. In the field of primatology, Galdikas was recognized as a leading authority on orangutans. Prior to her field study of orangutans, scientists knew little about the species.

== Early life ==
Galdikas was born on 10 May 1946 in Wiesbaden, Greater Hesse, Germany. Her parents, Antanas and Filomena Galdikas, were Lithuanian refugees fleeing the Soviet occupation of the Baltic states following World War II. When Galdikas was two years old, the family moved to Canada, when her father signed a contract to work in copper mining in Quebec. The following year, they relocated to Toronto, where Galdikas grew up. Her father worked as a miner and a contractor. As a young child, Biruté's head was filled with visions of far-off forests and exotic creatures. The first book she borrowed from the Toronto Public Library was a tale about a monkey named Curious George. When she grew older, she was inspired by the National Geographic adventures of Jane Goodall and Dian Fossey. She had two younger brothers and a younger sister.

== Education ==
In 1962, the Galdikas family moved to Vancouver. Two years later, after Galdikas had begun studies at the University of British Columbia (UBC), the family moved to the United States, where Galdikas enrolled in the University of California, Los Angeles (UCLA), and studied psychology and zoology. In 1966, she earned her bachelor's degrees in psychology and zoology, jointly awarded by UCLA and UBC. That year she also met her future husband, Rod Brindamour from Vancouver, who was on a trip to Los Angeles. She married Brindamour and earned her master's degree in anthropology from UCLA both in 1969.

During her graduate studies at UCLA, Galdikas met paleoanthropologist Louis Leakey, and proposed a plan aimed at studying orangutans in their natural habitats. Galdikas convinced Leakey to help orchestrate her endeavour, despite his initial reservations. Leakey found funding from the National Geographic Society, which agreed to establish a research facility in Borneo. Galdikas's research became the basis of her doctoral studies, and she earned her doctorate in anthropology from UCLA in 1978.

== Works ==
=== Research in Borneo ===
In 1971, at age 25, Galdikas and her then-husband, photographer Rod Brindamour, arrived in Tanjung Puting Reserve, in Indonesian Borneo. Galdikas was the third of a trio of women appointed by Leakey to study great apes in their natural habitat. Dubbed by Leakey "The Trimates" and by the public as "Leakey's Angels", the trio also comprised Jane Goodall, who studied chimpanzees, and Dian Fossey, who studied gorillas. Leakey and the National Geographic Society helped Galdikas set up her research camp near the edge of the Java Sea, dubbed "Camp Leakey", to conduct field study on orangutans in Borneo. Before Galdikas's studies, the orangutan was the least understood of the great apes. Her long-term research at Camp Leakey, carried out in collaboration with her doctoral students Gary Shapiro (early 1980s) and Graham L. Banes (2000s–2010s), has spanned multiple generations of fieldwork and contributed substantially to understanding orangutan behaviour, ecology, and conservation, including identification of the species' eight-year birth cycle - which makes orangutans highly vulnerable to extinction, although the 6,000 wild orangutans living in Tanjung Puting today constitute the largest single population in the world. Together, this collaborative body of work helped establish one of the most comprehensive longitudinal datasets on a wild great ape population. At the time, the research program constituted the world's longest continuous study of any mammal led by a single principal investigator.

=== Orangutan Foundation International ===
In 1986, Galdikas and her colleagues founded Orangutan Foundation International (OFI), based in Los Angeles, USA, to help support orangutans around the world. Her second husband, Pak Bohap, who was a Dayak rice farmer and tribal president, assisted in setting up sister organisations in Australia, Indonesia, and the United Kingdom and is co-director of the orangutan program in Borneo.

=== Advocacy and rehabilitation work ===
Galdikas remained in Borneo for over 40 years while becoming an outspoken advocate for orangutans and the preservation of their rainforest habitat, which is rapidly being destroyed by loggers, palm oil plantations, gold miners, and unnatural conflagrations. Galdikas's conservation efforts also extended beyond advocacy, with an additional focus on rehabilitation of the orphaned orangutans turned over to her for care. Many of these orphans were once illegal pets, before becoming too smart and difficult for their owners to handle.

She wrote several books, including a memoir entitled Reflections of Eden. In it, Galdikas describes her experiences at Camp Leakey and efforts to rehabilitate formerly captive orangutans and release them into the Borneo rainforest.

Galdikas was a professor at Simon Fraser University in Burnaby, British Columbia, and Professor Extraordinaire at the University of Indonesia in Jakarta. She was also president of the Orangutan Foundation International in Los Angeles, California.

In 2021, Galdikas became a patron of the nature conservation non-profit organisation the Ancient Woods Foundation aiming to protect the remaining old-growth forests in Lithuania with all the biodiversity there.

== Death ==
Galdikas died in Los Angeles on 24 March 2026, at the age of 79, from lung cancer.

== Recognition ==
Galdikas was featured in Life; The New York Times; The Washington Post; the Los Angeles Times; numerous television documentaries; and twice on the cover of National Geographic.

In 1995, Galdikas was made an Officer of the Order of Canada.

Along with fellow Trimate Jane Goodall and preeminent field biologist George Schaller, Galdikas received the Tyler Prize for Environmental Achievement in 1997 for her groundbreaking field research and lifetime contributions to the advancement of environmental science. Other honours include Indonesia's Hero for the Earth Award (Kalpataru); Institute of Human Origins Science Award; United Nations Global 500 Award (1993); Elizabeth II Commemorative Medal; the Eddie Bauer Hero of the Earth (1991); PETA Humanitarian Award (1990); the Sierra Club Chico Mendes Award (1992); and the UCLA Professional Achievement Award (2001). She was awarded a key to the city of Las Vegas, Nevada. In June of 2025 she was awarded the Explorers Club Medal

== Media ==
=== Books ===
- Reflections of Eden: My Years with the Orangutans of Borneo (1995). ISBN 0316301868.
- Orangutan Odyssey (1999). ISBN 978-0810936942.
- Great Ape Odyssey (2005). Abrams: New York. ISBN 978-1-4351-1009-0.

=== Film and television ===
Galdikas starred in the feature documentary Born to Be Wild 3D, released in April 2011. She also appeared in the documentaries Nature (TV series, PBS, 2005); Life and Times (TV series, CBC, 1996); 30 Years of National Geographic Specials (TV documentary, 1995); Orangutans: Grasping the Last Branch (documentary, 1989); Beauty and the Beasts (Channel 4 UK documentary, 1996); The Last Trimate (TV documentary, 2008); She Walks with Apes (CBC TV documentary, 2019); and Terry Pratchett's Jungle Quest (documentary, C4, UK 1995).

== Controversy ==
Galdikas was criticised in the late 1990s regarding her methods of rehabilitation. Primatologists debated the issue on the Internet mailing list Primate-Talk; the issue was further fuelled by the publication of articles in Outside magazine (May 1998) and Newsweek (June 1998). As reported in both articles and summarized in the 1999 book A Dark Place in the Jungle by Canadian novelist Linda Spalding, the Indonesian Ministry of Forestry—with whom Galdikas had clashed over logging policies—claimed that Galdikas held "a very large number of illegal orangutans ... in very poor conditions" at her Indonesian home, prompting the government to consider formal charges. Galdikas denied all such claims in a response to Newsweek in June 1999, remarking that allegations of mistreatment were "simply, wrong" and that the "outlandish" claims formed the basis of "a totally one-sided campaign against me."

== See also ==
- InfiniteEARTH – Hong Kong conservationist land developer
- Jeffrey H. Schwartz – American anthropologist
- List of animal rights advocates
- List of apes
- Timeline of women in science
