= Rimba Raya Biodiversity Reserve =

Protected area in Kalimantan, Indonesia

- Location: Seruyan Regency, Central Kalimantan, Indonesia
- Area: 64,000 ha (160,000 acres)

The Rimba Raya Biodiversity Reserve, nearly the size of Singapore, consists of 64,000 hectares of bio-diverse tropical peat swamp forest that contain as much as 1,000 plant and animal species per hectare and is one of the most highly endangered ecosystems on the planet. The project area and ongoing initiatives focus on environmental conservation, community outreach, and climate control. Rimba Raya is home to one of the few remaining relic populations of wild orangutans and is the largest privately funded orangutan reserve in the world. The area is also one of the world’s largest repositories of carbon. Rimba Raya is the world’s largest REDD+ project -Reduced Emissions from (Avoided) Deforestation and Degradation (REDD). The project developer, InfiniteEARTH, is an industry pioneer, delivering the world’s first REDD (forest carbon accounting) methodology in 2009.

Rimba Raya Overview

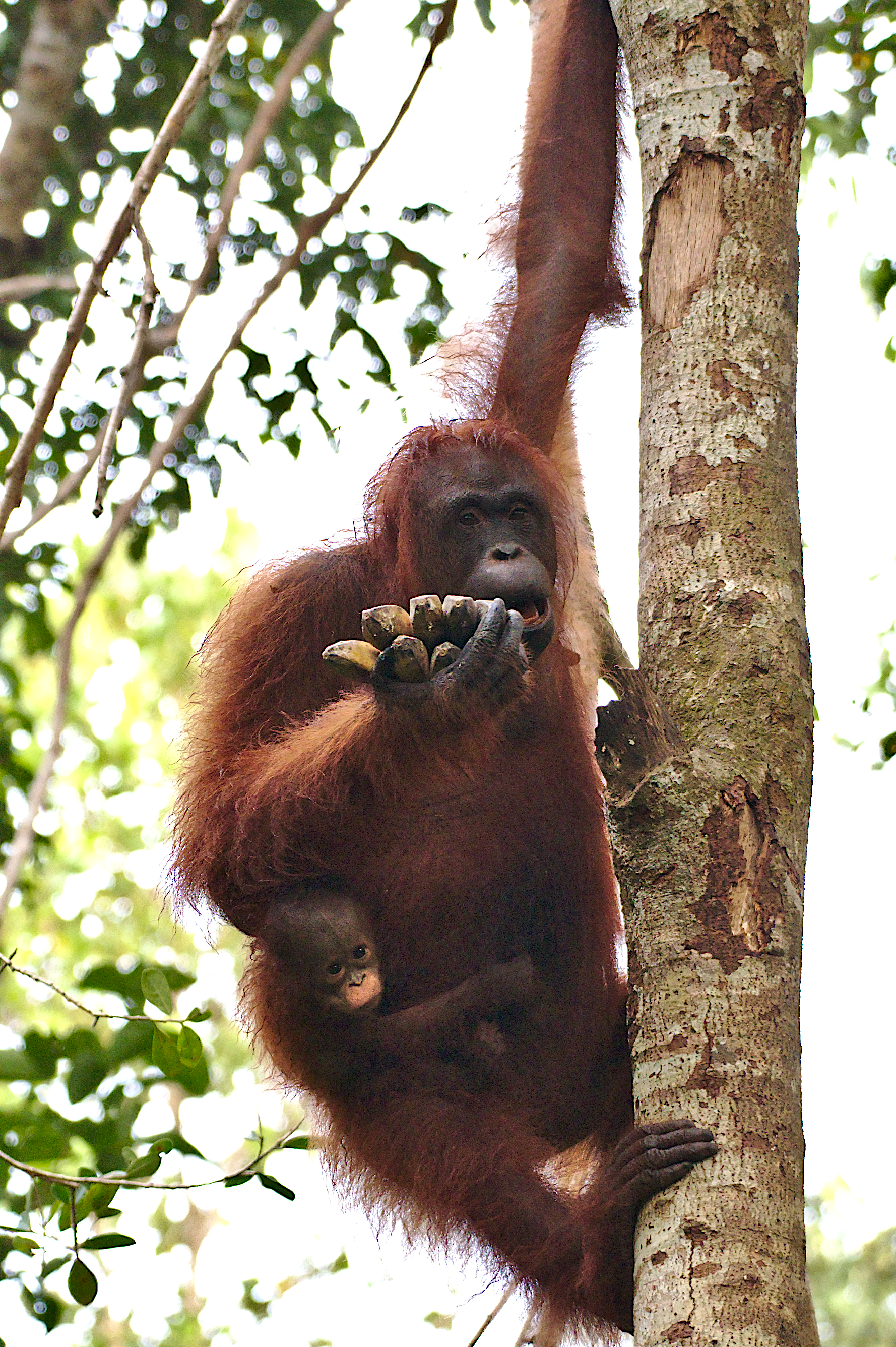
Orangutan and her baby, eating bananas in the Rimba Raya Biodiversity Reserve

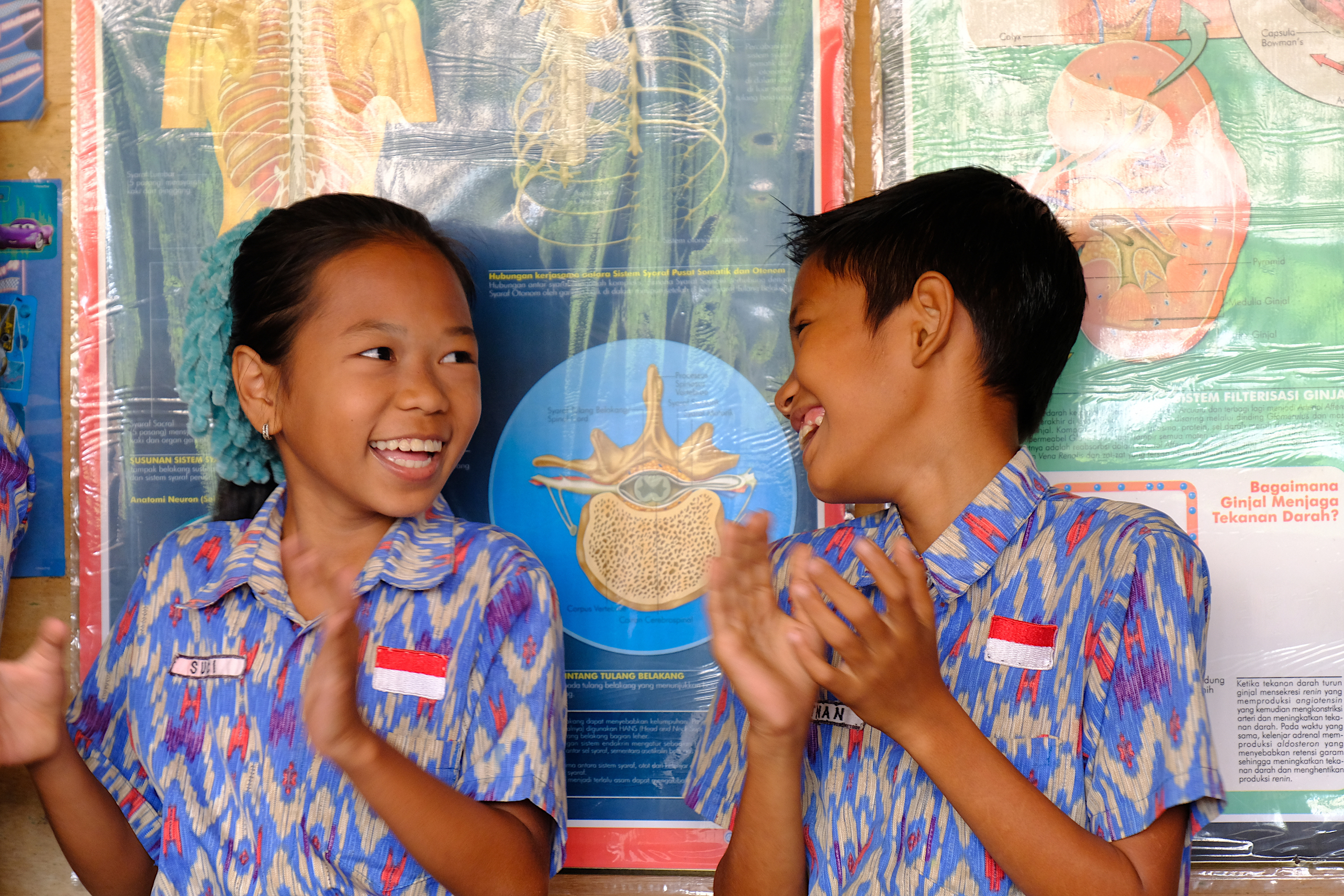
School Children in Muara Dua Village within the Rimba Raya Biodiversity Reserve

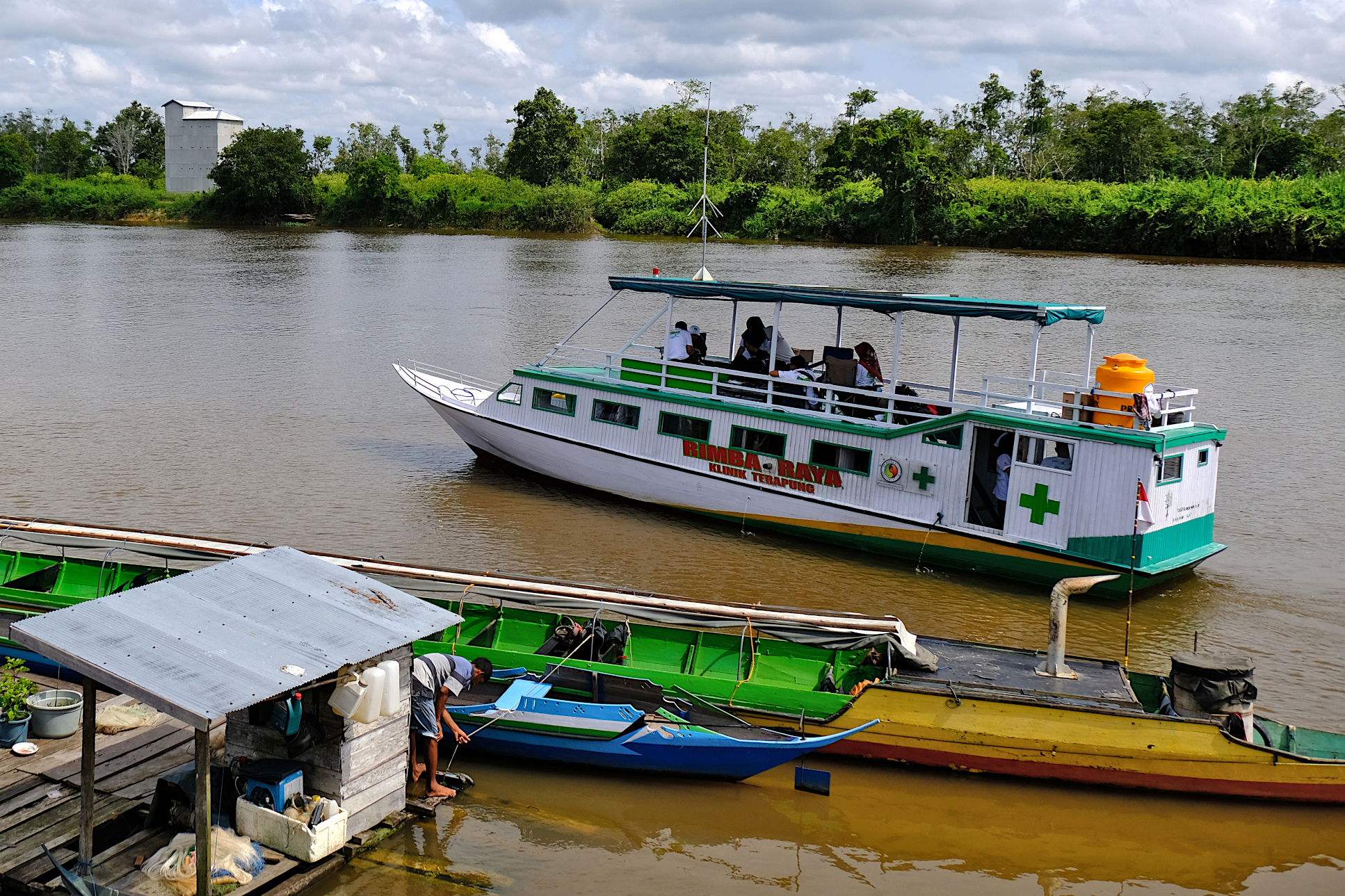
Floating Clinic at Rimba Raya Biodiversity Reserve

== Location ==
The reserve is located on the island of Borneo in the Province of Central Kalimantan, Indonesia, where ever-expanding palm oil plantations have wreaked havoc on the forest and the communities and wildlife that depend on it. The project provides a critical buffer to the Tanjung Puting National Park, home to world-renowned Camp Leakey research center and is bounded by the Java Sea to the south, and the Seruyan River to the east.

== Fauna ==
The Rimba Raya Biodiversity Reserve provides safe refuge to 122 species of mammals and 300 species of birds. The reserve is most notably home to the Borneo Orangutan. This endangered species is one of only three remaining species of great apes that once inhabited tropical forests in Thailand, Southern China, Malaysia, and Indonesia. Now they are found only in a few fragmented forests on the islands of Sumatra and Borneo.

== Flora ==
The Rimba Raya Reserve is home to a wide variety of vegetation The various land classifications include: mangrove and tidal/brackish water swamps near the coast line; marshy, grass-dominated wetlands; riparian and freshwater swamp forest associated with the Seruyan River and its many tributaries; peat swamp forest developing on peatlands of various depths (up to and exceeding 5 meters deep), kerangas (heath) vegetation of various forms (tall to stunted) on sandy soils; and lowland mixed dipterocarp forest on mineral soils. The diversity of vegetation is in part due to historical environmental disturbances, including: logging, burning, peat drainage, and natural vegetation conversion to agriculture. This has caused changes in the overlaying natural vegetation types, including: post-fire shrubland and regenerating logged forests.

== Projects Initiatives ==
Community Outreach- Through Infinite Earth’s project development, several initiatives have been put into place within the communities that have historically depended (unsustainably) on the forests of Rimba Raya. These programmes work towards addressing all 17 of the United Nations Sustainable Development Goals. The main initiatives focus on the welfare of women and children living at the margins within this area. Rimba Raya’s REDD+ program has worked to provide alternative income streams for this forest dependent community. The mission is to keep the community from working in industries that are linked to deforestation. The REDD+ project has also provided: water filters, cookstoves, and is funding an initiative to provide subsidized healthcare to the local population.

Biodiversity The Rimba Raya REDD+ project aims to eliminate the destruction of the forests and peatlands of Central Kalimantan which houses more than 75% of Indonesia’s greenhouse gas emissions. Along with eradicating local deforestation, Rimba Raya works to preserve the endangered species population within the reserve. Rimba Rayahas partnered with renowned Primatologist and Conservationist Dr. Biruté Mary Galdikas to provide natural habitats for endangered orangutans in Borneo. The reserve also funds the Orangutan Foundation International and their Orangutan care center, which aims to reintroduce 300 wild born, rehabilitated orphaned orangutans in its care, back into the wild with the safe confines of the Rimba Raya Reserve.

Education A long term goal of the Rimba Raya Project is to provide all children in and near the concession with an education, providing supplies, uniforms, books and pocket money. Libraries have been constructed in several villages and 3-year scholarships are offered to hard working and dedicated children. Rimba Raya works with local governments to ensure a quality education and fair disbursement of scholarship funds, which have been provided by InfiniteEARTH since 2015. as of 2019, 35 schools are part of this Rimba Raya initiative.

Floating Clinic In an effort to encourage better health practices, Rimba Raya has introduced a floating clinic, providing child nutritional programs and health services to 10 villages along the Seruyan River, within Indonesia's Seruyan Regency. This initiative was introduced in 2016 and provides necessary rural health services which were previously inaccessible and unaffordable to villages in the Rimba Raya concession. The Floating Clinic provides access to nutritional programmes, family planning and prenatal services and offers regular health educational outreach programmes.
