= Global Peatlands Initiative =

- Formation: 2016
- Location: United Nations Avenue, Gigiri, Nairobi, Kenya
- Region served: Global
- Parent organization: United Nations Environment Programme (UN Environment)
- Website: globalpeatlands.org

The Global Peatlands Initiative is an effort made by leading experts and institutions formed in 2016 by 13 founding members at the UNFCCC COP in Marrakech, Morocco. The mission of the Initiative is to protect and conserve peatlands as the world's largest terrestrial organic carbon stock and to prevent it from being emitted into the atmosphere.

Members of the Initiative are working together within their respective areas of expertise to improve the conservation, restoration and sustainable management of peatlands. The Initiative is therefore contributing to several Sustainable Development Goals (SDGs), by keeping carbon stocks in the ground (SDG 13), by avoiding health impacts associated with serious air pollution from burning drained peatlands (SDG 3), by protecting water-related ecosystems and facilitating improved water quality (SDG 6), and by ensuring conservation of ecosystems and threatened species, protecting life on land (SDG 15).

== Context ==
UN Environment Programme's work on the conservation and restoration of peatlands is motivated by their nature as highly efficient and compact carbon sinks. While peatlands cover only 3% of the global land surface, they store nearly 550 billion tonnes of carbon—as much carbon as in all terrestrial biomass and twice as much as in all the world's forests. Considering this, peatlands are one of the greatest allies and potentially one of the quickest wins in the fight against climate change. By conserving and restoring peatlands globally, they can continue to form an essential natural carbon sink and facilitate greenhouse gas emissions reduction.

Despite their value in mitigating climate change, peatlands worldwide are under increased threat from drainage for agriculture, forestry, resource extraction and infrastructure development. The negative implications of the destruction are massive: current greenhouse gas emissions from drained or burning peatlands are estimated to amount to as much as 5% of all anthropogenically-derived emissions—in the range of two billion tonnes of carbon dioxide per year.

Peatlands have so far been identified in 169 countries and they exist extensively in both tropical and temperate zones. The Global Peatlands Initiative encourages actions to keep the carbon locked in peatlands where it is—wet, and in the ground. Drained peatlands must also be rewet to halt ongoing and significant emissions. Preserving peatlands, though, requires knowing their locations, which has been a challenge for scientists.

== History of the Initiative ==
The Global Peatlands Initiative is an international partnership formed by 13 founding members at the UNFCCC COP in Marrakech, Morocco, in late 2016. Its goal is to protect and conserve peatlands as the world's largest terrestrial organic carbon stock. Since then, the Initiative has grown to 49 international organizations with four major tropical peatland countries: Indonesia, the Republic of Congo, the Democratic Republic of the Congo (DRC) and Peru. Its members are working together to improve the conservation, restoration and sustainable management of peatlands globally.

== Areas of work ==
The Global Peatlands Initiative conducts international activities and within four initial partner countries: Indonesia, Peru, Democratic Republic of Congo (DRC) and the Republic of Congo.

The Initiative's global activities are developing an overall outlook on the extent, status and importance of peatlands. This includes a comprehensive picture of peatlands as a core asset in global efforts to mitigate climate change. Global activities include a broad assessment of peatlands' extent and carbon content, followed by a more detailed analysis of sustainable peatland management options, South-South-North cooperation and private sector engagement.

Within the four initial partner countries, the activities focus on supporting a shift in management practices towards a more inclusive and sustainable approach, in order to maximize the contribution of peatlands management to efforts in addressing climate change. The pilot projects also support the transition to a green economy.

== Outcomes ==
In March 2018 and in an unprecedented move, the Democratic Republic of Congo (DRC), the Republic of Congo and Indonesia jointly signed the Brazzaville Declaration on Peatlands, to protect the Cuvette Centrale region in the Congo Basin—the world's largest tropical peatlands—from unregulated land use, and prevent its drainage and degradation. The declaration came as a result of the proceedings of the Third Global Peatlands Initiative meeting of the Partners, formalizing the commitment of the governments to continue to work together and exchange knowledge with the support of the Initiative to promote better management and conservation of this globally important carbon store.

In October 2018, as a direct follow-up to the Brazzaville Declaration on Peatlands (signed during the 3rd meeting of the Global Peatlands Initiative partners in March 2018), partners and countries have been working together to mobilize political will and resources to protect the peatlands in the Congos and in the tropics. As a strong South-South exchange effort on peatlands knowledge, the Minister of Indonesia invited the Ministers of the two Congos and Peru as well as UN Environment to take part in a working week of peatland knowledge exchange. During the meeting, the Minister of the Republic of Congo and representative of Democratic Republic of Congo (DRC) supported a joint declaration for the establishment of the International Tropical Peatland Centre (co-hosted by CIFOR) in Bogor. Indonesia and the Republic of Congo took their partnership one step further and signed a Memorandum of Understanding on Peatlands knowledge and experience sharing to solidify further collaboration. Draft Memoranda of Understanding also exist between Indonesia and Democratic Republic of Congo (DRC) and Indonesia and Peru on support to the Centre and for South-South collaboration. However, the Ministers did not travel to Indonesia and these agreements have not yet been signed.

The United Nations Environment Programme organized on 11–15 March 2019 the fourth United Nations Environment Assembly in Nairobi (Kenya) where Indonesia led the negotiations on the first ever global resolution on peatlands "Conservation and Sustainable Management of Peatlands" adopted with support of all countries. The resolution urges "Member States and other stakeholders to give greater emphasis to the conservation, sustainable management and restoration of peatlands worldwide".

== The partnership ==
The Initiative has grown to 49 international organizations with four major tropical peatland countries of Indonesia, Republic of Congo, Democratic Republic of the Congo (DRC) and Peru.

== Publications ==
=== Smoke on Water: Countering Global Threats from Peatlands Loss and Degradation ===
The Global Peatlands Initiative aims to help build an understanding of the rates, drivers and pathways of peatland ecosystem change. It aims to support countries in making well-informed decisions and to develop management and policy options that minimize impacts on people and the environment and avoid dangerous social and climatic tipping points linked to peatland loss and degradation—such as toxic smoke and haze from peatland fires.

As a first step in filling the information gap, the Initiative launched its first joint product in November 2017—Smoke On Water – Countering Global Threats from Peatland Loss and Degradation. Smoke On Water shares key knowledge from the Initiative to explain both the need to and the opportunity to rapidly protect and restore peatlands.

=== Frontiers 2018/19: Emerging Issues of Environmental Concern ===
The Global Peatlands Initiative co-wrote a chapter the UN Environment's publication: Frontiers 2018/19: Emerging Issues of Environmental Concern launched in March 2019. This chapter: Permafrost Peatlands: Losing Ground in a Warming World, highlights the importance of peatlands on permafrost as a critical carbon-rich biome with their management having far reaching implications on the climate. Indeed, with rising global temperatures, the Arctic is warming twice as fast as the global average and scientists are becoming increasingly alarmed at the accelerating rate of permafrost thaw. Permafrost thaw is now seen as one of the most urgent issues to address as it could precipitate a runaway greenhouse effect if left unabated.

=== Global Peatlands Assessment ===
The Global Peatlands Assessment (GPA) provides a better understanding of what peatlands are, where they are found, what condition they are in and how actions can be taken to protect, restore and sustainably manage them. It also provides a valuable baseline for improvement against future assessments and paves the way for the development of a comprehensive global peatland inventory, as called for in the UNEA4/16 Resolution. It includes an updated Global Peatland Map, Regional Peatland Extent Maps, and other Hotspot Maps to highlight threats and opportunities for peatland management.

A major focus of this assessment is on how better peatland management can be deployed as a nature-based solution to halt biodiversity loss, support climate change adaptation and resilience, mitigate further climate change and support communities to improve the sustainability of their livelihoods living in these landscapes. It has been written to guide countries and decision-makers to advance sustainable peatland management by improving mapping, monitoring, and reporting efforts and to encourage urgent action to integrate peatlands into national climate strategies.

The GPA is the most comprehensive assessment of peatlands to date. It has been developed by the UNEP-led Global Peatlands Initiative and supported by a group of 226 peatland experts from all regions of the globe to establish the state of the world's peatlands.

== See also ==
- United Nations Environment Programme (UN Environment)
- Global Landscapes Forum (GLF)
