= The Trimates =

Jane Goodall, Dian Fossey, and Birutė Galdikas

The Leakey Foundation produced a commemorative poster for a panel presentation by The Trimates at Caltech on May 2, 1981.

The Trimates is the collective name that anthropologist Louis Leakey gave to three women he selected to study primates in their natural environments. Jane Goodall studied chimpanzees; Dian Fossey studied gorillas; and Biruté Galdikas studied orangutans. They are sometimes called Leakey’s Angels.

== Background ==
Louis Leakey's interest in primate ethology stemmed from his attempts to recreate the environment in which the primate, Proconsul, lived in the Rusinga Island region. He saw similarities between this environment and the habitat of the chimpanzees and gorillas. He had been trying to find observers since 1946. In 1956, he sent his secretary, Rosalie Osborn, to Mount Muhabura in Uganda to "help habituate" gorillas, but she returned to England after four months. Leakey was considering taking the job himself when Jane Goodall providentially brought herself to his attention.

To fund Goodall's research at the Gombe Stream Preserve, Leakey created the Tigoni Primate Research Center, north of Nairobi, Kenya, in 1958. With donations from sources including the National Geographic Society and the Wilkie Foundation, the Tigoni Research Center helped secure funding for all three of the women Leakey dubbed the "Trimates". After Kenya achieved independence the center became the National Primate Research Center. It later became the Institute of Primate Research of the National Museums of Kenya, located in Nairobi.

At the time of Leakey's death in 1972, Goodall and Dian Fossey had progressed significantly in their long-term field research in Africa, while Biruté Galdikas was just getting underway with her field studies in Indonesia. A fourth researcher, Toni Jackman, traveled with Leakey with plans to study bonobos, but funding was not secured before Leakey's death and she studied other primates in Kenya.

== Jane Goodall ==
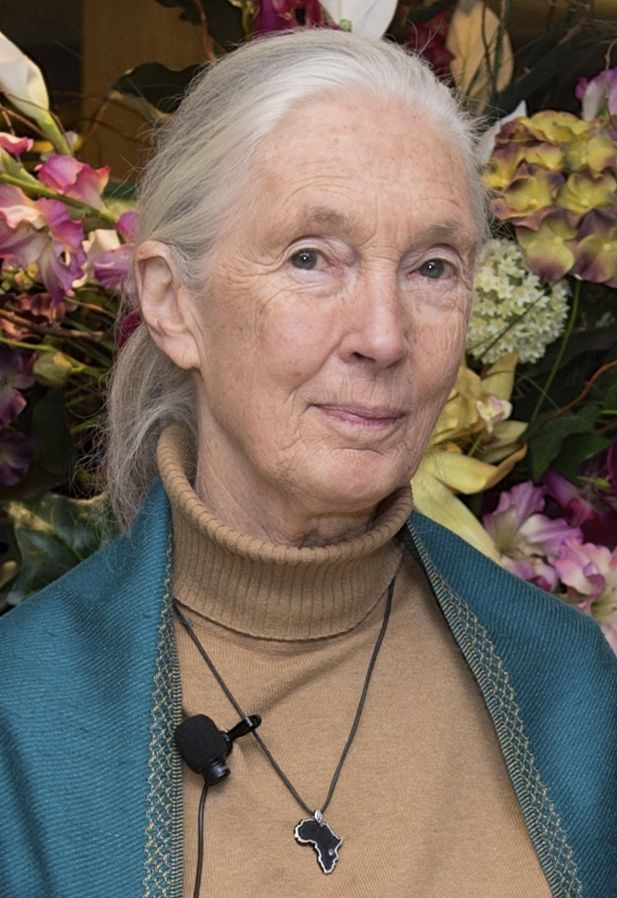
Jane Goodall in 2015

Jane Goodall began her first field study of chimpanzee culture in the Gombe Stream National Park in Tanzania. Goodall had always been passionate about animals and Africa, which brought her to the farm of a friend in the Kenya highlands in 1957. From there, she obtained work as a secretary, but acting on her friend's advice she telephoned Louis Leakey with no other thought than to make an appointment to discuss animals. The call was far-reaching in its impact. Leakey was looking for a chimpanzee researcher but he kept the idea to himself for a time. Instead, he insisted Goodall could work for him as a secretary. After obtaining the approval of his co-researcher and wife, noted British paleoanthropologist Mary Leakey, Louis sent Goodall to Olduvai Gorge, where he confessed his plans. The funds had to be found first.

In 1958, Leakey sent Goodall to London to study primate behavior with Osman Hill and primate anatomy with John Napier. The funds were found in that year, and in 1960 Goodall went to Gombe with her mother Vanne Morris-Goodall. The presence of Vanne was necessary to satisfy the requirements of David Anstey, chief warden, who was concerned for their safety. He cancelled the permit briefly. After Goodall was sent to observe vervet monkeys, the permit was reinstated.

== Dian Fossey ==
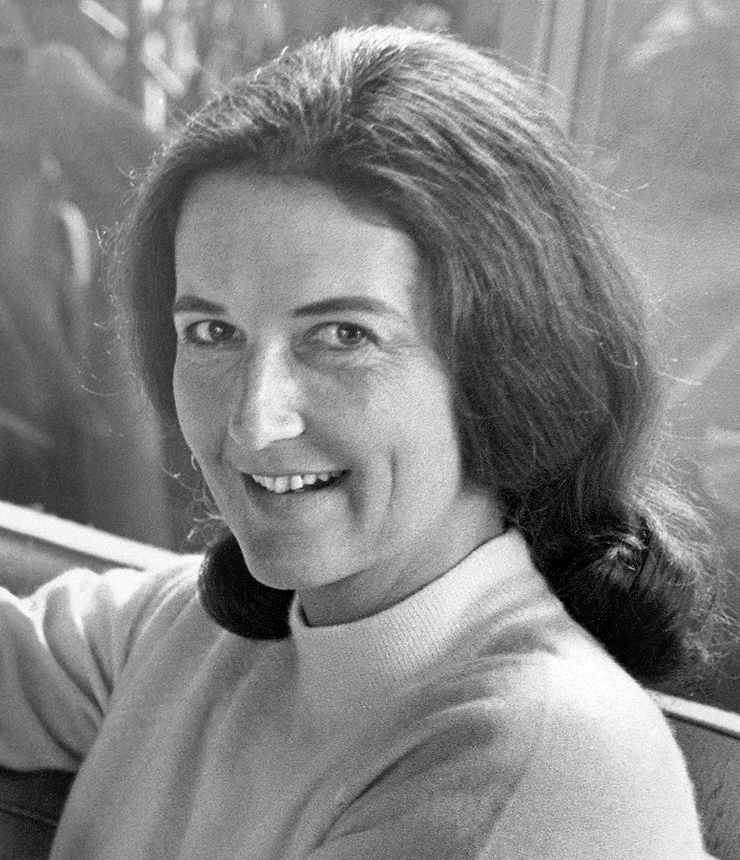
Dian Fossey in 1968

In 1967, Dian Fossey began her extended study of mountain gorillas in the Virunga Mountains of Rwanda. She had lived a somewhat reclusive life as an occupational therapist working with disabled children in California. Earlier she had been interested in veterinary science. In 1963 she decided to seek adventure in Africa and took a trip there with borrowed money. Happening to visit Olduvai, she came to Leakey's attention by spraining her ankle, falling into the excavation, and vomiting on a giraffe fossil.

Fossey returned home to repay the money. In 1966, Leakey happened to be in Louisville lecturing. Fossey attended the lecture, spoke momentarily to Leakey, and to her surprise he remembered her and asked her to stay after the lecture. The next day after an hour's interview at Leakey's hotel, he hired her to observe gorillas, taking up where George Schaller had left off. On January 6, 1967, she arrived at the Virunga Mountains in a Land Rover with Alan Root and a small party and hiked into the mountains, where she set up camp. Root left. Fossey began to succeed in observation almost from the beginning. She seemed to have an empathy with the gorillas, and continued to both study them and defend them from local poachers until her murder in 1985.

== Biruté Galdikas ==
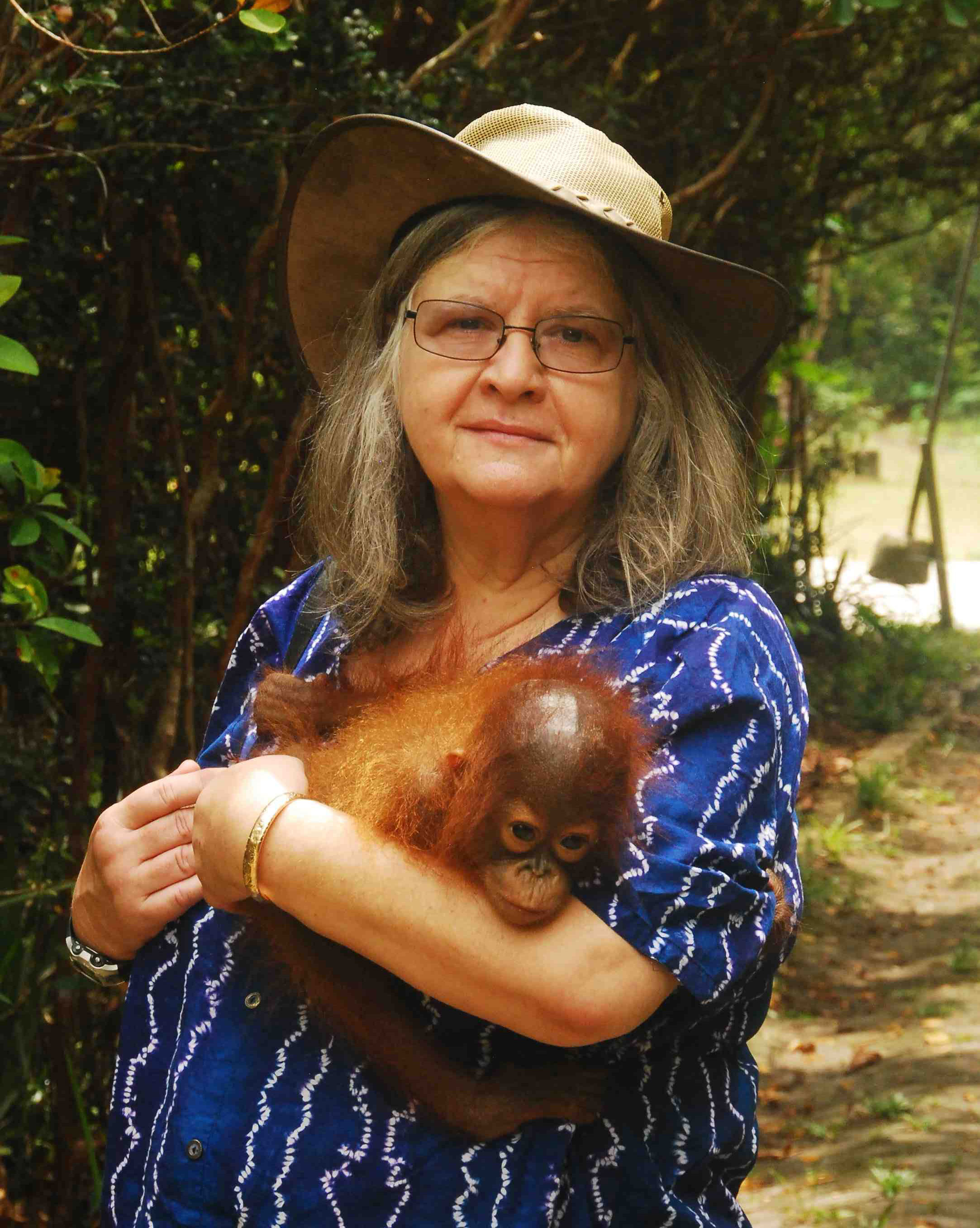
Biruté Galdikas in 2011

Goodall and Fossey were well under way in their study programs in Africa when Biruté Galdikas attended a March 1969 lecture by Leakey at UCLA, where she was a student. She had already formed the intention of studying orangutans, and stayed after the lecture to solicit Leakey's help. In between his conversations with other fans, she managed to tentatively convince him to support her orangutan research. Leakey did wish to find an observer of orangutans and had asked Goodall to do it years before, but Goodall refused, as she was preoccupied by the chimpanzees.

Leakey interviewed Galdikas the next day at the home of Joan and Arnold Travis, Leakey's base in Southern California during his regular lecture tours on the West coast. Leakey accepted the application and over the next months set up an expedition with the necessary permissions. In 1971, she began field studies of orangutans in the jungles of Borneo. Galdikas later established the Orangutan Foundation International in 1986 to promote research, conservation, and public education.

== See also ==
- List of animal rights advocates
