= Converted wetland =

Wetland altered for agriculture production

In the United States a converted wetland is one that has been drained, dredged, filled, leveled, or otherwise altered for the production of an agricultural commodity. The definition is part of The Highly Erodible Land Conservation and Wetland Conservation Compliance provisions (Swampbuster) introduced in the 1985 Farm Bill (also known as The Food Security Act of 1985). The provisions aim to reduce soil loss on erosion-prone lands and to protect wetlands for the multiple benefits they provide.

== Description ==
Under the swampbuster program, converted wetlands are wetlands that were drained or altered to improve agricultural production after December 23, 1985, the date swampbuster was enacted. On lands with this designation, no drainage maintenance and no additional drainage are allowed.

Lands converted before December 23, 1985, are called prior converted wetlands, and alterations to these lands are subject to less stringent requirements. Under swampbuster, there are no restrictions on either drainage maintenance or additional drainage on prior converted wetlands, which are estimated to total more than 50 acres (0.20 km^{2}).

Approximately 48 US states have lost an estimated 53 percent of their original wetlands in the past 200 years. It is estimated that 87 percent of wetland conversions from the mid-1950s to the mid-1970s were due to agricultural conversion. The wetland conservation provisions have reduced wetland conversions and have helped preserve the environmental functions of wetlands, such as flood control, sediment control, groundwater recharge, water quality, wildlife habitat, to name a few.

== See also ==
- Agricultural expansion
- Groundwater-dependent ecosystems
- Wetland conservation
