= InfiniteEARTH =

Hong Kong conservationist land developer

Infinite Earth is a Hong Kong–based project development company specializing in conservation. The company was created in 2008 with the goal of creating the Rimba Raya Biodiversity Reserve, a 64,500-hectare peat swamp in Central Kalimantan, Indonesia. Rimba Raya is the world's largest REDD+ project (Reduced emissions from avoided deforestation and degradation). The project works to eradicate deforestation, and promote conservation of local wildlife and sells carbon credits based on the carbon rich forest.

== Rimba Raya Project ==
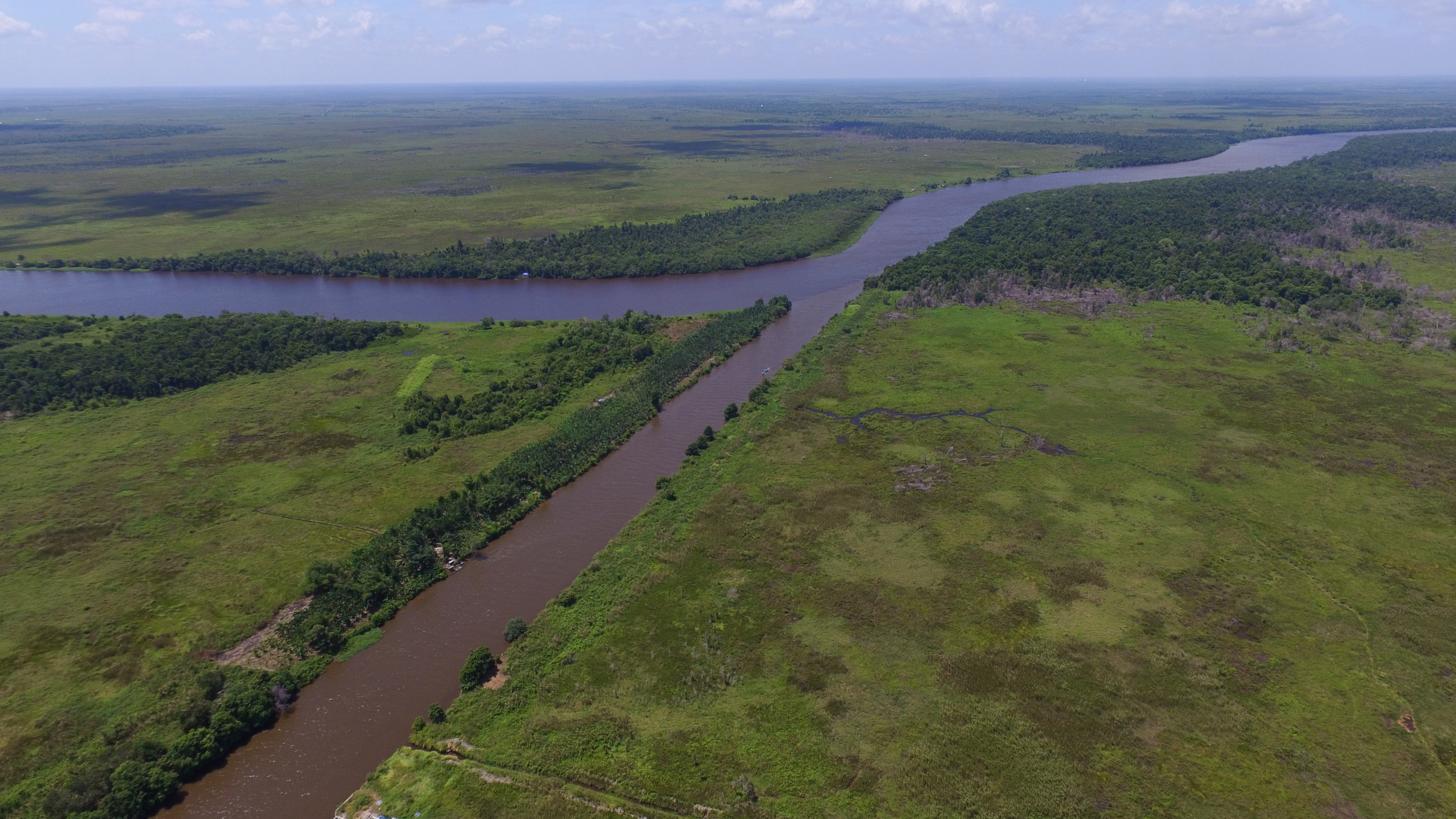
The Rimba Raya Biodiversity Reserve, an InfiniteEARTH Project

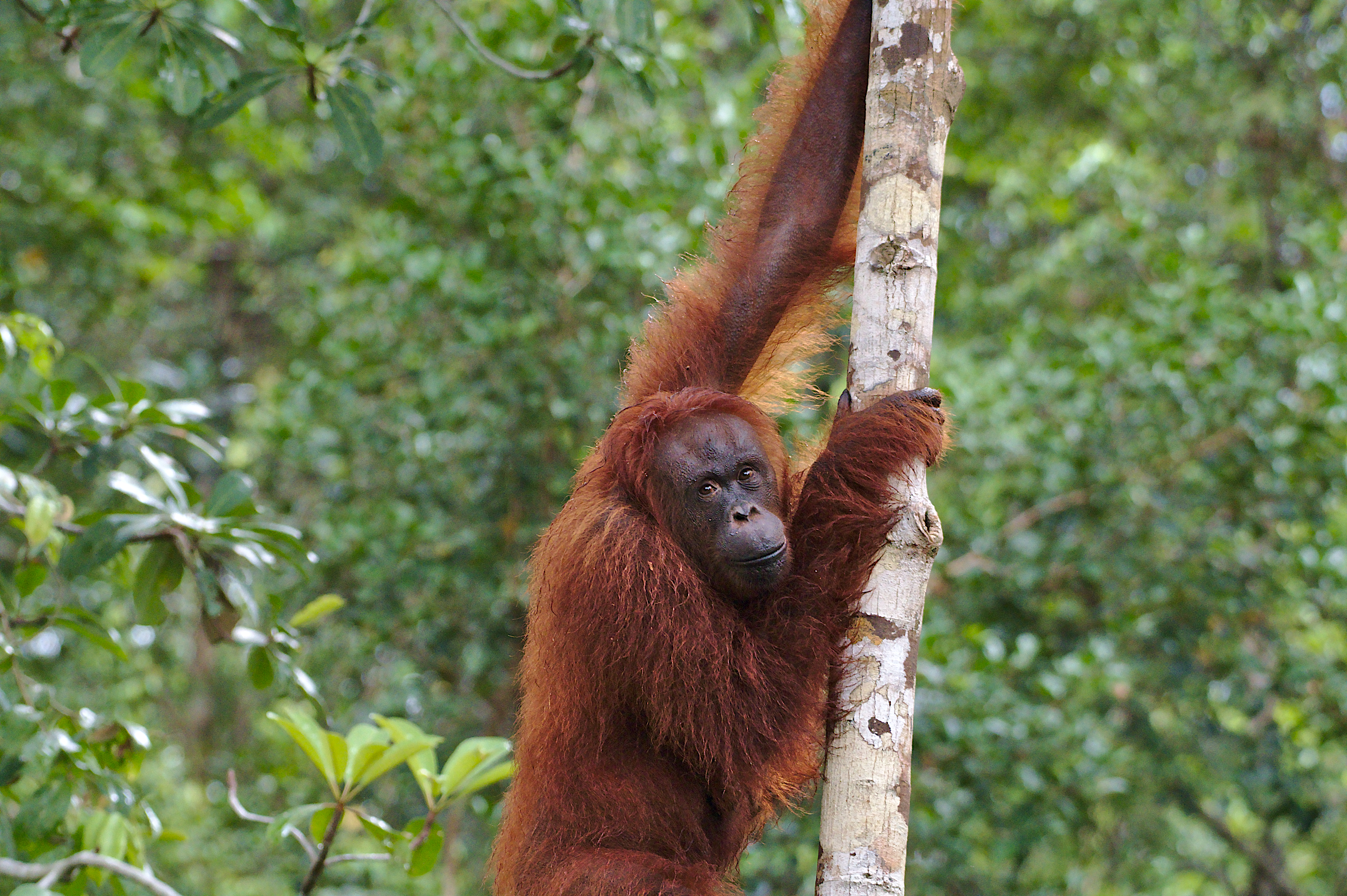
Orangutan in Rimba Raya Biodiversity Reserve

The Rimba Raya Project focuses on environmental conservation, community outreach, and climate control. Through Infinite Earth’s project development, several initiatives have been put into place within the communities that have historically depended (unsustainably) on the forests of Rimba Raya. The main initiatives focus on the welfare of women and children living at the margins within this area. Rimba Raya’s REDD+ program has worked to provide alternative income streams for this forest dependent community.

Rimba Raya develops livelihood programmes in surrounding villages. These programmes work towards addressing all 17 of the United Nations Sustainable Development Goals.

Rimba Raya also works to preserve the endangered species population within the reserve. Rimba Raya has partnered with Primatologist and Conservationist Dr. Biruté Mary Galdikas to provide natural habitats for endangered orangutans in Borneo. The reserve also funds the Orangutan Foundation International and their orangutan care center, which aims to reintroduce 300 wild born, rehabilitated orphaned orangutans in its care, back into the wild within the safe confines of the Rimba Raya Reserve.

== See also ==
- Carbon accounting
