= Risley, Holcroft and Chat Moss National Nature Reserve =

Nature reserve in England

Coordinates: 53°27′43″N 2°27′08″W

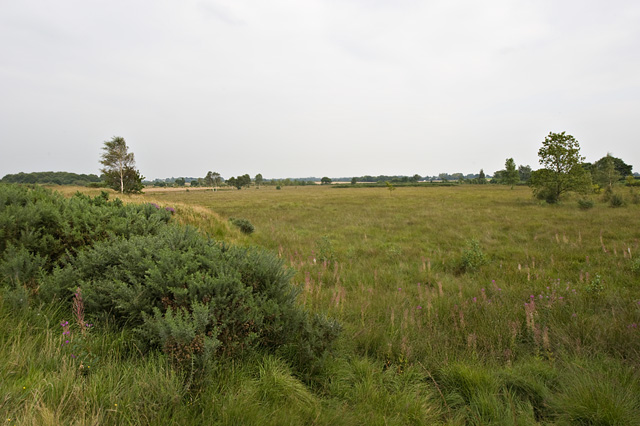
Highfield Moss

Risley, Holcroft and Chat Moss National Nature Reserve is a national nature reserve in Cheshire and Greater Manchester in England, designated in 2025. It consists of eleven sites of varied lowland peat areas.

== Background ==
The King's Series of National Nature Reserves was launched in May 2023, to celebrate the Coronation of Charles III and Camilla, with five major National Nature Reserves named every year for five years, 25 in total. The first was the Lincolnshire Coronation Coast National Nature Reserve.

The Risley, Holcroft and Chat Moss National Nature Reserve is part of the King's Series of National Nature Reserves. It was declared by Natural England on 4 March 2025, and officially launched on 14 July 2025.

== Description ==
Its area is 529 hectares (1,310 acres), lying in the parishes of Birchwood, Culcheth and Glazebury, and Rixton-with-Glazebrook in Cheshire; and in the Metropolitan Boroughs of Salford and Wigan in Greater Manchester.

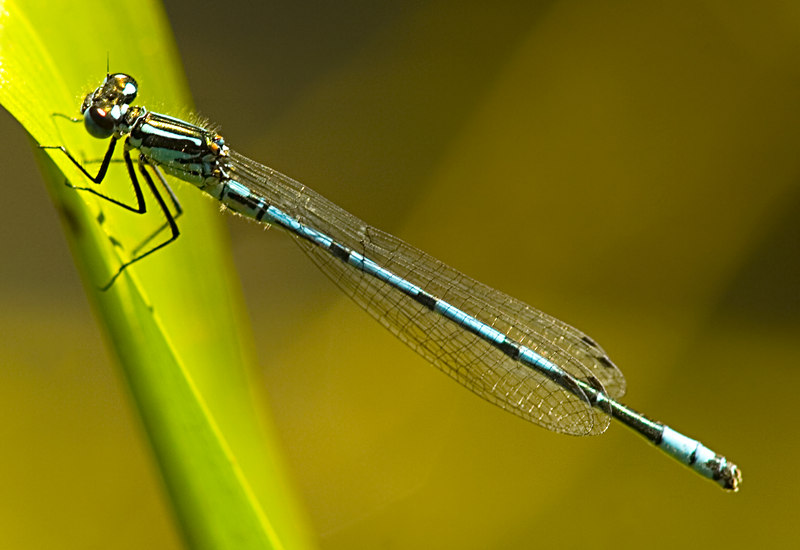
Damselfly at Risley Moss

It consists of eleven sites of varied lowland peat areas, including raised bog, fen, lowland heath and wet woodland. It includes Risley Moss, a local nature reserve in Cheshire; Holcroft Moss, a nature reserve of the Cheshire Wildlife Trust; and four nature reserves of the Wildlife Trust for Lancashire, Manchester and North Merseyside: Cadishead and Little Woolden Moss, Astley Moss, Rindle Moss and Highfield Moss.

The reserve is managed by Natural England, Cheshire Wildlife Trust, Forestry England, The Wildlife Trust for Lancashire, Manchester and North Merseyside, Warrington Borough Council, Wigan Council and Woodland Trust.

Mary Creagh, the Parliamentary Under-Secretary of State for Nature, said: "This beautiful landscape will now have the chance to recover and thrive, after centuries of damage.... This Government is committed to turning the tide on nature’s decline after years of neglect as part of our plan for change. New National Nature Reserves deliver on our promise to improve access to nature and protect nature-rich habitats, such as peatlands."

Tony Juniper, chair of Natural England, said: "This part of England led the world in industrial innovation and today it shows leadership in nature recovery. Nature is vital for our health, wealth and security and this new reserve reveals the huge potential for meeting modern challenges through natural solutions."

== See also ==
- Chat Moss
- National nature reserves in England
- Peatland restoration
- Wetland conservation
