= Lancashire Wildlife Trust =

Conservation charity in England

- Abbreviation: LWT
- Formation: 1962
- Type: Conservation charity
- Legal status: Registered Charity (No. 229325)
- Headquarters: Bamber Bridge, Preston
- Affiliations: The Wildlife Trusts
- Website: Official site

The Lancashire Wildlife Trust or Wildlife Trust for Lancashire, Manchester and North Merseyside is a wildlife trust covering the county of Lancashire and parts of Greater Manchester and Merseyside in England.

It includes all of the ceremonial county of Lancashire, including the unitary authority districts of Blackburn with Darwen and Blackpool; from Greater Manchester the districts of Bolton, Bury, Manchester, Oldham, Rochdale, Salford and Wigan; and from Merseyside the districts of Liverpool, Sefton, Knowsley and St Helens. It also covers adjacent areas of the Irish Sea including parts of Morecambe Bay and Liverpool Bay.

The trust is part of the Wildlife Trusts partnership, which is the UK's leading conservation charity dedicated to all wildlife. The network of 47 local Wildlife Trusts and its junior branch, Wildlife Watch, work together with local communities to protect wildlife in all habitats across the UK, in towns, countryside, wetlands and seas.

The trust's mission is to work towards a region richer in wildlife by creating, restoring, connecting and enhancing habitats; to help people connect to nature and encourage them to take action to protect it; and to work towards public recognition that a healthy environment rich in wildlife is essential for human health and wellbeing.

The trust's HQ and Lancashire Office is in Cuerden Valley Park south of Bamber Bridge, near Preston. Its Greater Manchester Office is in east Bolton and its Merseyside Office is within the Port of Liverpool.

== History ==
The trust was formed as the Lancashire Naturalists' Trust in 1962 by a group of naturalists who wanted to help protect the wildlife of Lancashire. It is now the leading local environmental charity in this region. Following the local government reforms of 1974 it transferred its remit and tenure in Furness to the newly constituted Cumbria Wildlife Trust. It was renamed the Lancashire Trust for Nature Conservation in 1980, and the Lancashire Wildlife Trust in 1992. The Charity Commission's record also lists The Lancashire Trust for Nature Conservation with Greater Manchester and Merseyside as a former name, and The Wildlife Trust (Lancashire, Manchester, N. Merseyside) as a working name.

== Nature Reserves ==
As of July 2026, the Trust manages over 1,288 hectares of land for wildlife across more than 40 nature reserves and other sites. These include:

- Brockholes nature reserve, near Preston, which opened in 2011. The Trust's flagship reserve, Brockholes sits on 250 acres of a former quarry site near junction 31 of the M6 motorway next to the River Ribble, and has an award-winning floating visitor centre, cafe, play area and accessible nature trails. The reserve's mosaic of habitats include lakes, pools, ancient woodland, reedbeds and grassland.
- Mere Sands Wood, near Rufford, a SSSI nature reserve comprising a variety of wetland, meadow and woodland habitats across 105 acres. The reserve has accessible wildlife trails and hides, a visitor centre and cafe.
- Lunt Meadows, in Merseyside, a wetland nature reserve on the banks of the River Alt. The reserve doubles as a flood storage reservoir and is also a Mesolithic archeological site. Lunt Meadows comprises a variety of habitats including grasslands, meadows, reedbeds, ponds and pools.

Other nature reserves include:

- Cadishead and Little Woolden Moss
- Highfield Moss
- Salthill Quarry
- Warton Crag
- Winmarleigh and Cockerham Moss

== Projects ==
The Trust's projects include:

- Fylde Sand Dunes Project, a partnership project with Fylde Council and Blackpool Council, funded by the Environment Agency until 2027. The project aims to restore and expand the existing sand dunes along the Fylde coast as a sea defence and wildlife habitat, as well as educating the local community of the dunes' importance through educational sessions, guided walks and talks.
- Species reintroduction projects including efforts to bring back the white-faced darter dragonfly and bog bush cricket to key sites in the region. Successful reintroduction of the large heath butterfly to Greater Manchester was achieved after the species was locally extinct for over 100 years. As part of the Fylde Sand Dunes project, 412 captive-bred sand lizard hatchlings were successfully released into the dunes between 2017-2021.
- Championing Nature, a multi-year project focused on increasing people's connection to nature amongst communities in Wythenshawe through educational sessions, activities and community events. The project is delivered alongside London Wildlife Trust, Birmingham and Black Country Wildlife Trust and Northumberland Wildlife Trust, and is funded by Emirates and The All England Tennis Club.
- The Lancashire Peat Partnership, which is co-ordinated by LWT and Forest of Bowland National Landscape, and delivered alongside a network of partners. This project aims to restore and re-wet degraded peatlands across the region, as well as engaging with local communities about the importance of peatlands. The Trust has undertaken extensive restoration works on sites including Darwen Moor and Aushaw Moss in the West Pennine Moors.
- LWT's peatland programme also undertakes restoration works at key lowland sites across the region. This includes working with local farmers on wetter farming (paludiculture) trials at Chat Moss in Greater Manchester and Gore House Farm near Liverpool. Crops grown as part of these trials include blueberries, lettuce, radishes and bulrushes (typha). The Trust also manages Winmarleigh carbon farm, a pioneering project aiming to restore the carbon storage capacity of lowland agricultural peatlands.
- The Trust's red squirrel conservation efforts aim to preserve the region's remaining red squirrel population in its small stronghold area within North Merseyside and West Lancashire. This work includes regular species monitoring, research, habitat management, rehabilitation of orphaned red squirrels, and working with local landowners and volunteers to reduce threats from grey squirrels.
- The Trust is also part of the Red Squirrel Recovery Network, a project delivered alongside a network of partners including Northumberland Wildlife Trust, Cumbria Wildlife Trust, Knowsley Safari Foundation, the UK Squirrel Accord, Bright Green Nature, and the Galloway & Southern Ayrshire Biosphere partnership. This five-year project aims to bring partners and local volunteer groups together over a larger geographical area to work together, share data, create a network of citizen scientists, develop methodology for grey squirrel fertility control, and educate the public about the challenges facing red squirrels.

== Education ==
Education forms a large part of the Trust's work. The Trust's Education team hosts regular school visits at its sites including Brockholes, Mere Sands Wood and Lunt Meadows, teaching children about local wildlife and habitats. It also runs Forest School and Beach school sessions, as well as outreach visits where education staff run outdoor learning sessions at local schools.

In addition, the Trust runs Forest School training and Outdoor Learning CPD training courses for local teachers and education professionals, enabling them to deliver nature-based learning sessions in their own schools.
