= Highfield Moss =

Nature reserve in Greater Manchester, England

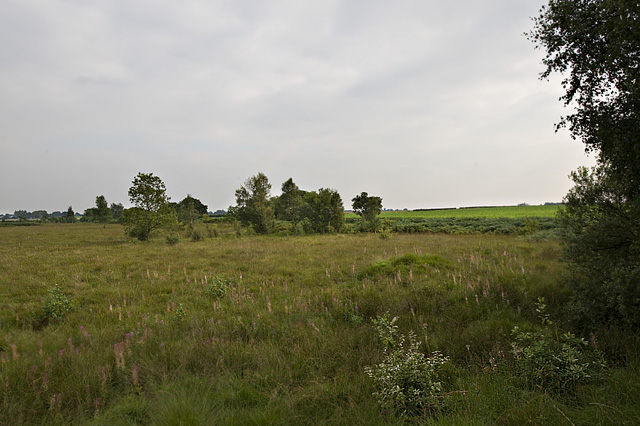

- Location within Greater Manchester
- OS grid: SJ 614 956
- Coordinates: 53°27′17″N 2°35′05″W
- Area: 17.9 hectares (44 acres)
- Operator: Wildlife Trust for Lancashire, Manchester and North Merseyside
- Designation: Site of Special Scientific Interest
- Website: www.lancswt.org.uk/nature-reserves/highfield-moss

Highfield Moss is a nature reserve of the Wildlife Trust for Lancashire, Manchester and North Merseyside, near Lowton in the Metropolitan Borough of Wigan, Greater Manchester. It is designated a Site of Special Scientific Interest.

== Description ==
The area, of size 17.9 hectares (44 acres), is a lowland raised mire, an unusual type of wetland among those in the Greater Manchester area, with diverse habitats over deep peat, including wet heath, tall fen and standing water.

Peatlands are important, because they store carbon dioxide, which has been absorbed over thousands of years, whereas degraded peatland emits carbon dioxide; and peatlands reduce flooding by soaking up water. Restoration is also important for species of wildlife which are adapted to this particular environment, and which would otherwise disappear.

There is access to the reserve by public footpaths.

== Wildlife ==
The Liverpool and Manchester Railway, built by George Stephenson between 1826 and 1830, crosses the area; heaps of sand left by the construction are occupied by several species of bees including tawny mining bees and buffish mining bees.

There are several pools where dragonflies and damselflies can be seen such as black darter, common hawker, four-spotted chaser and emerald damselfly.

Birds which may be seen include whitethroats, linnets, hobbies and kestrels.

Plants in the reserve include in particular the marsh gentian, which is generally rare in the UK, and because of the diverse habitats there is a variety of species, including species rarely found in the Greater Manchester area, such as petty whin, false fox-sedge, cross-leaved heath and lousewort.

== Inclusion in national nature reserve ==
The reserve in one of the sites included in the Risley, Holcroft and Chat Moss National Nature Reserve, a national nature reserve created in 2025, consisting of eleven sites of varied lowland peat areas in Greater Manchester and Cheshire.

== See also ==
- Peatland restoration
- Wetland conservation
