= Marsh =

Low-lying and seasonally waterlogged land

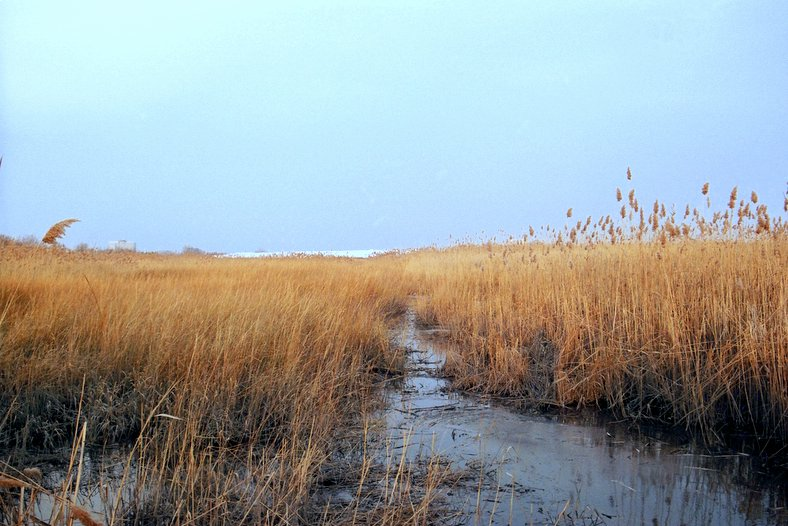
Marshlands are often noted within wetlands, as seen here in the New Jersey Meadowlands at Lyndhurst, New Jersey, U.S.

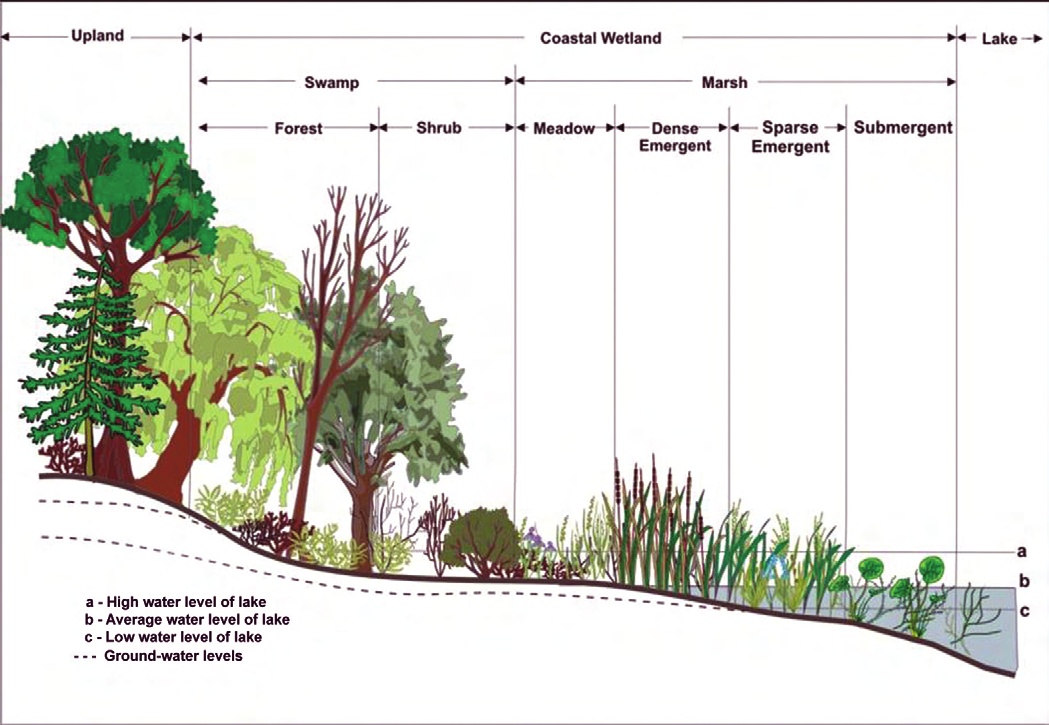
Marsh in shallow water on a lakeshore

In ecology, a marsh is a wetland that is dominated by herbaceous plants rather than by woody plants. More in general, the word can be used for any low-lying and seasonally waterlogged terrain. In Europe and in agricultural literature, low-lying meadows that require draining and embanked polderlands are also referred to as marshes or marshland.

Marshes can often be found at the edges of lakes and streams, where they form a transition between the aquatic and terrestrial ecosystems. They are often dominated by grasses, rushes or reeds. If woody plants are present they tend to be low-growing shrubs, and the marsh is sometimes called a carr. This form of vegetation is what differentiates marshes from other types of wetland such as swamps, which are dominated by trees, and mires, which are wetlands that have accumulated deposits of acidic peat.

Marshes provide habitats for many kinds of invertebrates, fish, amphibians, waterfowl and aquatic mammals. This biological productivity means that marshes contain 0.1% of global sequestered terrestrial carbon. Moreover, they have an outsized influence on climate resilience of coastal areas and waterways, absorbing high tides and other water changes due to extreme weather. Though some marshes are expected to migrate upland, most natural marshlands will be threatened by sea level rise and associated erosion.

== Basic information ==
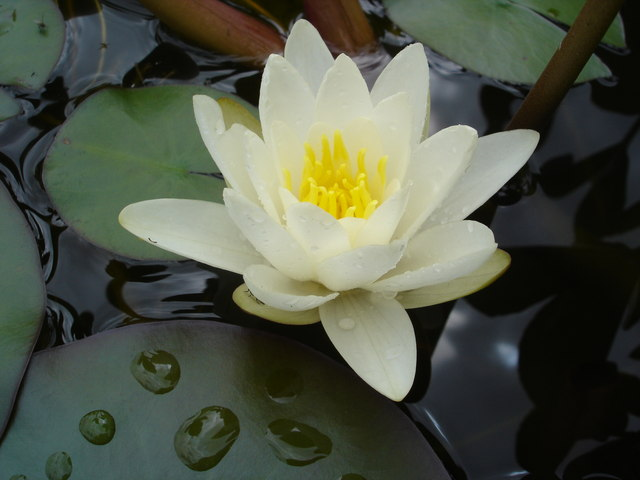
White water lilies are a typical marsh plant in European areas of deeper water.

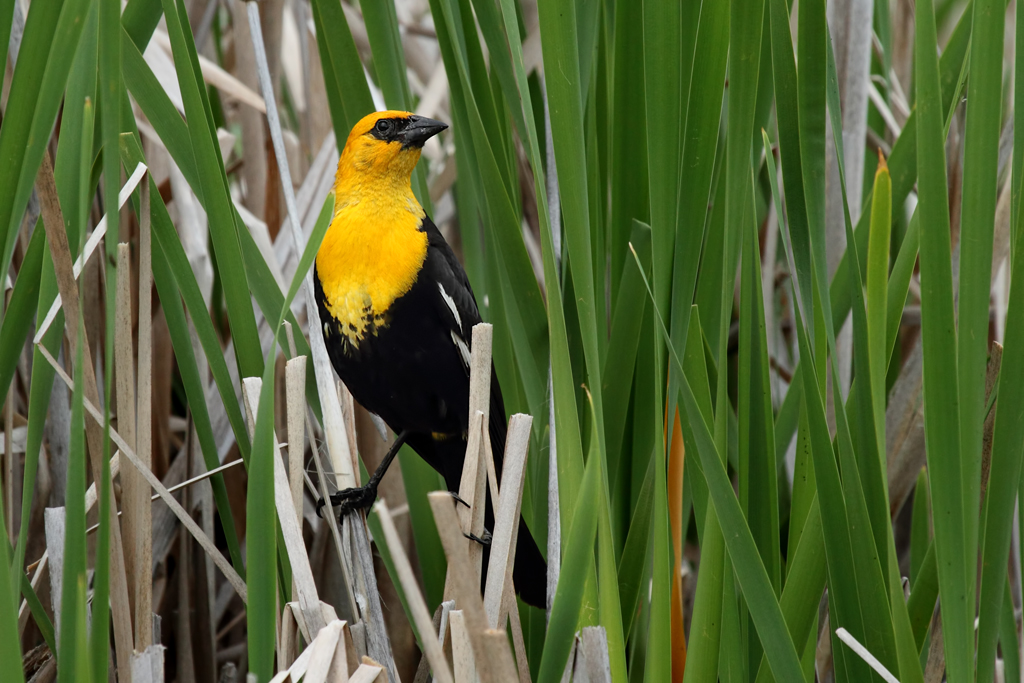
Many kinds of birds nest in marshes; this one is a yellow-headed blackbird.

Marshes provide a habitat for many species of plants, animals, and insects that have adapted to living in flooded conditions or other environments. The plants must be able to survive in wet mud with low oxygen levels. Many of these plants, therefore, have aerenchyma, channels within the stem that allow air to move from the leaves into the rooting zone. Marsh plants also tend to have rhizomes for underground storage and reproduction. Common examples include cattails, sedges, papyrus and sawgrass. Aquatic animals, from fish to salamanders, are generally able to live with a low amount of oxygen in the water. Some can obtain oxygen from the air instead, while others can live indefinitely in conditions of low oxygen. The pH in marshes tends to be neutral to alkaline, as opposed to bogs, where peat accumulates under more acid conditions.

Hassocks or tussocks are firmer clumps of vegetation in marshy or boggy ground.

== Values and ecosystem services ==
Marshes provide habitats for many kinds of invertebrates, fish, amphibians, waterfowl and aquatic mammals. Marshes have extremely high levels of biological production, some of the highest in the world, and therefore are important in supporting fisheries.

Marshes also improve water quality by acting as a sink to filter pollutants and sediment from the water that flows through them. Marshes partake in water purification by providing nutrient and pollution consumption. Marshes (and other wetlands) are able to absorb water during periods of heavy rainfall and slowly release it into waterways and therefore reduce the magnitude of flooding. Marshes also provide the services of tourism, recreation, education, and research.

== Types of marshes ==
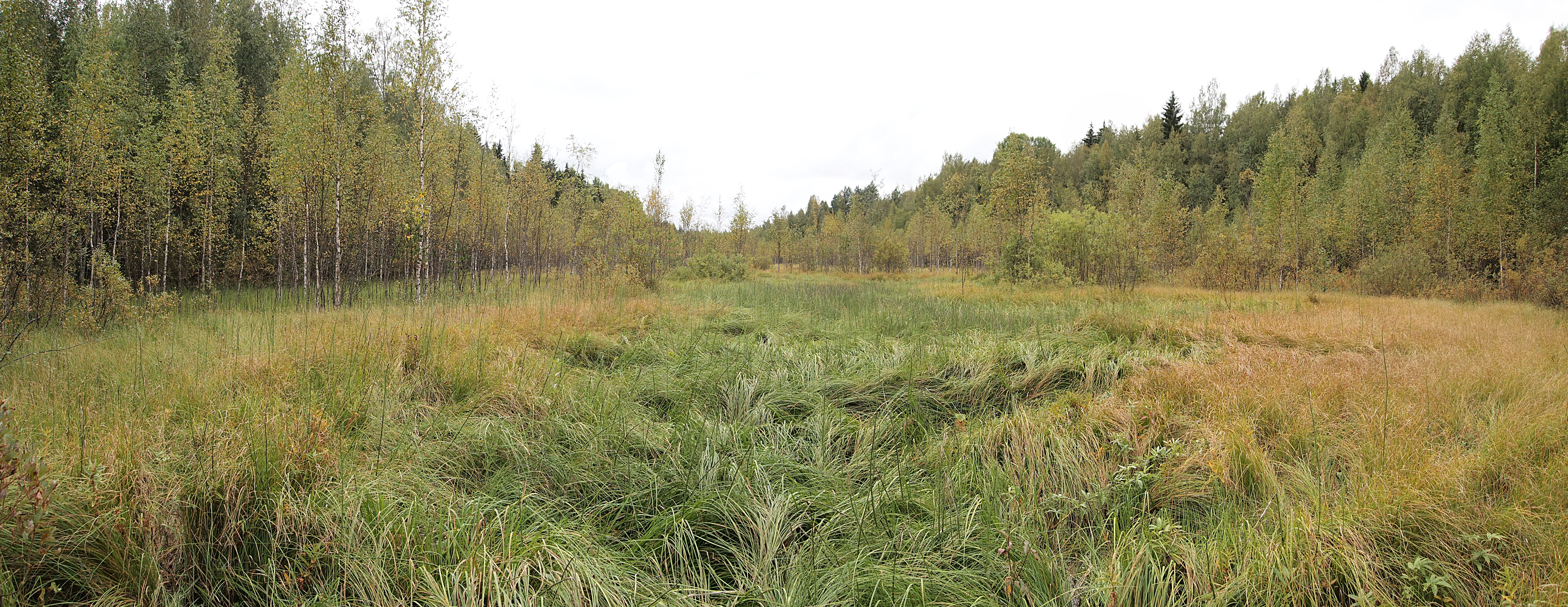
A marsh in Jyväskylä, Finland

Marshes differ depending mainly on their location and salinity. These factors greatly influence the range and scope of animal and plant life that can survive and reproduce in these environments. The three main types of marsh are salt marshes, freshwater tidal marshes, and freshwater marshes. These three can be found worldwide, and each contains a different set of organisms.

=== Salt marshes ===
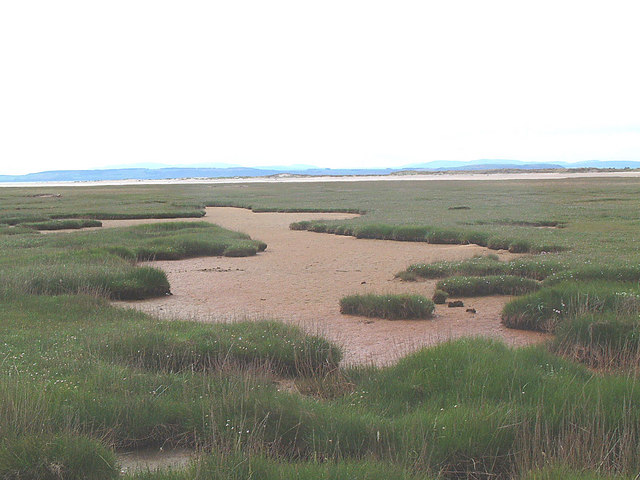
A salt marsh in Scotland

Saltwater marshes are found around the world in mid to high latitudes, wherever there are sections of protected coastline. They are located close enough to the shoreline that the motion of the tides affects them, and, sporadically, they are covered with water. They flourish where the rate of sediment buildup is greater than the rate at which the land level is sinking. Salt marshes are dominated by specially adapted rooted vegetation, primarily salt-tolerant grasses.

Salt marshes are most commonly found in lagoons, estuaries, and on the sheltered side of a shingle or sandspit. The currents there carry the fine particles around to the quiet side of the spit, and sediment begins to build up. These locations allow the marshes to absorb the excess nutrients from the water running through them before they reach the oceans and estuaries. These marshes are slowly declining. Coastal development and urban sprawl have caused significant loss of these essential habitats.

=== Freshwater tidal marshes ===
Although considered a freshwater marsh, the ocean tides affect this form of marsh. However, without the stresses of salinity at work in its saltwater counterpart, the diversity of the plants and animals that live in and use freshwater tidal marshes is much higher than in salt marshes. The most severe threats to this form of marsh are the increasing size and pollution of the cities surrounding them.

=== Freshwater marshes ===
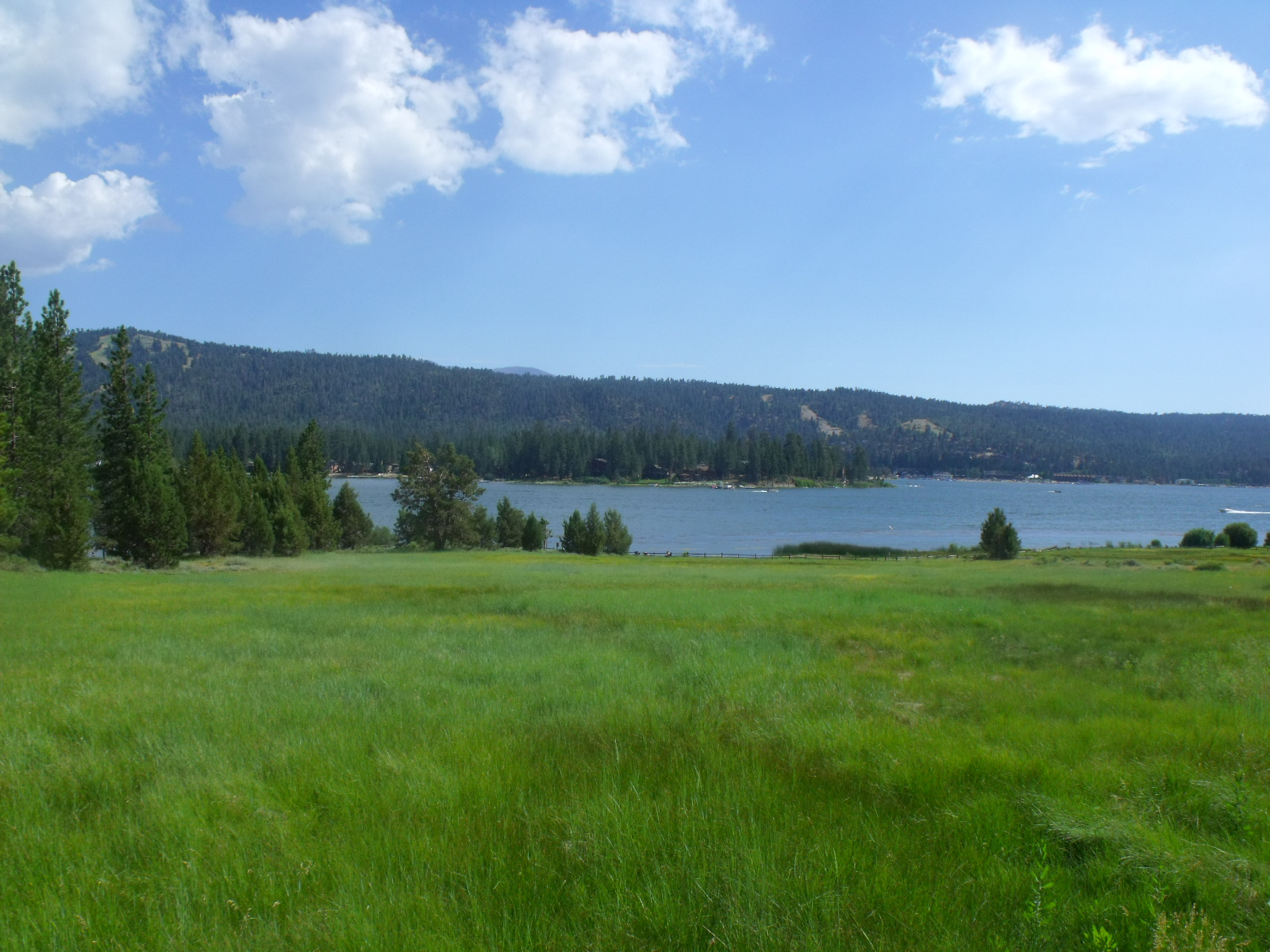
A wet meadow adjacent to Big Bear Lake, San Bernardino Mountains, California

Ranging greatly in size and geographic location, freshwater marshes make up North America's most common form of wetland. They are also the most diverse of the three types of marsh. Some examples of freshwater marsh types in North America are:

==== Wet meadows ====
Wet meadows occur in shallow lake basins, low-lying depressions, and the land between shallow marshes and upland areas. They also happen on the edges of large lakes and rivers. Wet meadows often have very high plant diversity and high densities of buried seeds. They are regularly flooded but are often dry in the summer.

==== Vernal pools ====
Vernal pools are a type of marsh found only seasonally in shallow depressions in the land. They can be covered in shallow water, but in the summer and fall, they can be completely dry. In western North America, vernal pools tend to form in open grasslands, whereas in the east, they often occur in forested landscapes. Further south, vernal pools form in pine savannas and flatwoods. Many amphibian species depend upon vernal pools for spring breeding; these ponds provide a habitat free from fish, which eat the eggs and young of amphibians. An example is the endangered gopher frog. Similar temporary ponds occur in other world ecosystems, where they may have local names. However, vernal pool can be applied to all such temporary pool ecosystems.

==== Playa lakes ====
Playa lakes are a form of shallow freshwater marsh in the southern high plains of the United States. Like vernal pools, they are only present at certain times of the year and generally have a circular shape. As the playa dries during the summer, conspicuous plant zonation develops along the shoreline.

=== Prairie potholes ===
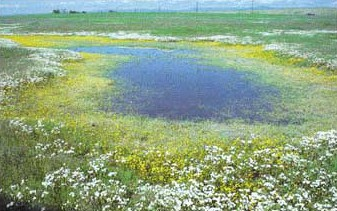
Vernal pools are ponded only during the wetter part of the year.

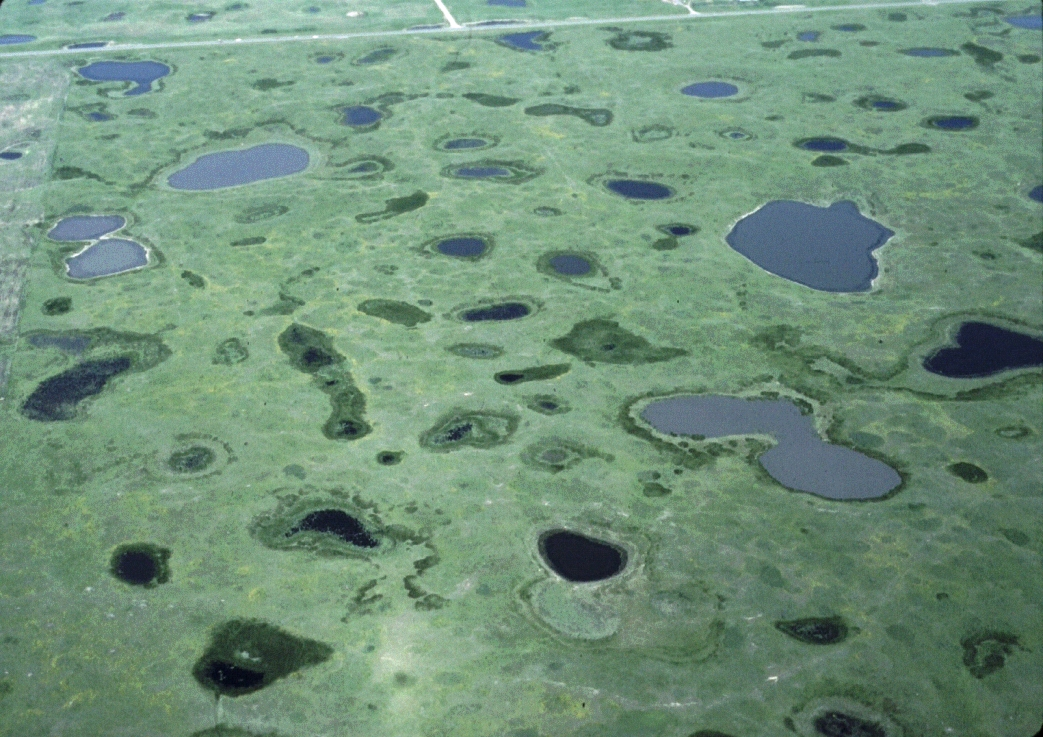
Aerial view of prairie potholes

Prairie potholes are found in northern North America, such as the Prairie Pothole Region. Glaciers once covered these landscapes, and as a result, shallow depressions were formed in great numbers. These depressions fill with water in the spring. They provide important breeding habitats for many species of waterfowl. Some pools only occur seasonally, while others retain enough water to be present all year.

=== Riverine wetlands ===
Many kinds of marsh occur along the fringes of large rivers. The different types are produced by factors such as water level, nutrients, ice scour, and waves.

=== Embanked marshlands ===
Large tracts of tidal marsh have been embanked and artificially drained. They are usually known by the Dutch name of polders. In Northern Germany and Scandinavia they are called Marschland, Marsch or marsk; in France marais maritime. In the Netherlands and Belgium, they are designated as marine clay districts. In East Anglia, a region in the East of England, the embanked marshes are also known as Fens.

== Restoration ==
Some areas have already lost 90% of their wetlands, including marshes. They have been drained to create agricultural land or filled to accommodate urban sprawl. Restoration is returning marshes to the landscape to replace those lost in the past. Restoration can be done on a large scale, such as by allowing rivers to flood naturally in the spring, or on a small scale by returning wetlands to urban landscapes.

== See also ==
- Aquatic plant – Plant that has adapted to living in an aquatic environment
- Bayou – Body of water in flat, low-lying areas
- Marsh gas – Gas produced naturally within marshes, swamps and bogs
- Mire – Wetland terrain without forest cover, dominated by living, peat-forming plants
- Bog – Type of wetland with peat-rich soil
- Fen – Type of wetland fed by mineral-rich ground or surface water
- Swamp – Forested wetland
- Tidal marsh – Marsh subject to tidal change in water
- Freshwater marsh – Non-tidal, non-forested marsh wetland that contains fresh water
- Mangrove – Productive wetlands that occur in coastal intertidal zones
- Paludiculture – Wet agriculture and forestry on peatlands
