= Astley and Bedford Mosses =

Peat bogs in Greater Manchester, England

- Site of Special Scientific Interest
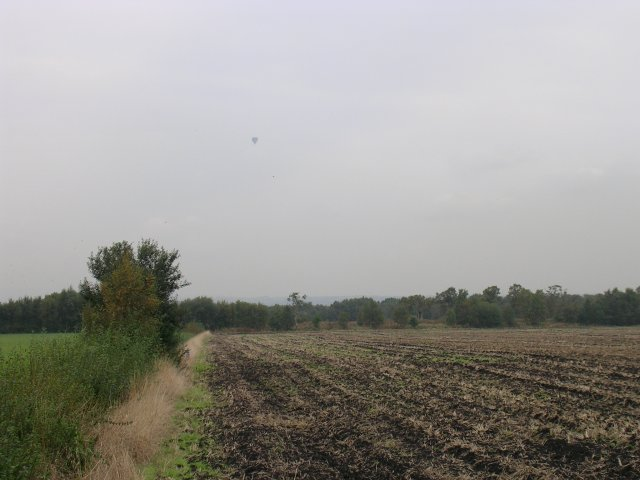
- Looking west across fields on Astley Moss

- Location within Greater Manchester
- Location of Astley and Bedford Mosses.
- Area of search: Greater Manchester
- Grid reference: SJ 691 975
- Coordinates: 53°28′22″N 2°27′02″W
- Interest: Biological
- Area: 228 acres (92 ha; 0.36 sq mi)
- Notification date: 1989

Astley and Bedford Mosses are areas of peat bog south of the Bridgewater Canal and north of the Liverpool and Manchester Railway. They are situated about 2 1/2 miles (4 km) south-east of Leigh, in Astley and Bedford, Greater Manchester, England. They are among the last remaining fragments of Chat Moss, the raised bog that once covered a large area, of around 10 2/3 square miles (28 km^{2}), south Lancashire north of the River Mersey. Astley Moss was designated a Site of Special Scientific Interest in 1989. Astley and Bedford Mosses, along with Risley Moss and Holcroft Moss, are part of Manchester Mosses, a European Union designated Special Area of Conservation.

== Ecology ==
Chat Moss, a lowland raised bog, formed after the last ice age about 10,000 years ago on the site of a shallow glacial lake to the north of the River Mersey. Fen peat formed in an area colonised by reeds and rushes. Sphagnum mosses then colonised the area causing a change from fen to bog peat which became elevated forming a dome, the raised bog. Sphagnum mosses increase the acidity of the water resulting in highly specialised plant species, many of them found nowhere else. The site is also important for bird species such as the merlin, hen harrier and short-eared owl.
