= Winmarleigh and Cockerham Moss =

Nature reserve in Lancashire, England

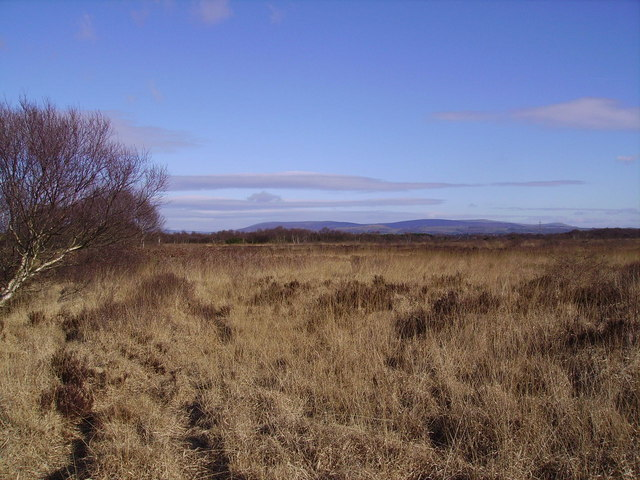
- Winmarleigh Moss

- Location within Lancashire
- Type: Peatland
- OS grid: SD 44 47
- Coordinates: 53°54′58″N 2°51′14″W
- Area: 90 hectares (220 acres)
- Operator: Wildlife Trust for Lancashire, Manchester and North Merseyside
- Designation: Site of Special Scientific Interest
- Website: www.lancswt.org.uk/nature-reserves/winmarleigh-cockerham-moss

Winmarleigh and Cockerham Moss is a nature reserve of the Wildlife Trust for Lancashire, Manchester and North Merseyside, west of Garstang and between the villages of Winmarleigh and Cockerham, which is being restored to its former state of peatland.

== Description ==
It was formerly an area of lowland raised bog dating back several thousand years; it was converted into agricultural land in more recent times, by creating a network of drainage channels, and peat was extracted. In the 1990s, supported by English Nature, work started to restore the land. Cockerham Moss and the adjoining Winmarleigh Moss were bought by Wildlife Trust for Lancashire, Manchester and North Merseyside in 2010 and 2012. It is a Site of Special Scientific Interest.

Peatlands are important, because they store carbon dioxide, which has been absorbed over thousands of years, whereas degraded peatland emits carbon dioxide; and peatlands reduce flooding by soaking up water. Restoration is also important for species of wildlife which are adapted to this particular environment, and which would otherwise disappear.

Sphagnum moss has been reintroduced, and bog cranberry can be seen. Wildlife to be seen includes common lizards. Plants introduced in Winmarleigh Moss include several species of sundew, bog asphodel, and white beak sedge which is an important source of nectar for the locally rare large heath butterfly.

== Access ==
There is no general access; however, a public footpath runs through the middle of the site.

== Carbon farm project ==
A "carbon farm" has been created on Winmarleigh Moss, as part of Care-Peat, a project funded by Interreg North-West Europe to test new techniques in carbon reduction, and carried out by nature organisations in Belgium, France, Ireland, the Netherlands, and the UK. The project on this site was done with partners Manchester Metropolitan University, and Beadamoss, a supplier of suitable species of sphagnum moss. On a 2 hectares (4.9 acres) site, a 10 centimetres (4 in) layer of topsoil was removed; drainage ditches were blocked and the water table was raised by building walls of compacted peat; a solar-powered irrigation system was installed; and sphagnum moss was planted. The moss absorbs carbon and will eventually form peat. The Care-Peat project ended in 2023. It is hoped that carbon farms can be created elsewhere, to restore more peatlands.

== See also ==
- Peatland restoration
- Wetland conservation
