= Cadishead and Little Woolden Moss =

Nature reserve in Greater Manchester, England

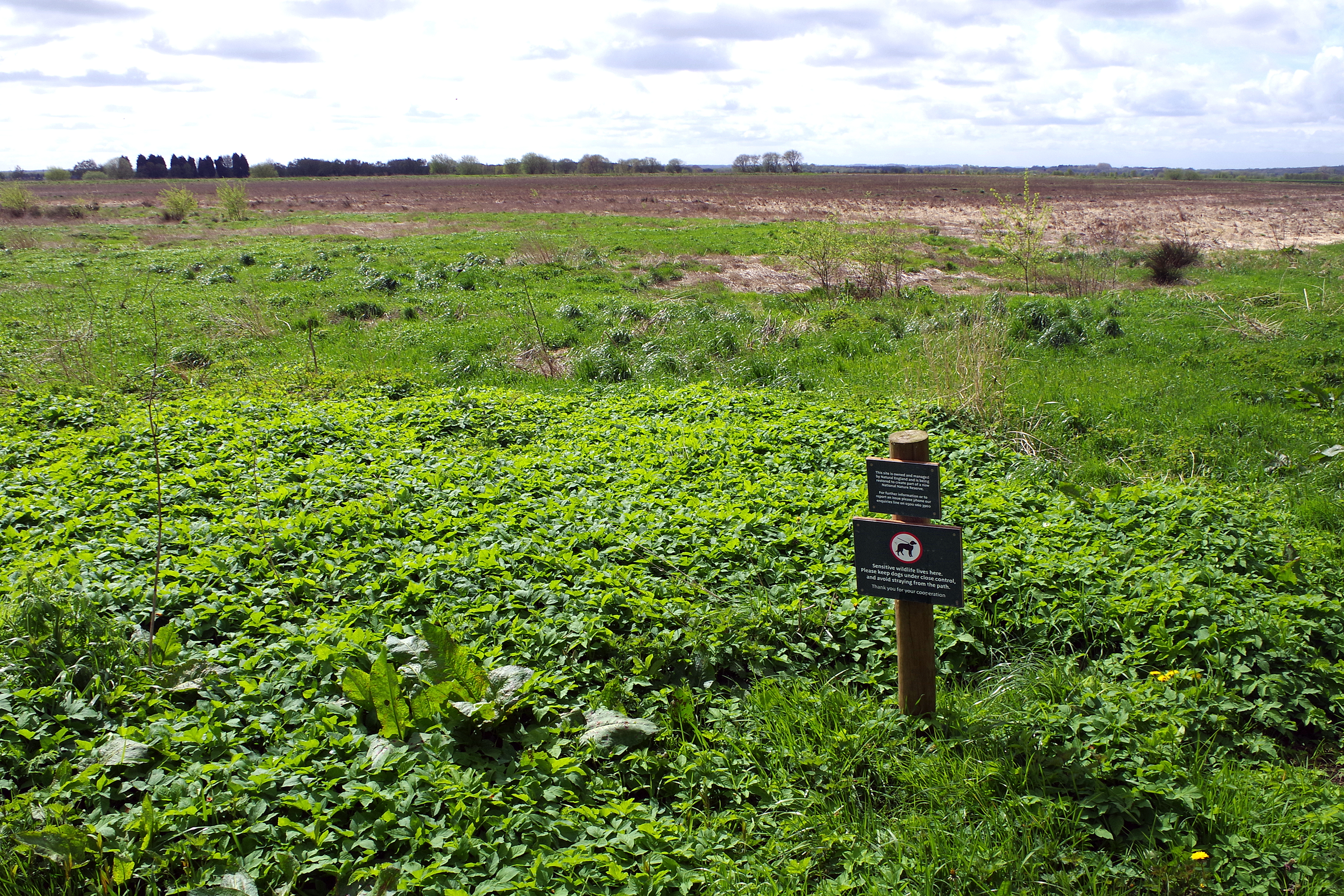
- Little Woolden Moss in 2024

- Location within Greater Manchester
- Interactive map of Cadishead and Little Woolden Moss
- Type: Peatland
- OS grid: SJ 69 95
- Coordinates: 53°27′43″N 2°27′08″W
- Area: 115 hectares (280 acres)
- Operator: Wildlife Trust for Lancashire, Manchester and North Merseyside
- Website: www.lancswt.org.uk/nature-reserves/cadishead-little-woolden-moss

Cadishead and Little Woolden Moss is a nature reserve of the Wildlife Trust for Lancashire, Manchester and North Merseyside, an area of Chat Moss which is being restored to its former state of peatland.

== Description ==
Cadishead Moss and Little Woolden Moss are parts of Chat Moss, an area west of Salford of about 2,750 hectares (6,800 acres). Chat Moss was formerly an area of lowland raised bog dating back about 10,000 years; it was converted into agricultural land in the 19th century, by creating a network of drainage channels, and peat was extracted.

The Chat Moss Project, a project of the Wildlife Trust for Lancashire, Manchester and North Merseyside, is working, with the help of local volunteers, to restore areas of Chat Moss. Peatlands are important, because they store carbon dioxide, which has been absorbed over thousands of years, whereas degraded peatland emits carbon dioxide; and peatlands reduce flooding by soaking up water. Restoration is also important for species of wildlife which are adapted to this particular environment, and which would otherwise disappear.

Peat extraction ceased on Little Woolden Moss in 2012; sphagnum moss and cottongrass is recolonising the area. Cadishead Moss is in a later stage of restoration. Drains, originally placed to reduce moisture, are blocked, and structures are created to retain the dampness.

Wildlife to be seen includes common lizards, buzzards, short-eared owls, hobbies and dragonflies.

== Access ==
Because the reserve is boggy, and to protect wildlife, access is permitted only along a path which runs around the periphery of Little Woolden Moss, and along a path created through Cadishead Moss which links to Astley Road.

== Inclusion in national nature reserve ==
The reserve in one of the sites included in Risley, Holcroft and Chat Moss National Nature Reserve, a national nature reserve created in 2025, consisting of eleven sites of varied lowland peat areas in Greater Manchester and Cheshire.

== See also ==
- Peatland restoration
- Wetland conservation
