= Brockholes (nature reserve) =

Nature reserve near Preston, England

Coordinates: 53.773°N 2.631°W

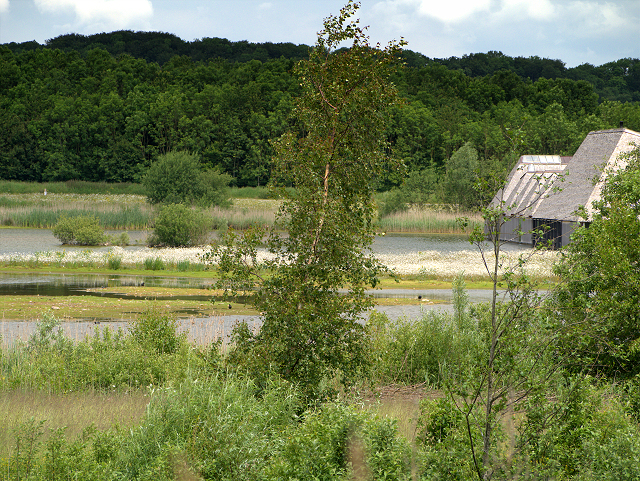
Brockholes Nature Reserve

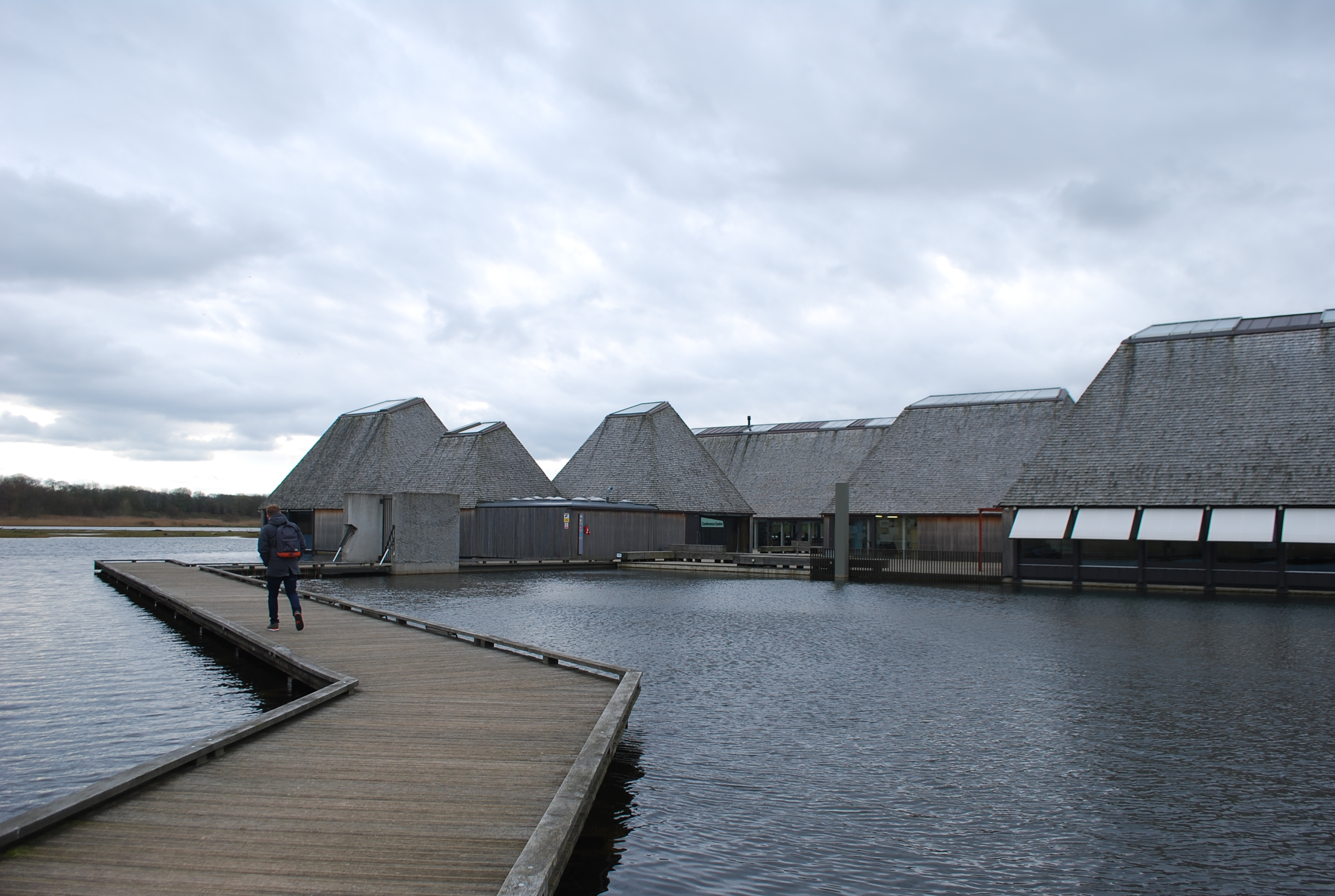
Brockholes Visitor Centre

Brockholes is a nature reserve near Preston, Lancashire, England, just off Junction 31 of the M6 motorway. It is owned by the Wildlife Trust for Lancashire, Manchester and North Merseyside. Situated in the flood-plain of the river Ribble, it has the UK's first floating visitor village.

Brockholes was previously a major quarry extraction site. The land was bought by the Trust in January 2007, and the reserve opened to the public at Easter 2011. It has been regenerated as a mosaic of key habitats such as pools, reedbeds and woodland. The reserve is aimed less at dedicated bird-watchers and nature lovers than the general public of the big cities. The riverbank is covered in steaming ferns and rampant Himalayan balsam.

Brockholes offers a wide range of events throughout the year and over 250 acres of trails and hides. It has already seen record numbers of breeding wading birds along with visitors such as osprey, otter and bittern.

== Visitor Village ==
In July 2007 an architectural design competition managed by RIBA Competitions invited architects and architect-led multidisciplinary design teams to design the new visitor facilities for the Brockholes Wetland and Woodland Nature Reserve. A design by Adam Khan Architects, working with Price & Myers, was selected by the wildlife trust and its partners. Work commenced in 2009.

Brockholes Visitor Village is the second floating visitor centre in the UK, after Norfolk Wildlife Trust's Broads Wildlife Centre which was opened by The Queen in 1976. It houses shops, an exhibition area, an activity room for schools and community groups, a restaurant and a conference centre. It has won national recognition, receiving:

- the special award for sustainability in the 2012 Civic Trust Awards.
- the "Commercial & Public Access" category in the 2011 Wood Awards.
