= Risley Moss =

Area of peat bog in Warrington, England

Coordinates: 53°25′20″N 2°30′12″W

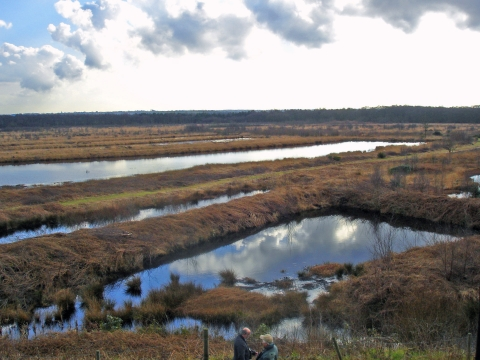
Risley Moss

Risley Moss is an area of peat bog situated near Birchwood in Warrington, England. It is a country park, Site of Special Scientific Interest and a Local Nature Reserve. It covers an area of 210.5 acres (85.2 ha) and is one of the last remaining fragments of the raised bogs that once covered large areas of South Lancashire and North Cheshire.

== History ==
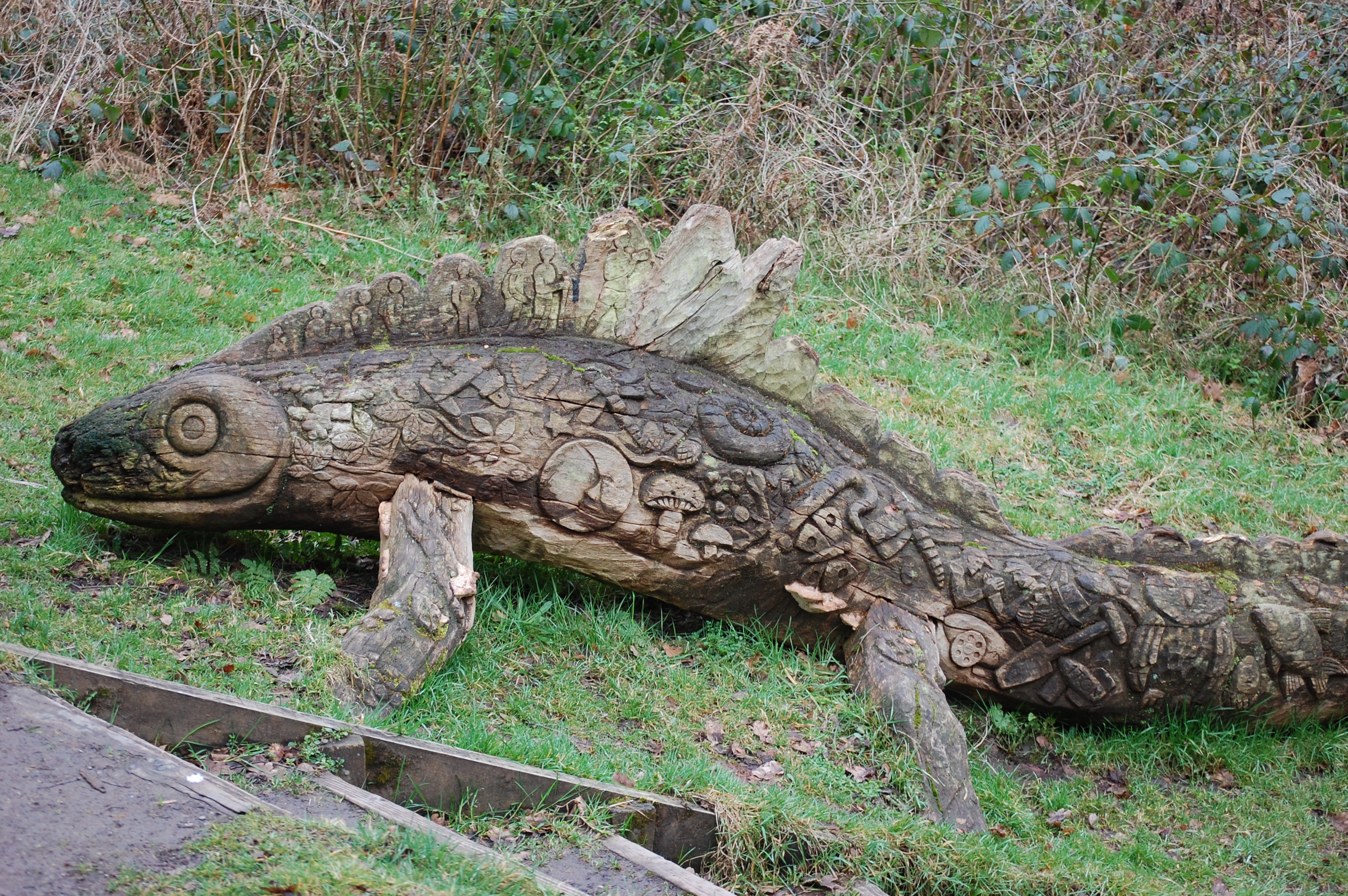
Carved sculpture of a Great Crested Newt

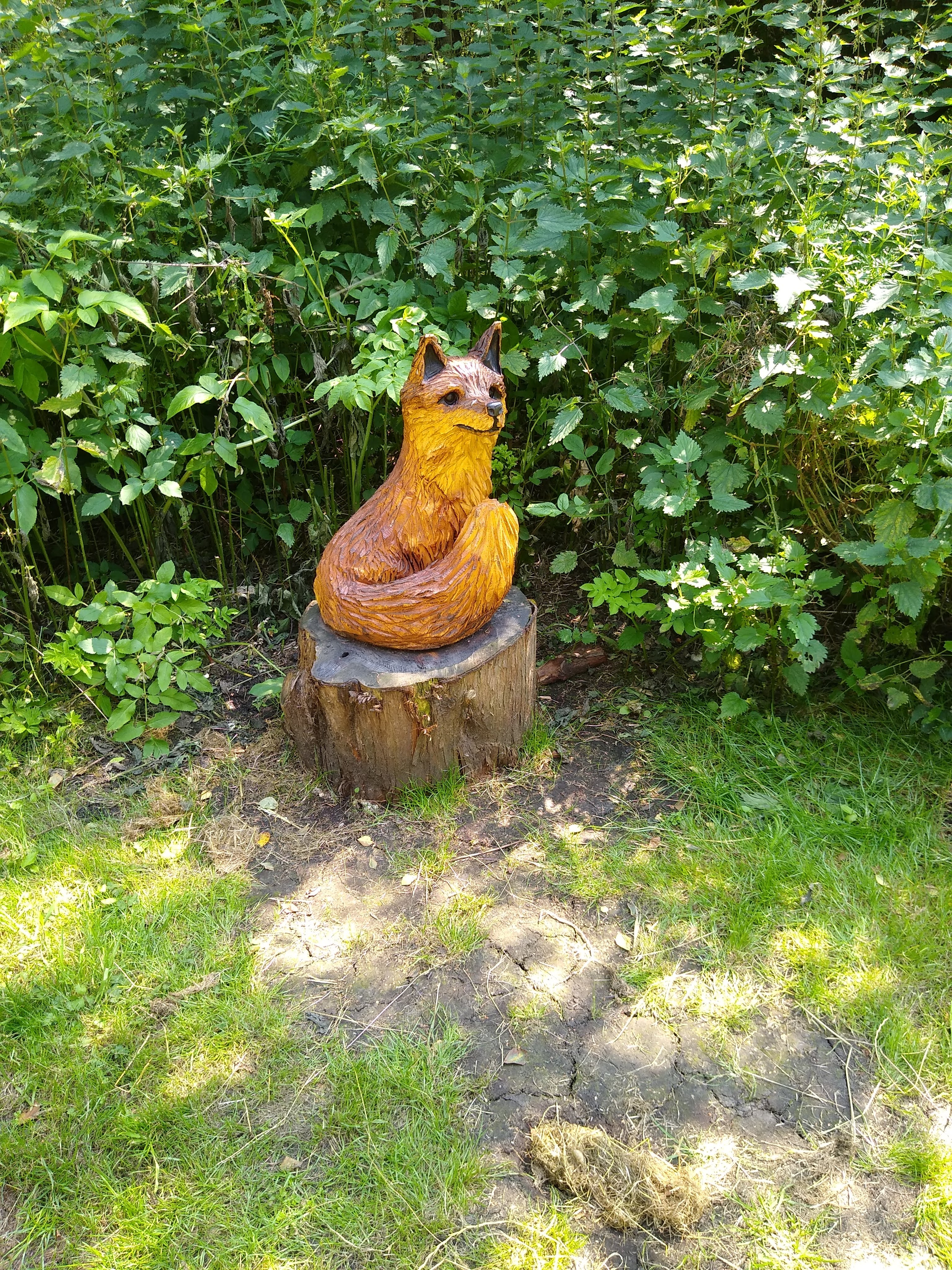
A fox sculpture on one of the walks

Natural depressions in the glacial drift left by the ice sheets which covered the Cheshire–Shropshire plain during the last ice age, 10,000–15,000 years ago, filled with water, forming the meres and mosses characteristic of the area today. In some cases, like Risley Moss, peat accumulation filled the depression, allowing colonisation by bog mosses such as the Sphagnum varieties, thus giving rise to the name "moss".

Risley Moss is one of only two mosses in Cheshire where the water level has been deliberately raised in an attempt to encourage the regeneration of an active bog surface. The long-term restoration project to re-wet the moss began in 1978 and was completed in 2002. This scheme was undertaken to create a series of scrapes and bunds to retain water and recreate the perfect conditions for bog flora such as cotton grass and sphagnum mosses to re-colonise the bogs.

Risley Moss was first mentioned in the Doomsday Book when it was part of the Culcheth Estate. The Moss passed to his daughter Ellen de Risley and remained in her family until 1736 when it was bought by a local landowner. During the Industrial Revolution many of the peat bogs near Manchester were drained however Risley was too wet and remained under water.

It was the former site of a large Royal Ordnance Factory. Today, it is managed by Cheshire County Council as a country park and an educational nature reserve. It was designated a Site of Special Scientific Interest in 1986. Risley Moss, together with Astley and Bedford Mosses and Holcroft Moss, is also a European Union designated Special Area of Conservation, known as Manchester Mosses.

== Features ==
The main feature of Risley Moss is the large peat bog, overlooked by two observation points: a raised platform (previously having a large watchtower) ideal for bird watching, and a smaller lookout (currently obstructed by plant growth). These points have additional information inside relating to bird species and landscape layouts. The Moss also has several smaller huts located inside the forested area for bird watching and nature enthusiasts. Tours across the bog and nature reserve are available from the main information centre and are undertaken by local rangers.

In addition to the natural features and landscape, there are several sculptures around the site, usually with a natural theme.

== Facilities ==
There is a visitor centre, countryside walks, bird hides and picnic benches.

== Inclusion in national nature reserve ==
The reserve in one of the sites included in the Risley, Holcroft and Chat Moss National Nature Reserve, a national nature reserve created in 2025, consisting of eleven sites of varied lowland peat areas in Greater Manchester and Cheshire.
