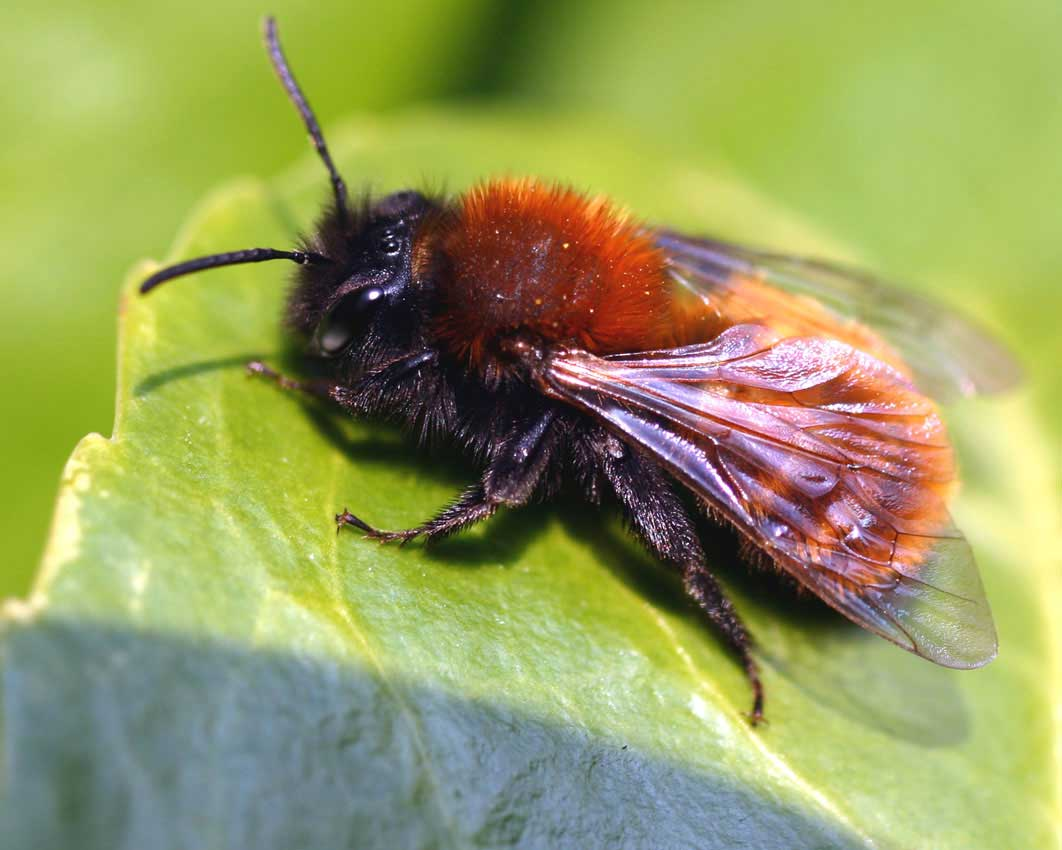

Conservation status
- Least Concern (IUCN 3.1)

Scientific classification
- Kingdom: Animalia
- Phylum: Arthropoda
- Clade: Pancrustacea
- Class: Insecta
- Order: Hymenoptera
- Family: Andrenidae
- Genus: Andrena
- Species: A. fulva

Binomial name
- Andrena fulva Müller, 1766

= Tawny mining bee =

Species of bee

The tawny mining bee, Andrena fulva, is a European species of the sand bee (Andrena) genus. The males are 10–12 mm (0.4–0.5 in) and the females 8–10 mm (0.3–0.4 in) long. The female is covered with fox-red hair on the dorsal surface of its thorax and abdomen and black hair on its head and ventral surface. The male is less distinctive, being clad in golden-brown or reddish-brown hairs, with some long white hairs on the face, and a tooth on each of the mandibles.

The tawny mining bee lives in Europe, ranging from the Balkans to southern Scandinavia, the United Kingdom and Ireland. It lives among short vegetation in light woodlands and dry grasslands, and also in parks and gardens. It is widely distributed but has a low population density. It is present in lowland England and Wales and at a few sites in southern Scotland. In Ireland it was only known at two locations in County Kilkenny in 1927, and until 2012 was considered extinct, when it was rediscovered at several locations throughout Ireland.

The tawny mining bee flies from March until May. It prefers to fly to a range of different nectar-producing and pollen-bearing plants; these include beech (Fagus sylvatica), blackthorn (Prunus spinosa), buttercup (Ranunculus sp.), daffodils, garlic mustard (Alliaria petiolata), gooseberry (Ribes uva-crispa), hawthorn (Crataegus monogyna), holly (Ilex aquifolium), maple (Acer sp.), oak (Quercus sp.), plum (Prunus domestica), sallow (Salix sp.), sycamore (Acer pseudoplatanus) and wayfaring-tree (Viburnum lantana).

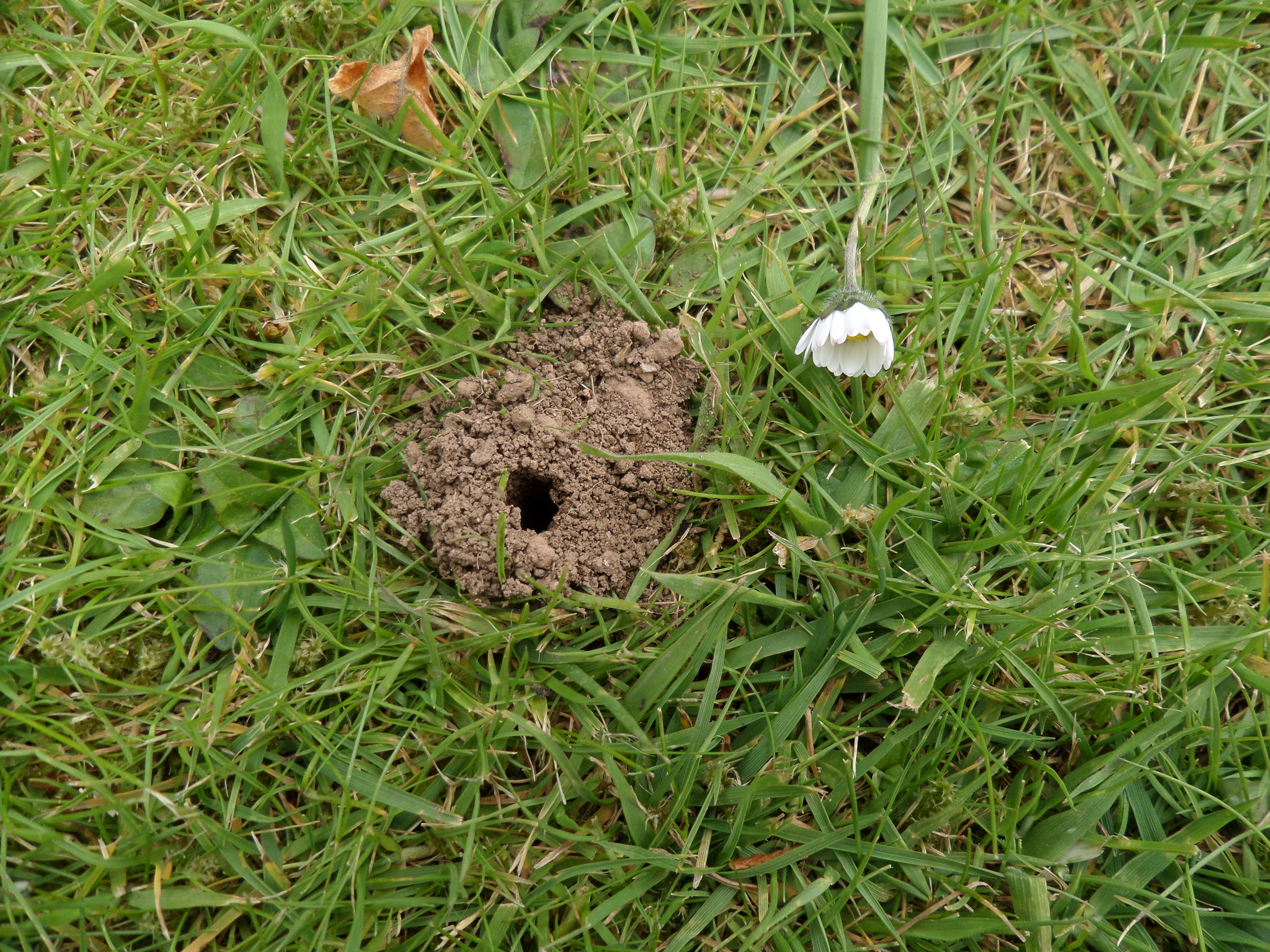
Nest entrance and tumulus

It mates in spring, after which the male dies and the female starts to build a nest. Sometimes more than a hundred females build nests in a few square metres but the tawny mining bee does not create a colony, each female having her own nest. The tawny mining bee is therefore classified amongst solitary bees. The nest is a vertical shaft 200–300 mm (8–12 in) deep, with several brood cells branching off it. The female fills these cells with a mixture of nectar and pollen, on which she lays one egg in each cell. The larva hatches within a few days, grows quickly and pupates within a few weeks. The adults emerge in spring after hibernation.

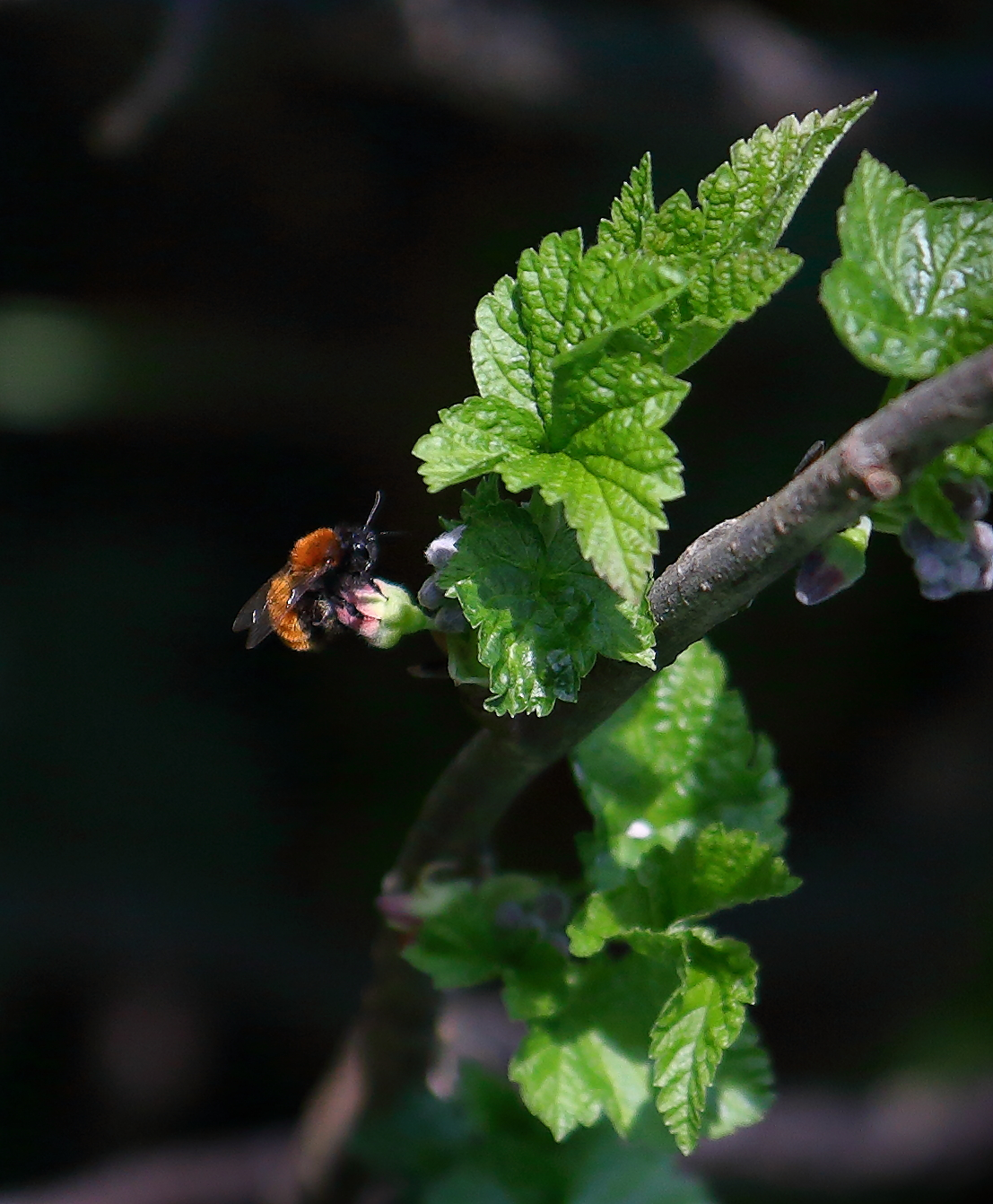
Female tawny mining bee collecting pollen from a blackcurrant flower
