= Chat Moss =

Peat bog in Greater Manchester, England

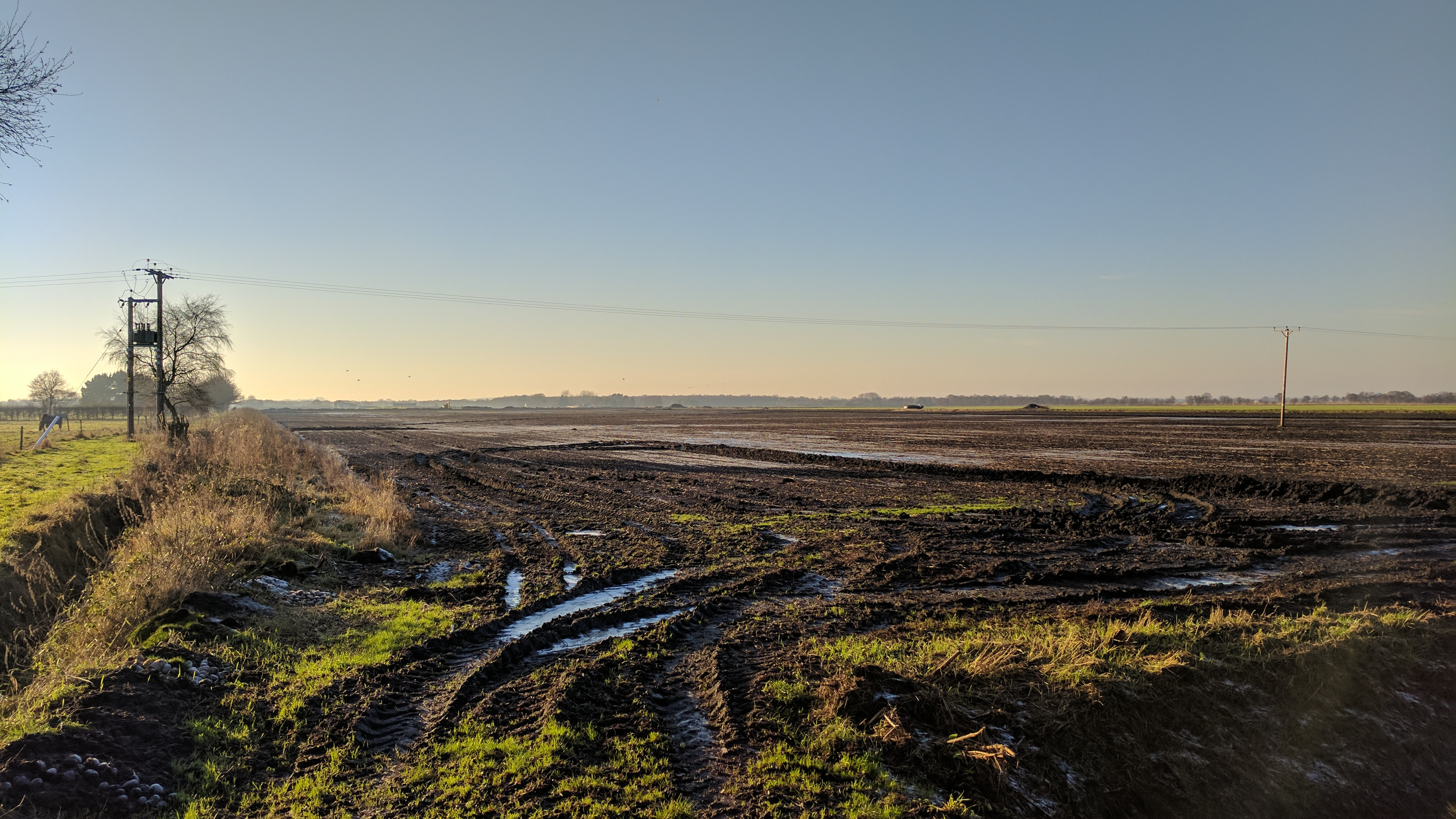
- Along Astley Road

- Location within Greater Manchester
- Area: 10.6 sq mi (27 km^{2})
- OS grid reference: SJ713963
- Metropolitan borough: Salford, Warrington, Wigan, Trafford, St Helens
- Metropolitan county: Greater Manchester; Cheshire
- Region: North West
- Country: England
- Sovereign state: United Kingdom
- Post town: MANCHESTER
- Postcode district: M17, M29, M44
- Post town: LEIGH
- Postcode district: WN7
- Post town: WARRINGTON
- Postcode district: WA3
- Dialling code: 0161
- Police: Greater Manchester
- Fire: Greater Manchester
- Ambulance: North West
- UK Parliament: Worsley and Eccles South, Leigh, Warrington North, Stretford and Urmston

Chat Moss is a large area of peat bog that makes up part of the City of Salford, Metropolitan Borough of Wigan and Trafford in Greater Manchester, England. It also makes up part of Metropolitan Borough of St Helens in Merseyside and Warrington in Cheshire. North of the Manchester Ship Canal and River Mersey, 5 miles (8 km) to the west of Manchester, it occupies an area of about 10.6 square miles (27.5 km^{2}).

As it might be recognised today, Chat Moss is thought to be about 7,000 years old, but peat development seems to have begun there with the ending of the last ice age, about 10,000 years ago. The depth of peat ranges from 24 to 30 feet (7 to 9 m). A great deal of reclamation work has been carried out, particularly during the 19th century, but a large-scale network of drainage channels is still required to keep the land from reverting to bog. In 1958 workers extracting peat discovered the severed head of what is believed to be a Romano-British Celt, possibly a sacrificial victim, in the eastern part of the bog near Worsley.

Much of Chat Moss is now prime agricultural land, although farming in the area is in decline. A 228-acre (92 ha) area of Chat Moss, notified as Astley and Bedford Mosses, was designated a Site of Special Scientific Interest in 1989. Along with nearby Risley Moss and Holcroft Moss, Astley and Bedford Mosses has also been designated as a European Union Special Area of Conservation, known as Manchester Mosses.

Chat Moss threatened the completion of the Liverpool and Manchester Railway, until George Stephenson, with advice from East Anglian marshland specialist Robert Stannard, succeeded in constructing a railway line through it in 1829; his solution was to "float" the line on a bed of bound heather and branches topped with tar and covered with rubble stone. The M62 motorway, completed in 1976, crosses the bog, to the north of Irlam. Also the A580 crosses the bog, forming Leigh, Lowton and Astley's (Wigan MBC)'s boundary with Warrington, Culcheth and Glazebury, Croft, and Kenyon.

== History ==
Chat Moss may be named after St Chad, a 7th-century bishop of Mercia, but as it was once part of a great tree-edged lake, as evidenced by the numerous wood remains in the lower levels of the peat, it is perhaps more likely that the name stems from the Celtic word ced, meaning wood. Chat Moss could also derive from Ceatta, an Old English personal name and mos, a swamp or alternatively the first element could be the Old English ceat meaning a piece of wet ground. It was recorded as Catemosse in 1277 and Chatmos in 1322. Moss is the local name for a peat bog.

Daniel Defoe visited the area in 1724, on his way from Warrington to Manchester:

From hence (Warrington), on the road to Manchester, we pass'd the great bog or waste call'd Chatmos, the first of that kind that we see in England ... The surface, at a distance, looks black and dirty, and is indeed frightful to think of, for it will bear neither horse or man, unless in an exceeding dry season, and then not so as to be passable, or that any one should travel over them ... What nature meant by such a useless production, 'tis hard to imagine; but the land is entirely waste, excep ... for the poor cottagers fuel, and the quantity used for that is very small.

— Daniel Defoe, A tour thro' the whole island of Great Britain, divided into circuits or journies

Peat bogs sometimes burst their boundaries, particularly after being subjected to heavy rainfall, and this seems to have happened with Chat Moss in the 16th century. John Leland, writing during the reign of King Henry VIII, described one such event:

Chat Moss brast up within a mile of Mosley Haul, and destroied much grounde with mosse thereabout, and destroyed much fresh-water fishche thereabout, first corrupting with stinkinge water Glasebrooke, and so Glasebrooke carried stinkinge water and mosse into Mersey water, and Mersey corrupted carried the roulling mosse, part to the shores of Wales, part to the isle of Man, and some unto Ireland.

— John Leland, Quoted in Robert Chambers'The Book of Days; A Miscellany of Popular Antiquity

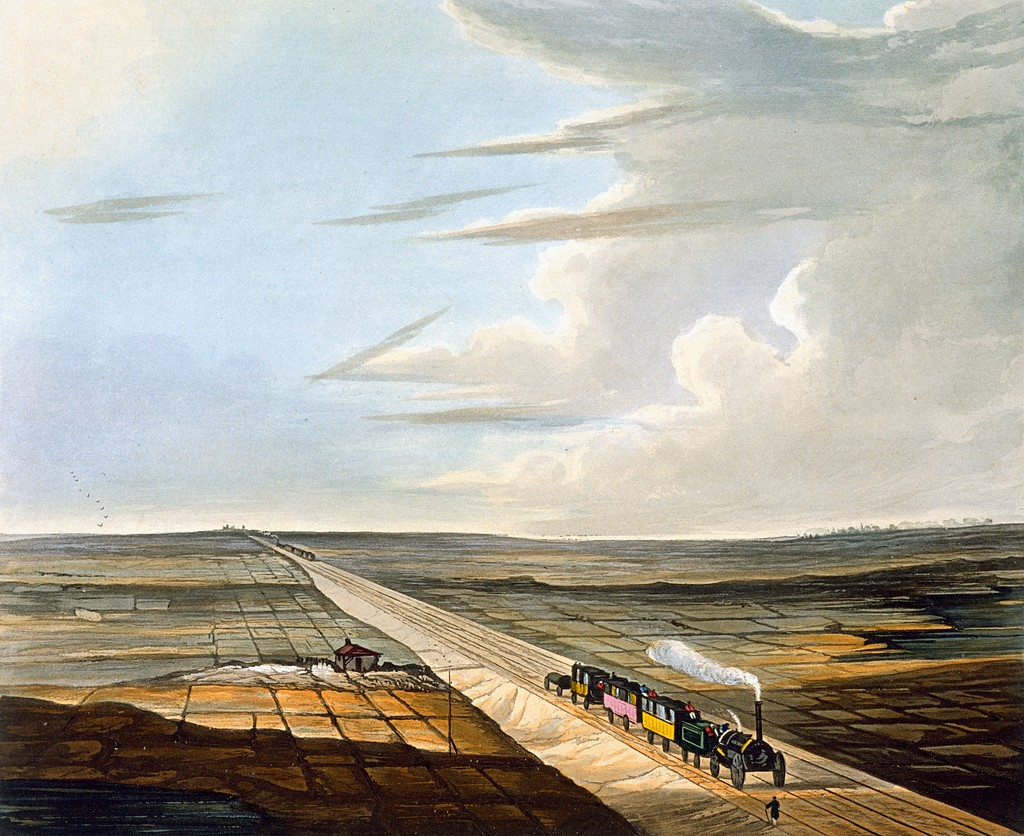
View of the railway across Chat Moss, 1833

Chat Moss presented a significant challenge to the engineers constructing the Liverpool and Manchester Railway in 1826 because of the difficulty in providing a solid base for the track, in particular at a location known as Blackpool Hole. George Stephenson was the engineer in charge of the project, and his initial idea was to dump enough spoil in the bog so that it would reach the bottom. This approach turned out to be impractical however, as the liquidity of the bog allowed the spoil to flow away from where the track was to be laid. The eventual solution, to build the line on a "floating" wood and stone foundation, was hailed as a "great triumph of engineering". The first train ran through Chat Moss in 1830, and the line is still in use today.

=== Reclamation ===
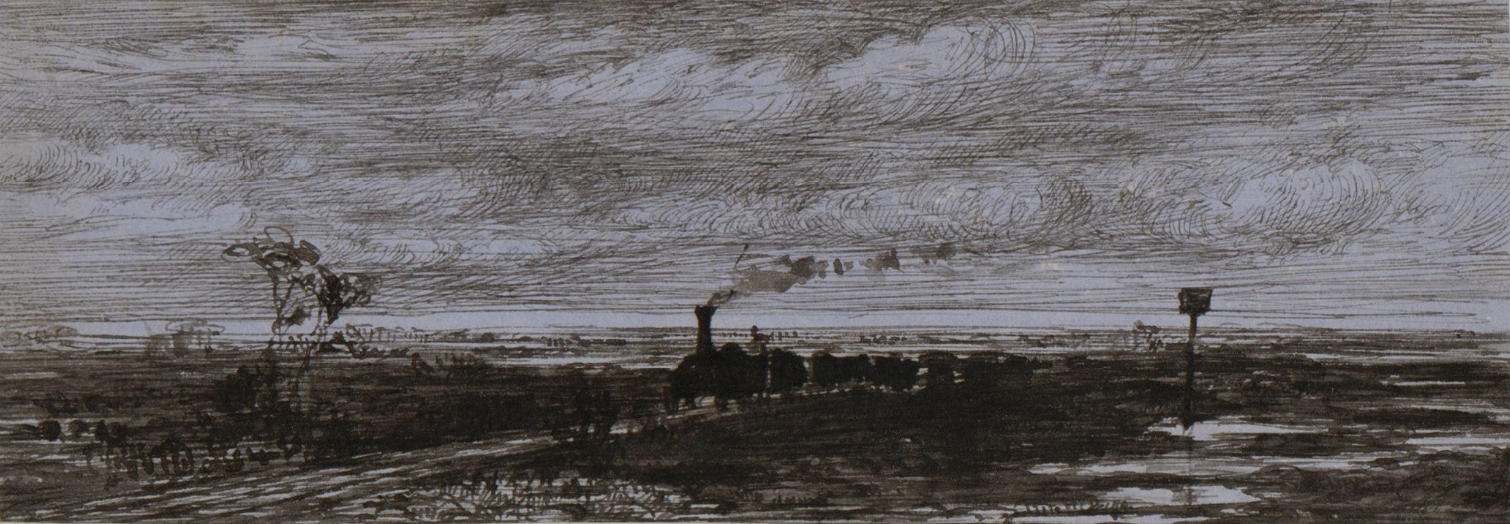
A traveller's sketch of the train at Chat Moss, November 1857

The first attempt at reclaiming Chat Moss took place at the start of the 19th century. In 1793 William Roscoe began work on reclaiming the smaller Trafford Moss, now part of Trafford Park. By 1798 that work was sufficiently advanced for Roscoe to enter into a lease of part of Chat Moss from the de Trafford family, but no reclamation work was carried out until 1805.

Reclamation methods varied somewhat during the 19th century, but three basic operations featured; constructing drains at appropriate intervals; building a system of roads to allow access to the land so that materials such as clay, lime or marl could be dumped on it, to give it body; and fertilising the land by adding manure, often in the form of the euphemistically named night soil, collected from neighbouring towns.

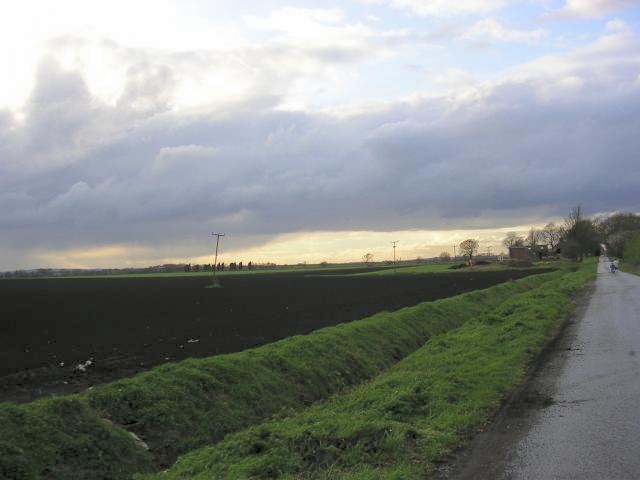
Part of Chat Moss known as Irlam Moss, showing the typical landscape of drainage ditches instead of hedges

The reclamation of Chat Moss and Trafford Moss was innovative in that instead of constructing roads to give access for the material to be dumped onto the bog, a movable light railway was developed. Narrow gauge track – which allowed the weight of the wagons to be spread evenly across an area of the bog – was temporarily laid down and then picked up and relaid elsewhere as needed. Roscoe was declared bankrupt in 1821, but the reclamation work continued under the stewardship of others who took over his leasehold interest, amongst them William Baines, the anti-Corn Law MP and owner of the Leeds Mercury newspaper.

Between 1831 and 1851, the population of nearby Manchester increased by more than 150 per cent, putting considerable pressure on refuse disposal. The problem was exacerbated by a gradual switch from the 1870s onwards from the older cesspit methods of sewage disposal to pail closets, which required regular emptying. By the 1880s, Manchester was producing more than 200,000 tons (203,209 t) of refuse annually, about 75 per cent of that being night soil. In 1895, Manchester Corporation purchased 2,502 acres (1,013 ha) of Chat Moss known as Chat Moss Estate from Sir Humphrey de Trafford, with a view to using the moss as a refuse disposal site. The final price paid by the corporation was £137,531 7s 1d (equivalent to £18.7 million in 2023 (Note: United Kingdom Gross Domestic Product deflator figures follow the MeasuringWorth "consistent series" supplied in Thomas, Ryland; Williamson, Samuel H. (2024), "What Was the U.K. GDP Then?", MeasuringWorth))

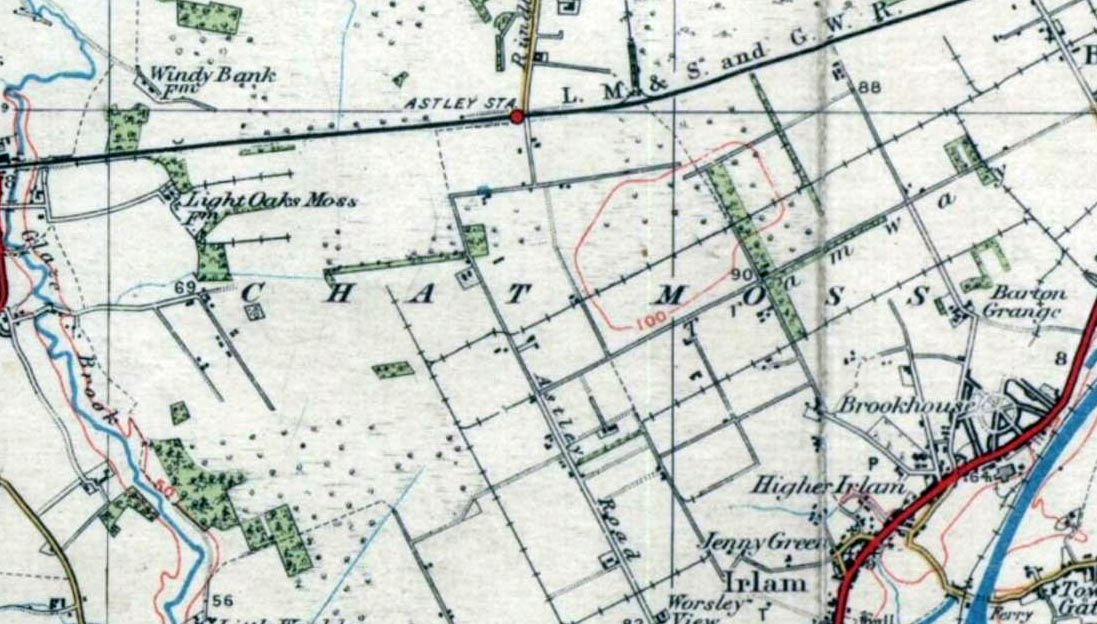
A 1937 map of Chat Moss

Refuse was carried on barges down the Manchester Ship Canal as far as Boysnope Wharf, where it was loaded onto a light railway system to be taken into the moss for dumping. Farmers on Chat Moss were legally required by their tenancy agreements to accept a specified amount of refuse on their land, and were even obliged to pay for it. Farmers could themselves undertake reclamation work, with the land reclaimed being incorporated into their tenancies. An agreement dated 1905, between Manchester Corporation and Plant Cottage Farm, shows that the corporation agreed to supply 300 tons (305 t) of refuse per acre free of charge for the first year, with the tenant being obliged to accept 12 tons (12 t) of refuse per acre each year thereafter. The dumping of night soil on Chat Moss ended in 1923, but general refuse continued to be dumped on a diminishing scale until it finally ended in 1966.

Once drained, stabilised and fertilised, Chat Moss became prime agricultural land, supplying Manchester with salad and other vegetables. The drainage channels, still required today, give the area its distinctive flat landscape broken up by ditches instead of hedges or walls. Even after all of the reclamation work that has taken place, parts of the area remain remote and bleak.

A scheme was devised during the Second World War to protect major cities from enemy bombing by lighting decoy fires on nearby open land. Manchester was protected by four of these Starfish sites as they were known, two of them on Chat Moss. RAF Balloon Command was responsible for the administration and manning of the sites, which were fully operational by 23 January 1941. Each consisted of an air raid shelter for the crew along with various devices to simulate street lighting and the explosions of incendiary bombs. The effectiveness of the decoy sites is uncertain, and they were closed in 1943.

=== Worsley Man ===
In August 1958, workmen digging peat in an area of Chat Moss near Worsley discovered a severed head and called the police. It was initially believed that the head had been in the bog for less than a year, and so a search was conducted for more remains, but nothing was found. After X-rays and chemical tests, it was determined that the head had been in the bog for at least 100 years. An inquest was held into the man's death, at which the coroner returned an open verdict, and the head was put in the care of the Manchester Medical School.

The discovery of the nearby Lindow Man in 1984 generated renewed interest in bog bodies, and in 1987 what had become known as Worsley Man was re-examined. The inspection revealed a wound behind the right ear, fractures to the top of the skull, and a cut through the vertebra where he had been decapitated. The remains of a garotte were also found around his neck, all of which were suggestive of a ritual killing rather than an accidental death, perhaps related to the Celtic cult of the severed head. The condition of the tooth pulp suggested that Worsley Man was 26–45 years old at the time of his death, which radiocarbon dating of a fragment of preserved soft tissue indicated was during the late Iron Age, sometime around 121 to 251 AD, identifying him as a Romano-British Celt. Worsley Man is now in the care of the Manchester Museum.

== Geography and ecology ==
At 53°27′46″N 2°25′54″W (53.4629, -2.4316), Chat Moss lies at the southern edge of the Lancashire Plain, an area of Bunter sandstones overlaid with marls laid down during the Late Triassic period. Those rocks are themselves overlaid by a layer of boulder clay deposited during the last ice age, about 10,000 years ago. The combination of the flat topography and the underlying clay resulted in extensive peat bogs developing along the Mersey Valley, and overflowing beyond the valley. The bogs in the area between the River Glaze in the west, and Worsley and Eccles in the east, to the north of what was the River Irwell – now the Manchester Ship Canal – are known collectively as Chat Moss.

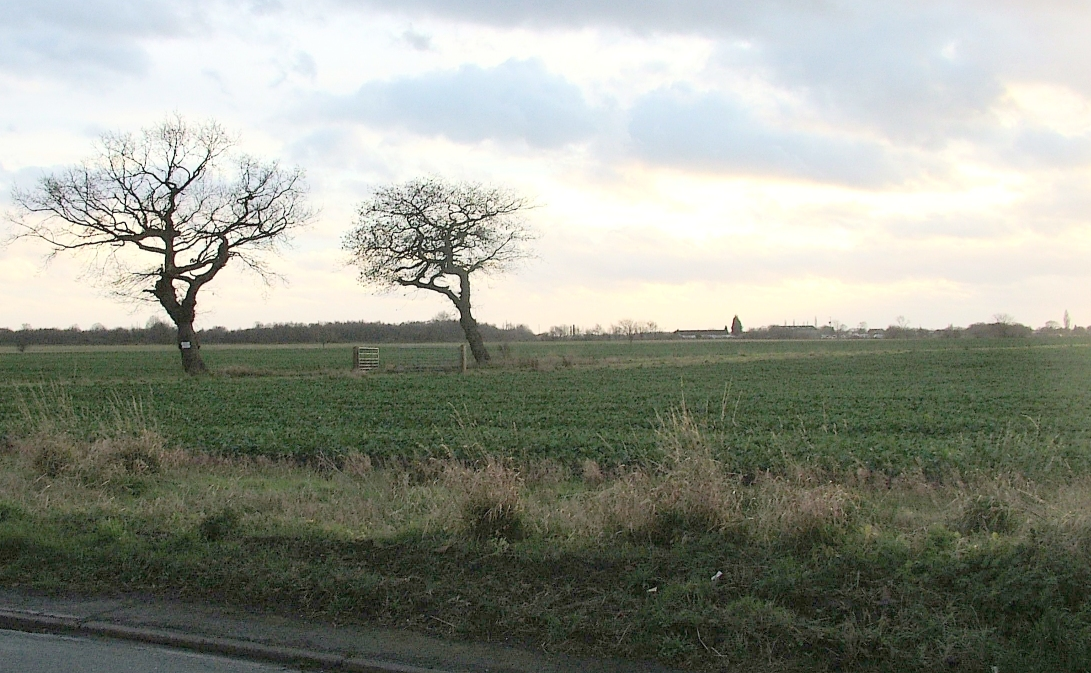
View across Chat Moss towards the village of Glazebrook

Chat Moss is a lowland raised bog. In areas where drainage is poor, water-logging can slow down plant decomposition, producing peat, which over the years can raise the level of the bog above that of the surrounding land. The moss occupies an area of about 10.6 square miles (27.5 km^{2}), and is about 5 miles (8 km) long, about 2.5 miles (4.0 km) across at its widest point, lying 75 feet (23 m) above sea level. Chat Moss lies mainly in Salford, but extends into Wigan. By the 1990s, an estimated 72 per cent of the bog had been reclaimed, most of it for agriculture. About 230 acres (93 ha) of degraded bog remain, with 766 acres (310 ha) of undamaged peat deposits in four former peat extraction sites. The peat varies in depth between 24 feet (7 m) and 30 feet (9 m).

The main bog mosses found in the peat of Chat Moss are Sphagnum cuspidatum, S. imbricatum, and S. acutifolia. The peat up to about 7 feet (2 m) from the surface is mainly humidified S. acutifolia, with fresher S. imbricatum peat nearer the surface.

A 228-acre (92 ha) area of Chat Moss, to the north of the Liverpool–Manchester railway line, notified as Astley & Bedford Mosses, was designated a Site of Special Scientific Interest in 1989. Astley & Bedford Mosses, along with Risley Moss and Holcroft Moss, is also a European Union designated Special Area of Conservation, known as Manchester Mosses.

The major habitats in the moss are bog, heathland, woodland and acidic grassland, subject to varying degrees of wetness depending on the local drainage. The remaining areas of bog are dominated by common cottongrass Eriophorum angustifolium and hare's-tail cottongrass E. vaginatum. Bog mosses are more scarce, but Sphagnum cuspidatum, S. recurvum, S. tenellum, S. fimbriatum and S. subnitens occur in patches. As the peat has become drier, areas have been taken over by purple moor grass Molinia caerulea and by downy birch Betula pubescens. The moss also supports several bird species, and is particularly important for wintering raptors such as the hen harrier Circus cyaneus cyaneus, the short-eared owl Asio flammeus and the merlin Falco columbarius, along with breeding species such as the curlew Numenius arquata and the long-eared owl Asio otus. There is a large heronry in Botany Bay Wood, the largest area of woodland in Greater Manchester.

The domestic and industrial waste dumped on Chat Moss resulted in very high levels of heavy metals such as lead and copper in the soil, raising concerns that crops grown there may pose a health risk. The high pH of the peaty soil limits the mobility of the metals however, and prevents them being taken up by crops.

== Economy ==
Chat Moss makes up the largest area of prime farmland in Greater Manchester, but farming on the moss is in decline. In 2003, it was reported that of the 54 farms on the moss, occupying 3,000 acres (1,214 ha), almost half the area of the bog, only three were growing vegetables. Others had turned to arable farming, turf growing or horse livery instead of salad and vegetable crops. Chat Moss also contains the largest block of semi-natural woodland in Greater Manchester.

Most of the area is now Green Belt, placing restrictions on the kinds of developments that can take place. There are areas of commercial peat extraction, but Salford City Council is seeking to return at least some back to wet mossland. Planning permission for peat extraction expired at the end of 2010. At a meeting held on 30 June 2011 Salford Council decided not to renew the permission, and on 1 August obtained a court order prohibiting any further extraction pending an appeal by the companies involved. A public inquiry concluded in 2012 supported the council's decision, and commercial peat extraction on Chat Moss ceased.

== Cultural references ==
In 1994 the British composer Peter Maxwell Davies, who was born in Salford, wrote a seven-minute tone poem for school orchestra, titled Chat Moss. Chat Moss was also the subject of a ceiling painting produced as the result of a research project jointly funded by the Arts and Humanities Research Board and Arts Council England. The project was a collaboration between artist Derek Hampson and geographer Gary Priestnall. Hampson chose Chat Moss as their subject because of its 19th-century historical significance as the site of the world's first passenger railway and its "anti-picturesque appearance", a "nondescript landscape of stumpy trees and expanses of grass". The 40-square-metre (430 sq ft) artwork, painted on more than 100 ceiling tiles, was exhibited in November 2004 at the REDUX Gallery in London.

== See also ==
- Cadishead and Little Woolden Moss
- List of Sites of Special Scientific Interest in Greater Manchester
