= Fylde Sand Dunes Project =

Coordinates: 53.7602°N 3.0515°W

The Fylde, and its location in Lancashire

The Fylde Sand Dunes Project is a partnership project to improve the dunes on the coast of the Fylde as a sea defence, conserve the coastal environment, and improve public awareness of the dunes.

The project is a partnership between the Lancashire Wildlife Trust, Fylde Council and Blackpool Council, and is funded by the Environment Agency until 2027.

== Description ==
The dunes cover about 80 hectares (200 acres), from Starr Gate, in south-west Blackpool, in the north to Lytham St Annes in the south. Because of the expansion of coastal towns, this is less than 20% of the area of dunes on the Fylde 150 years ago. The dunes are important, being a natural barrier to the sea at high tide. During storms, sand is released, which reduces wave action.

There is a wide variety of plants: over 280 species of vascular plants have been recorded on the Fylde sand dunes. 150 species of butterflies and moths have been recorded. Breeding birds on the sand dunes include reed buntings, stonechats and skylarks.

== Management ==
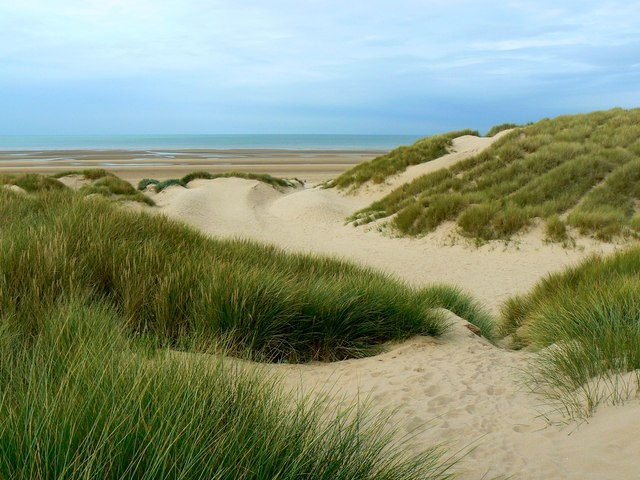
Sand dunes near St Annes

With the help of volunteers, the dunes are managed by controlling invasive species, repairing the dunes, creating dune slacks, and making recognisable pathways. So that dunes can develop, chestnut paling fencing is erected, marram grass is planted, and recycled Christmas trees are planted: the tree branches trap sand particles and help sand to accumulate. In August 2024 it was reported that the area of dunes has widened by about 100 metres (330 ft).

There has been a project, from 2017 to 2021, to reintroduce sand lizards, which have become rare in the UK, to the dunes. 412 captive-bred hatchlings were introduced; monitoring has shown that the lizards are becoming established.

== Education and guided walks ==
"Beach school", an activity similar to forest school, is offered to local schools, to familiarise children with the coastal environment in an organised setting.

Guided walks are offered; they are free and take place regularly.

== See also ==
- Sand dune ecology
- Sand dune stabilization
