= Holcroft Moss =

Nature reserve in Cheshire, England

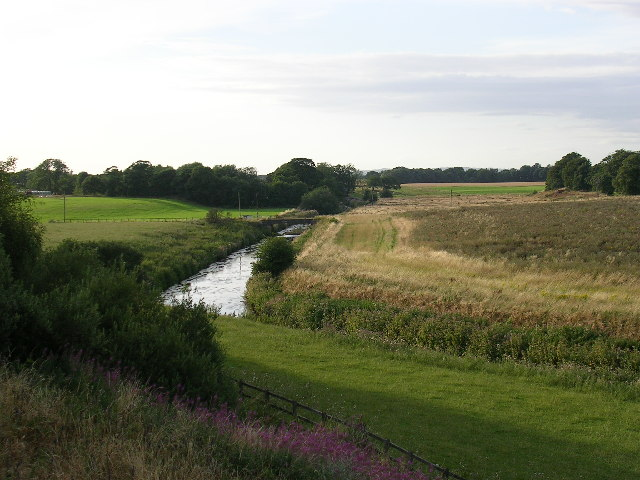
- Glaze Brook, looking north: Great Woolden Moss lies to the right of the brook and Holcroft Moss to the left

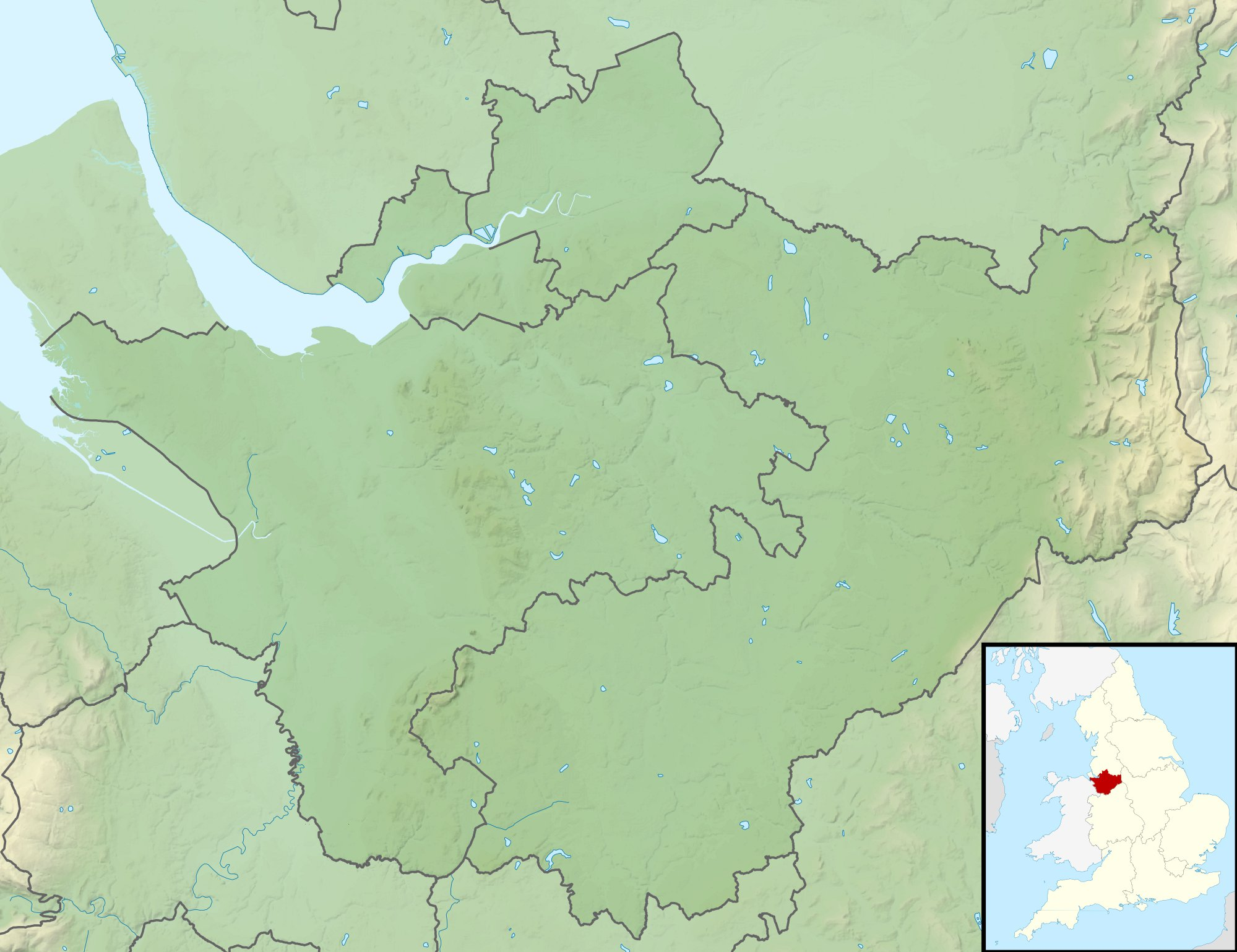
- Location within Cheshire
- OS grid: SJ 688 934
- Coordinates: 53.4369°N 2.4722°W
- Area: 18 hectares (44 acres)
- Operator: Cheshire Wildlife Trust
- Designation: Site of Special Scientific Interest; Special Area of Conservation; Ramsar site
- Website: www.cheshirewildlifetrust.org.uk/nature-reserves/holcroft-moss

Holcroft Moss is a nature reserve of the Cheshire Wildlife Trust, a lowland bog about 6 miles (10 km) north-east of Warrington.

== Description ==
It is an lowland raised bog, area about 18 hectares (44 acres), which has not been subject to peat cutting; such areas are now rare in England, and this is the only one remaining in Cheshire.

The reserve is designated a Site of Special Scientific Interest, a Special Area of Conservation, and a Ramsar site.

A peat bog may be affected by climate change: it normslly captures and stores carbon, but if it dries out, which can occur when the water table fluctuates in unpredictable weather, it releases carbon into the atmosphere. This site is surrounded by semi-natural mixed deciduous woodland, the seeds from which can cause the encroachment of scrub, and the top layer of peat would dry out; current management includes scrub and bracken control.

The reserve is not open to the public, but there are occasional volunteer work party days.

== Wildlife ==
Plant species in this habitat include round-leaf sundew, common cottongrass and cranberry. Birds to be seen include snipe and woodcock.

== Inclusion in national nature reserve ==
The reserve in one of the sites included in the Risley, Holcroft and Chat Moss National Nature Reserve, a national nature reserve created in 2025. It consists of eleven sites of varied lowland peat areas in Greater Manchester and Cheshire, an area of 529 hectares (1,310 acres). On the occasion of its launch on 14 July, Charlotte Harris, the Chief Executive of the Cheshire Wildlife Trust, said: "As a site owner at Holcroft Moss, we... are proud to be part of this pioneering partnership — one that brings together landowners, communities, and conservation organisations under a shared vision for our landscape’s future".
