= List of Sites of Special Scientific Interest in Derbyshire =

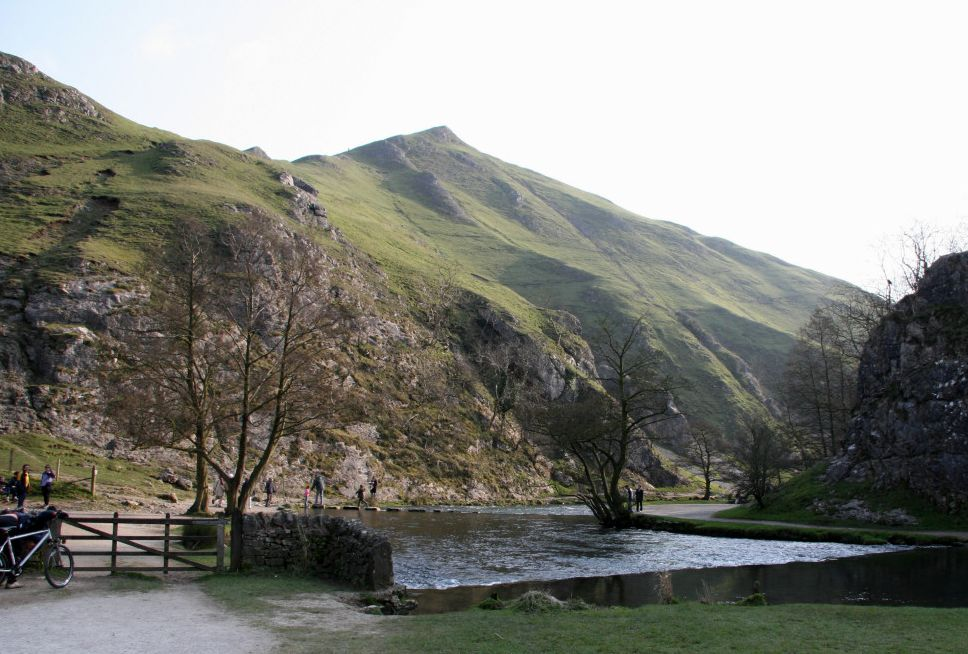
Thorpe Cloud and Dovedale, in the Dove Valley and Biggin Dale SSSI, Derbyshire

This is a list of the Sites of Special Scientific Interest (SSSIs) in Derbyshire, England, United Kingdom. In England the body responsible for designating SSSIs is Natural England, which chooses a site because of its fauna, flora, geological or physiographical features. Natural England uses the borders of Derbyshire to mark one of its Areas of Search. As of 2012, there are 99 sites designated in this Area of Search. There are 28 sites with a purely geological interest, and 54 listed for biological interest. A further 17 sites are designated for both reasons.

Natural England took over the role of designating and managing SSSIs from English Nature in October 2006 when it was formed from the amalgamation of English Nature, parts of the Countryside Agency and the Rural Development Service. Natural England, like its predecessor, uses the 1974–1996 county system and as such the same approach is followed here. The data in the table is taken from Natural England in the form of citation sheets for each SSSI, and the County Background Datasheet for Derbyshire.

For other counties, see List of SSSIs by Area of Search.

== Sites ==
Site name	Reason for designation		Area^{[A]}		Coordinates & Grid ref^{[B]}	Year in which notified	Other designations	Map^{[C]} & Citation
Site name	Biological interest	Geological interest	Hectares	Acres	Coordinates & Grid ref^{[B]}	Year in which notified	Other designations	Map^{[C]} & Citation
Abney & Bretton Cloughs	✓		147.8	365.3	53.308°N 1.689°W; SK208790	1972	NP	Map
Ambergate and Ridgeway Quarries		✓	1.0	2.5	53.058°N 1.467°W; SK358513	1963	GCR	Map
Attenborough Gravel Pits	✓		226.6	559.9	52.899°N 1.228°W; SK520338	1982	WT	Map
Bage Mine		✓	0.1	0.3	53.091°N 1.567°W; SK291549	1985	GCR	Map
Baileycroft Quarry		✓	0.9	2.1	53.085°N 1.574°W; SK286543	1985	GCR	Map
Ballidon Dale	✓		50.8	125.6	53.101°N 1.697°W; SK204560	1996	NP, SAC	Map
Bee's Nest and Green Clay Pits	✓	✓	15.0	37.0	53.087°N 1.643°W; SK240545	1990	GCR, SAC	Map
Benty Grange	✓		21.1	52.0	53.174°N 1.782°W; SK146641	2012		Map
Bonsall Leys	✓		15.4	38.2	53.113°N 1.606°W; SK265574	1993		Map
Boulton Moor		✓	3.9	9.7	52.881°N 1.437°W; SK380316	1992	GCR	Map
Bradbourne Mill Meadows	✓		6.9	17.0	53.068°N 1.704°W; SK199524	2011		Map
Bradwell Dale and Bagshaw Cavern		✓	95.2	235.2	53.321°N 1.748°W; SK169805	1964	GCR	Map
Bradwell Meadows	✓		0.9	2.3	53.322°N 1.736°W; SK177806	1990		Map
Breadsall Railway Cutting	✓	✓	4.9	12.0	52.953°N 1.419°W; SK391397	1986	GCR, LNR, WT	Map
Calke Park	✓		71.1	175.8	52.801°N 1.466°W; SK361227	1992		Map
Calton Hill		✓	5.2	12.7	53.239°N 1.828°W; SK116713	1951	GCR	Map
Carver's Rocks	✓		16.7	41.2	52.8°N 1.512°W; SK330226	1963		Map
Castleton	✓	✓	837.3	2,069.1	53.337°N 1.803°W; SK132823	1954	GCR, NP, NT	Map
Cawdor Quarry		✓	4.7	11.7	53.141°N 1.575°W; SK285605	1963	GCR	Map
Chatsworth Old Park	✓		72.5	179.2	53.217°N 1.606°W; SK264689	1998	NP	Map
Chrome and Parkhouse Hills	✓	✓	30.7	75.9	53.202°N 1.895°W; SK071672	1951	NP, RIGS	Map
Clough Woods	✓		109.4	270.4	53.151°N 1.622°W; SK254616	1964	SM, NP	Map
Colehill Quarries		✓	11.3	27.9	53.092°N 1.574°W; SK286551	1985	GCR	Map
Combs Reservoir	✓		32.0	79.1	53.312°N 1.944°W; SK038794	1986		Map
Coombs Dale	✓		86.0	212.4	53.264°N 1.67°W; SK221742	1954	NP, NCR, SAC	Map
Crabtree Wood	✓		3.5	8.7	53.301°N 1.266°W; SK490785	1981		Map
Cressbrook Dale	✓	✓	120.4	297.6	53.263°N 1.738°W; SK176740	1954	GCR, NNR, NP, NCR, SAC	Map
Creswell Crags		✓	19.5	48.1	53.262°N 1.201°W; SK534742	1981	SM, GCR	Map
Cromford Canal	✓		10.2	25.1	53.097°N 1.518°W; SK324556	1981	LNR, WT	Map
Dale Quarry		✓	2.0	4.9	53.083°N 1.58°W; SK282541	1998	GCR	Map
Dark Peak	✓	✓	31,852.9	78,708.4	53.44°N 1.69°W; SK207937	1951	SPA, GCR, NP, NT, NCR, SAC	Map
Dimminsdale	✓		37.0	91.4	52.791°N 1.444°W; SK376216	1981	WT	Map
Dirtlow Rake and Pindale		✓	23.2	57.4	53.336°N 1.769°W; SK155821	1990	GCR	Map
Doe Lea Stream Section	✓	✓	0.1	0.3	53.218°N 1.314°W; SK459692	1988	GCR, LNR	Map
Dove Valley and Biggin Dale	✓	✓	691.5	1,708.8	53.063°N 1.784°W; SK146518	1954	GCR, NNR, NCR, SAC	Map
Dovedale Wood	✓		13.4	33.2	53.163°N 1.306°W; SK465631	1982	NT	Map
Duchy Quarry		✓	2.4	5.8	53.287°N 1.862°W; SK093767	1985	GCR	Map
Duckmanton Railway Cutting		✓	3.8	9.4	53.228°N 1.368°W; SK423703	1974	GCR	Map
Eastern Peak District Moors	✓	✓	8,193.4	20,246.2	53.204°N 1.548°W; SK303675	1964	SM, SPA, ESA, GCR, WT, NP, NT, SAC	Map
Edale	✓	✓	15.0	37.0	53.365°N 1.857°W; SK096854	1966	GCR, National Trust	Map
Fall Hill Quarry		✓	4.1	10.2	53.158°N 1.474°W; SK353624	1990	GCR	Map
Fox Hole Cave		✓	0.2	0.4	53.192°N 1.853°W; SK099661	1986	GCR	Map
Gang Mine	✓		8.3	20.5	53.098°N 1.574°W; SK286557	1988	NCR, SAC	Map
Ginny Spring, Whitwell Wood	✓		4.0	9.9	53.305°N 1.223°W; SK519789	1963		Map
Goyt Valley	✓	✓	1,332.6	3,292.9	53.268°N 1.959°W; SK028746	1951	SPA, SAC	Map
Green Lane Pits		✓	6.6	16.2	53.16°N 1.755°W; SK165626	1986	GCR	Map
Hallam Barn Grasslands	✓		5.1	12.7	53.347°N 1.719°W; SK188834	2011		Map
Harewood Grange Stream Section		✓	5.9	14.5	53.212°N 1.537°W; SK310684	1963	GCR, NP	Map
Hilton Gravel Pits	✓	✓	31.2	77.0	52.879°N 1.631°W; SK249314	1981	GCR, WT	Map
Hipley Hill	✓		22.1	54.6	53.09°N 1.683°W; SK213548	1963		Map
Hollinhill and Markland Grips	✓		19.9	49.1	53.269°N 1.238°W; SK509749	1963		Map
Hulland Moss	✓		2.8	6.8	53.012°N 1.629°W; SK250461	1981		Map
Hurdlow Meadows	✓		11.3	27.9	53.196°N 1.814°W; SK125666	2005		Map
Jumble Coppice		✓	0.7	1.8	53.245°N 1.6°W; SK268721	1985	GCR	Map
Kedleston Park	✓		93.5	231.1	52.967°N 1.538°W; SK311412	1996		Map
Kirkham's Silica Sandpit		✓	30.4	75.0	53.084°N 1.679°W; SK216541	1992	GCR	Map
Lathkill Dale	✓	✓	273.7	676.3	53.185°N 1.741°W; SK174653	1954	GCR, NNR, NP, NCR, SAC	Map
Lee Farm Meadow, Tideswell	✓		1.5	3.7	53.303°N 1.808°W; SK129785	1986	NP	Map
Leek Moors	✓	✓	3,970.8	9,812.2	53.181°N 1.986°W; SK010649	1954	SPA, ESA, GCR, NP, SAC	Map
Long Dale & Gratton Dale	✓		80.6	199.2	53.138°N 1.698°W; SK203601	1965	NNR, NP, NCR, SAC	Map
Long Dale, Hartington	✓		53.5	132.1	53.151°N 1.795°W; SK138616	1997	SAC	Map
Longstone Moor	✓		106.8	264.0	53.26°N 1.714°W; SK192737	1990	SM, NP	Map
Lower Hollins	✓		5.4	13.2	53.364°N 1.802°W; SK133852	2011		Map
Lower Peaslows Farm Meadow	✓		0.7	1.7	53.323°N 1.883°W; SK079807	2005		Map
Ludworth Intake		✓	5.3	13.0	53.416°N 2.01°W; SJ994910	1998	GCR	Map
Masson Hill		✓	76.1	188.0	53.124°N 1.567°W; SK291586	1989	GCR	Map
Matley Moor Meadows	✓		3.3	8.0	53.402°N 1.965°W; SK024895	2011		Map
Matlock Woods	✓		19.0	46.9	53.112°N 1.561°W; SK295573	1981	SAC	Map
Mercaston Marsh and Muggington Bottoms	✓		14.3	35.4	52.985°N 1.601°W; SK269432	1990		Map
Monk's Dale	✓		105.5	260.8	53.262°N 1.799°W; SK135739	1955	NNR, NP, NCR, SAC	Map
Morley Brick Pits	✓		1.8	4.4	52.971°N 1.424°W; SK388417	1963		Map
Moss Valley	✓		26.1	64.5	53.316°N 1.374°W; SK418801	1951		Map
Moss Valley Meadows	✓		17.9	44.2	53.334°N 1.423°W; SK385820	1990		Map
Moss Valley Woods	✓		17.9	44.2	53.317°N 1.445°W; SK371801	1993		Map
Mount Pleasant	✓		3.0	7.3	53.022°N 1.581°W; SK282473	2011		Map
Ogston Reservoir	✓		95.9	237.0	53.136°N 1.442°W; SK374600	1963		Map
Oxlow Rake	✓		6.0	14.9	53.319°N 1.809°W; SK128803	1992		Map
Parwich Moor	✓		15.8	38.9	53.117°N 1.741°W; SK174578	1965	NP	Map
Pleasley Vale Railway	✓		3.5	8.7	53.178°N 1.223°W; SK520648	1981	LNR	Map
Poole's Cavern and Grin Low Wood		✓	41.5	102.6	53.247°N 1.927°W; SK050722	1963	GCR	Map
Portway Mine		✓	4.2	10.5	53.327°N 1.809°W; SK128811	1990	GCR	Map
River Derwent at Hathersage	✓		7.9	19.4	53.33°N 1.673°W; SK219815	1992		Map
River Mease	✓		22.9	56.5	52.705°N 1.593°W; SK276120	2000	SAC	Map
Rose End Meadows	✓		48.4	119.7	53.107°N 1.591°W; SK275567	1996		Map
Rowlee Bridge		✓	1.0	2.4	53.399°N 1.782°W; SK146891	1986	GCR	Map
Shining Cliff Woods	✓		119.3	294.9	53.075°N 1.504°W; SK333532	1954		Map
South Lee Meadows	✓		2.2	5.3	53.336°N 1.746°W; SK170821	2011		Map
Stoney Middleton Dale		✓	71.3	176.2	53.281°N 1.683°W; SK212761	1972	GCR	Map
Teversal To Pleasley Railway	✓		5.0	12.4	53.165°N 1.272°W; SK488633	1982	LNR, WT	Map
The Wye Valley	✓	✓	595.0	1,470.3	53.238°N 1.717°W; SK190713	1954	GCR, WT, NP, NCR, SAC	Map
Ticknall Quarries	✓	✓	29.5	73.0	52.81°N 1.469°W; SK359237	1963	GCR, NT	Map
Tideslow Rake	✓		9.7	24.0	53.299°N 1.776°W; SK150780	1990	SM, NP	Map
Toddbrook Reservoir	✓		19.4	48.0	53.324°N 1.997°W; SK003808	1963		Map
Topley Pike and Deepdale	✓		65.2	161.0	53.241°N 1.856°W; SK097716	1965	NP, NCR, SAC	Map
Upper Lathkill		✓	26.8	66.3	53.205°N 1.789°W; SK142676	1989	GCR, NP	Map
Via Gellia Woodlands	✓	✓	219.2	541.6	53.108°N 1.594°W; SK273568	1954	GCR, SAC	Map
Wall Lands	✓		8.9	22.1	53.074°N 1.661°W; SK228530	2011		Map
Waterswallows Quarry		✓	0.7	1.7	53.272°N 1.88°W; SK081750	1993	GCR	Map
Wyns Tor		✓	3.1	7.7	53.138°N 1.643°W; SK240602	1972	GCR	Map
Yarncliff Wood, Padley	✓		25.8	63.9	53.31°N 1.623°W; SK252793	1972	NT	Map

== Notes ==
^{A} Data rounded to one decimal place.
^{B} Grid reference is based on the British national grid reference system, also known as OSGB36, and is the system used by the Ordnance Survey. Where an SSSI consists of multiple, non-contiguous sections, each section is assigned its own OS grid reference.
^{C} Link to maps using the Nature on the Map service provided by Natural England.

== See also ==
- List of SSSIs by Area of Search
- List of ancient woods in England
- Derbyshire Wildlife Trust
- Peak District
