= 1908 in the United Kingdom =

rdr

Events from the year 1908 in the United Kingdom.

== Incumbents ==
- Monarch – Edward VII
- Prime Minister - Henry Campbell-Bannerman (Liberal) (until 3 April), H. H. Asquith (Liberal) (starting 5 April)

== Events ==
- 1 January
  - Nimrod Expedition: Ernest Shackleton sets sail from New Zealand on the Nimrod for Antarctica.
  - Harry Bensley leaves for his would-be trip around the world pushing a pram and wearing an iron mask, beginning from Trafalgar Square in London.
- 22 January – Arthur Henderson becomes the second leader of the Labour Party following the resignation of Keir Hardie.
- 24 January – start of publication of Robert Baden-Powell's Scouting for Boys in London. The book will over time sell over 100 million copies and effectively begin the worldwide Boy Scout movement.
- 15 February – weekly boys' story paper The Magnet is first published in London, containing "The Making of Harry Wharton", the first serial story of the fictional Greyfriars School written by Charles Hamilton as Frank Richards and introducing the character of Billy Bunter.
- March – first edition of Arthur Mee's The Children's Encyclopædia in fortnightly parts begins publication in London.
- 1 April – the Territorial Force of the British Army is established by merger of the civilian-organised Volunteer Force with the Yeomanry; and remaining units of the militia are transferred into the regular Special Reserve.
- 7 April – Campbell-Bannerman resigns as Prime Minister on the grounds of health; replaced by Asquith.
- 8 April – David Lloyd George becomes Chancellor of the Exchequer, while Winston Churchill enters the Cabinet for the first time, as President of the Board of Trade.
- 18 April – Manchester United secure the Football League First Division title, the first major trophy of their history.
- 22 April – The sick Henry Campbell-Bannerman dies in the Prime Minister's official residence, 10 Downing Street.
- 1 May–31 October – Scottish National Exhibition is held in Edinburgh
- 1 May – Bournemouth Tramway accident kills 7.
- 11 May – foundation stone of the Royal Liver Building in Liverpool is laid.
- 24 May (Empire Day) – formation of the 1st Arundel (Earl of Arundel's Own) Scout Group (traditionally accepted date although Scouting was probably active in Arundel prior to this).
- 26 May–October – Franco-British Exhibition held at what becomes known as White City, London.
- 29 June – the Apostolic constitution Sapienti consilio, issued by Pope Pius X, brings the Roman Catholic Church in Britain under regular canon law rather than being missionary territory.
- 21 June – first large suffragette rally, in London.
- July – Allied Artists' Association holds its first exhibition, at the Royal Albert Hall.
- 11–12 July – steamship Amalthea, housing 80 British dock strikebreakers in Malmö harbour, Sweden, is bombed by Anton Nilson; 1 is killed, 20 injured.
- 13–25 July – 1908 Summer Olympics held at the White City Stadium as part of the Franco-British Exhibition and of a festival of sport beginning on 14 May. The marathon (starting at Windsor) is run on 24 July and figure skating events are held in Knightsbridge on 28–29 October. The Great Britain and Ireland team win 56 gold, 51 silver and 39 bronze medals.
- 31 July – Irish Universities Act 1908 receives royal assent in Parliament. This provides for establishment of the federal National University of Ireland based in Dublin and the Queen's University of Belfast.
- 1 August – Old Age Pensions Act 1908 receives royal assent in Parliament, providing for a non-contributory pension to be paid (through post offices) to people aged over seventy of limited means but 'good character' from 1 January 1909.
- 14 August – the first beauty pageant with international contestants is held at the Folkestone Pier Hippodrome. The winner is 18-year-old Nellie Jarman from East Molesey.
- 18 August – Maypole Colliery disaster: an underground explosion at Abram in the Lancashire Coalfield, kills 76 miners.
- 31 August–2 September – the Great Storm of 1908 pounds the Bristol Channel.
- 10 September – the first Minas Geraes-class Dreadnought battleship for Brazil, Minas Geraes, is launched at Armstrong Whitworth's yard on the River Tyne.
- October
  - Edith Morley is made Professor of English at University College, Reading, the first woman appointed to a chair at an English university-level institution.
  - First Ideal Home Exhibition held, at Olympia (London) sponsored by the Daily Mail newspaper.
- 1 October – Penny Post is established between the U.K. and United States.
- 13 October – suffragette Margaret Travers Symons becomes the first woman to speak in the House of Commons when she escapes from her escort into the chamber and shouts at those assembled.
- 16 October – American-born Samuel F. Cody makes the first powered fixed-wing aircraft flight in Britain, taking off at the School of Ballooning, Farnborough, Hampshire, in British Army Aeroplane No 1.
- November
  - Horace, Eustace and Oswald Short found Short Brothers, the first aircraft manufacturing company in England, in Battersea, London.
  - The North and South Wales Bank is absorbed into the London City and Midland Bank, bringing an end to banknote issue in Wales.
- 14 November – Dr Elizabeth Garrett Anderson is the first woman in England to be elected as a mayor (of Aldeburgh).
- 3 December – the first performance of Edward Elgar's Symphony No. 1 is given by the Hallé in Manchester's Free Trade Hall.
- 10 December – the National Farmers' Union is founded.
- 21 December – royal assent given to the following Acts of Parliament:
  - Children Act – comes into force 1909, q.v.
  - Prevention of Crime Act – regularises national provision of Borstals.
  - Punishment of Incest Act – makes incest a civil crime for the first time.

=== Undated ===
- Walter Sickert paints the series of problem pictures The Camden Town Murder.
- John Hassall paints the first version of the Jolly Fisherman poster (slogan: Skegness is SO bracing).
- Bisto gravy powder is first marketed.
- Vimto is invented by John Noel Nichols in Manchester. Originally sold under the name Vimtonic, Nichols shortens it to Vimto in 1912.

== Publications ==
- Robert Baden-Powell's book Scouting for Boys.
- G. K. Chesterton's novel The Man Who Was Thursday and his book Orthodoxy.
- W. H. Davies' autobiography The Autobiography of a Super-Tramp.
- E. M. Forster's novel A Room with a View.
- Kenneth Grahame's children's novel The Wind in the Willows.
- E. Nesbit's children's novel The House of Arden.
- H. De Vere Stacpoole's novel The Blue Lagoon.

== Births ==
- 1 January – Grace Hamblin, secretary to the Churchills (died 2002)
- 7 January – Frederick Gibberd, architect (died 1984)
- 8 January – William Hartnell, actor (died 1975)
- 14 January – Barbara Brooke, politician (died 2000)
- 24 January – Duncan Sandys, politician (died 1987)
- 28 January – Jimmy Shand, Scottish accordionist and bandleader (died 2000)
- 30 January – Richard Hearne ("Mr Pastry"), comic performer (died 1979)
- 31 January – Will Atkinson, folk musician (died 2003)
- 4 February – George Rochester, physicist (died 2001)
- 5 February – Daisy and Violet Hilton, conjoined twin actresses (died 1969 in the United States)
- 11 February – Vivian Fuchs, geologist and explorer (died 1999)
- 22 February – John Mills, actor (died 2005)
- 29 February – A. L. Lloyd, folk song collector (died 1982)
- 2 March - Olivia Manning, novelist, poet, writer and reviewer (died 1980)
- 5 March – Rex Harrison, actor (died 1990)
- 12 March
  - Ida Pollock, romance novelist (died 2013)
  - Max Wall, born Maxwell Lorimer, comic performer (died 1990)
- 16 March – Cyril Ray, writer and journalist (died 1991)
- 18 March – Ivor Moreton, singer and pianist (died 1984)
- 19 March – George Rodger, photojournalist (died 1995)
- 20 March – Michael Redgrave, actor (died 1985)
- 25 March
  - David Lean, film director (died 1991)
  - Bridget D'Oyly Carte, head of D'Oyly Carte Opera Company (died 1985)
- 27 March – Semprini, musician (died 1990)
- 29 March – Joan Hocquard, supercentenarian, ambulance driver (died 2020)
- 2 April – Beti Rhys, Welsh author and bookseller (died 2003)
- 6 April – Fram Farrington, scientific officer in Antarctica (died 2002)
- 11 April – Dan Maskell, tennis coach and commentator (died 1992)
- 27 April – Mary Docherty, communist activist (died 2000)
- 30 April – George Grenfell-Baines, architect and town planner (died 2003)
- 3 May – William Glock, music critic (died 2000)
- 14 May – Amy Jagger, gymnast (died 1993)
- 22 May – W. G. Hoskins, landscape historian (died 1992)
- 26 May – Robert Morley, actor (died 1992)
- 27 May – C. Arnold Beevers, crystallographer (died 2001)
- 28 May – Ian Fleming, novelist (died 1964)
- 30 May – Bernard Fitzalan-Howard, 16th Duke of Norfolk, peer and Earl Marshal (died 1975)
- 1 June – Percy Edwards, animal impersonator (died 1996)
- 5 June – Bill Fraser, Scottish actor (died 1987)
- 14 June – Kathleen Raine, poet and critic (died 2003)
- 23 June – Gwyn Davies, Welsh rugby footballer (died 1992)
- 28 June – Norman Lewis, British journalist and author (died 2003)
- 29 June
  - Margaret Hope MacPherson, Scottish crofter (died 2001)
  - Oliver Tomkins, Anglican Bishop of Bristol (died 1992)
- 30 June – Winston Graham, novelist (died 2003)
- 6 July – John Price, English cricketer (died 1992)
- 9 July
  - George Edwards, aircraft designer (died 2003)
  - Ian Mikardo, politician (died 1993)
- 13 July – Alec Rose, sailor (died 1991)
- 25 July – Bill Bowes, cricketer (died 1987)
- 27 July – Hugh Jenkins, politician (died 2004)
- 4 August – Osbert Lancaster, cartoonist (died 1986)
- 5 August – Miriam Rothschild, natural scientist (died 2005)
- 12 August – David Renton, politician (died 2007)
- 21 August – M. M. Kaye, novelist, born in British India (died 2004)
- 23 August – Hannah Frank, artist and sculptor (died 2008)
- 31 August – Kenneth Gandar-Dower, sportsman, aviator, explorer and author (died 1944)
- 6 September
  - Louis Essen, physicist (died 1997)
  - Anthony Wagner, herald at the College of Arms (died 1995)
- 12 September – Reginald C. Fuller, Roman Catholic priest and writer (died 2011)
- 19 October
  - Alan Keith, actor and radio presenter (died 2003)
  - Sydney MacEwan, singer (died 1990)
- 20 October – Desmond Hawkins, author and nature programme producer (died 1999)
- 25 October – Carmen Dillon, film art director and production designer (died 2000)
- 2 November – Fred Bakewell, cricketer (died 1983)
- 11 November – Ralph Kekwick, biochemist (died 2000)
- 20 November – Alistair Cooke, journalist (died 2004)
- 26 November – Charles Forte, Italian-born caterer (died 2007)
- 7 December – Phyllis Barry, English actress (died 1954)
- 14 December – Claude Davey, Welsh rugby union player (died 2001)
- 18 December – Celia Johnson, actress (died 1982)
- 25 December – Quentin Crisp, writer and raconteur (died 1999)
- 29 December – Magnus Pyke, scientist and television presenter (died 1992)

== Deaths ==
- 25 January – Ouida, novelist (born 1839; died in Italy)
- 28 January – Sidney Paget, illustrator (born 1860)
- 6 February – Harriet Samuel, English businesswoman and founder the jewellery retailer H. Samuel (born 1836)
- 22 March – John William Crombie, Scottish woollen manufacturer and politician (born 1858)
- 20 April – Henry Chadwick, baseball writer and historian (born 1824; died in the United States)
- 22 April – Sir Henry Campbell-Bannerman, Prime Minister (born 1836)
- 31 May – Sir John Evans, archaeologist (born 1823)
- 2 June
  - Sir Redvers Buller, general, Victoria Cross recipient (born 1839)
  - William Napier, soldier, Victoria Cross recipient (born 1828)
- 22 July – Sir Randal Cremer, politician and pacifist, recipient of the Nobel Peace Prize (born 1828)
- 25 August – Eyre Massey Shaw, first Chief Officer of the Metropolitan Fire Brigade (London) (born 1828 in Ireland)
- 31 August – Leslie Green, architect (born 1875)
- 21 September – Sir Arnold Burrowes Kemball, general and diplomat (born 1820)
- 16 October – Joseph Leycester Lyne (Father Ignatius of Jesus), Anglican Benedictine abbot (born 1837)
- 8 November – William Edward Ayrton, physicist and electrical engineer (born 1847)
- 17 November – Lydia Thompson, dancer, actress (born 1838)
- 1 December – Howell Jones, Welsh rugby union player (born 1882)

== See also ==
- List of British films before 1920
