= List of Sites of Special Scientific Interest in Merseyside =

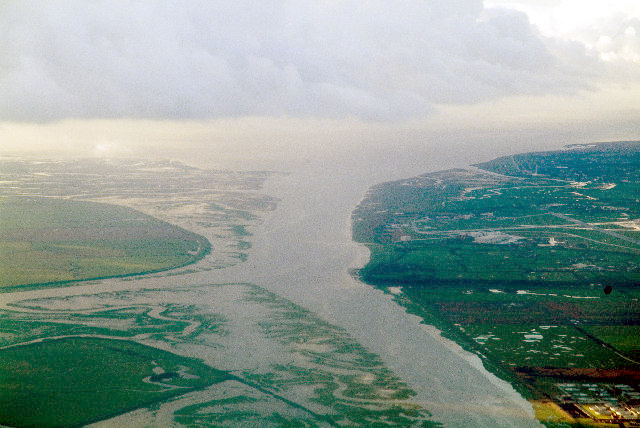
The Ribble Estuary, the largest SSSI in Merseyside.

This is a list of the Sites of Special Scientific Interest (SSSIs) in Merseyside, which is part of North West England. Merseyside has a population of 1,353,600 making it one of the most densely populated areas of the United Kingdom. Geographically, Merseyside is split by the River Mersey which has a surrounding network of canals, rivers and valleys some of which have been created by human activity. Other habitats have been adversely affected by humans including many peat mosslands. As of 2007, There are 14 sites designated within this Area of Search, of which 10 have been designated due to their biological interest, 1 due to its geological interest, and 3 for both biological and geological interest.

In England the body responsible for designating SSSIs is Natural England, which chooses a site because of its fauna, flora, geological or physiographical features. Natural England took over the role of designating and managing SSSIs from English Nature in October 2006 when it was formed from the amalgamation of English Nature, parts of the Countryside Agency and the Rural Development Service. Natural England, like its predecessor, uses the 1974–1996 county system and as such the same approach is followed here, rather than, for example, splitting these sites between the Lancashire and Cheshire lists. The data in the table is taken from English Nature's website in the form of citation sheets for each SSSI.

For other counties, see List of Sites of Special Scientific Interest by Area of Search.

== Sites ==
Site name	Reason for designation		Area^{[A]}		Grid reference^{[B]}	Year in which notified	Map^{[C]}
Site name	Biological interest	Geological interest	Hectares	Acres	Grid reference^{[B]}	Year in which notified	Map^{[C]}
Dee Estuary	✓	✓	14.4	35.6	SJ238832	1979	Map
Dibbinsdale	✓		53.2	131.5	SJ338815	1979	Map
Hesketh Golf Links	✓		14.6	36.1	SD352190	1989	Map
Heswall Dales	✓		29.6	73.1	SJ261821	1979	Map
Meols Meadows	✓		7.1	17.5	SJ245903	1988	Map
Mersey Narrows	✓		117.8	291.1	SJ315949	2000	Map
New Ferry	✓		73.9	182.6	SJ340862	2000	Map
North Wirral Foreshore	✓		2109.9	5213.6	SJ250920	1979	Map
Red Rocks	✓		11.4	28.1	SJ207878	1979	Map
Ribble Estuary^{[D]}	✓		9226.3	22798.2	SD375240	1966	Map
Sefton Coast	✓	✓	4605.3	11380.0	SD295106	2000	Map
Stanley Bank Meadow	✓		14.9	36.8	SJ535972	1986	Map
The Dungeon		✓	1.2	2.8	SJ251831	1977	Map
Thurstaston Common	✓	✓	70.8	174.9	SJ245851	1954	Map

== Notes ==
^{A} Data rounded to one decimal place.
^{B} Grid reference is based on the British national grid reference system, also known as OSGB36, and is the system used by the Ordnance Survey.
^{C} Link to maps using the Nature on the Map service provided by English Nature.
^{D} Ribble Estuary was originally two SSSIs: Southport Sanctuary (designated 1966) and Ribble Estuary (1976). The site also extends into the county of Lancashire and so can be found on the list of SSSIs in Lancashire.
