= List of Sites of Special Scientific Interest in Lancashire =

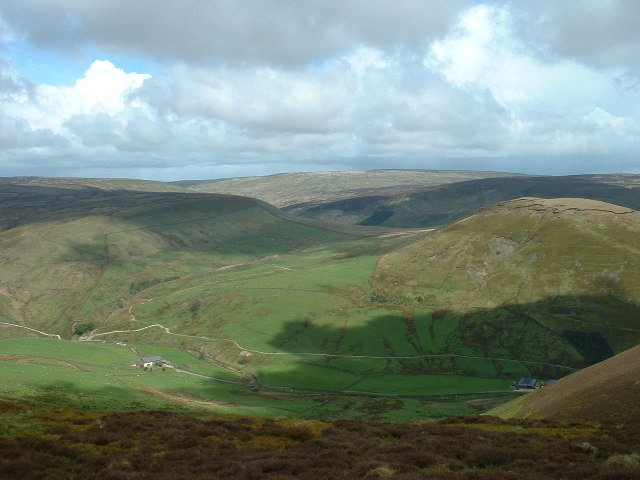
Whin Fell, part of the Bowland Fells SSSI

The list below shows the 69 Sites of Special Scientific Interest (SSSIs) in the Lancashire area of search. Note that English Nature, the designating body for SSSIs in England, uses the 1974-1996 county system, and this list follows the same approach. Some sites that might be expected to be here could therefore be in the Merseyside or Greater Manchester lists.

Of the 69 sites listed, 14 are listed purely for their geological interest, and 49 are listed for biological interest. A further 6 sites have both geological and biological significant features.

For other counties, see List of SSSIs by Area of Search.

== Sites ==
Site name	Reason for designation		Area^{[A]}		Grid reference^{[B]}	Year in which notified	Other designations	Map^{[C]}
Site name	Biological interest	Geological interest	Hectares	Acres	Grid reference^{[B]}	Year in which notified	Other designations	Map^{[C]}
Artle Dale	✓		25.8	63.8	54.06°N 2.698°W; SD544629	1990		Map
Barn Gill Meadow	✓		5.5	13.5	53.987°N 2.412°W; SD731546	1996		Map
Beeston Brook Pasture	✓		1.8	4.5	53.745°N 2.617°W; SD594278	1999		Map
Bell Sykes Meadows	✓		13.8	34.1	53.968°N 2.433°W; SD717525	1999	AONB, SAC	Map
Bowland Fells	✓	✓	16,007.6	39,555.7	53.945°N 2.587°W; SD616500	1988	AONB, SPA, GCR, NCR	Map
Burton Wood	✓		18.5	45.7	54.09°N 2.703°W; SD541662	1984	NCR	Map
Calf Hill And Cragg Woods	✓		34.4	85.1	54.047°N 2.701°W; SD542614	2000	AONB	Map
Charnock Richard Pasture	✓		1.2	2.9	53.632°N 2.662°W; SD563153	1990		Map
Clear Beck Meadow	✓		0.5	1.3	54.103°N 2.589°W; SD616676	1988		Map
Clitheroe Knoll Reefs		✓	117.8	291.0	53.886°N 2.339°W; SD778434	1987	GCR	Map
Cock Wood Gorge		✓	2.8	7.0	53.805°N 2.387°W; SD746344	1983	GCR	Map
Cockerham Marsh	✓		9.8	24.3	53.956°N 2.847°W; SD445514	1985		Map
Coldwell Farm Pasture	✓		0.8	2.0	54.196°N 2.803°W; SD477781	1992		Map
Coplow Quarry		✓	5.2	12.8	53.883°N 2.382°W; SD750431	1983	GCR	Map
Crag Bank	✓		3.7	9.2	54.121°N 2.785°W; SD488697	1985		Map
Cringlebarrow And Deepdale	✓		50.2	123.9	54.171°N 2.774°W; SD496753	1983	SAC	Map
Darwen River Section		✓	6.4	15.7	53.758°N 2.581°W; SD618292	1984	GCR	Map
Downholland Moss		✓	21.8	53.8	53.563°N 3.018°W; SD327079	1990	GCR	Map
Eaves Wood	✓		52.2	129.1	54.18°N 2.82°W; SD466763	1984	NT, NCR	Map
Far Holme Meadow	✓		1.7	4.2	54.084°N 2.543°W; SD646655	1994		Map
Field Head Meadow	✓		3.3	8.1	53.967°N 2.421°W; SD725524	1999	AONB	Map
Gait Barrows	✓	✓	69.8	172.4	54.187°N 2.797°W; SD481771	1984	GCR, NNR, NCR, SAC	Map
Gale Clough And Shooterslee Wood	✓		9.4	23.2	53.623°N 2.454°W; SD701141	1984		Map
Harper Clough And Smalley Delph Quarries		✓	2.9	7.2	53.783°N 2.426°W; SD720319	1984	GCR	Map
Hawes Water	✓		89.4	220.9	54.181°N 2.806°W; SD475764	1986	NNR, NCR, SAC, LNR	Map
Heysham Moss	✓		12.4	30.6	54.039°N 2.884°W; SD422607	1992		Map
Hodder River Section		✓	7.0	17.3	53.854°N 2.455°W; SD702399	1986	GCR	Map
Hodge Clough		✓	2.8	6.8	53.67°N 2.325°W; SD786193	1984	GCR	Map
Jack Scout	✓		6.7	16.7	54.156°N 2.83°W; SD459737	1991	NCR	Map
Langcliff Cross Meadow	✓		5.3	13.0	53.961°N 2.419°W; SD726517	1989	AONB, SAC	Map
Leck Beck Head Catchment Area		✓	691.9	1,709.6	54.208°N 2.509°W; SD669793	1986	GCR	Map
Lee Quarry		✓	49.1	121.4	53.684°N 2.209°W; SD863209	1997	GCR	Map
Leighton Moss	✓		131.6	325.2	54.166°N 2.795°W; SD482748	1984	SPA, NCR, Ramsar site, RSPB	Map
Light Clough		✓	0.5	1.2	53.833°N 2.38°W; SD751375	1984	GCR	Map
Little Mearley Clough		✓	5.9	14.5	53.867°N 2.331°W; SD783412	1986	GCR	Map
Longworth Clough	✓		24.6	60.7	53.631°N 2.461°W; SD696150	1994		Map
Lower Red Lees Pasture	✓		4.0	9.9	53.657°N 2.324°W; SD787179	1994		Map
Lune Estuary	✓		7,633.2	18,862.1	53.987°N 2.926°W; SD394549	1990	SPA, NCR, Ramsar site, SAC	Map
Lytham Coastal Changes		✓	24.9	61.5	53.749°N 2.945°W; SD378285	1999	GCR	Map
Lytham St. Anne's Dunes	✓		24.7	60.9	53.767°N 3.047°W; SD311306	1991	LNR	Map
Martin Mere, Burscough	✓		119.8	295.9	53.624°N 2.878°W; SD420145	1984	SPA, NCR, Ramsar site, WWT	Map
Marton Mere, Blackpool	✓		39.5	97.6	53.81°N 2.999°W; SD343353	1984	LNR	Map
Mere Sands Wood	✓	✓	41.9	103.6	53.635°N 2.838°W; SD447157	1985	GCR, WT	Map
Morecambe Bay	✓		25,665.2	63,420.2	54.106°N 2.976°W; SD363682	1990	AONB, SPA, NP, NCR, Ramsar site, RSPB, SAC	Map
Myttons Meadows	✓		10.1	25.0	53.974°N 2.459°W; SD700532	1985	AONB, SAC	Map
New Ing Meadow	✓		2.1	5.2	53.95°N 2.325°W; SD788505	1992		Map
Newton Marsh	✓		66.0	163.1	53.755°N 2.836°W; SD450291	1986		Map
Oak Field	✓		21.1	52.1	53.633°N 2.463°W; SD695153	1985		Map
Ravenhead Brickworks		✓	22.1	54.6	53.537°N 2.736°W; SD513047	2002	GCR	Map
Red Scar And Tun Brook Woods	✓		63.6	157.2	53.784°N 2.63°W; SD586321	1986	WT	Map
Ribble Estuary	✓		9,348.5	23,100.5	53.714°N 2.991°W; SD347246	1984	SPA, NNR, NCR, Ramsar site	Map
Robert Hall Moor	✓		19.7	48.8	54.113°N 2.566°W; SD631687	1985		Map
Roeburndale Woods	✓		41.7	103.0	54.084°N 2.601°W; SD608655	1984	NCR	Map
Rough Hey Wood	✓		6.2	15.2	53.879°N 2.73°W; SD521428	1984		Map
Salthill And Bellmanpark Quarries	✓	✓	17.6	43.6	53.879°N 2.37°W; SD758426	1987	GCR, LNR	Map
Silverdale Golf Course	✓		0.6	1.5	54.173°N 2.81°W; SD472755	1998	AONB	Map
South Pennine Moors	✓	✓	20,944.5	51,755.0	53.811°N 2.062°W; SD960350	1994	SPA, SAM, ESA, GCR, NT, SAC	Map
Standridge Farm Pasture	✓		4.5	11.1	53.976°N 2.409°W; SD733534	1998	AONB	Map
Tarnbrook Meadows	✓		11.9	29.3	53.994°N 2.634°W; SD585555	1989		Map
Thrang End And Yealand Hall Allotment	✓		51.5	127.2	54.181°N 2.784°W; SD489764	1987	SAC	Map
Thrang Wood	✓		4.8	11.8	54.186°N 2.794°W; SD483770	1999	AONB, SAC	Map
Thwaite House Moss	✓		7.3	17.9	54.113°N 2.772°W; SD496689	2004		Map
Trowbarrow Quarry	✓	✓	7.5	18.4	54.178°N 2.798°W; SD480761	1990	GCR, LNR	Map
Warton Crag	✓		72.7	179.6	54.148°N 2.778°W; SD493727	1986	NCR, LNR	Map
White Coppice Flush	✓		0.5	1.3	53.672°N 2.575°W; SD621197	1985		Map
White Moss	✓		12.3	30.4	53.987°N 2.319°W; SD792546	1985		Map
Winmarleigh Moss	✓		89.3	220.6	53.924°N 2.847°W; SD445479	1991		Map
Wrightington Bar Pasture	✓		1.3	3.3	53.614°N 2.698°W; SD539133	1992		Map
Wyre Estuary	✓		1,481.8	3,661.6	53.862°N 2.976°W; SD359411	1995	SPA, WT, Ramsar site, SAC	Map

== Notes ==
^{A} Reason for designation; either for the site's biological interest, or its geological interest.
^{B} Data rounded to one decimal place.
^{C} Grid reference is based on the British national grid reference system, also known as OSGB36, and is the system used by the Ordnance Survey.
^{D} Link to maps using the Nature on the Map service provided by Natural England.
