= List of Sites of Special Scientific Interest in Greater Manchester =

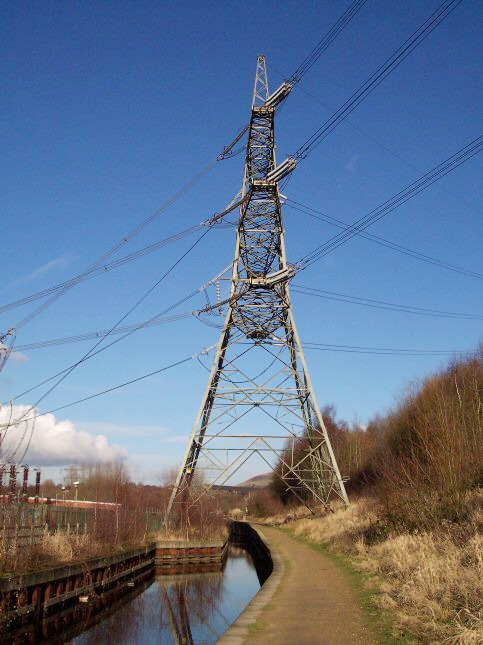
Huddersfield Narrow Canal close to Stalybridge.

This is a list of the Sites of Special Scientific Interest (SSSIs) in Greater Manchester, a metropolitan county in North West England. In England the body responsible for designating SSSIs is Natural England, which chooses a site because of its fauna, flora, geological or physiographical features. As of 2006, there are 21 sites designated within this Area of Search, of which 14 have been designated due to their biological interest, 5 due to their geological interest, and 2 for both biological and geological interest.

Natural England took over the role of designating and managing SSSIs from English Nature in October 2006 when it was formed from the amalgamation of English Nature, parts of the Countryside Agency and the Rural Development Service. Natural England, like its predecessor, uses the 1974–1996 county system and as such the same approach is followed here, rather than splitting these sites between the Lancashire and Cheshire lists. The data in the table is taken from English Nature's website in the form of citation sheets for each SSSI.

For other counties, see List of SSSIs by Area of Search.

== Sites ==
Site name	Reason for Designation		Area^{[A]}		Grid reference^{[B]}	Year in which notified	Map^{[C]}
Site name	Biological interest	Geological interest	Hectares	Acres	Grid reference^{[B]}	Year in which notified	Map^{[C]}
Abram Flashes	✓		39.6	98.0	SD610003	1990	Map
Ashclough		✓	5.8	14.3	SD763063 & SD757063	1988	Map
Astley & Bedford Mosses	✓		92.2	227.8	SJ692975	1989	Map
Brookheys Covert	✓		2.4	5.8	SJ742904	1977	Map
Bryn Marsh & Ince Moss	✓		68.3	168.8	SD585025 & SD595025	1989	Map
Compstall Nature Reserve	✓		12.8	31.6	SJ976917	1977	Map
Cotteril Clough	✓		10.3	25.5	SJ805839	1951	Map
Dark Peak^{[D]}	✓	✓	31,852.9	78,708.4	SK110960	1951	Map
Dunham Park	✓		78.0	192.7	SJ740870	1965	Map
Gale Clough And Shooterslee Wood^{[E]}	✓		8.6	21.2	SD702141	1979	Map
Highfield Moss	✓		21.3	52.6	SJ614956	1986	Map
Hollinwood Branch Canal	✓		3.3	8.2	SJ910993–SJ920004	1986	Map
Huddersfield Narrow Canal	✓		18.4	45.5	SJ936986–SD981033	1988	Map
Ladcastle and Den Quarries		✓	2.5	6.2	SD995060	1984	Map
Lowside Brickworks		✓	1.4	3.5	SD941041	1989	Map
Ludworth Intake^{[F]}		✓	5.1	12.7	SJ994911	1998	Map
Nob End	✓		8.8	21.7	SD749063	1988	Map
Red Moss	✓		47.2	116.6	SD635104	1995	Map
Rochdale Canal	✓		25.6	63.1	SD937161–SD891009	2000	Map
South Pennine Moors^{[G]}	✓	✓	20,938.1	51,739.0	SD920300	1994	Map
Tonge River Section		✓	0.7	1.8	SD726095	1987	Map

== Notes ==
^{A} Data rounded to one decimal place.
^{B} Grid reference is based on the British national grid reference system, also known as OSGB36, and is the system used by the Ordnance Survey.
^{C} Link to maps using the Nature on the Map service provided by Natural England.
^{D} The Gale Clough and Shooterslee Wood site extends into the county of Lancashire and so can be found on the list of SSSIs in Lancashire.
^{E} The Dark Peak site extends into three other counties and so can be found on lists of SSSIs in Derbyshire, South Yorkshire and West Yorkshire.
^{F} The Ludworth Intake site extends into the county of Derbyshire and so can be found on the list of SSSIs in Derbyshire.
^{G} The South Pennine Moors site extends into three other counties and so can be found on lists of SSSIs in Lancashire, North Yorkshire and West Yorkshire.
