= Wigan urban area =

Coordinates: 53.544°N 2.631°W

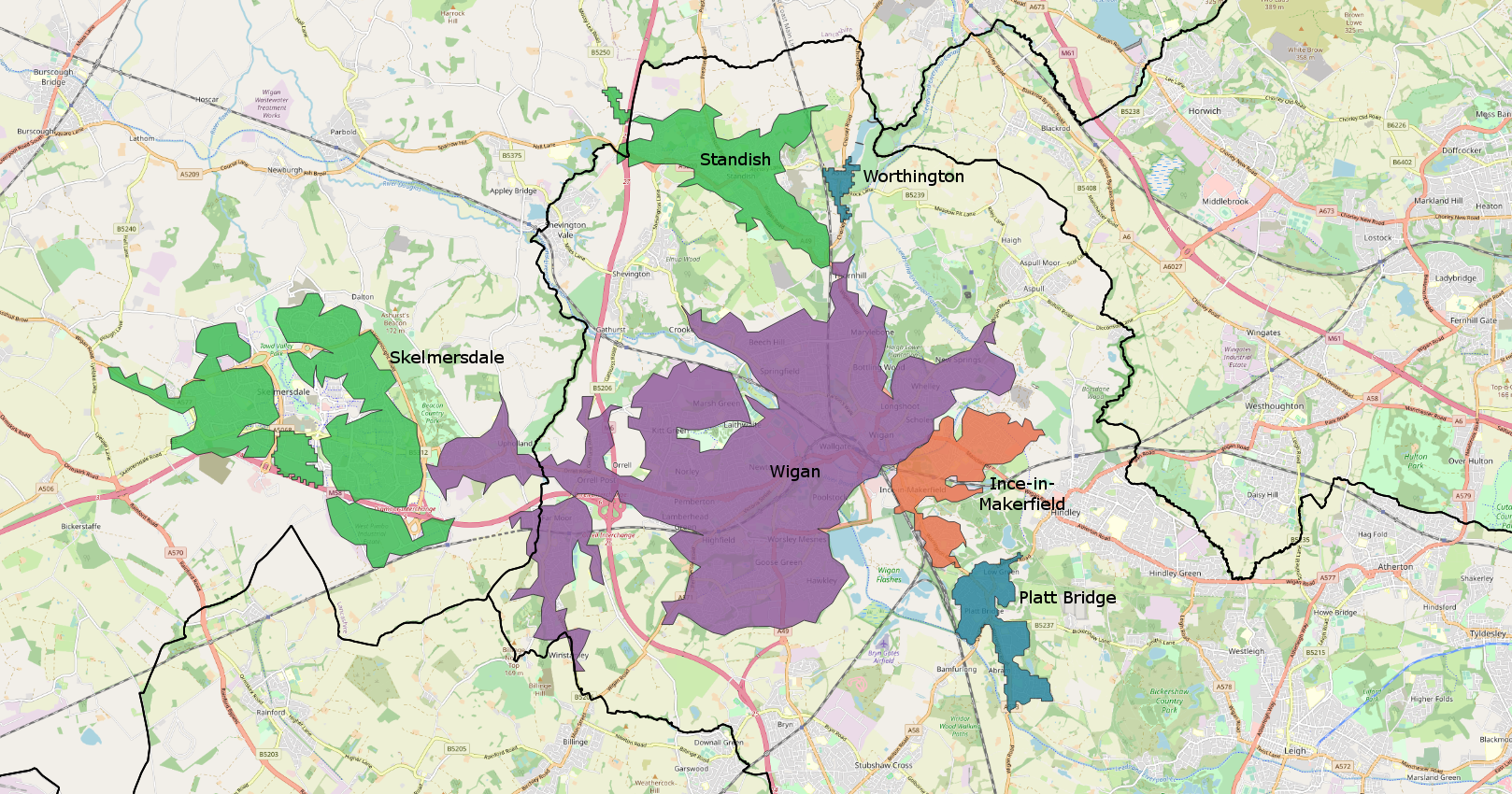
The subdivisions of the Wigan Built-up Area highlighted.

The Wigan Urban Area is an area of land defined by the Office for National Statistics consisting of the built-up, or 'urbanised' area containing Wigan in Greater Manchester and Skelmersdale in West Lancashire.

The Urban Area includes the integrated conurbation around Wigan, (containing the contiguous areas of Ince-in-Makerfield and Wigan itself), along with the outlying areas of Standish, Abram and the West Lancashire town of Skelmersdale.

The Wigan Urban Area has a total population of 175,405. This is an increase of 5% on the 2001 figure of 166,840.

== Constituent parts ==
The historic town of Wigan forms an integrated conurbation along with the Metropolitan Borough of Wigan district of Ince-in-Makerfield, which is connected by ribbon development to Standish, Platt Bridge and Abram. Together with Skelmersdale in West Lancashire, these areas are defined by the Office for National Statistics as the Wigan Urban Area.

=== Breakdown ===
The ONS figures were broken down into constituent parts, and an individual population figure was given for each. These were:

| Rank (2011) | Urban sub-area name | 2011 | 2001 | 1991 | 1981 |
|---|---|---|---|---|---|
| 1 | Wigan | 103,608 | 81,203 | 85,819 | 88,901 |
| 2 | Skelmersdale | 34,535 | 39,279 | 42,104 | 42,609 |
| 3 | Standish | 13,701 | 14,350 | 12,196 | 11,532 |
| 4 | Ince in Makerfield | 12,243 | 10,941 | 10,554 | 11,013 |
| 5 | Abram/Platt Bridge | 10,315 | 9,855 | 11,482 | 12,423 |
| 6 | Worthington | 1,083 | | | |
| | Orrell | | 11,212 | 12,251 | 12,600 |
| | Total | 175,485 | 166,840 | 174,406 | 179,078 |

Notes

- Orrell is included under the Wigan subdivision in the 2011 census data.
- The Abram subdivision was renamed Platt Bridge in the 2011 census.
- The Worthington subdivision was part of the Standish subdivision in the 2001 census.
