= Abram Council Offices =

Municipal building in Abram, Greater Manchester, England

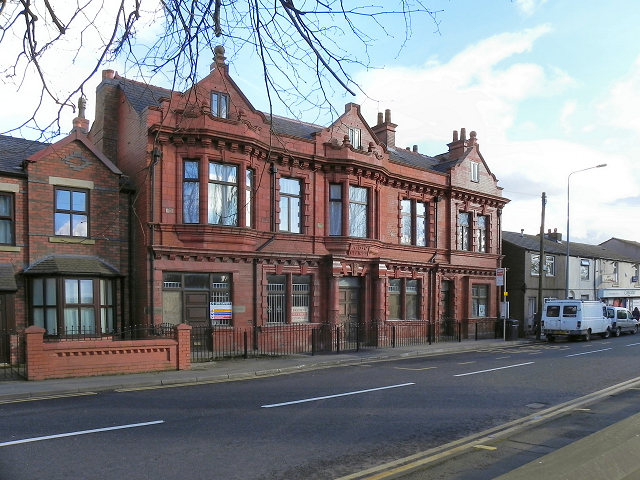
- Abram Council Offices

- Shown in Greater Manchester
- 53.5092°N 2.5925°W
- Location: Warrington Road, Abram

History
- Built: 1903

Site notes
- Architect(s): Heaton, Ralph and Heaton
- Architectural style: Edwardian Baroque style

Abram Council Offices is a municipal building in Warrington Road, Abram, Greater Manchester, England. The building is currently used as private apartments.

== History ==
After significant industrial growth in the mid-19th century, largely associated with the coal mining industry, a local board of health was formed in 1880. The local board initially established its offices at Abram Brow, just off Warrington Road. Abram became an urban district in 1894 and, in this context, civic leaders decided to erect new offices on the east side of Warrington Road. The site faced a graveyard which included a memorial to the 75 men and boys who had died in a pit explosion at Maypole Colliery in August 1908.

The building was designed by Heaton, Ralph and Heaton in the Edwardian Baroque style, built in red brick and was completed in 1903. The design involved an asymmetrical main frontage of five bays facing onto Warrington Road. The central bay featured a doorway with an architrave and a keystone inscribed with the date of completion. The doorway was flanked by ornately carved columns supporting a cornice, above which there was a stone panel inscribed with the words "ADC Offices". There was an oriel window on the first floor and a small casement window in the moulded gable above. The left-hand outer bay contained a doorway on the ground floor and was fenestrated by an oriel window on the first floor and by a small casement window in the moulded gable above. The right-hand outer bay contained a doorway and a mullioned and transomed window on the ground floor, a pair of windows on the first floor and a small casement window in the moulded gable above. There was a prominent modillioned cornice above the first floor windows. Internally, the principal room was the council chamber, which hosted monthly meetings of the urban district council.

The building continued to serve as the offices of Abram Urban District Council for much of the 20th century, but ceased to be the local seat of government when Wigan Metropolitan Borough Council was formed in 1974. The building was subsequently sold to a developer, renamed "Maypole Hall" in recognition of the nearby pit where the explosion had taken place, and converted into apartments.
