= Listed buildings in Abram, Greater Manchester =

Abram is a village in the Metropolitan Borough of Wigan, Greater Manchester, England. The village and the settlement of Platt Bridge contain two listed buildings that are recorded in the National Heritage List for England. Both the listed buildings are designated at Grade II, the lowest of the three grades, which is applied to "buildings of national importance and special interest". The listed buildings are a house and a farmhouse.

== Buildings ==
Name and location	Photograph	Date	Notes
Brookside Farmhouse; 53.51603°N 2.58390°W	—	1716	The farmhouse is in painted brick with a stone-slate roof. There are two storeys and three bays, the right bay gabled. The doorway has a segmental head, most of the windows are casements, and there is a horizontally-sliding sash window. On the front is decorative brickwork in the form of hearts, and in the gable is a datestone.
126 Warrington Road; 53.51351°N 2.59634°W	—	Mid-18th century	A brick house with a slate roof, two storeys, a double-depth plan and two bays. It has a central doorway and horizontally-sliding sash windows, those on the ground floor with segmental brick arches.
