= List of Sites of Special Scientific Interest in West Yorkshire =

This is a list of the Sites of Special Scientific Interest (SSSIs) in West Yorkshire. English Nature, the designating body for SSSIs in England, uses the 1974–1996 county system, and the same approach is followed here, rather than, for example, merging all Yorkshire sites into a single list.

For other counties, see List of SSSIs by Area of Search.

== Sites ==
Site name	Reason for designation		Area^{[A]}		Grid reference^{[B]}	Year in which notified	Map^{[C]}	Citation^{[D]}
Site name	Biological interest	Geological interest	Hectares	Acres	Grid reference^{[B]}	Year in which notified	Map^{[C]}	Citation^{[D]}
Bingley South Bog	✓		4.0	9.9	SE115386	1990	Map	
Breary Marsh	✓		9.5	23.5	SE264416	1983	Map	
Broadhead Clough	✓		63.8	157.6	SE996250	1983/84	Map	
Crimsworth Dean		✓	13.8	34.1	SD988293, SD994325	1984	Map	
Dark Peak	✓	✓	31,852.9	78,708.4	SK110960	1993	Map	
Denby Grange Colliery Ponds	✓		19.1	47.2	SE271152	1997	Map	
Eccup Reservoir	✓		114.5	282.9	SE300417	1987	Map	
Elland Bypass Cutting	✓		1.1	2.7	SE119202	1989	Map	
Fairburn And Newton Ings	✓		168.1	415.4	SE453275	1984	Map	
Great Dib Wood		✓	1.1	2.7	SE199443	1984	Map	
Hetchell Wood	✓		14.2	35.3	SE376424	1983	Map	
Honley Station Cutting		✓	0.4	1.0	SE145126	1989	Map	
Hook Moor	✓		1.7	4.2	SE434355	1989	Map	
Leeds and Liverpool Canal	✓		19.5	48.2	SE213374	1984	Map	
Linton Common	✓		0.7	1.7	SE384465	1984	Map	
Madbanks And Ledsham Banks	✓		6.2	15.2	SE452290, SE461301	1984	Map	
Micklefield Quarry		✓	0.6	1.5	SE446325	1990	Map	
Mickletown Ings	✓		38.3	94.6	SE403275	1983	Map	
Norwood Bottoms	✓		11.0	27.2	SE387416	1986	Map	
Nostell Brickyard Quarry	✓		12.5	31.0	SE403170		Map	
Park Clough		✓	0.5	1.2	SE030125	1984	Map	
Rake Dike		✓	4.7	11.6	SE094048, SE112058	1986	Map	
Roach Lime Hills	✓		5.4	13.4	SE418315	1983	Map	
Seckar Wood	✓		46.4	114.6	SE326143	1984	Map	
South Elmsall Quarry		✓	0.3	0.7	SE484116	1990	Map	
South Pennine Moors	✓	✓	20,938.0	51,740.0	SD920300	1994	Map	
Standedge Road Cutting		✓	3.5	8.5	SE018095 – SE023098	1984	Map	
Townclose Hills	✓		12.1	30.0	SE407304	1984	Map	
Trench Meadows	✓		4.7	11.6	SE131387	1999	Map	
Wentbridge Ings	✓		1.9	4.8	SE477181	1987	Map	
Withens Clough	✓		3.0	7.4	SD989234	1984	Map	
Yeadon Brickworks And Railway Cutting		✓	3.3	8.2	SE193408	1984	Map	

== Notes ==
^{A} Data rounded to one decimal place.
^{B} Grid reference is based on the British national grid reference system, also known as OSGB36, and is the system used by the Ordnance Survey.
^{C} Link to maps using the Nature on the Map service provided by English Nature.
^{D} English Nature citation sheets for each SSSI. Retrieved on 27 August 2012.
