= Stanley Bank Meadow =

- Site of Special Scientific Interest
- Location within Merseyside
- Location of Stanley Bank Meadow.
- Area of search: Merseyside
- Grid reference: SJ535972
- Coordinates: 53.467°N 2.717°W
- Interest: Biological
- Area: 14.9 ha (37 acres)
- Notification date: 1986

Stanley Bank Meadow is a 14.9-hectare (37-acre) Site of Special Scientific Interest situated 2.8km north-east of St Helens. The site was notified in 1988 due to its biological features which is predominantly damp unimproved neutral grassland, which is a rare habitat in Merseyside. It is also part of a larger area which is a Local Nature Reserve called Stanley Bank.

== Land ownership ==
All land within Stanley Bank Meadow SSSI is owned by the local authority.
