= Matley Moor Meadows =

Protected area in Derbyshire, England

Coordinates: 53.403217°N 1.9653669°W

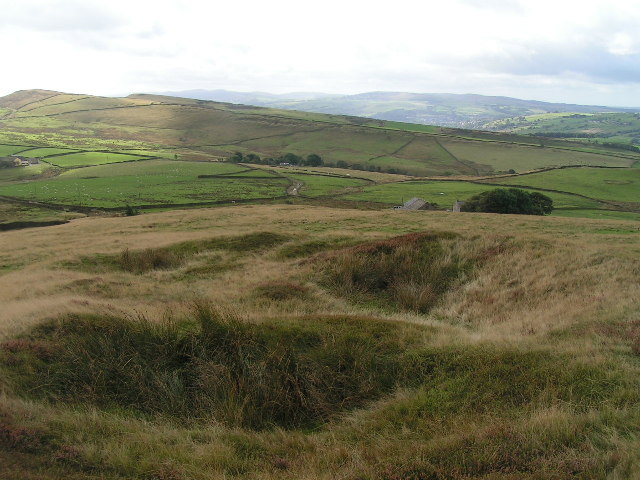
Matley Moor

Matley Moor Meadows is a Site of Special Scientific Interest (SSSI) within the Peak District National Park in Derbyshire, England. It is 2 kilometres (1.2 mi) northwest of the hamlet of Little Hayfield. These meadows are a protected area because of the species-rich grassland present.

== Biology ==
Plant species in these meadows include autumn hawkbit, tormentil, common knapweed, ox-eye daisy, common cat's-ear, yellow rattle, harebell, common spotted orchid, great burnet, and common eyebright.

== Geology ==
This site overlays rocks of the Millstone Grit series.
