= Ticknall Quarries =

Protected area in England

Coordinates: 52°48′36″N 1°28′12″W

Ticknall Quarries is a Site of Special Scientific Interest (SSSI) in Derbyshire, England. It is located either side of the main street in Ticknall. This protected area is important both for its distinctive limestone geology and for important grassland habitats.

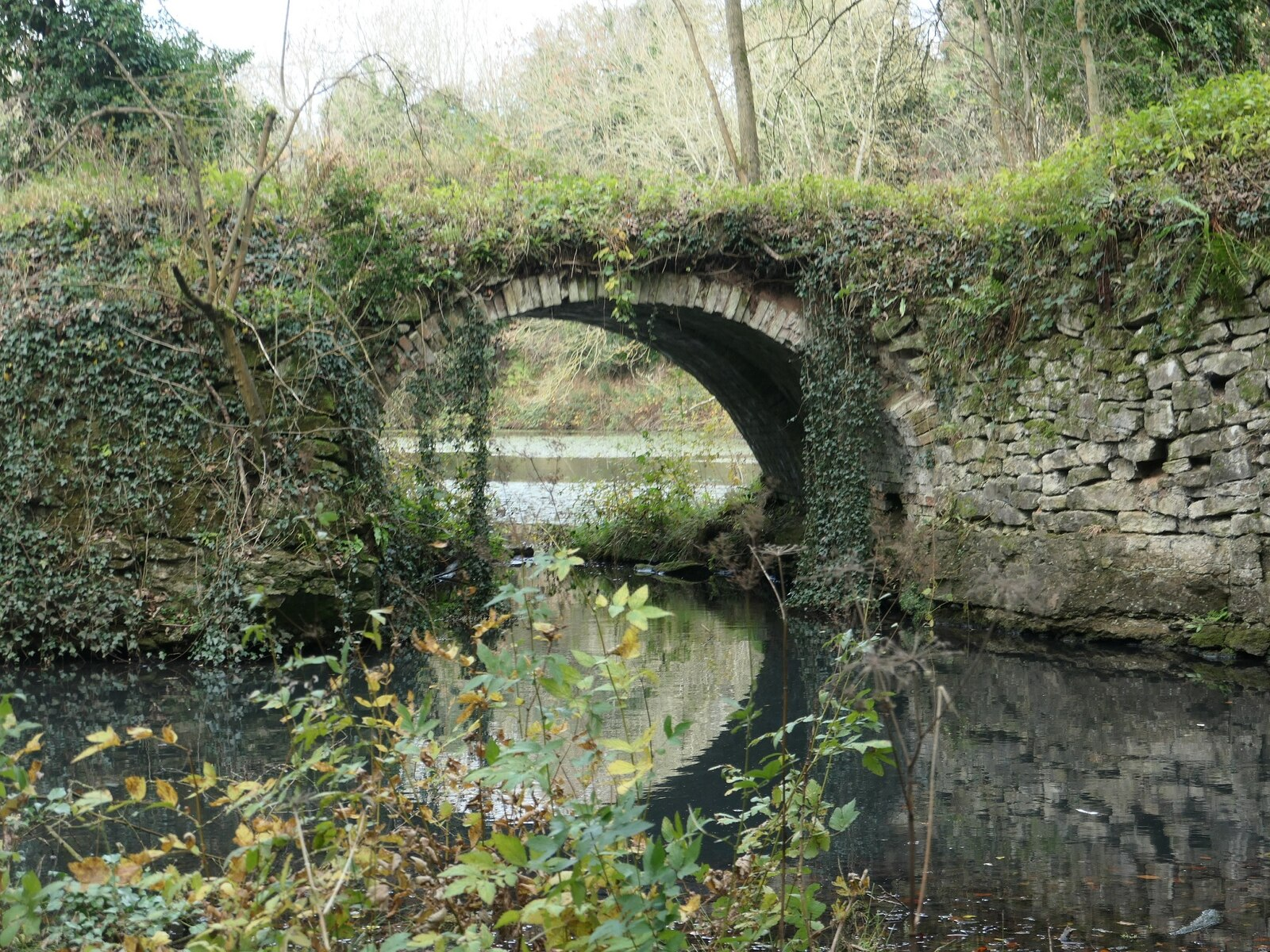
Bridge between two flooded quarries, Ticknall limeyards

== Geology ==
This protected area is on Carboniferous Limestone from the Dinantian Stage. The rocks are an important source of fossils. Mining and industrial activity has occurred at this site since the nineteenth century, resulting in a landscape modified by spoil heaps and discarded stone. This site includes the remains of nineteenth century lime kilns and remains of a tramway that are listed as historical monuments.

== Biology ==
This protected area contains semi-natural woodland where a dominant tree species is ash. Plant species in this woodland also include travellers-joy and dog's mercury. This protected area also contains unimproved limestone grassland where recorded plant species include autumn gentian, common centaury and bee orchid.

== Land ownership ==
All land within Ticknall Quarries SSSI is owned by the National Trust. The National Trust refer to this site with the name Ticknall Lime and Brick Yards, Calke Abbey.
