= William Napier (VC) =

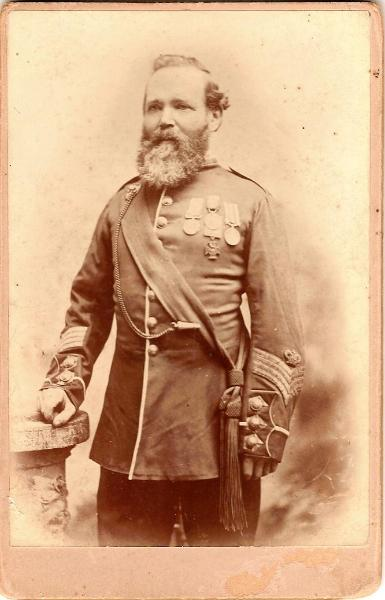
- Born: 20 August 1824; Keighley, Yorkshire, England
- Died: 2 June 1908 (aged 80); Rochester, Victoria, Australia
- Burial place: Bendigo Cemetery, Bendigo, Victoria
- Military career
- Allegiance: United Kingdom
- Branch: British Army
- Service years: 1846–1862
- Rank: Sergeant
- Units: 13th Regiment of Foot
- Conflicts: Crimean War; Indian Mutiny
- Awards: Victoria Cross

William Napier VC (20 August 1828 – 2 June 1908) was an English recipient of the Victoria Cross, the highest and most prestigious award for gallantry in the face of the enemy that can be awarded to British and Commonwealth forces.

== Early life ==
William Napier was born at Keighley in Yorkshire, England on 20 August 1824, the son of Samuel Slater and his wife Mary (née Hartley).

William was educated at a private school and grew up in a military family. His uncle William Napier was a Grenadier Guard (2nd Battalion), who fought at the Battle of Waterloo in 1815 and was awarded the Waterloo Medal which he gave to William. By the time William had left school he had the urge to join the army. On 10 December 1846 he enlisted at Leeds, Yorkshire with the 13th Light Infantry.

== Crimea ==
In 1855 William Napier left the England with the 1st Battalion, 13th (1st Somersetshire) (Prince Albert's Light Infantry) Regiment of Foot under General Lord Mark Kerr, G.C.B., and arrived at Balaklava, Crimean peninsula, by sea on 29 June 1855.

William described Sevastopol as follows in 1897:

The mortality was fearful, but that the losses in battle were not more than one half of those caused by fever, and the hardships of camp life in that rigorous climate. Not long before the outbreak of the war, I saw a regiment of the Grenadier Guards paraded at Gibraltar, 900 strong. Afterwards I saw them paraded in the Crimea, when only 82 of all ranks answered the roll call. Of the 800 odd who were absent, not more than 300 had fallen in battle.

The French had the honour of sealing the fate of Sevastopol. On 8 September 1855, they captured the Malakoff, the most formidable of its fortresses. The war was now virtually over. A treaty was concluded in March 1856. Following the battle at Sevastopol, Sergeant William Napier was awarded the Crimea Medal with clasp and the Turkish Medal.

He fought in the following battles in the Crimea:

- 16 August 1855, Battle of the Chernaya, Crimea
- 6 and 7 September 1855, in the trenches at Sevastopol
- 8 September 1855 – 1856, Capture of Redan and the fall of Sevastopol

== Indian Mutiny ==
In May 1857 the native troops at Meerut mutinied, and the remainder of troops throughout Bengal soon followed their example. On 30 August 1857, the 1st Battalion under the command of Lord Mark Kerr, embarked at Port Elizabeth (South Africa) at 24 hours' notice, for India, and landed at Calcutta on 3 October 1857. On 27 March 1858, Lord Mark Kerr received orders from the Viceroy to march to the relief of Azimghur, which is about 50 miles north of Benares. They arrived at Azimghur on 5 April 1858, and commenced fighting the next morning.

In this action Sergeant William Napier saw Private Benjamin Milnes lying severely wounded and went to his rescue. While surrounded by sepoys he bandaged Private Milnes wounds. Suddenly he was shot at, leaving a gaping wound over his left eye. Blinded by the blood pouring down his face, Sergeant Napier continued to fight back until he finally picked up Private Milnes and carried him to safety. This daring act was sufficient to induce Lord Mark Kerr to ask the sergeant whether he would like a commission. The sergeant declined that honour. For his heroism he was specially mentioned in dispatches and received the Victoria Cross and promotion to the rank of Sergeant Major.

Through to December 1858 he fought in the following battles in India:

- Belwah
- Captaingunge
- Bustee
- Hurryah
- Debreheah
- Judgespore
- Bhanpore
- Domereagunge
- Toolsepore

In October 1862, Sergeant-Major William Napier VC, was in transit to Calcutta, and on 8 December 1862, he was discharged.

== Australia ==
He left Calcutta on 21 December 1862 at 8:38 pm on the Madras and arrived in Melbourne, Australia in January 1863.

William found work as a clerk and later met and married Elizabeth Slater, the daughter of William and Margaret Slater of Ripon, Yorkshire, England, on 16 September 1863 in Melbourne. William and Elizabeth had a son, Alfred Stephen Slater Napier, and a daughter, Mary Elizabeth Napier, who both died in infancy. Elizabeth Napier died 25 April 1867, age 37.

William Napier married secondly, Ruth Ann Hirst, widow of Joseph Graham Hirst of Thornes by Wakefield, Yorkshire and daughter of Thomas Crompton Booth of Sowerby, Yorkshire, on 5 November 1869, at Bendigo, Victoria.

William Napier worked as a clerk and then a miner for a short time before he became a cordial manufacturer based in Mackey Street, Rochester, Victoria. William was a member and treasurer of the Rochester branch of the Masons. He was involved in many duties in Rochester and was listed as a pioneer of the district.

Sergeant-Major William Napier moved to Melbourne after his property burnt down. After a few years in Melbourne he became sick and returned to Rochester in 1907. He stayed with John and Ethel Abbey in Mackey Street next to where his home once was. He died on 2 June 1908 at the Abbey home, leaving his wife Ruth Ann Napier and his adopted stepdaughter Eliza. Ruth Ann Napier and her daughter moved to Western Australia. Ruth died at her grandson Ernest Alfred Winch's home in 1924.

== Further information ==
His adopted stepdaughter Eliza married William Henry Winch, ancestor of Lord John Napier-Winch of Western Australia. William Napier's personal belongings are now held by Lord John Napier-Winch.

== The medal ==
His Victoria Cross is displayed at Somerset Military Museum, Taunton, Somerset, England.
