= South Lee Meadows =

Protected area in Derbyshire, England

Coordinates: 53.3359°N 1.7437°W

South Lee Meadows is a Site of Special Scientific Interest (SSSI) within Peak District National Park in Derbyshire, England. It is located 930m north of the village of Bradwell and is situated between Eden Tree Caravan Park and Hope Cement Works, along a tributary to the River Noe. These meadows are protected because of the floodplain grassland present.

== Biology ==
Plant species in the meadow vegetation include great burnet, meadowsweet, meadow buttercup, lady's smock, water avens, common knapweed and meadow vetchling. In areas where there is shallow peat, plant species include devil's-bit scabious, marsh marigold, ragged robin, and marsh valerian.

== Geology ==
This protected area is situated where Carboniferous limestones meet the shales of the Millstone Grit series.
