= Calton Hill, Derbyshire =

Protected area in Derbyshire, England

Coordinates: 53.240395°N 1.823151°W

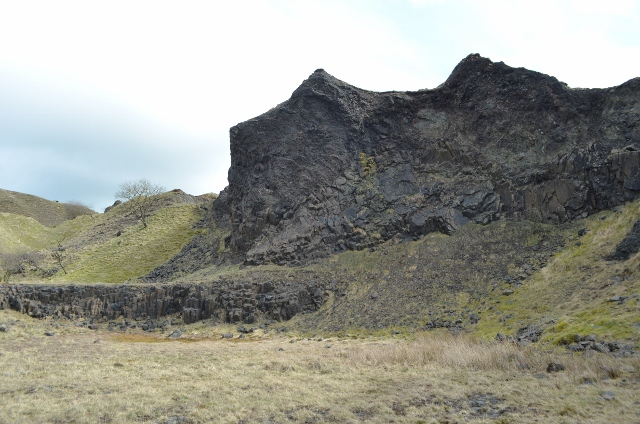
Calton Hill quarry

Calton Hill is a Site of Special Scientific Interest in Derbyshire, England, showing Olivine Diorite magma chamber.

It is the site of an extinct volcano and the quarrying that has now been abandoned means that it is possible to observe the geological structures caused by the repeated eruptions. The eruptions were small and were then underwater as Derbyshire was covered by a sea in the Carboniferous period (around 330 million years ago).

Research by geologists Sheldrick et al. (2025) provided a precise ^{40}Ar-^{39}Ar radiometric date of 316.4 Ma (+/- 3.7 Ma) for the Complex which may reflect rejuvenated mantle plume magmatism.

The nearest place is Blackwell and the nearest town is Buxton to the west.
