= Jack Scout =

Protected area in Lancashire, England

Coordinates: 54°09′25″N 2°49′44″W

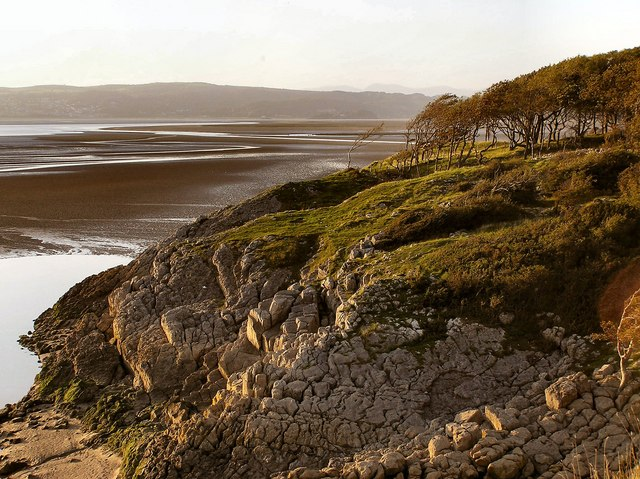
Jack Scout

Jack Scout is a Site of Special Scientific Interest (SSSI) within Arnside and Silverdale National Landscape in Lancashire, England. This protected area is located 2km southwest of Silverdale and it borders the much larger protected area called Morecambe Bay SSSI. This protected area has exceptional calcareous grassland important for its plant diversity. This protected area has a small area of limestone pavement.

== Biology ==
There is semi-natural woodland in this protected area where tree species include ash, silver birch, hazel, rowan, sessile oak, lancastrian whitebeam, rock whitebeam and small-leaved lime. There is an exceptional diversity of herbs in calcareous grassland, including squinancy wort, green-winged orchid, Autumn lady's tresses, dropwort; and where there are deeper soils formed from loess deposits, herbs include autumn gentian and field gentian.

== Geology ==
The underlying geology is Carboniferous limestone.

== Land ownership ==
All land in Jack Scout SSSI is owned by the National Trust.
