= Moss Valley Meadows =

Protected area in Derbyshire, England

Coordinates: 53°19′39″N 1°25′21″W

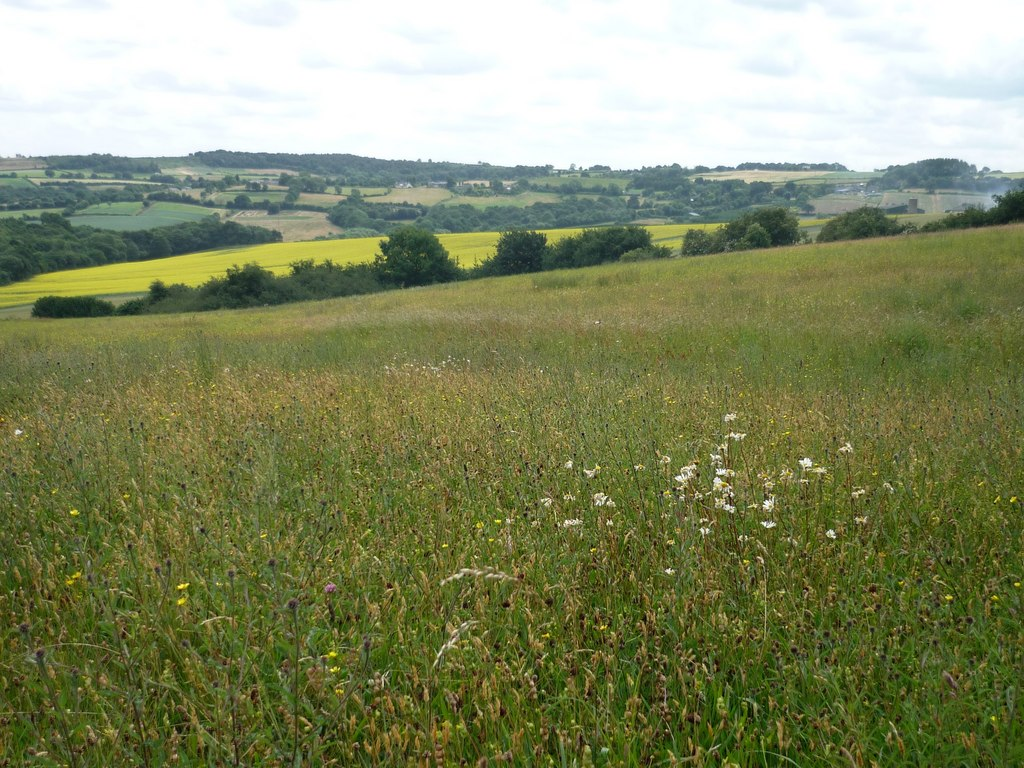
Hay meadow, Moss Valley, Derbyshire

Moss Valley Meadows is a Site of Special Scientific Interest (SSSI) in Derbyshire, England. It is located 4km south of Sheffield near Gleadless. This protected area is composed of three separate patches of land along a tributary to the valley of a stream called The Moss. This protected area includes patches of exceptional species-rich grassland.

== Biology ==
The three sections of this protected area are each north-facing slopes where there are species-rich grasslands. The two northern grassland patches are dry meadows where plant species include dyer's greenweed, betony, cowslip, lousewort, burnet-saxifrage and purging flax. The southernmost grassland is a wet meadow where there is marsh-marigold, lesser spearwort, southern marsh-orchid, ragged-robin, hoary ragwort and sneezewort. Hedges around these grassland areas include shrubs such as field maple, blackthorn and aspen. Wood anemone has been recorded within hedgerows.

The northernmost section of this protected area contains ancient woodland with tree species including ash, wych elm, cherry and rowan.

Insect species recorded in this protected area include the butterfly common blue and the hoverflies Xylota florum and Syrphus torvus.

== Geology ==
The rocks of the Moss Brook valley are shales and sandstones of the Lower Coal Measures.

== Land ownership ==
Part of Moss Valley Meadows SSSI is owned by the National Trust. Moss Valley Woodlands is owned by Sheffield City Council and managed by Sheffield and Rotherham Wildlife Trust.
