= Parwich Moor =

Protected area in Derbyshire, England

Coordinates: 53.117998°N 1.7414773°W

Parwich Moor is a Site of Special Scientific Interest (SSSI) in Peak District National Park in Derbyshire, England. It is located 3.5 km north of the village or Parwich. This area is protected because of the heathland present over a limestone substrate. The site has a series of hummocks and hollows.

== Biology ==
Plants on the hummocks include heather, bilberry, matgrass and heath bedstraw. Between the hummocks, plants are from a limestone grassland flora.

== Archaeology ==
An axe from the Bronze Age stored within the British Museum was found at Parwich Moor.
