= The Dungeon SSSI =

Geological Site of Special Scientific Interest near Heswall, Wirral, England

The Dungeon
- Site of Special Scientific Interest
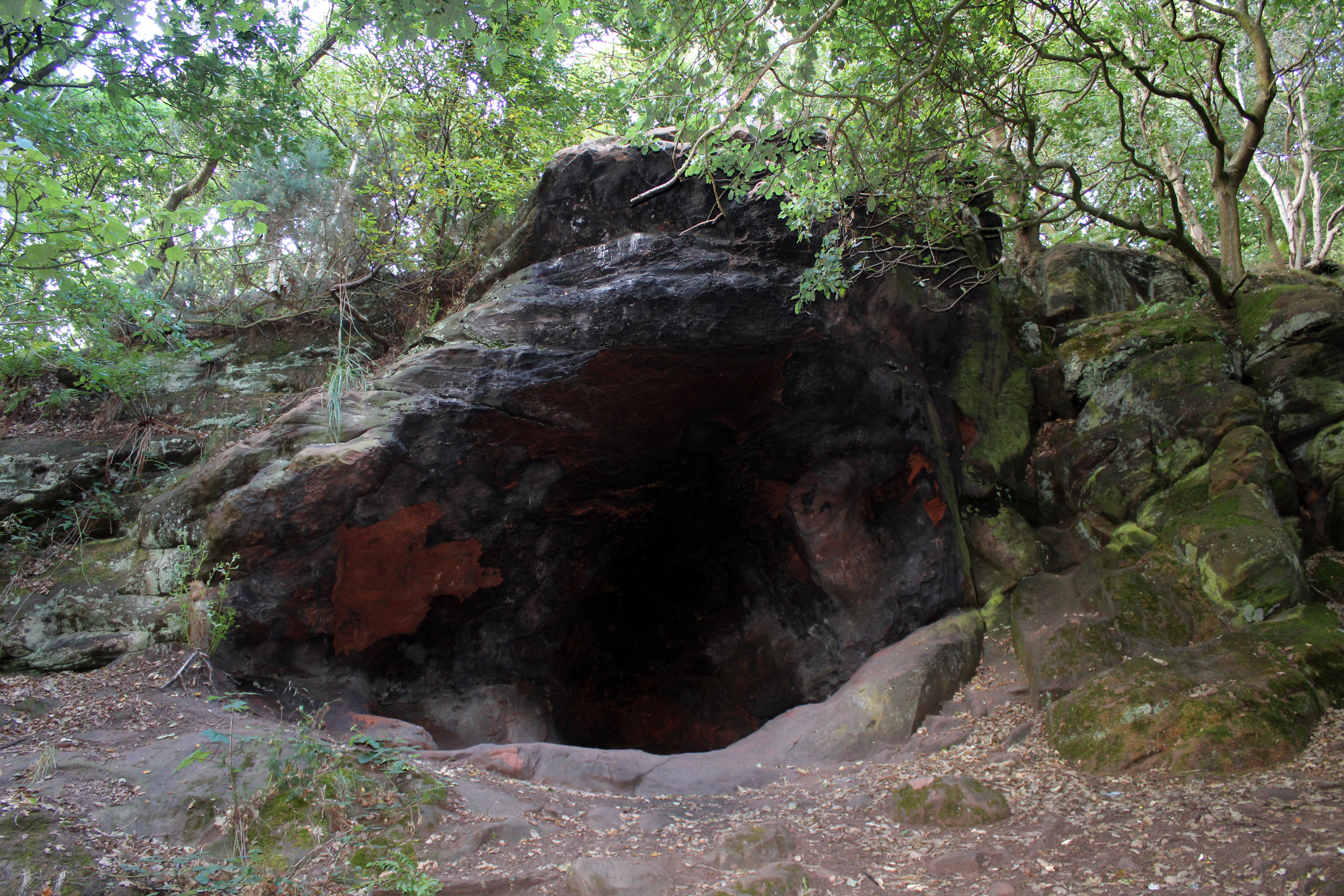

- Location within Merseyside
- Location of The Dungeon.
- Area of search: Merseyside
- Grid reference: SJ251831
- Coordinates: 53.336°N 3.106°W
- Interest: Geological
- Area: 1.2 ha (3.0 acres)
- Notification date: 1977 / 1987

The Dungeon is a 1.2-hectare (3.0-acre) Site of Special Scientific Interest (SSSI) situated 1 mile north-west of Heswall, on the Wirral Peninsula, England. The site was notified in 1988 due to its geological features which show the Tarporley Siltstone Formation of the Mercia Mudstone Group.
