= Hallam Barn Grasslands =

Protected area in Derbyshire, England

Coordinates: 53.346260°N 1.7175687°W

Hallam Barn Grasslands is a Site of Special Scientific Interest (SSSI) within Peak District National Park in Derbyshire, England. This protected area is located 800m east of Hope Railway Station. This site is on clay soil and is protected because of the diversity of grassland plant species.

== Biology ==
Plants in this grassland include meadow vetchling, common knapweed, meadow buttercup, bird’s-foot trefoil, ox-eye daisy, yellow rattle, tormentil and common spotted orchid. In wetter areas within the site, plant species include selfheal, ragged robin, great burnet, meadowsweet, lesser trefoil and wild angelica.
