= Lower Hollins =

Protected area in Derbyshire, England

Coordinates: 53.363507°N 1.8016056°W

Lower Hollins is a Site of Special Scientific Interest (SSSI) within Peak District National Park in Derbyshire, England. It is located 950m east of the village of Edale, within the Vale of Edale in the valley of the River Noe. Lower Hollins SSSI is protected because of the species rich grasslands that are managed as hay meadows.

== Biology ==
Plant species within the hay meadows include ox-eye daisy, yellow rattle, betony, devil's-bit scabious, autumn hawkbit, rough hawkbit, tormentil, common eyebright, common spotted orchid, common twayblade and greater butterfly orchid. In wetter areas, plant species include great burnet, ragged robin and meadowsweet.

Fungi in this protected area include the waxcap species: Hygrocybe calyptriformis, Hygrocybe punicea, Hygrocybe ingrata and Hygrocybe citrinovirens. A species of waxcap described for the first time in 2013 (Gliophorus reginae) has been recorded in this protected area.

== Geology ==
Rocks underlying this protected area include Namurian Edale Shales of the Millstone Grit series.
