= Red Scar and Tun Brook Woods =

Woodland in Lancashire, England

- Site of Special Scientific Interest
- Location within Lancashire
- Location of Red Scar and Tun Brook Woods.
- Area of search: Lancashire
- Grid reference: SD590324
- Coordinates: 53.786295°N 2.6237642°W
- Area: 157.89 acres (0.6390 km^{2}; 0.2467 sq mi)
- Notification date: 1986

Red Scar and Tun Brook Woods is a Site of Special Scientific Interest in the River Ribble valley near Elston, northeast of Preston, in Lancashire, England.

== Description ==
This protected area includes Boilton woods and Nab woods and is one of the largest areas of deciduous woodland in Lancashire. These woodlands are dominated by ash and wych elm. Woodland herbaceous plants include enchanter's nightshade and dog's mercury. Common bluebell is also present.

Insects present include white letter hairstreak butterfly (their caterpillars feed on wych elm leaves) and oak bush cricket.

The Wildlife Trust for Lancashire, Manchester & North Merseyside manages parts of this protected area.

Part of the land designated as Red Scar and Tun Brooks Woods SSSI is owned by the Church Commissioners.
