= Meols Meadows =

Site on the Wirral Peninsula, England

Meols Meadows is a 7.1 ha (18 acres) Site of Special Scientific Interest on the Wirral Peninsula, England. It is situated near to the town of Moreton and 8 km (5 mi) north west of Birkenhead. The site was notified in 1988 due to its biological features which is predominantly damp unimproved neutral grassland, and is the best example of this MG5 community in Merseyside and Greater Manchester.
