= Yarncliff Wood, Padley =

Protected area in England

Coordinates: 53°18′36″N 1°37′18″W

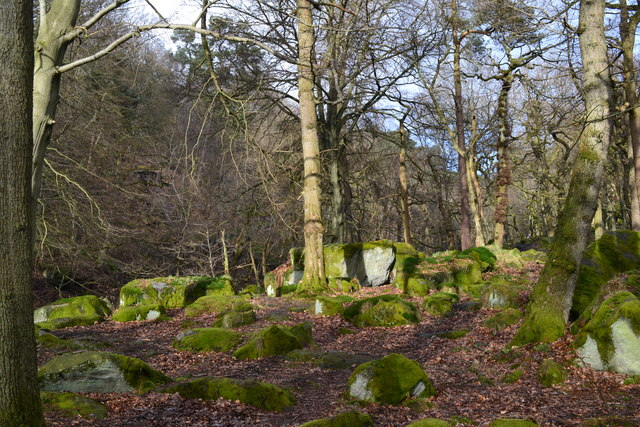
Yarncliff Wood

Yarncliff Wood, Padley is a Site of Special Scientific Interest (SSSI) within Peak District National Park in Derbyshire, England. It is located 200m from Nether Padley or 200m from Grindleford Railway Station. This protected area contains a woodland community that once covered much of the edges of upland areas of the Peak District, but is now largely restricted to steep sided valleys. This protected area includes a section of the valley of a stream called Burbage Brook encompassing Padley Gorge.

This site has historically had the name Padley Woods. This protected area borders the much larger protected area called Eastern Peak District Moors SSSI.

== Biology ==
Tree species in this woodland include sessile oak, silver birch, downy birch and alder. The understorey includes bilberry and heather. This protected area is important for lichen diversity and include species living on rocks that are from the genus Umbilicaria.

Bird species in this protected area include pied flycatcher, wood warbler and hawfinch.

== Land ownership ==
Most of the land within Yarncliff Wood, Padley SSSI is owned by the National Trust. Most of the land in this protected area is part of the Longshaw Estate, part of the larger National Trust Peak District Estate.
