= Maypole Colliery disaster =

1908 mining disaster that occurred in North-West England

Coordinates: 53.5096°N 2.5938°W

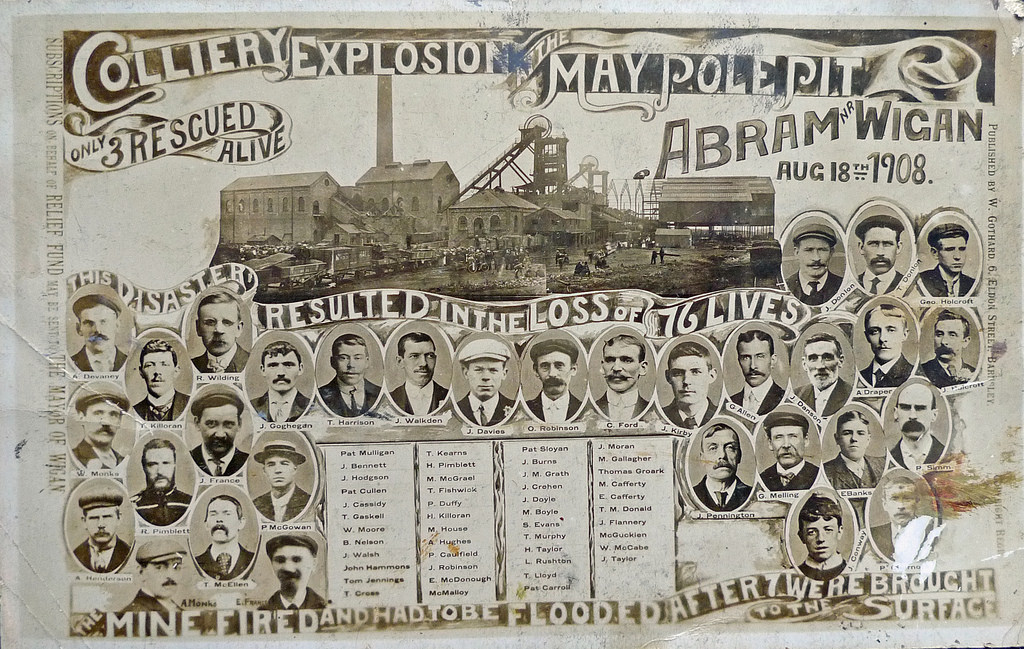
- Postcard published in 1908 to raise funds for the victims of the disaster
- Date: 18 August 1908
- Time: 17:10
- Location: Abram, Wigan, Lancashire, England
- Type: Coal mine disaster
- Cause: Explosion of firedamp
- Deaths: 75
- Burial: St John's Church, Abram

The Maypole Colliery disaster was a mining accident on 18 August 1908, when an underground explosion occurred at the Maypole Colliery, in Abram, near Wigan, then in the historic county of Lancashire, in North West England. The final death toll was 75.

== Background ==
The colliery was on the Lancashire Coalfield which contained numerous coal mines. Maypole Colliery was owned by the Pearson and Knowles Coal and Iron Company Ltd which had taken over the pit from the Moss Hall Coal Company in 1907. The miners were mainly drawn from the local area but also included a large number of workers who had moved to the area from County Mayo in Ireland.

== Explosion ==
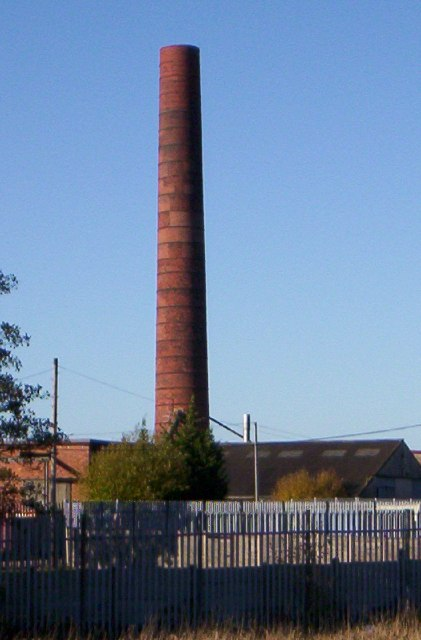
The chimney of Maypole Colliery in 2005

An explosion occurred just after 5 pm in No 1 Pit, shortly after the night shift began. Most of the men below ground at the time were shot-firers and maintenance workers. The explosion happened in the area known as the Four Feet mine. (Note: In this part of Lancashire a coal seam is referred to as a mine and the coal mine as a colliery or pit.) Colliery manager Arthur Rushton reported that when some distance away he heard a rumble and saw a cloud of dust rising from the pit shaft. The head gear was largely destroyed and the fan house, which provided ventilation, was badly damaged.

Rescue parties were organised immediately and led by the general manager John Knowles. After two days, attempts to locate survivors and recover bodies were abandoned when fire broke out underground. The pit was flooded to quell the fire. The last bodies were not recovered until 1917.

It was initially reported that 75 men had been working in the pit at the time. Three survivors were working in the Seven Feet mine, a different coal seam, not the Four Feet mine where the explosion occurred.

== Aftermath ==
King Edward VII sent a telegram expressing his sympathy towards those who suffered as a result of the disaster.

The inquests started three days after the explosion, but were adjourned as more bodies were recovered and were not completed until 8 July the following year. Accidental death verdicts were recorded on all 76 victims. The colliery owners argued that there had been no gas in the pit despite gas having been reported on the day before the explosion. The coroner concluded that the cause of death had been an explosion of firedamp and coal dust ignited by permitted explosives.

== Memorials ==
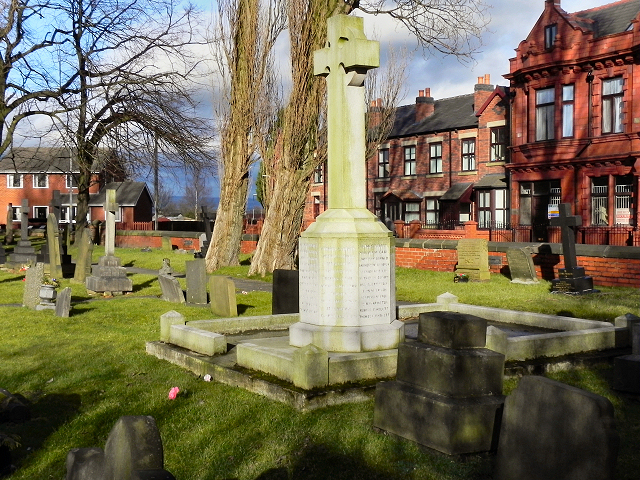
The Maypole memorial at St John the Evangelist's Church, Abram

Many of the victims of the disaster were buried at St John the Evangelist's Church, Abram. A memorial to the men who died was erected in the churchyard. The memorial was rededicated on the centenary of the disaster in 2008.

== See also ==
List of mining disasters in Lancashire
