= Abram, Greater Manchester =

Abram
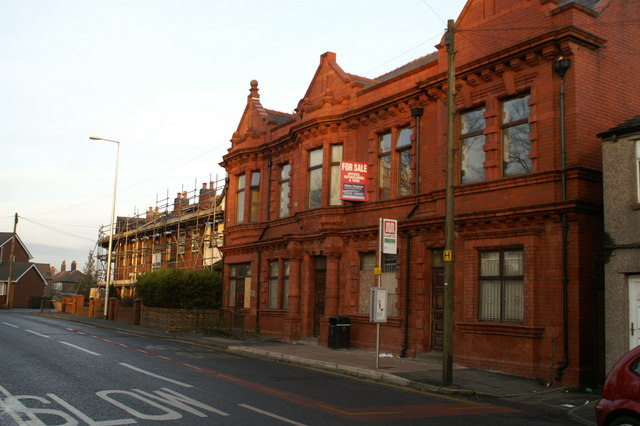
- Former Abram Council Offices

- Location within Greater Manchester
- Population: 9,855 (2001 Census)
- OS grid reference: SD609015
  - London: 173 mi (278 km) SE
- Metropolitan borough: Wigan
- Metropolitan county: Greater Manchester
- Region: North West
- Country: England
- Sovereign state: United Kingdom
- Post town: WIGAN
- Postcode district: WN2
- Dialling code: 01942
- Police: Greater Manchester
- Fire: Greater Manchester
- Ambulance: North West
- UK Parliament: Makerfield

Abram is a village and electoral ward in the Metropolitan Borough of Wigan, Greater Manchester, England. It lies on flat land on the northeast bank of the Leeds and Liverpool Canal, 2 miles (3.2 km) west of Leigh, 3 miles (4.8 km) southeast of Wigan, and 14.5 miles (23 km) west of Manchester. Abram is a dormitory village with a population of 9,855.

Historically part of Lancashire, Abram anciently formed a township and chapelry in the parish of Wigan and hundred of West Derby. Abram appears in an entry of an ancient survey of Lancashire in 1212 under the name "Edburgham".

The urbanisation and development of Abram largely coincided with the Industrial Revolution. Abram is at the centre of a coal district, and industrial scale coal mining was introduced to Abram around the middle of the 19th century with the opening of several collieries. In 1911, Abram was described as "distinctly unpicturesque ... trees are in the minority, and stunted and blackened with smoke", with "collieries, pit-banks, and railway lines" as well as "much pasture land". The Maypole Colliery Disaster in 1908 resulted in 75 deaths and profoundly changed the character of the village.

Abram's coal mining industry declined in the mid-20th century, but the village has continued to grow due to its position between Leigh, Manchester, Warrington and Wigan. To the south of the village lies Abram Flashes, a 39.6 hectares (97.9 acres) area of shallow wetlands and a Site of Special Scientific Interest. Abram has historic associations with traditional morris dancing.

== History ==
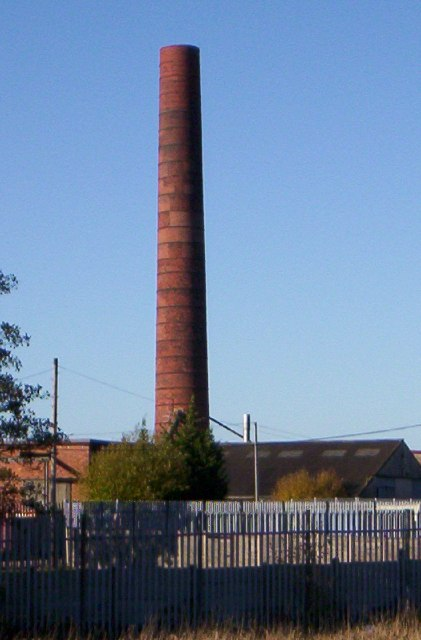
The chimney of Maypole Colliery where there was a mining accident in 1908, profoundly affecting the village.

The village name is recorded as Edburgham in 1212 and Adburgham in 1246. The form Abraham is found in the 16th century, and the current name of Abram in the 18th.

The manor was probably part of the larger manor of Newton until it was granted to "Warine son of Godfrey" by Henry II who reigned 1154–1189. The family adopted the name of the settlement, and remained Lords of the Manor until the 17th century. The family was ruined by the English Civil War, in which they supported the Royalists. When the last in male line of the Abraham family died in the 17th century, possession of the manor passed through many hands, and the title of Lord of the Manor was still around at the start of the 20th century although held no manorial rights.

Just after 17:00 on 18 August 1908 there was an explosion at the No 1, Cannell Mine of the Maypole Coal Pit. A total of 75 men and boys died in this mining accident. Because the explosion occurred deep underground, it was not until November 1909 that all the bodies were recovered. The inquest ruled that the explosion was caused by a combination of a buildup of coal dust and gas, and the use of explosives to bring down coal from the ceiling. The physical effects of the disaster on Abram are described as "profound"; the explosion made 44 women widows and killed the fathers of more than 120 children. At the time, Irish people were a large ethnic minority in Lancashire, making up between a quarter and a third of the populations of Leigh, St Helens, and Wigan. The Irish Catholic immigrants were seeking works on the Lancashire Coalfield, as demonstrated by the fact that 13 of the dead were Catholic migrants from Ireland. Many of the families affected by the disaster returned to Ireland shortly afterwards.

== Governance ==
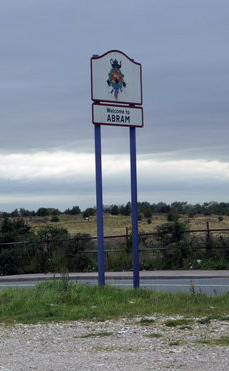
The welcome sign to Abram features a logo drawing upon the history and culture of the village.

Lying within the historic county boundaries of Lancashire since the early 12th century, Abram anciently constituted a manor, held by ruling families who paid tax to the King. Abram during the Middle Ages formed a township in the ecclesiastical parish of Wigan, and hundred of West Derby.

Following the Poor Law Amendment Act 1834, Abram formed part of the Wigan Poor Law Union, an inter-parish unit established to provide social security. Abram's first local authority was a Local board of health established in 1880; Abram Local Board of Health was a regulatory body responsible for standards of hygiene and sanitation in the township. Following the Local Government Act 1894, the area of the Local Board became the Abram Urban District, a local government district within the administrative county of Lancashire. The urban district council had 12 members and was based out of the Abram Council Offices, which were designed by Heaton, Ralph and Heaton and completed in 1903.

In 1957 there were exchanges of very small areas with Ashton in Makerfield and Golborne Urban Districts. Under the Local Government Act 1972, the Abram Urban District was abolished, and Abram has, since 1 April 1974, formed an unparished area of the Metropolitan Borough of Wigan, a local government district of the metropolitan county of Greater Manchester. Wigan Metropolitan Borough Council provides the local services.

In terms of parliamentary representation, Abram is part of the Makerfield constituency.

== Geography ==
At 53°30′29″N 2°35′17″W (53.508°,-2.588°) and 173 miles (278 km) northwest of central London, Abram lies on mostly flat ground, with slightly undulating land at its southern end. The larger towns of Wigan and Leigh lie to the northwest and east respectively. For purposes of the Office for National Statistics, Abram forms part of the Wigan Urban Area. Suburban localities in and around Abram include Bamfurlong, Bickershaw, Bryn Gates and Platt Bridge.

The land around Abram is generally flat and used for coal mining and arable farming. As a result, collieries were scattered across the landscape. The local geology consists of coal measures in the north and sandstone in the south; the soil is clayey and as a result, the area is susceptible to flooding.

To the south of the village lies Abram Flashes a 39.6-hectare (97.9-acre) Site of Special Scientific Interest (SSSI). The site lies adjacent to the Leigh Branch Canal and is part of Wigan Flashes an area of wetland stretching for 6.2 miles (10 km) between Wigan and Leigh. The flashes are shallow bodies of water that originate from flooding due to the subsidence caused by shallow mining. Abram flashes was designated an SSSI in 1990 due to its biological interest which includes various habitats such as open water, swamp, tall herb fen and wet marshy grassland.

== Demography ==
Abram ethnicity compared
2001 UK census	Abram	Wigan (borough)	England
Total population	9,855	301,415	49,138,831
White	98.3%	98.7%	90.9%
Asian	0.7%	0.4%	4.6%
Black	0.2%	0.2%	2.3%

According to the Office for National Statistics, at the time of the United Kingdom Census 2001, Abram had a population of 9,855. The 2001 population density was 14,258 inhabitants per square mile (5,505/km^{2}), with a 100 to 99.7 female-to-male ratio. Of those over 16 years old, 30.3% were single (never married) and 43.2% married. Abram's 4,037 households included 27.2% one-person, 40.0% married couples living together, 9.5% were co-habiting couples, and 12.5% single parents with their children. Of those aged 16–74, 42.2% had no academic qualifications.

At the 2001 UK census, 84.7% of Abram's residents reported themselves as being Christian, 0.9% Muslim, 0.2% Buddhist and 0.1% Sikh. The census recorded 6.5% as having no religion, 0.1% had an alternative religion and 7.5% did not state their religion.

Population growth in Abram since 1901
Year	1901	1911	1921	1931	1939	1951	1961	1971	1981	1991	2001
Population	6,306	6,893	6,853	6,660	5,761	6,284	6,004	6,475	12,423	11,428	9,855
Urban District 1901–1971 • Urban Subdivision 1981–2001

== Landmarks ==
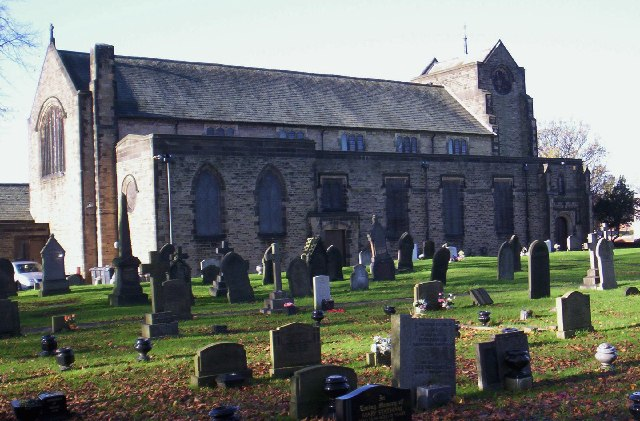
St John's Church in Abram was constructed 1935–37, and is one of the works by Austin and Paley.

The parish church of St John in Abram was constructed in 1935–1937, and is one of the works by Austin and Paley. There are two listed buildings in the village, both of which are Grade II; they are Brookside farmhouse, dating from the early-18th century, and a mid-18th century detached house on Warrington Road.

== Transport ==
Public transport in Abram is co-ordinated by Transport for Greater Manchester. A roads link Abram with other settlements, including the A573 road which bisects the town from north to south, and connects it to Wigan and Golborne. The M6 motorway runs to the southwest of the area, near Ashton in Makerfield, and is accessed via the A58 at junction 24 of the M6.

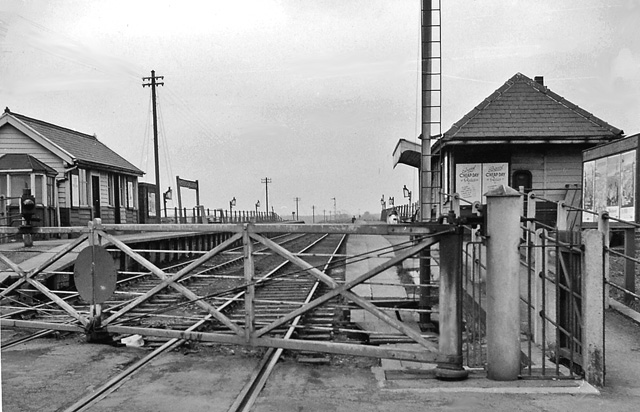
Bickershaw & Abram Station in 1962

Bickershaw and Abram railway station was a station on the now closed Wigan Central to Glazebrook line. It opened along with six other stations on 1 April 1884. It closed on 2 November 1964.

There are frequent buses running through Abram with services to a variety of destinations in Greater Manchester, including services to Wigan, Leigh and Manchester.

The Leeds and Liverpool Canal passes Abram to the southwest.

== Culture and community ==
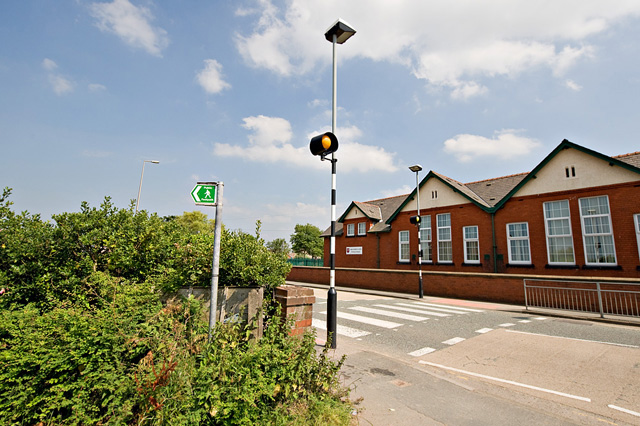
Abram Bryn Gates Primary School is one of two primary schools in the village. It lies in the Bryn Gates area of Abram.

The village has historic associations with traditional Morris dancing and is home to Abram Morris Dancers. A plot of land by Park Lane in the southwest of Abram is known as the Morris Dancers' ground, and is popularly supposed to be held by the Abram Morris Dancers on condition that a Morris dance be celebrated there once every 20 years. The Abram Circle is a dance native to Abram and is "renowned to morris dancers". The Abram Morris Dancers' logo appears on the boundary signs for the village.

Abram has one main primary school: St John's Church of England Primary School.

== Notable people ==
John Elisha Grimshaw was an Abram-born recipient of the Victoria Cross, the highest military decoration awarded for valour "in the face of the enemy" to members of the British and Commonwealth forces.

Jenny Meadows is a British athlete. She attended Abram C of E Primary School on Simpkin Street and still lives in Abram today. Her main event is the 800 m, where she was European Indoor Champion in 2011.

Mick Burke was a well-known mountaineer and rescuer who lived in Abram. He lost his life on Mount Everest in 1975 whilst working as a cameraman for the BBC.

== See also ==
- Listed buildings in Abram, Greater Manchester
- List of mining disasters in Lancashire
