= Castleton SSSI, Derbyshire =

Protected area in Derbyshire, England

Castleton SSSI
- Site of Special Scientific Interest
- Location within Derbyshire
- Location of Castleton SSSI.
- Area of search: Derbyshire
- Grid reference: SK120820
- Coordinates: 53.334775°N 1.8212606°W
- Area: 2,035.9 acres (8.239 km^{2}; 3.181 sq mi)
- Notification date: 1987

Castleton is a Site of Special Scientific Interest (SSSI) in Derbyshire, England within Peak District National Park. It is located between Castleton and Sparrowpit, close to Edale and borders Mam Tor hill. This protected area includes Winnats Pass.

== Geology ==
Castleton SSSI marks the northernmost extent of carboniferous limestone within the Peak District. Underground, the area has important cave systems, including Eldon Hole, located near Eldon Hill. The karst drainage systems connected to this protected area include Peak Cavern, Treak Cliff Cavern and Speedwell Cavern.

== Biology ==
The site has important species-rich limestone grasslands and rock-ledge plant communities. Polemonium caeruleum and Geranium lucidum have been recorded in rock ledge communities around Winnats Pass.

== Land ownership ==
Landowners within the area designated as Castleton SSSI include the Duchy of Lancaster and the Diocese of Derby (via its Diocesan Board of Finance).
