= Dovedale Wood =

Woodland in England

Coordinates: 53°09′47″N 1°18′18″W

Dovedale Wood is a Site of Special Scientific Interest (SSSI) that contains land in both Derbyshire and Nottinghamshire in England. It is located within the estate of Hardwick Hall, 8km northwest of Mansfield. This protected area contains exceptional ancient woodland.

== Biology ==
The ancient woodland is dominated by two tree species: ash and wych-elm. There is also a patch of alder trees. The woodland contains herbaceous species including herb paris. The herb golden saxifrage is found in wet flushes within this protected area.

== Geology ==
The wood is situated on south-west facing slopes and terraces shaped by Carboniferous Middle Coal Measures. The soils on top of these rock layers probably receive base enrichment from strata of the Permian Lower Magnesian Limestone higher up the slope.

== Land ownership ==
All land within Dovedale Wood SSSI is owned by the National Trust as it is situated within the estate of Hardwick Hall.
