= Beti Rhys =

Welsh bookseller and author (1907–2003)

- Born: 2 April 1907; Port Talbot, Glamorgan, Wales
- Died: 5 April 2003 (aged 96); Cardiff, Wales
- Occupations: Bookseller, author
- Years active: 1950–1994

Beti Rhys (2 April 1907 – 5 April 2003) was a Welsh bookseller and author who promoted literature in the Welsh language in South Wales in the 1950s and 1960s. Educated at the Howell's School, Llandaff, where a policy was enacted to bar anyone from speaking Welsh, she began her career teaching the language in schools. In 1950 Rhys began a bookshop specialising in books in Welsh and university textbooks in Cardiff. The shop was successful academically, financially and socially and attracted many notable Welsh individuals. After retiring in 1968, she travelled the world, wrote two books on the subject and a biography on Evan Rees, the Archdruid of Wales.

== Biography ==
Beti Rhys was born on 2 April 1907 in Port Talbot, Glamorgan. She was the daughter of J.E. Rhys, a Presbyterian minister, and his wife. Rhys had one sister, Neilan. She was educated at the Howell's School, Llandaff, which she resented due to its policy of barring any person from speaking the Welsh language; Rhys was described by one member of staff as "dirty Welsh". The experience failed to dissuade her and she went on to read Welsh at University College, Cardiff (now Cardiff University). Rhys began her career teaching Welsh at multiple schools before settling at the Pentre Secondary School in the Rhondda, after which she was employed as senior Welsh teacher at Colwyn Bay Grammar School in October 1947.

In 1950 Rhys borrowed money from friends of hers to begin a bookshop called the University Bookshop specialising in books published in the Welsh language and university textbooks at the Castle Arcade shopping building in Cardiff. During that era, books published in the Welsh language were scarce with a close following and the opening of her shop expanded their reach further south in Wales. According to Rhys' obituarist in The Times, the shop became "a focal point for the Welsh literati". Soon after its opening she obtained contracts to deliver textbooks to various Welsh educational institutions. Rhys had regular customers in Idris Foster, the professor of Celtic Studies at Jesus College, Oxford, the poets Waldo Williams and Dylan Thomas, Saunders Lewis, the co-founder of the political party Plaid Cymru, the historian John Davies, the politician Neil Kinnock and his wife Glenys Parry.

The shop made an academic, financial and social success, and she soon opened a second shop in Park Place, Cardiff, which her sister managed. Rhys also advised students who struggled academically. A doctor from Kuwait held a positive review of her swift service, and he persuaded his hospital in his home country to order all of its works from her store. She sold her shops in 1968, so that she could retire to Aberystwyth in West Wales and travel.

Rhys traveled to China via a cargo boat, the Trans-Siberian Railway to reach Russia, a bus to India, visited the Americas by the Greyhound Lines, and all of Africa. She wrote two books about her travels, Crwydro'r Byd (Travelling the World), and I'r India a thu hwnt (To India and Beyond) in 1995. Rhys wrote a biography about her great-uncle, Evan Rees, the Archdruid of Wales from 1905 to 1923. She later returned to Cardiff, and went into a nursing home. She died on 5 April 2003.

== Personality ==
Rhys was described by her obituarist in The Times as a "Champion of Welsh" and an "indomitable Welsh woman".

== Bibliography ==
- Rhys, Beti (1984). Dyfed: Bywyd a gwaith Evan Rees (1850–1923) [Dyfed: The Life and Work of Evan Rees (1850-1923)] (in Welsh). Gwasg Gee. ISBN 978-0-7074-0109-6.
- Rhys, Beti (1988). Crwydro'r byd [Travelling the World] (in Welsh). Gwasg Gee. ISBN 978-0-7074-0157-7.
- Rhys, Beti (1994). I'r India a Thu Hwnt [To India and Beyond] (in Welsh). Gwasg Gee. ISBN 978-0-7074-0253-6.
