= Downholland Moss =

UK protected area

Downholland Moss SSSI
- Site of Special Scientific Interest
- Location within Lancashire
- Location of Downholland Moss SSSI.
- Area of search: Lancashire
- Grid reference: SD327079
- Coordinates: 53.567834°N 3.0221956°W
- Area: 52.4 acres (0.2121 km^{2}; 0.08187 sq mi)
- Notification date: 1990

Downholland Moss is a Site of Special Scientific Interest, notified in 1990. It is located near the town of Formby in Lancashire, England. Geological deposits at the site have been used to reconstruct palaeoenvironments and past sea-level change.

Downholland Moss was one of several raised mires in Lancashire formed where glacial deposits allowed raised bogs to develop.

Part of the land area designated as Downholland Moss Site of Special Scientific Interest is owned by the Church Commissioners
