= Fram Farrington =

Antarctic explorer

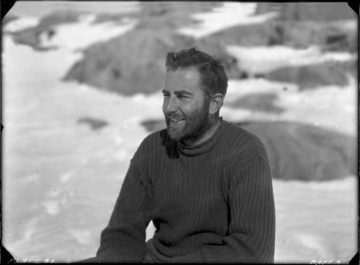
Farrington, November 1944

James Edward Butler Futtit Farrington (6 April 1908 – 4 October 2002) (originally called Butler; later known universally as Fram) was a key member of Operation Tabarin, a secret wartime Antarctic expeditionary force, and the last surviving holder of the Polar Medal in Bronze, abolished after 1941.

== Early life ==
Farrington was born on 6 April 1908, in Dunmurry, Northern Ireland. He qualified as a marine radio operator in 1929 and joined the Merchant Navy where he served for the next six years.

== First visits to polar regions ==
After serving on P&O liners and cargo ships he began his Antarctic career as part of the Discovery Committee, voyaging south to the coasts of Enderby Land, Kemp Land and Mac. Robertson Land. Between 1937 and 1938, he served with future Operation Tabarin leader James Marr aboard HMS William Scoresby. In addition to his radio duties Farrington took charge of producing the ship's journal Pelagic News. As a ship-based member Farringdon received the Bronze Polar Medal, a distinction which always rankled with him.

== Wartime service ==
After the outbreak of war, Farrington became an Air Ministry inspector based at Metropolitan-Vickers in Manchester, until he was summoned to London for secondment to Operation Tabarin, under the overall command of Lt-Cdr James Marr. Based on Deception Island, in the South Shetlands, Farrington had expected to spend the winter of 1945–46 at Hope Bay, but his sense of duty made him exchange places with a less experienced radio operator. Thus, technically, he never wintered on the Antarctic mainland, with the result that he was not awarded the Silver Polar Medal

== Post war ==
On his return from the Antarctic in 1946, Farrington became a scientific officer with the Telecommunications Research Establishment at Malvern, moving two years later to the new electronics division at the Atomic Energy Research Establishment, Harwell. He retired in 1975 and returned to Northern Ireland in 1989, where he died on 4 October 2002, survived by his wife and son.

== Bibliography ==
- Thurston, Michael H. (1974). Crustacea Amphipoda from Graham Land and the Scotia arc, collected by Operation Tabarin and the Falkland Islands Dependencies Survey, 1944-59. London: British Antarctic Survey. ISBN 0856650242.
