= St John the Evangelist's Church, Abram =

Church in Wigan, England

Coordinates: 53.5096°N 2.5938°W

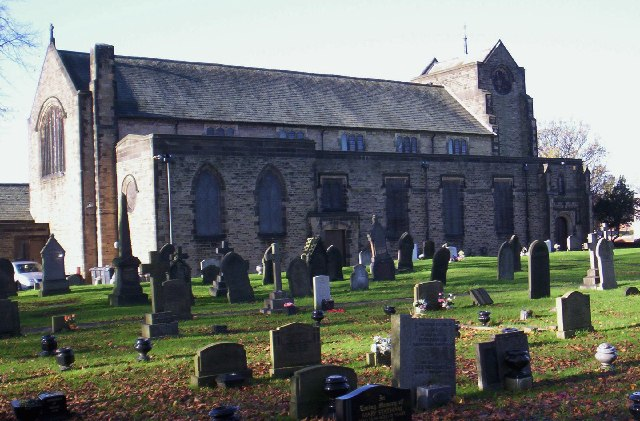
St John the Evangelist's Church, Abram

St John the Evangelist's Church is on Warrington Road in Abram, Wigan, Greater Manchester, England. It is an active Church of England parish church in the deanery of Wigan, the archdeaconry of Warrington, and the diocese of Liverpool. The church was built in 1935–37 to replace an older church built in 1838 that had been damaged by mining subsidence.

== History ==
It was designed by the Lancaster architect Henry Paley of Austin and Paley, and built at a cost of £11,113 (equivalent to £910,000 in 2023), providing seating for 478 people. The foundation stone of the original building was laid on 9 March 1836 by Sir Henry Gunning, and it was consecrated on 9 June 1838 by the Bishop of Chester. Over time, the church had become damaged by mining subsidence to the point where in 1907, the church's bell turret on the tower collapsed. A new tower re-enforced with metal was built to replace it but it started discussions on the need to replace the church.

Work on a new church did not start until 1935 due to the cost. In 1936, a public subscription in honour of the Silver Jubilee of George V allowed for a clock to be installed in the new tower. The new St John the Evangelist's was consecrated in 1937. The present church is constructed in stone from Darley Dale, and has a short squat west tower with a saddleback roof. The stained glass in the west window, and two of the wall monuments in the church were moved from the old church. The two-manual pipe organ was made by Richardson and Sons, and was also moved from the old church. The churchyard contains the war graves of seven soldiers of World War I, and three soldiers and two airmen of World War II. In 2023, the Diocese of Liverpool named St John the Evangelist's Church as a possible one of nineteen churches that could be closed in order to save money on maintenance within the diocese.

== See also ==
- List of churches in Greater Manchester
- List of ecclesiastical works by Austin and Paley (1916–44)
