= Trench Meadows =

Protected area in West Yorkshire, England

Coordinates: 53.8450°N 1.8025°W

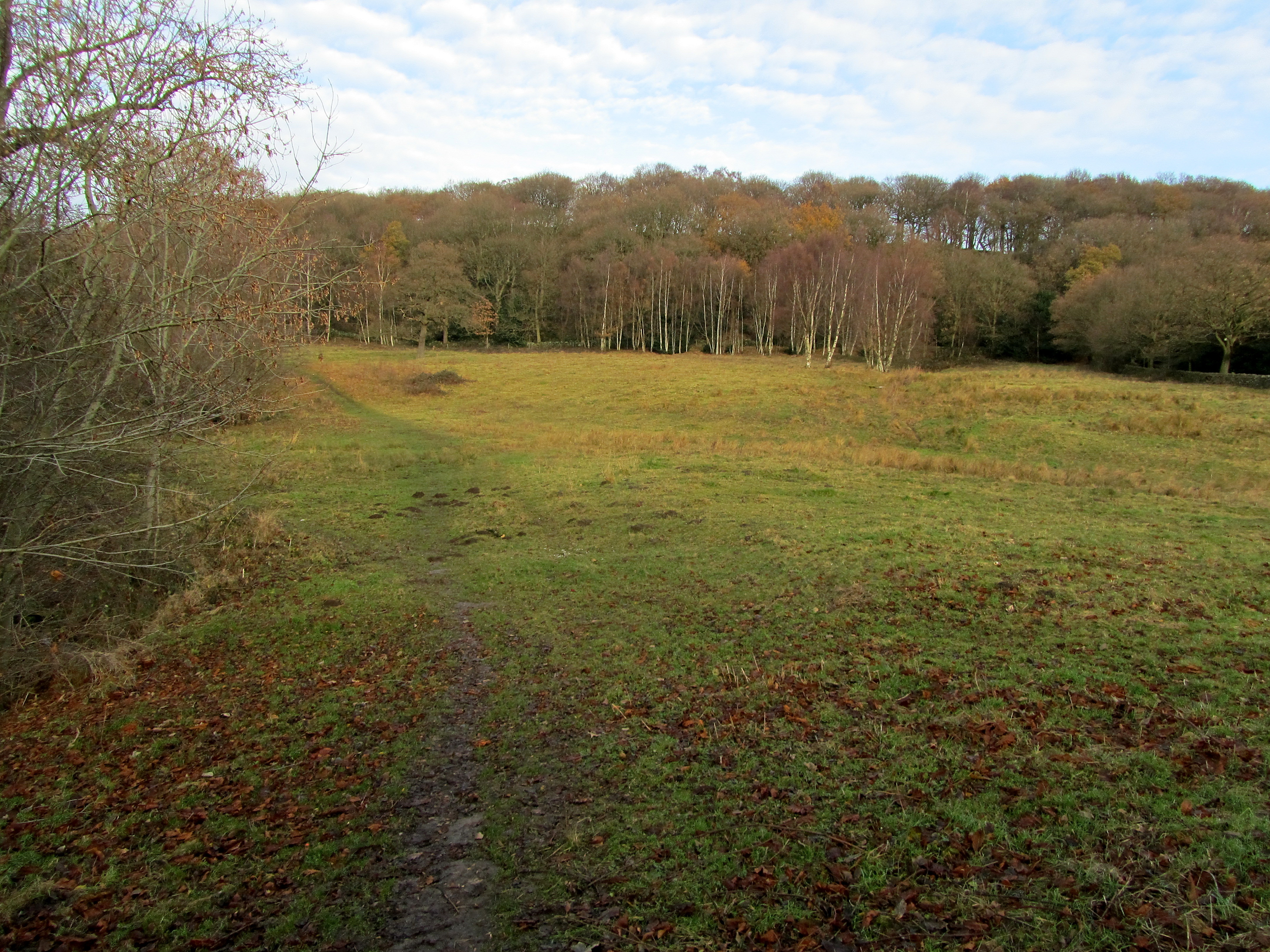
Trench Meadows

Trench Meadows is a Site of Special Scientific Interest (SSSI) in West Yorkshire, England. This protected area is located 1km northwest of the village of Saltaire. These meadows are protected because this neutral grassland has a high diversity of plant species. The southwestern boundary of this protected area follows a stream called Loadpit Beck, that flows into the River Aire.

Trench Meadows SSSI is within the Bradford Pennine Gateway National Nature Reserve.

== Biology ==
Plant species in the neutral grasslands of Trench Meadows include black knapweed, bird's-foot-trefoil, heath grass, devil's-bit scabious, tormentil and betony. In areas of acid grassland plant species include heath bedstraw, marsh bedstraw, lesser spearwort, meadowsweet and marsh marigold.

== Geology ==
Trench Meadows SSSI lies on boulder clay that sits on top of Millstone Grit.

== Land ownership and management ==
All land within Trench Meadows SSSI is owned by the local authority. Trench Meadows SSSI is owned by the City of Bradford Metropolitan District Council. Management of this protected area is delivered by the council and is supported by the Aire Rivers Trust (a charity that supports teams of volunteers to improve the environment of the River Aire).

Most of the land within Bradford Pennine Gateway National Nature Reserve is owned and managed by City of Bradford Metropolitan District Council.
