= Ludworth Intake =

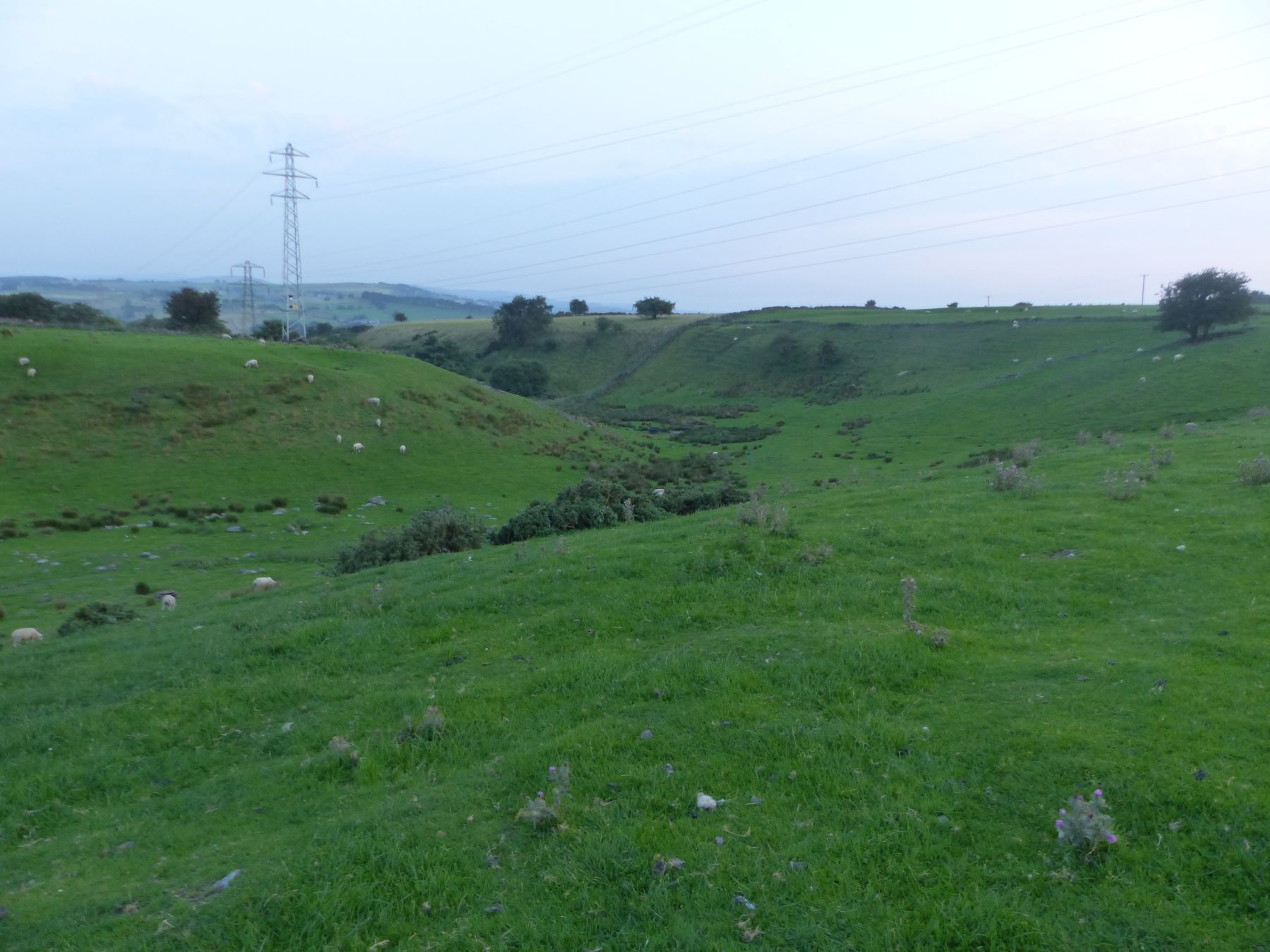
- Ludworth Intake from a public footpath to the west

- Location within the United Kingdom
- Location: Greater Manchester, North West, England; Derbyshire, East Midlands, England
- Nearest town: Ludworth
- Coordinates: 53°25′1″N 2°0′30″W
- Area: 5.1 ha (13 acres)
- Established: 1998
- Governing body: Natural England
- Website: Map of site

Ludworth Intake (grid reference SJ994911) is a 5.1-hectare (13-acre) geological Site of Special Scientific Interest at Ludworth on the border of Derbyshire and Greater Manchester, England. It was notified in 1998 for its geological interest.

The site, north-east of Marple Bridge and south of Chisworth, comprises a sinuous dry valley running for about 400 metres (1,300 ft) south from Intakes Farm, cutting through a broad ridge running east–west. It is considered to have been formed by a meltwater stream running beside or below a glacier. Pollen analyses from the site show that the channel dates from before the Younger Dryas (around 12,900 to 11,700 years BP). It has been described as "an exceptional and nationally important example of an isolated col channel cut by glacial meltwater" and as having "considerable potential for further study". A public road, Sandhill Lane, runs parallel to the eastern side of the valley and cuts across its southern end near the former Ludworth Moor Colliery, which ceased operation in the early 1980s.
