= Platt Bridge =

Coordinates: 53.5237°N 2.598°W

- Location within Greater Manchester
- OS grid reference: SD604031
- Metropolitan borough: Wigan
- Metropolitan county: Greater Manchester
- Region: North West
- Country: England
- Sovereign state: United Kingdom
- Post town: WIGAN
- Postcode district: WN2
- Dialling code: 01942
- Police: Greater Manchester
- Fire: Greater Manchester
- Ambulance: North West
- UK Parliament: Makerfield

Platt Bridge is a settlement in the Metropolitan Borough of Wigan, Greater Manchester, England, 2 miles (3.2 km) south of Wigan town centre along the spine of the A573 road. Historically part of the Hindley Urban District, in Lancashire, the area is now a residential suburb of Wigan. The first mention of Platt Bridge in documents occurs in 1599. The name comes from "plat" or "platte" meaning a foot-bridge.

Platt Bridge borders Abram, Bamfurlong, Hindley and Ince-in-Makerfield. Platt Bridge's border with Bamfurlong is marked by a brook which runs under the A58 and is shown by an ancient marker stone.

Two railways pass through Platt Bridge; one, the West Coast Main Line, the other a disused industrial line. Platt Bridge had a railway station on the Manchester and Wigan Railway line that closed in 1969.

Two schools in Platt Bridge, Low Hall County Primary School and Saint Nathaniel's C.E. Primary were closed and amalgamated into a new school Platt Bridge Community School, designed by NPS and opened in November 2006. It is a modern 'state-of-the-art' extended school. In addition, there is a Sure Start children's centre, a family centre and a children's and adults' public library. On the site, there is a primary care trust health facility and a housing office.

There are four churches in the area: the parish church St Nathaniel's (Church of England), built in 1905; Holy Family & St Wilfrid (Roman Catholic); an Independent Methodist Chapel (Methodist); and a Church of Christ (Churches of Christ).

On 31 May 2012, the Olympic Torch procession passed through Platt Bridge en route from Stoke-on-Trent to Bolton.

== Site of Special Scientific Interest ==
Bryn Marsh & Ince Moss is a Site of Special Scientific Interest (SSSI) to the east of Platt Bridge. The 168.8 acre (68.3 hectare) site was designated in 1989 for its biological interest. The main habitats are open water, fen and swamp, mire, woodland, acidic and neutral grassland and ruderal communities. The site is important for its breeding bird populations including: little grebe, great crested grebe, mute swan, tufted duck, common snipe and common redshank. Ten species of dragonfly and damselfly are also found, some of which are locally rare.

All land within Bryn Marsh & Ince Moss SSSI is owned by the local authority.
