= List of Sites of Special Scientific Interest in the East Riding of Yorkshire =

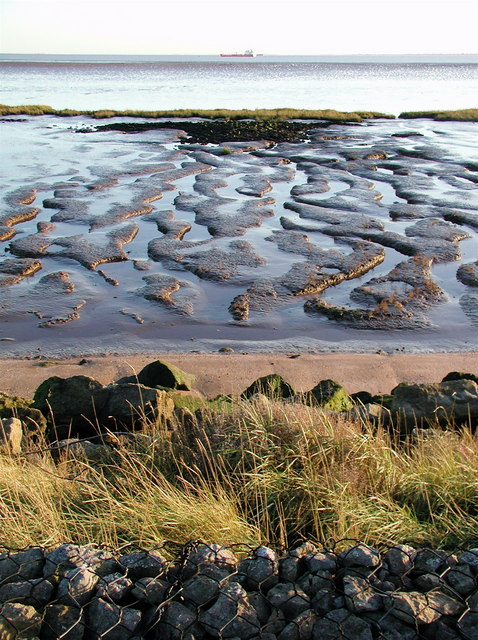
View of the Humber Estuary, the largest SSSI in the area, across the western end of Sunk Island Sands

This is a list of the Sites of Special Scientific Interest (SSSIs) in the East Riding of Yorkshire, England. In England the body responsible for designating SSSIs is Natural England, which chooses a site because of its fauna, flora, geological or physiographical features. As of 2020, there are 50 sites designated in this Area of Search, of which 39 have been designated due to their biological interest, 14 due to their geological interest, and 3 for both.

Natural England took over the role of designating and managing SSSIs from English Nature in October 2006 when it was formed from the amalgamation of English Nature, parts of the Countryside Agency and the Rural Development Service. There are two unitary authorities in the Area of Search: Kingston upon Hull and East Riding of Yorkshire.

For other counties, see List of Sites of Special Scientific Interest by Area of Search.

== Sites ==
| Site name | Reason for designation | | Area | | Coordinates & Grid ref^{[A]} | Year in which notified | Other designations | Map^{[B]} & Citation |
| Site name | Biological interest | Geological interest | Hectares | Acres | Coordinates & Grid ref^{[A]} | Year in which notified | Other designations | Map^{[B]} & Citation |
|---|---|---|---|---|---|---|---|---|
| Allerthorpe Common | ✓ | | 12.8 | 31.7 | 53.917°N 0.843°W; SE761474 | 1951 | WT | Map |
| Barn Hill Meadows | ✓ | | 8.6 | 21.3 | 53.748°N 0.89°W; SE733285 | 1987 | | Map |
| Beckhead Plantation | ✓ | | 3.7 | 9.1 | 53.972°N 0.757°W; SE816536 | 1968 | WT | Map |
| Bishop Wilton Deep Dale | ✓ | | 43.4 | 107.3 | 53.994°N 0.755°W; SE817560 | 1954 | | Map |
| Bishop Wilton Poor Land | ✓ | | 2.1 | 5.1 | 53.991°N 0.815°W; SE778557 | 1988 | | Map |
| Breighton Meadows | ✓ | | 37.4 | 90.6 | SE704330 | 1986 | | Map |
| Boynton Willow Garth | | ✓ | 5.1 | 12.7 | 54.091°N 0.28°W; TA126675 | 1984 | GCR | Map |
| Brantingham Dale | ✓ | | 15.8 | 39 | 53.768°N 0.563°W; SE948311 | 1986 | | Map |
| Bryan Mills Field | ✓ | | 1.3 | 3.2 | 53.901°N 0.46°W; TA013461 | 1986 | | Map |
| Burton Bushes | ✓ | | 11.4 | 28.1 | 53.84°N 0.467°W; TA010393 | 1968 | | Map |
| Cinquefoil Brow and Wood Dale | ✓ | | 11.5 | 28.5 | 54.065°N 0.539°W; SE957642 | 1989 | | Map |
| Cottam Well Dale | ✓ | | 23.9 | 59 | 54.061°N 0.51°W; SE976638 | 1985 | | Map |
| Derwent Ings | ✓ | | 667.7 | 1650 | 53.883°N 0.934°W; SE702435 | 1975 | SPA, WT, NNR, NP, NCR, Ramsar site, SAC | Map |
| Dimlington Cliff | | ✓ | 34.2 | 84.4 | 53.675°N 0.101°E; TA389219 | 1990 | GCR | Map |
| Drewton Lane Pits | | ✓ | 5.2 | 12.8 | 53.783°N 0.605°W; SE920328 | 1988 | GCR | Map |
| Enthorpe Railway Cutting | | ✓ | 3.4 | 8.4 | 53.9°N 0.617°W; SE910458 | 1981 | GCR | Map |
| Everthorpe Quarry | | ✓ | 3.7 | 9.1 | 53.779°N 0.613°W; SE915323 | 1959 | GCR | Map |
| Flamborough Head | ✓ | ✓ | 326.9 | 807.8 | 54.13°N 0.115°W; TA233721 | 1952 | SPA, GCR, LNR, NCR, RSPB, SAC | Map |
| Flamborough Railway Cutting | ✓ | | 1.6 | 4 | 54.118°N 0.175°W; TA194707 | 1986 | | Map |
| Fordon Chalk Grasslands | ✓ | | 55.7 | 137.6 | 54.169°N 0.408°W; TA040760 | 1975 | WT, NCR | Map |
| Hoddy Cows Spring | ✓ | | 2 | 4.9 | 54.146°N 0.193°W; TA181737 | 1984 | | Map |
| Hornsea Mere | ✓ | | 232.3 | 573.9 | 53.903°N 0.192°W; TA189467 | 1951 | SPA, NCR, RSPB | Map |
| Horse Dale and Holm Dale | ✓ | | 43.8 | 108.2 | 54°N 0.667°W; SE875568 | 1985 | | Map |
| Hotham Meadow | ✓ | | 1.8 | 4.4 | 53.804°N 0.641°W; SE896351 | 1989 | | Map |
| Humber Estuary | ✓ | ✓ | 37000.6 | 91430.5 | 53.578°N 0.03°E; TA345110 | 2004 | SPA, GCR, MOD, NNR, Ramsar site, SAC | Map |
| Keasey Dale | ✓ | | 3.6 | 9 | 53.973°N 0.671°W; SE873538 | 1989 | | Map |
| Kelsey Hill Gravel Pits | | ✓ | 10.6 | 26.1 | 53.72°N 0.125°W; TA238265 | 1952 | GCR | Map |
| Kiplingcotes Chalk Pit | ✓ | | 4 | 10 | 53.879°N 0.611°W; SE914434 | 1968 | LNR, WT | Map |
| Lambwath Meadows | ✓ | | 29.6 | 73.1 | 53.839°N 0.16°W; TA212396 | 1989 | | Map |
| Leven Canal | ✓ | | 21.3 | 52.6 | 53.889°N 0.351°W; TA085449 | 1962 | | Map |
| Melbourne and Thornton Ings | ✓ | | 200 | 494.3 | 53.899°N 0.883°W; SE735453 | 1985 | SPA, NCR, Ramsar site, SAC | Map |
| Melton Bottom Chalk Pit | | ✓ | 87.2 | 215.5 | 53.73°N 0.534°W; SE968270 | 1968 | GCR | Map |
| Millington Wood and Pastures | | ✓ | 343.5 | 848.9 | 53.98°N 0.695°W; SE857546 | 1954 | GCR | Map |
| Newbald Becksies | ✓ | | 1.9 | 4.8 | 53.822°N 0.607°W; SE918371 | 1990 | | Map |
| Newton Mask | ✓ | | 17.6 | 43.5 | 53.942°N 0.926°W; SE706501 | 1986 | SPA, NCR, Ramsar site, SAC | Map |
| Pocklington Canal | ✓ | | 21.4 | 53 | 53.901°N 0.804°W; SE787456 | 1987 | | Map |
| Pulfin Bog | ✓ | | 17.1 | 42.1 | 53.882°N 0.406°W; TA049440 | 1954 | WT | Map |
| Rifle Butts Quarry | ✓ | ✓ | 0.3 | 0.8 | 53.872°N 0.636°W; SE898426 | 1952 | GCR, WT | Map |
| River Derwent^{[C]} | ✓ | | 408.3^{[D]} | 1008.8^{[D]} | 53.941°N 0.927°W; SE705500 | 1986 | SPA, NCR, SAC | Map |
| River Hull Headwaters | ✓ | | 122 | 301.4 | 53.995°N 0.426°W; TA033566 | 1962 | NCR | Map |
| Roos Bog | | ✓ | 1.9 | 4.8 | 53.74°N 0.071°W; TA273288 | 1990 | GCR | Map |
| Skipsea Bail Mere | | ✓ | 43.9 | 108.4 | 53.98°N 0.23°W; TA162552 | 1998 | SAM, GCR | Map |
| South Cliffe Common | ✓ | | 61.4 | 151.7 | 53.813°N 0.698°W; SE858360 | 1988 | | Map |
| The Lagoons | ✓ | | 70.2 | 173.4 | 53.636°N 0.133°E; TA411176 | 1968 | SPA | Map |
| Thixen Dale and Longdale | ✓ | | 89.7 | 221.5 | SE831600, SE843606 & SE845593 | 1954 | | Map |
| Thorne Crowle and Goole Moors | ✓ | | 1919 | 4742.1 | 53.633°N 0.901°W; SE728157 | 1970 | SPA, WT, NNR, NCR, Ramsar site, SAC | Map |
| Tophill Low | ✓ | | 34.6 | 85.5 | 53.925°N 0.364°W; TA075489 | 1989 | | Map |
| White Carr Meadow | ✓ | | 1.1 | 2.7 | 53.901°N 0.805°W; SE786456 | 1990 | | Map |
| Withow Gap, Skipsea | | ✓ | 8.4 | 20.7 | 53.974°N 0.199°W; TA182546 | 1987 | GCR | Map |
| Wyedale | ✓ | | 12.5 | 30.8 | 53.805°N 0.604°W; SE920352 | 1986 | | Map |

== Notes ==
^{A} Grid reference is based on the British national grid reference system, also known as OSGB36, and is the system used by the Ordnance Survey.
^{B} Link to maps using the Nature on the Map service provided by Natural England.
^{C} The River Derwent site extends into the county of North Yorkshire and so can be found on the list of SSSIs in North Yorkshire.
^{D} Recorded as 86.2 kilometres (53.6 mi) in length, where the River Derwent forms the then district boundaries the length is included in both directions.
