= List of Sites of Special Scientific Interest in South Yorkshire =

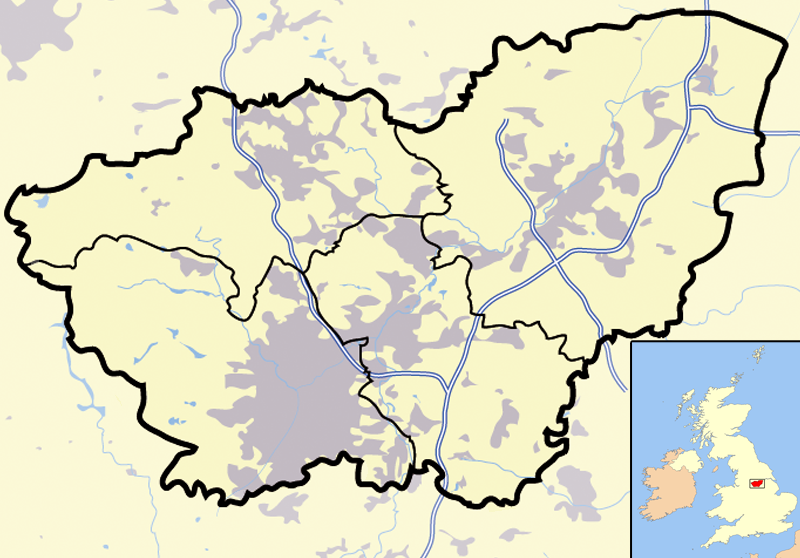
South Yorkshire shown within the UK.

This is a list of Sites of Special Scientific Interest (SSSIs) in South Yorkshire, United Kingdom. As of 2009, There are 35 sites designated within this Area of Search, of which 18 have been designated due to their biological interest, 14 due to its geological interest, and 3 for both biological and geological interest. In England the body responsible for designating SSSIs is Natural England, which chooses a site because of its fauna, flora, geological or physiographical features. Natural England took over the role of designating and managing SSSIs from English Nature in October 2006 when it was formed from the amalgamation of English Nature, parts of the Countryside Agency and the Rural Development Service. Natural England, like its predecessor, uses the 1974–1996 county system and as such the same approach is followed here, rather than, for example, merging all Yorkshire sites into a single list. Natural England produces citation sheets for each SSSI and are the main source of information for this list.

South Yorkshire's geography can be split into different types. The very west of South Yorkshire is part of Dark Peak which is part of the Peak District National Park and lies to the west of Sheffield. This extensive moorland is one of the largest semi-natural areas in England and has broad plateaus with rocky outcrops interspersed with valleys. Moving east the land elevation drops with a transition from the peak district to coal fields. Much of this area of transition has seen urban development with Sheffield being a good example.

The central region, to the north of Sheffield is largely dependent on the presence of coal measures in the area's geology. This is reflected by ancient woodlands, valley wetlands and large arable fields where there is no urban development. To the east of the coal measures is a strip of Magnesian Limestone which runs north to south between Sheffield and Doncaster. This open landscape is characterised by ancient woodlands and limestone grasslands and often has historic limestone monuments. However the light and dry soils are ideal for cultivation which means little of the original habitat remains. In the very east of South Yorkshire the Humberhead Levels dominate, with the area being relatively flat and dominated by the area's river systems. The area is predominantly covered with small fields or areas of peatland.

== Sites ==
Site name	Reason for designation		Area^{[A]}		Grid reference^{[B]}	Year in which notified	Map^{[C]}
Site name	Biological interest	Geological interest	Hectares	Acres	Grid reference^{[B]}	Year in which notified	Map^{[C]}
Anston Stones Wood	✓		33.7	88.3	SK531831	1955	Map
Ashfield Brick Pits		✓	0.6	1.4	SK515981	1955	Map
Bilham Sand Pits		✓	0.2	0.1	SE487066	1987	Map
Bradgate Brickworks		✓	0.9	2.2	SK413935	1988	Map
Cadeby Quarry		✓	97.0	240.0	SE522003	1977	Map
Canyards Hills	✓	✓	64.1	158.4	SK250950	1990	Map
Carlton Main Brickworks		✓	15.5	38.4	SE412081	1989	Map
Dark Peak^{[D]}	✓	✓	31,852.9	78,708.4	SK110960	1951	Map
Denaby Ings	✓		24.5	60.6	SE500009	1977	Map
Eastern Peak District Moors	✓	✓	8,094.4	20,001.6	SK270770	1955^{[E]}	Map
Edlington Wood	✓		99.7	246.7	SK549980	1979	Map
Hatfield Moors	✓		1,400.7	3,461.1	SE705060	1954	Map
Lindrick Golf Course	✓		22.0	54.4	SK543825, SK545828, SK553827	1987	Map
Little Don Stream Section		✓	1.1	2.6	SE222004	1977	Map
Maltby Low Common	✓		6.0	14.8	SK545913	1970	Map
Neepsend Brickworks		✓	4.3	10.6	SK350891	1988	Map
Neepsend Railway Cutting		✓	1.4	3.5	SK344894	1988	Map
New Edlington Brickpit		✓	0.2	0.4	SK531988	1989	Map
Owston Hay Meadows	✓		5.5	13.5	SE554114	1979	Map
Potteric Carr	✓		118.6	293.0	SE599003	1977	Map
Pye Flatts Meadows	✓		2.2	5.4	SE274052	1990	Map
River Idle Washlands^{[F]}	✓		88.6	219.0	SK662936, SK685937, SK706945, SK720963	1972	Map
Roche Abbey Woodlands	✓		52.8	143.8	SK542899	1979	Map
Sandall Beat	✓		63.9	157.9	SE613037	1984	Map
Shirley Pool	✓		15.5	38.4	SE568121	1955	Map
Spring Meadows, Alderman's Head & Cow Croft Meadows	✓		16.8	41.6	SE229005	2005	Map
Sprotbrough Gorge	✓		76.9	190.1	SE534007	1988	Map
Stairfoot Brickworks		✓	0.1	0.1	SE381048	1999	Map
Stannington Ruffs		✓	2.4	5.9	SK306891	1988	Map
Thorne Crowle and Goole Moors^{[G]}	✓		1,918.6	4,740.9	SE730160	1970	Map
Totley Wood	✓		14.7	36.4	SK325815	1954	Map
Wadsley Fossil Forest		✓	0.3	0.7	SK318913	1990	Map
Went Ings Meadows	✓		6.4	15.8	SE650183, SE654184	1981	Map
Wharncliffe Crags		✓	14.5	35.8	SK298974	1988	Map
Wood Lee Common		✓	6.4	15.8	SK533915	1958	Map

== See also ==
- List of SSSIs by Area of Search

== Notes ==
^{A} Data rounded to one decimal place.
^{B} Grid reference is based on the British national grid reference system, also known as OSGB36, and is the system used by the Ordnance Survey.
^{C} Link to maps using the Nature on the Map service provided by English Nature.
^{D} The Dark Peak site extends into three other counties and so can be found on lists of SSSIs in Derbyshire, Greater Manchester and West Yorkshire.
^{E} Incorporates three formers SSSIs: Hallam Moors being first notified in 1955, Eastern Moors in 1964 and Houndkirk Moor in 1972.
^{F} SSSI is split between South Yorkshire and Nottinghamshire. 36.7 hectares (90.6 acres) is in South Yorkshire.
^{G} SSSI is split between South Yorkshire, the East Riding of Yorkshire and Lincolnshire. 1309.1 hectares (3234.7 acres) lie in South Yorkshire.
