= Askham Bog =

Protected site and nature reserve in York, England

Coordinates: 53°55′30″N 01°07′57″W

- Site of Special Scientific Interest
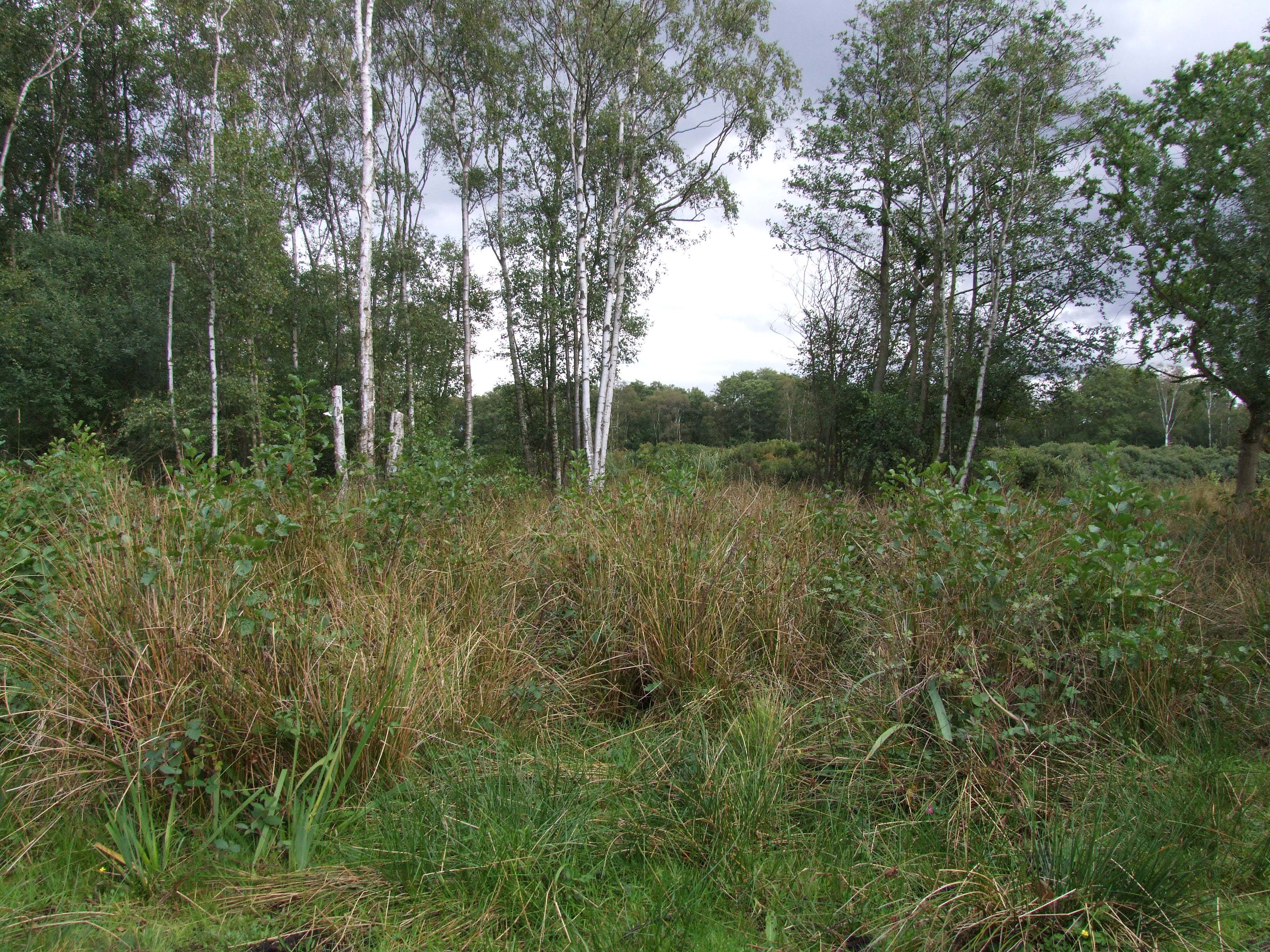
- Location of Askham Bog.
- Area of search: North Yorkshire
- Grid reference: SE 575 481
- Area: 110.7 acres (44.8 ha)
- Notification date: 1961
- Location map: Natural England

Askham Bog is small area of peat bog and Site of Special Scientific Interest situated within the Vale of York in North Yorkshire, England. It lies to the south-west of York, north of Copmanthorpe and near Askham Richard and Askham Bryan. It is regarded as one of the most ecologically diverse sites in Northern England.

During the 2010s, a development of 500 houses was proposed for the edge of the bog on the outskirts of York city, but this was overturned in 2020.

== History and geographical formation ==
Askham Bog formed in the Vale of York in a hollow which was flooded by meltwater from the last glacial retreat about 15,000 years ago. Two ridges of terminal moraine had formed on either side of the hollow, trapping the glacial meltwater between and behind them.

The bog's lowest layer is made up of sealed boulder clay, sand, and gravel. Above this is a distinct layer of organic deposits, which collectively reflect a series of biological and geological periods. The basal clay layer is covered by additional lake clay and nutrient-rich nekron mud, which is supplied by the surrounding moraines. Further up, there are layers of fen peat and sphagnum peat. The latter contains traces of Scorpidium and Eriophorum. The Nekron peat layer reflects a permanent shift to a relatively warm post-glacial climate. Formed during this time, this layer contains an abundance of plant remains, indicating a period of rich floral growth. Some of these plants include Potamogeton, holly-leaved naiad and bogbean.

When common reed colonised the bog, as evidenced by the presence of fossilised root fragments immediately above the Nekron bog layer, the extent of open water decreased. Consequently, a layer of fen peat gradually built up above the bog mud in the centre of the bog to form a raised bog. The increased elevation in the centre cut the bog off from the direct influx of base-rich water from the surrounding land. Rainfall leached out existing bases in the raised peat, leading to a net loss of bases from the peat in the centre of the bog. This gradual loss of bases increased the soil's acidity and caused the loss of the original rich bog community that previously covered the whole area.

The nutrient-poor, acidic environment created by the bog's gradual isolation from mineral-rich water sources allowed acidophilic sphagnum mosses to thrive on the raised bog and contribute significantly to the bulk of the peat formed above the fen margins. The continued net accumulation of peat led to a further increase in the elevation of the central peat dome. This eventually completely cut off the supply of base-rich groundwater and rendering the peat centre ombrotrophic. Conversely, the rich fen community at the margins, receiving an influx of base-rich groundwater from the surrounding moraines and creating ecological conditions similar to those of the East Anglian fens.

A site on the edge of Askham Bog was earmarked by a developer for a plot of 500 homes. The appeal by the community and Yorkshire Wildlife Trust enlisted the help of Sir David Attenborough, who said that "it is our collective responsibility to save it." The development was denied by planning inspectors in May 2020.

== Ecology and habitats ==
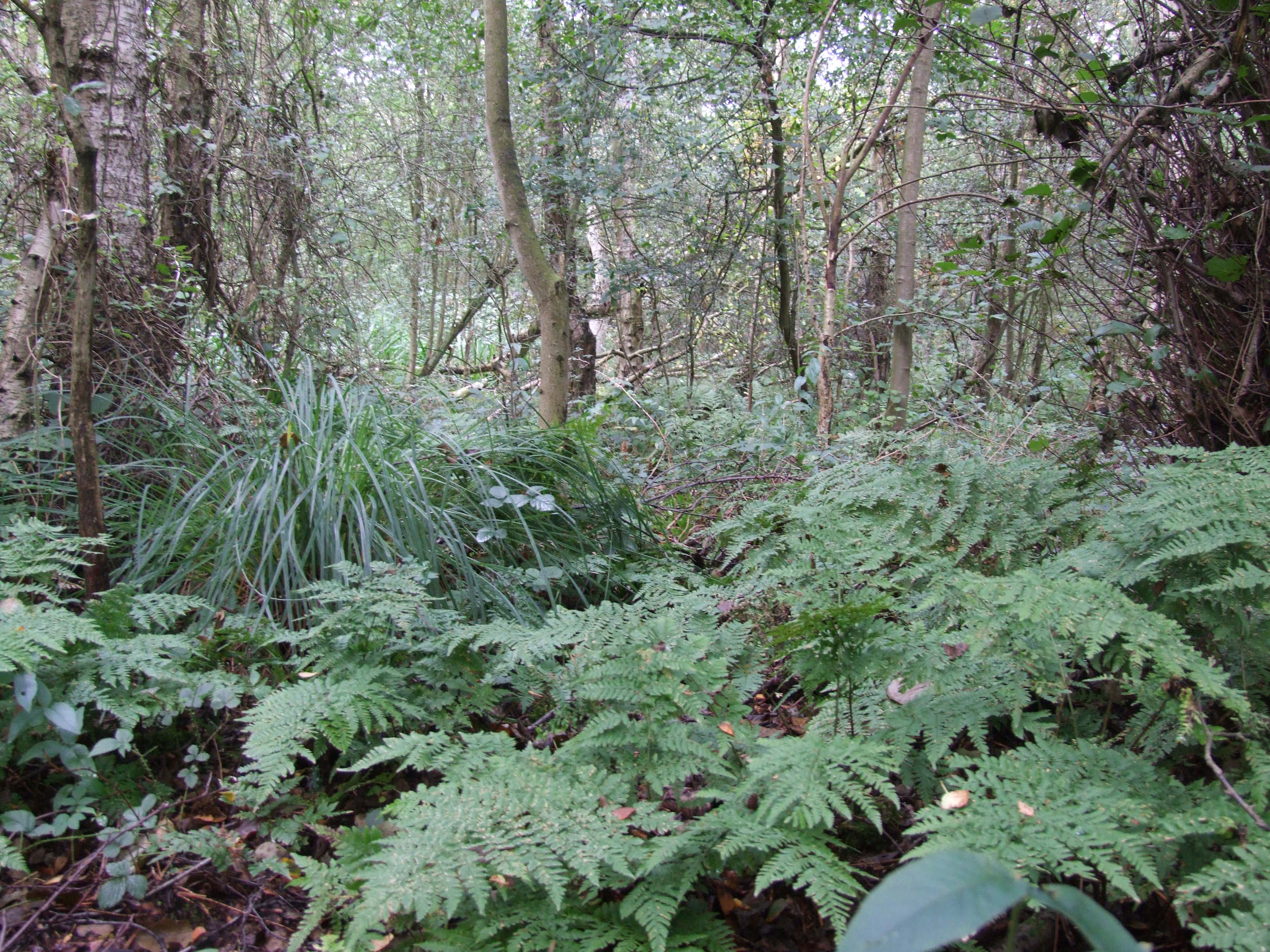
Habitat in Askham Bog

Askham Bog is regarded as one of the most ecologically diverse sites in Northern England; especially regarding plants, invertebrates and birds. The ecological diversity is due to a wide range of habitats ranging from fen-meadow with base-rich soils on the periphery to carr woodland and raised bog with acid soil in the centre, interspersed with dykes and stands of open water. This large diversity of habitats may be partly explained by the many successional stages present which generally become more advanced towards the centre. This in turn related to spatial differences in topography and soil pH. Askham Bog is one of the few sites in northern England to show such an array of habitat transitions.

Although the raised bog originally largely replaced the original fen, medieval peat cutting brought the vegetation back under the influence of base-rich groundwater. This extensive peat cutting, in turn, led to fen conditions returning around some of the previously acid soils.

Askham Bog is a heavily wooded area, with birch being widespread throughout. Willow also grows extensively throughout. Alder and grey sallow are locally dominant on the fen margins, while oak is dominant in the acid centre. Other tree species growing alongside oak in the acid centre include hazel, alder buckthorn and rowan. Birch has declined in favour of oak, alder and ash, especially where much of the wood in the north central part has been clear-felled. The reduction in canopy cover in the centre of the bog appears to have had a negative effect on peat growth here, probably through reduced shading and hence increased desiccation of the peat and easier influx of atmospheric pollutants. In recent decades, sulphur deposition on the bog has increased due to polluted air moving downwind from a large industrial area with coal-fired power stations.

== Natural history ==
=== Herbaceous plants ===
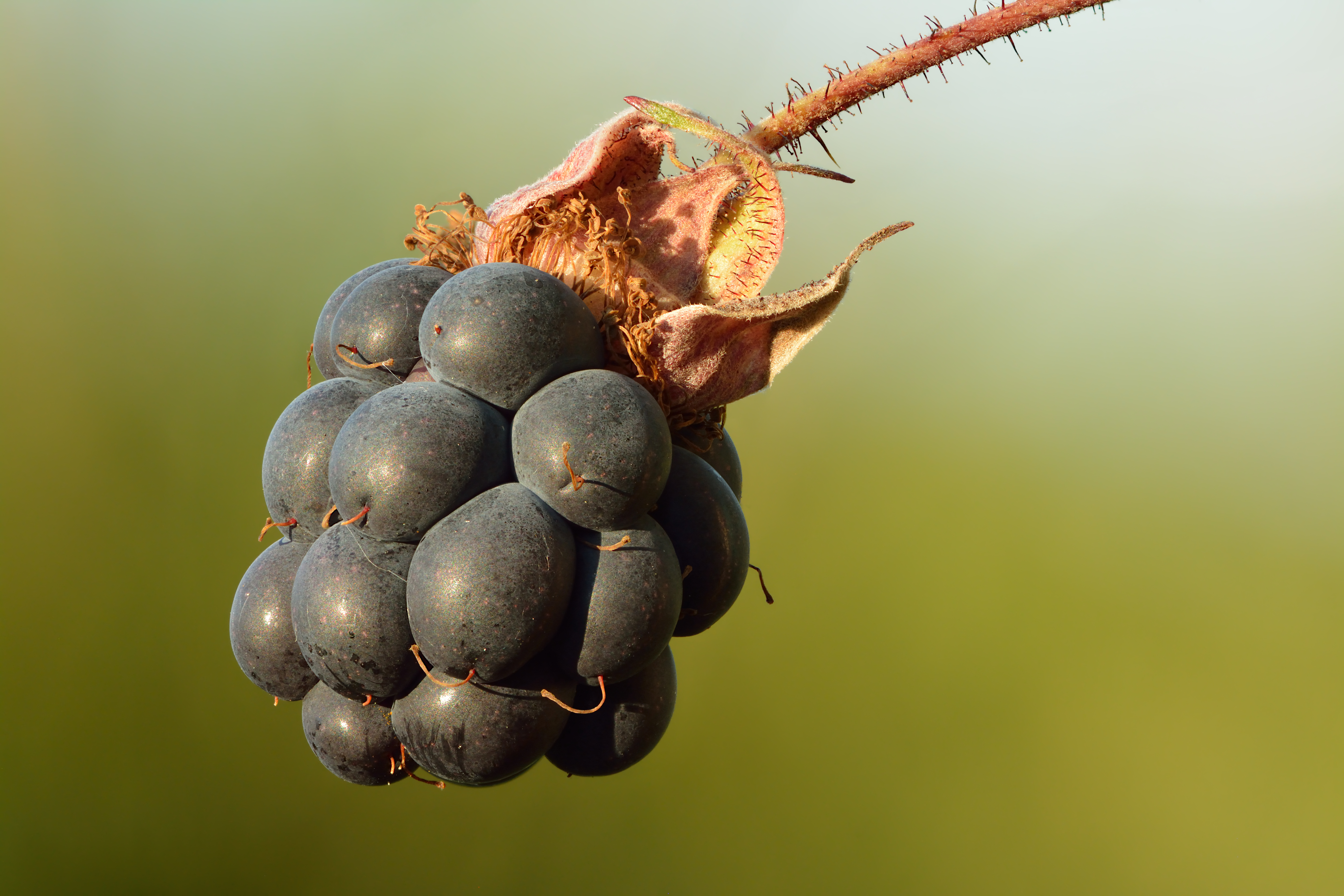
European dewberry

The diverse flora of Askham Bog is similar to plant communities in southern England. Notable species include greater spearwort, marsh stitchwort, saw sedge, marsh fern, great water dock, meadow thistle, purple small reed, Carex appropinquata and water violet. Askham Bog also holds the largest and most north-eastern colony in England of the rare gingerbread sedge Carex elongata, and is renowned for the presence of royal fern.

The vegetation of Askham Bog can be divided into two main groups, reflecting the broad underlying dichotomy between basic and acidic soil. One is a species-rich fen community around the margins. This includes characteristic species such as meadowsweet, common meadow rue, stinging nettle, marsh bedstraw, dewberry, bittersweet, skullcap, yellow loosestrife, creeping Jenny and rough meadow grass. The other community is a species-poor acid one towards the centre, including species such as Sphagnum palustre, purple moor grass, Rubus fruticosus and honeysuckle. Although the drop in pH and elevational increase on the peat domes is attributable to sphagnum growth, no sphagnum has been found in one vegetation assemblage characterized by honeysuckle and Rubus fruticosus within the acid centre of the bog. This appears to be inconsistent with the usual course of succession and may be explained by unusually high concentration of inorganic phosphate. Low water tables in the raised area may promote mineralization of phosphate, with low pH counteracting microbial conversion to organic phosphate, so that the resultant high inorganic phosphate component in the raised peat favours growth of this plant community.

=== Birds ===
Askham Bog is home to over 90 species of bird, attracting visitors in both winter and summer. Despite its proximity to potential sources of human disturbance, the bog provides a suitable refuge for wildlife within an unfavourable agricultural landscape, offering a rich supply of fruit and seeds in winter and invertebrates in summer. Known resident species include marsh tit, willow tit, treecreeper, kingfisher, goldcrest, bullfinch, tawny owl, buzzard, sparrowhawk and sometimes green woodpecker Winter visitors include fieldfare, redwing, brambling, siskin, lesser redpoll, goldfinch, snipe, jack snipe, woodcock, coot and sometimes grasshopper warbler. All migrant warblers have been found at the bog in spring and summer, with the reed beds in the northeast part in Near Wood comprising an important colony for reed warblers.

=== Invertebrates ===
Askham Bog is nationally recognised for its diverse invertebrate fauna, including various species of water beetle such as Haliplidae, Noteridae, Dytiscidae and Gyrinidae. The bog is also home to some rare beetle species including Dromius sigma, Agabus undulatus; alongside one record of Pselaphus dresdensis which has been found in moss from pond margins at the bog, the only known location in England. Beetle abundance and species richness have been decreasing at Askham Bog since the early 20th century. This coincides with the establishment of a municipal landfill site at the adjacent Challoner's Whin. Other characteristic insect species include the fen square-spot moth and the emperor dragonfly.

Given the relatively dry status of the reserve and gradual encroachment by trees, there is a large proportion of wetland indicator spider species. This may be because the current spider community reflects historic moisture levels within the bog and has not yet fully responded to habitat changes. A very rare spider species Cornicularia kochi (O.P.-C) in its hundreds was once recorded in piles of cut-down Phragmites during winter.

=== Mammals and amphibians ===
Typical amphibians of Askham Bog include common frog, common toad, and smooth newt. Typical mammals include roe deer and red foxes. The water vole was once common at Askham Bog, but has now been largely displaced by invasive American mink.

== Past use and current management ==
=== Peat cutting ===
From the early Roman period until the mid-18th century, Askham Bog and its surroundings appear to have been intensely exploited for peat as fuel. The earliest evidence of nearby peat cutting from the Roman period was discovered in the form of lumps of sphagnum peat in a Roman well in York.

In the Middle Ages, peat was cut by the villagers of Dringhouses and Acomb, as evidenced by the written bylaws of the Manor of Drighouses and Acomb Court Rolls, which restricted peat cutting by tenants. The severe penalties imposed by these legal restrictions reflect the attempt by the local authorities back then to counteract the damaging intensity of peat extraction at Askham Bog. Intensive peat cutting had probably caused substantial topographical changes on the bog since its original geographic formation. In turn, extraction would have lowered the acid peat layer, allowing base-rich groundwater to inundate the centre and transform it into an open fen. Further evidence of this can be seen in the form of dykes surrounding the current main peat domes. These dykes would have been dug to facilitate the removal of peat by boat.

After peat cutting ceased around the 1750s, the whole bog became vegetated with woody shrubs and trees. It was then extensively used as game reserve from the late 19th century until the Second World War, which probably explains the extensive felling of Far Wood during this time. In 1946, the bog was acquired by Sir Francis Terry and Joseph Rowntree, both of whom subsequently gifted it to Yorkshire Naturalists' Trust (now known as Yorkshire Wildlife Trust) in 1946. It is the oldest nature reserve managed by Yorkshire Wildlife Trust.

=== Hemp cultivation ===
Distinct forms of fossil evidence found between layers of fen peat and Scorpidium-Sphagnum peat at Askham Bog suggest that hemp was once cultivated there. The evidence takes the form of preserved hemp achenes and pollen, which may be relics of retting (steeping in water) Pollen of aquatic plants such water lilies and cattails have also been found in the same peat cores as hemp seeds and pollen. It is therefore suggested that these hemp residues were submerged during this period.

Hemp cultivation at Askham was probably intensive during the Tudor period, although the exact dates are unknown. The crop was extensively cultivated and retted in England by royal decree to produce hemp rope for the British navy. Askham Bog's Acomb Court Roll of 1594 provides documentary evidence of restrictions on hemp retting due to the unpleasant odour produced by the retting process and the potential for the water used in the process to pollute rivers. However, hemp retting ceased in the 19th century due to increased imports of hemp rope from Europe and Russia, as well as a shift towards using sisal from America and jute from India..

=== Habitat conservation ===
The Yorkshire Wildlife Trust was originally established to conserve Askham Bog. The first management plan aimed to maintain habitat diversity throughout the bog. To this end, the National Conservation Corps was enlisted to create more open water by digging ponds and blocking ditches, as well as clearing scrub from the damp cotton-grass areas. In 1998, Yorkshire Wildlife Trust received a substantial Heritage Lottery Fund for the restoration of many of its nature reserves. A large portion of this funding was used to manage Askham Bog and maintain suitable water conditions for the wildlife.

Most of the species-rich fen areas are grazed by Exmoor ponies to encourage early successional plant species such as marsh orchid and meadow thistle, and to suppress vigorous grasses, reed and saplings. This is considered a more effective management tool than cutting, though some meadows on the site are still cut for hay..
