= Beckhead Plantation =

Nature reserve and SSSI in the East Riding of Yorkshire, England

- Site of Special Scientific Interest
- Shown within the East Riding of Yorkshire
- Location of Beckhead Plantation.
- Area of search: East Riding of Yorkshire
- Grid reference: SE816537
- Coordinates: 53.973378°N 0.756673°W
- Interest: Biological
- Area: 3.67 acres (0.0149 km^{2}; 0.00573 sq mi)
- Notification date: 1968

Beckhead Plantation is a Site of Special Scientific Interest (SSSI) and nature reserve in the East Riding of Yorkshire, England. It is located close to the village of Great Givendale on the Yorkshire Wolds. The site, which was designated a SSSI in 1968, is managed as a nature reserve by the Yorkshire Wildlife Trust. It lies on chalk land in Given Dale. The site is important because it demonstrates many of the characteristic features of a northern ash woodland on chalk. The tree canopy is dominated by ash with some wych elm, field maple and rowan while the understorey contains shrub species including hazel, guelder rose, elder, gooseberry and fly honeysuckle.

== See also ==
- List of Sites of Special Scientific Interest in the East Riding of Yorkshire
