= Derwent Ings =

Water-meadow in Yorkshire, England

- Site of Special Scientific Interest
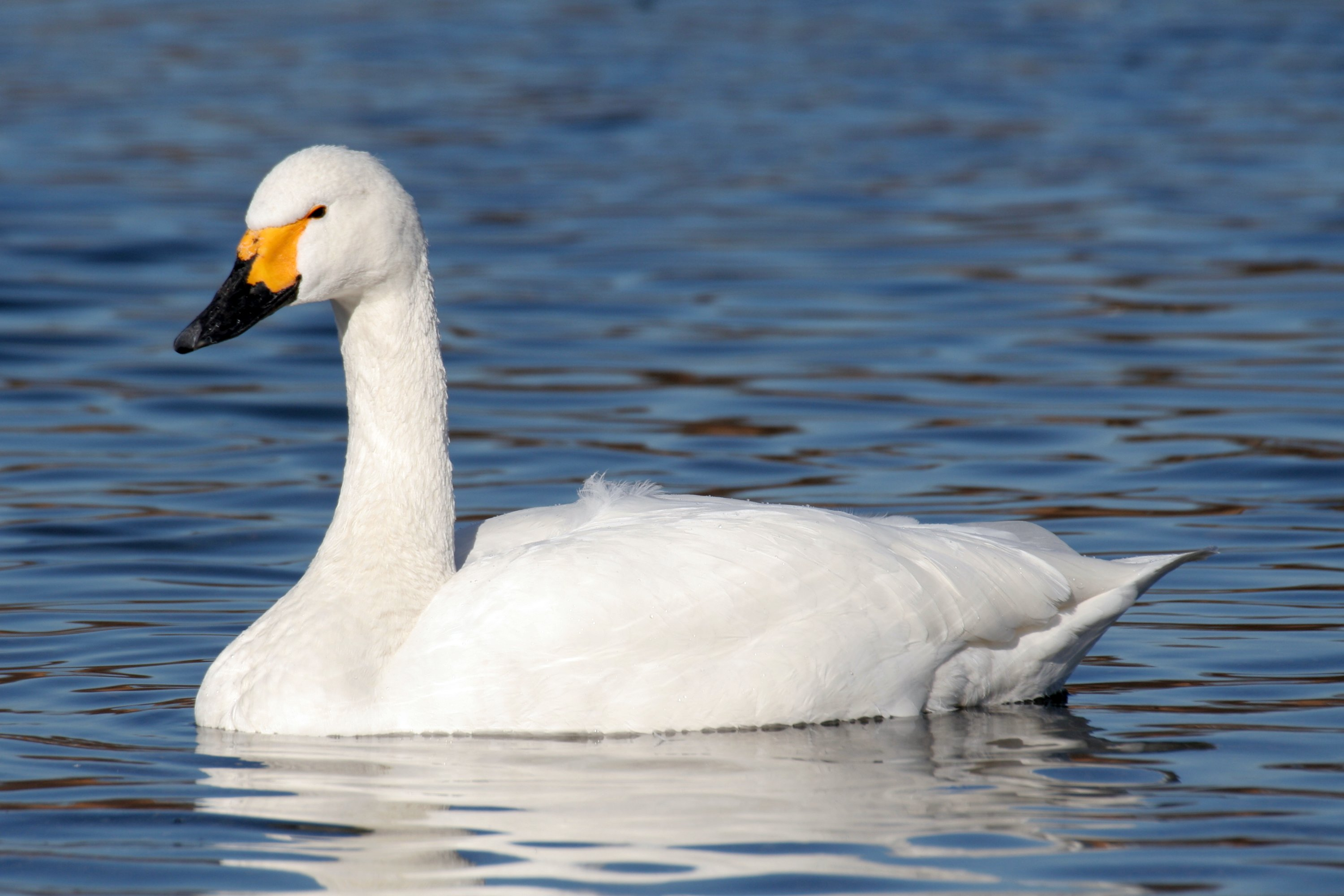
- Adult Bewick's swan (Cygnus columbianus bewickii)

- Shown within the East Riding of Yorkshire
- Location of Derwent Ings.
- Area of search: East Riding of Yorkshire, North Yorkshire
- Grid reference: SE 703347
- Coordinates: 53.911236°N 0.930547°W
- Interest: Biological
- Area: 1,636.91 acres (6.6243 km^{2}; 2.55767 sq mi)
- Notification date: 1975

Derwent Ings is a Site of Special Scientific Interest (SSSI) divided between North Yorkshire and the East Riding of Yorkshire, England. Derwent Ings is of international significance and has been designated a Wetland of International Importance under the Ramsar Convention and as a Special Protection Area under the terms of the European Community Directive. Part of the site is owned by the Yorkshire Wildlife Trust and is managed in conjunction with English Nature. It lies adjacent to the River Derwent between Sutton upon Derwent and Menthorpe. The site, which was designated a SSSI in 1975, consists of a series of neutral alluvial flood meadows, fen and swamp communities and freshwater habitats. It is one of the most important examples of agriculturally unimproved species-rich alluvial flood meadow habitat remaining in the UK.

In winter the Ings support internationally important concentrations of waterfowl, in excess of 20,000 individuals, together with nationally important numbers of Bewick's swan, teal, wigeon, mallard, pochard, golden plover and ruff.

== See also ==
- List of Sites of Special Scientific Interest in the East Riding of Yorkshire
