= Billingley =

Village and civil parish in South Yorkshire, England

Coordinates: 53.53°N 1.35°W

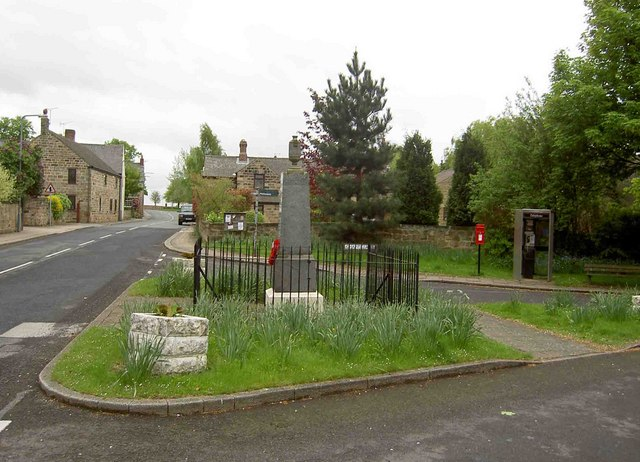
- War memorial in the village

- Location within South Yorkshire
- Population: 210 (2011 census)
- OS grid reference: SE430039
- Civil parish: Billingley
- Metropolitan borough: Barnsley
- Metropolitan county: South Yorkshire
- Region: Yorkshire and the Humber
- Country: England
- Sovereign state: United Kingdom
- Post town: BARNSLEY
- Postcode district: S72
- Dialling code: 01709
- Police: South Yorkshire
- Fire: South Yorkshire
- Ambulance: Yorkshire
- UK Parliament: Barnsley South

Billingley is a village and civil parish in the Metropolitan Borough of Barnsley, in South Yorkshire, England, 7 miles (11 km) east of Barnsley. At the 2001 census it had a population of 177, increasing to 210 at the 2011 Census.

The name Billingley possibly derives from the Old English Billaingaslēah meaning 'wood or clearing of the people of Billa' or Bilhāmingaslēah meaning the 'wood or clearing of the people of Bilham'. Perhaps, it may simply derive from billinglēah meaning 'wood or clearing at the hill'.

== See also ==
- Listed buildings in Billingley
