= Anston Stones Wood =

Protected area in South Yorkshire, England

Coordinates: 53.342306°N 1.201607°W

- Site of Special Scientific Interest
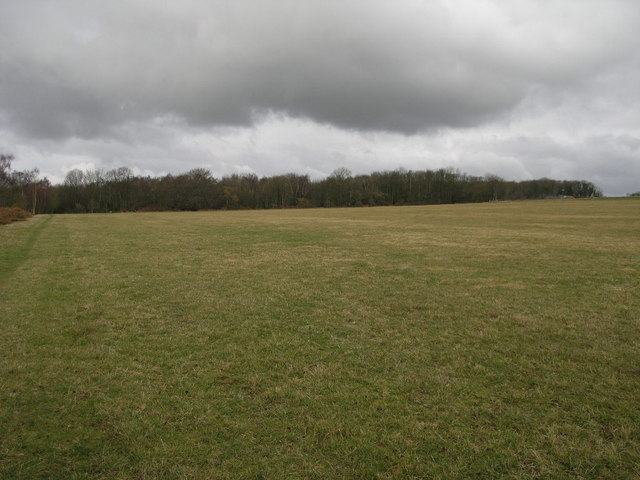
- Location of Anston Stones Wood.
- Area of search: South Yorkshire
- Grid reference: SK 531 831
- Interest: Biological
- Area: 33.7 ha (83 acres)
- Notification date: 1955
- Location map: Map

Anston Stones Wood (grid reference SK531831) is a 33.7 hectare (88.3 acre) biological site of Special Scientific Interest in South Yorkshire. The site was notified in 1955. The site contains the second best example of limestone woodland in South Yorkshire. It is also a Local Nature Reserve.

== See also ==
- List of Sites of Special Scientific Interest in South Yorkshire
