= Carlton Main Brickworks =

Protected area in South Yorkshire, England

Coordinates: 53.568094°N 1.37707°W

- Site of Special Scientific Interest
- Location of Carlton Main Brickworks.
- Area of search: South Yorkshire
- Grid reference: SE412081
- Interest: Geological
- Area: 15.5 ha (38 acres)
- Notification date: 1989
- Location map: Nature on the map

Carlton Main Brickworks (grid reference SE412081) is a 15.5 hectare (38.4 acre) geological site of Special Scientific Interest in South Yorkshire. It opened alongside Grimethorpe colliery in the mid-1890s, and has been producing quality bricks for well over a century. The site was notified in 1989.

== See also ==
- List of Sites of Special Scientific Interest in South Yorkshire
