= Bradgate Brickworks =

Geological site in South Yorkshire, England

Coordinates: 53.436847°N 1.377486°W

- Site of Special Scientific Interest
- Location of Bradgate Brickworks.
- Area of search: South Yorkshire
- Grid reference: SK413935
- Interest: Geological
- Area: 0.9 ha (2.2 acres)
- Notification date: 1988
- Location map: Nature on the map

Bradgate Brickworks (grid reference SK413935) is a 0.9 hectare (2.2 acre) geological site of Special Scientific Interest in South Yorkshire. The site was notified in 1988. In November 2001 a report by Rotherham Borough Council noted concern that overgrown vegetation at the site presented a risk to the geological features of the quarry face and proposed the acquisition and management of the site by the Council.

== See also ==
- List of Sites of Special Scientific Interest in South Yorkshire
