= Ashfield Brick Pits =

Coordinates: 53.477296°N 1.223187°W

- Site of Special Scientific Interest
- Location of Ashfield Brick Pits.
- Area of search: South Yorkshire
- Grid reference: SK515981
- Interest: Geological
- Area: 0.6 ha (1.5 acres)
- Notification date: 1955
- Location map: Nature on the map

Ashfield Brick Pits (grid reference SK515981) is a 0.6 hectare (1.4 acre) geological site of Special Scientific Interest south of Conisbrough in South Yorkshire. The site was notified in 1955.

== See also ==
- List of Sites of Special Scientific Interest in South Yorkshire
