= Melbourne and Thornton Ings =

Protected area in the East Riding of Yorkshire, England

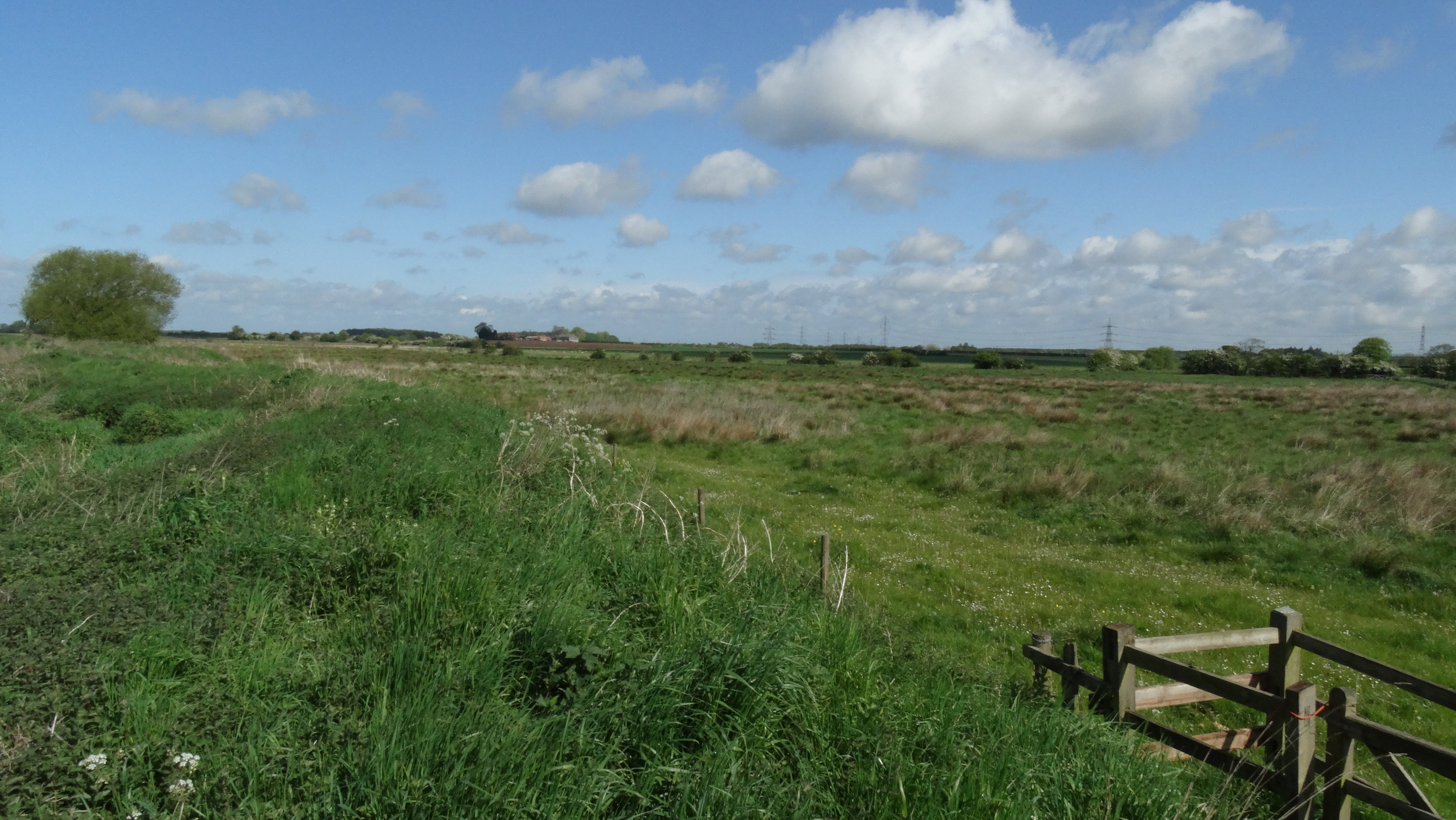
- Path across the Ings, near Melbourne
- Interactive map of Melbourne and Thornton Ings
- Coordinates: 53°53′33″N 0°51′54″W

Melbourne and Thornton Ings is a Site of Special Scientific Interest (SSSI) in the East Riding of Yorkshire, England. It is located near to the village of Melbourne, north of the Pocklington Canal. This series of meadows supports a high diversity of plant species and a high diversity of bird species.

Melbourne and Thornton Ings is situated within the Lower Derwent Valley National Nature Reserve that is a Special Protection Area and is registered under the Ramsar Convention.

== Biology ==
The wet grasslands in Melbourne and Thornton Ings contain herbaceous plant species including marsh stitchwort and tubular water-dropwort. In drier grasslands, plant species include marsh valerian, sneezewort, common meadow-rue, meadowsweet, marsh marigold, marsh arrowgrass, bog bean, early marsh orchid and marsh pea. Plant species in the ditches water violet and mare’s-tail.

Insect species include the red-eyed damselfly.

Bird species recorded in Melbourne and Thornton Ings include pintail, garganey, gadwall, curlew, lapwing, snipe, redshank, oystercatcher and common sandpiper. In winter, teal, wigeon and Bewicks swan have been recorded in this protected area.

Otters have been recorded in this protected area.

== Land ownership ==
Part of the land within Melbourne and Thornton Ings SSSI is owned by the Crown Estate.
