= Tophill Low =

Nature reserve in the East Riding of Yorkshire, England

- Site of Special Scientific Interest
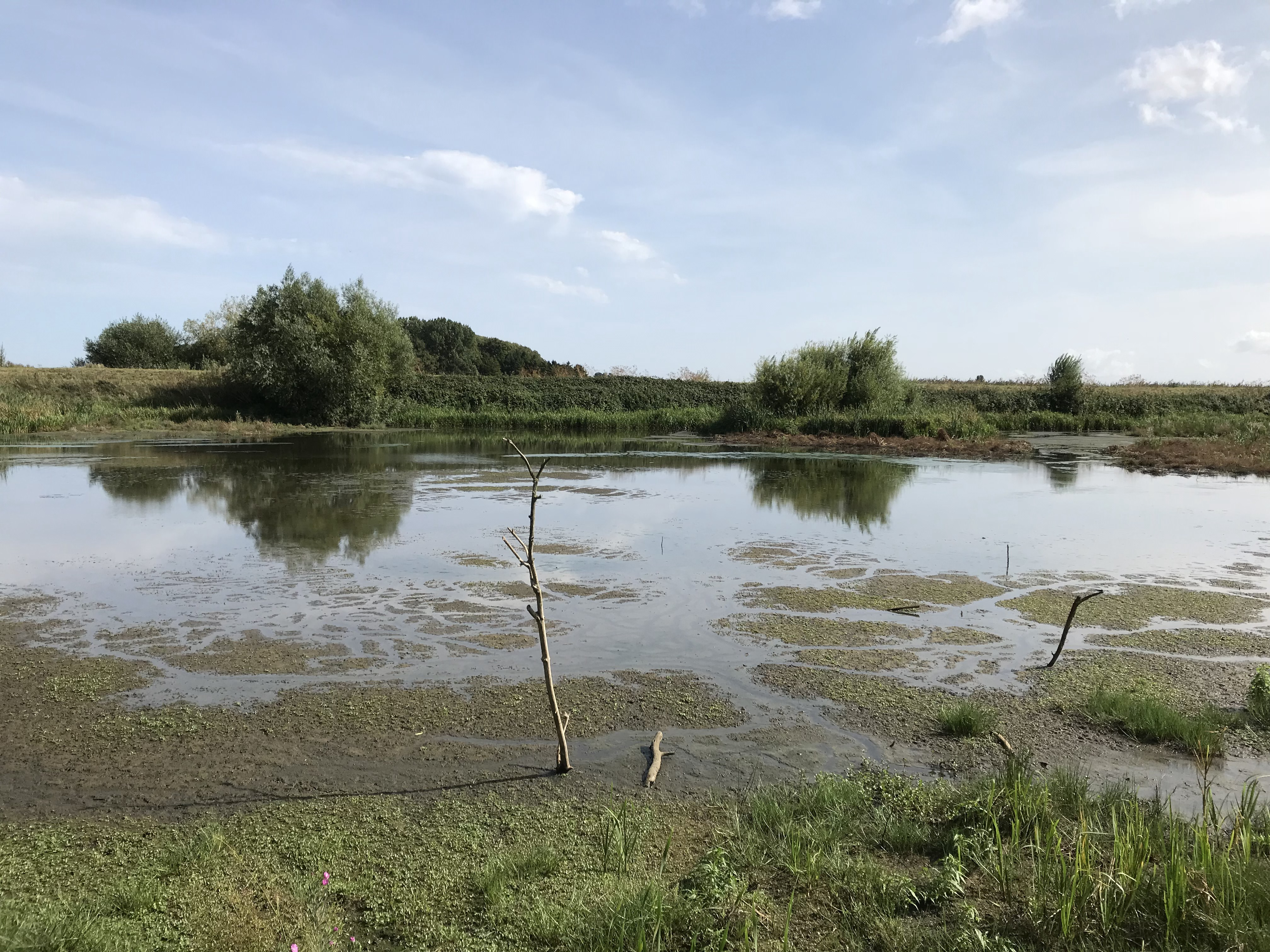
- View from the North Lagoon hide at the Tophill Low nature reserve (taken 30 August 2018)

- Shown within the East Riding of Yorkshire
- Location of Tophill Low.
- Area of search: East Riding of Yorkshire
- Grid reference: TA 073 486
- Coordinates: 53.922431°N 0.36757357°W
- Interest: Biological
- Area: 34.6225 hectares (85.554 acres)
- Notification date: 1989

Tophill Low is a nature reserve and Site of Special Scientific Interest (SSSI) in the East Riding of Yorkshire, England. The site is also an active water treatment works, operated by Yorkshire Water. It lies adjacent to the River Hull approximately 6 miles (9.7 km) south west of Driffield, and 3 miles (4.8 km) east of the village of Watton. The site, which was designated a SSSI in 1989, consists of two artificial reservoirs. The nature reserve extends further to a total area of 300 acres (120 hectares).

After three years of renovation and replanting, the reserve opened in March 2023. In June 2023, it celebrated its 30th anniversary.

It is important as one of few inland standing open water bodies suitable for wintering wildfowl in the East Riding of Yorkshire. The reservoirs support nationally important numbers of gadwall, shoveler, and tufted duck. Also present are locally important numbers of goldeneye, great crested grebe, mallard, pochard, teal, and wigeon. The wider nature reserve comprises a variety of habitats with grassland, marshes, ponds, and woods supporting over 160 bird species across the year. In October 2025, a rare migrant white-throated needletail was spotted on the reserve.

It is also an important habitat for insects, including dragonflies such as the emperor dragonfly and migrant hawker,, and butterflies and moths such as the clouded yellow, silver-washed fritillary, purple hairstreak, garden tiger, and hummingbird hawkmoth.

== See also ==
- List of Sites of Special Scientific Interest in the East Riding of Yorkshire
