= Rifle Butts Quarry =

SSSI in the East Riding of Yorkshire, England

- Site of Special Scientific Interest
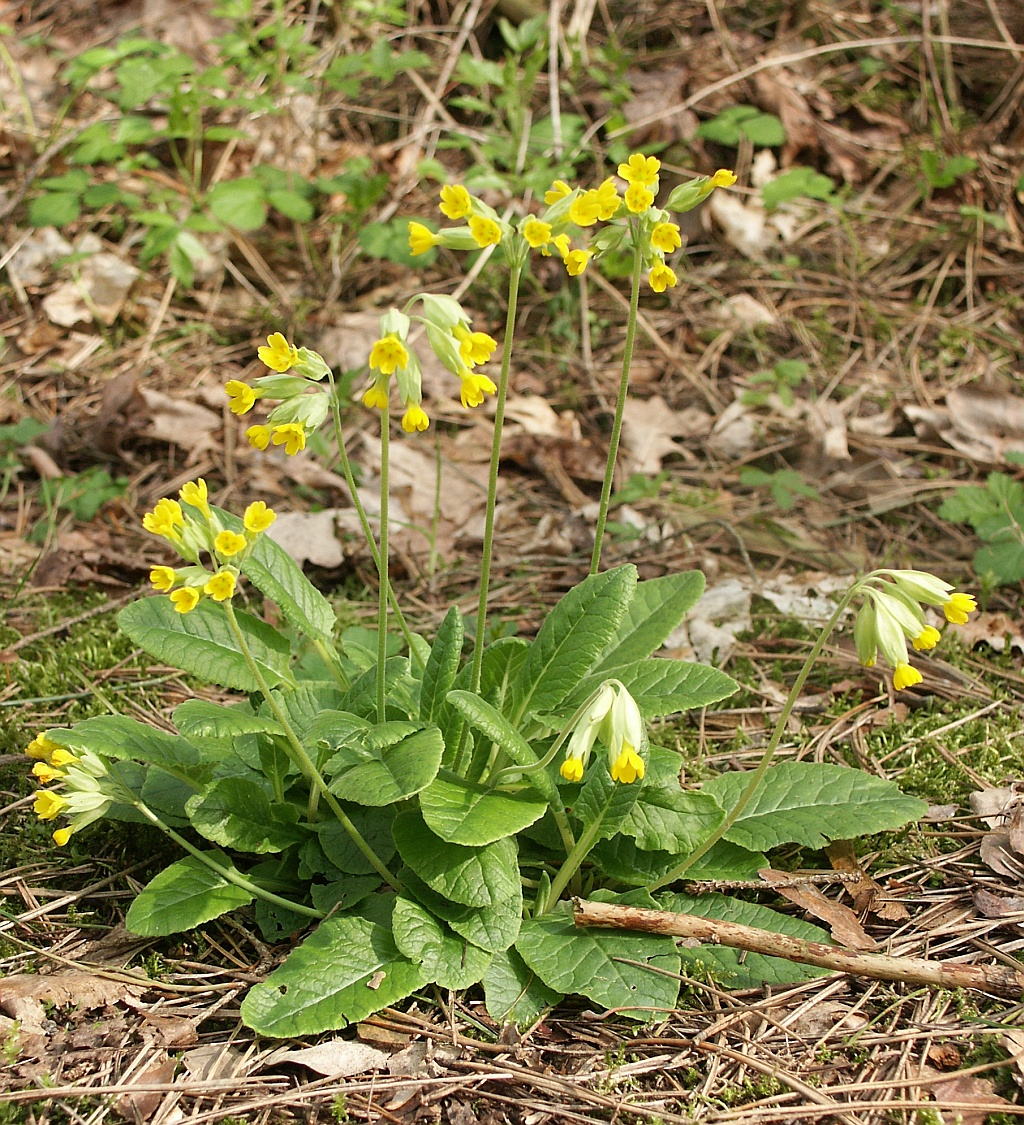
- Primula veris cowslip

- Shown within the East Riding of Yorkshire
- Location of Rifle Butts Quarry.
- Area of search: East Riding of Yorkshire
- Grid reference: SE898426
- Coordinates: 53.872284°N 0.634952°W
- Interest: Geological
- Area: 0.7 acres (0.0028 km^{2}; 0.0011 sq mi)
- Notification date: 1975

Rifle Butts Quarry is a Site of Special Scientific Interest (SSSI) in the East Riding of Yorkshire, England. The particular interest of this reserve is the geological feature exposed on the quarry face. The site is owned by the Yorkshire Wildlife Trust. The exposure which is identified as being of national importance in the Geological Conservation Review shows a Cretaceous unconformity, where sediments from the Jurassic and Lower Cretaceous periods were eroded away. It shows a section of Red Chalk and White Chalk overlying Lias.

A shelter has been constructed to protect the quarry face from erosion. The reserve is situated on the western edge of the Yorkshire Wolds, one mile south-east of Goodmanham and two miles from Market Weighton. The site, which was designated a SSSI in 1952, has over 150 plants recorded. It still displays some characteristic chalk species, including cowslip, marjoram, field scabious and wild basil. Breeding birds include willow warbler and yellowhammer.
