= Potteric Carr =

Land area in Yorkshire, England

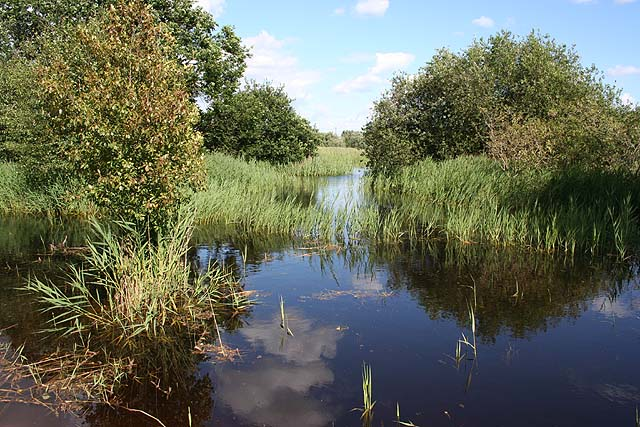
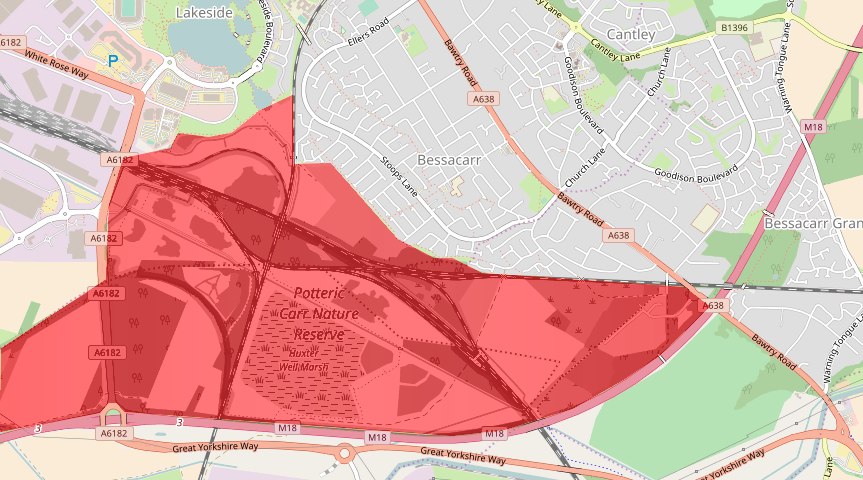
- Potteric Carr Wetlands Extent of Potteric Carr

- Location within Yorkshire and the Humber
- Location: Yorkshire, England
- Coordinates: 53.493°N 1.117°W

Potteric Carr is a large area of land to the southeast of Doncaster, in Yorkshire, England, over 3,000 acres (12 km^{2}) in size. Part of the area is now a nature reserve.

== History ==
One of the earliest references to Potteric Carr comes from the itinerary of John Leland c.1540:

Before I came to the town, I passed the ford of a brooke, which, as I remember is called Rossington Bridge…. The soil about Doncaster hath very good meadow, corn and some wood.

As Leland travelled into Doncaster from Bawtry, he passed through a landscape unfamiliar to us today. Sherwood Forest then extended to the very boundaries of Doncaster and venerable oaks dotted the landscape from Bawtry to Hatfield. To the west of the road from Rossington Bridge into Doncaster, Leland passed the "largely impenetrable morass of bog and fen known locally as Potteric Carr". Earlier he would have caught glimpses in the east of a similar wild tract of marshy country which then covered the whole of the flat land between the River Don and the River Trent.

== From Roman Times until 1849 ==
At the time of the Roman occupation much of lowland Britain was open farmland with regimented field systems used for agriculture since the Iron Age, which can be seen in Dr Derick Riley's air photographs of nearby Bawtry Road and Hurst Lane where the Roman Till Bridge Lane runs through the earlier Iron Age field systems. However, most of the land to the east of Doncaster is only a few metres above sea level and consequently would at that time have comprised a vast marshy area. There is evidence that the Romans made some attempts at drainage but their work fell into disrepair on their departure from Britain. Little is known of the next 1000 years but, by the time of Henry VIII, Potteric Carr was just a small part of Hatfield Chase, the largest deer chase in the realm. The chase eventually fell from royal favour about the time of the reign of Elizabeth I, due to its permanently inundated state.

Over the next 150 years a number of largely unsuccessful attempts at draining the Carr were made and during this time a duck decoy was established. The duck decoy was a method, perfected in the Netherlands, of catching ducks. The idea may have been introduced to the area by Dutch workers who came to Britain with Cornelius Vermuyden who is noted for his drainage schemes in the English Fens and the nearby Isle of Axholme. The proceeds from the decoy were distributed amongst the poor of Doncaster. The decoy was operated for about 130 years but its closure was foreshadowed in the 1760s when a civil engineer, John Smeaton, carried out the final and most effective drainage scheme so that by the end of the century much of the area was under agriculture. So successful was the drainage that the only remnant of the original flora was probably confined to a small area in and around the now disused decoy.

In the first half of the 19th century a number of afforestation schemes were carried out at the Old Eaa, Young Eaa and Beeston and many hedges were planted.

Thus by the middle of the 19th century the landscape was probably typical of an English rural scene with fields, hedges, trees and larger tracts of woodland all being maintained by the efficiency of the drains. The great industrial era was just around the corner, however, and the next 100 years would see further remarkable changes to the area.

== Industrial development 1849–1950 ==
In 1849, the Great Northern Railway was built across the Carr cutting through the Old Eaa Plantation and the centre of the decoy totally destroying in the process the last refuge of many scarce plants. The construction of this railway was the beginning of an era in Doncaster and, to this day, the town is considered as a major railway centre. With the railways came workshops and new residential development was required to house the employees of the railway workshops. Hence, rows of inexpensive houses were erected around the periphery of the town particularly in the Wheatley and Hexthorpe areas.

The railway was a lifeline for another new industry – the coal industry – which was rapidly eclipsing the agriculture which had dominated the area in the 18th century. Both industries were hungry for land and in 1862 the Great Northern Railway Company purchased 160,000 square metres between the Doncaster-Sheffield road and the decoy for the construction of a marshalling yard for coal traffic. The work was completed in 1866, and the sidings ended at about the centre of the decoy. At the same time the Gainsborough branch line was being constructed and this cut through Stoven's Plantation just as the main line had done in 1849.

In the ensuing years, Doncaster expanded considerably, particularly after deep coal seams were found in the district and, in conjunction with this, there was a further expansion of the railway system. Around 1880, the extension of the decoy sidings completely destroyed the Decoy Wood and, at the turn of the century, the Dearne Valley Railway sliced another piece of land from the Carr fragmenting Stoven's Plantation yet again.

In 1908, the South Yorkshire Joint Railway was constructed, with a link to Dinnington in the south. Where this line crossed the main London-Edinburgh line, loop lines were constructed to link the north and south sides of the decoy sidings and also the Dearne Valley Line – the area became what has been described as the ‘Spaghetti Junction’ of the local railway network.

Within the next 20 years several local collieries were opened including Rossington and this resulted in a considerable amount of railway activity in the area, particularly in the inter-war period. A development which was associated with the railway sidings was the deposition of an area of colliery waste on the south side of the Great Northern Railway. This area, Childers Wood, has since been colonised by an interesting and now well developed tree community, comprising mainly silver birch.

Certain link railways were never fully utilised however and, following the post war decline in railway freight traffic, some of the lines on the Carr became disused. It is paradoxical that at a time of increasing land values these lines became derelict and, more importantly, so did several parcels of land sandwiched between the railways – land which was obviously not an economical proposition for farming.

This industrial period, which brought so much activity in the early quarter of the 20th century, considerably fragmented the area though the wildlife for which the Carr was once famous had long since gone.

== Recent developments 1950–1968 ==
After suffering the effects of various drainage schemes, considerable agricultural activity and also industrial expansion, Potteric Carr was to endure yet another development which was to have a tremendous effect on the area.

In 1951, an underground seam from Rossington Colliery undermined the area of Low Ellers, and was followed by further seams which affected the whole of the Carr between 1960 and 1967. The effects were not immediate. In 1955, the area of Low Ellers was no more than a damp pasture and even by 1959 had not become much wetter. From this time onwards, however, the effects of subsidence became more severe and by 1963 the eastern side of Low Ellers had been transformed into marsh with a small, but permanent, area of open water. The subsidence continued and by 1965 Balby Carr had also flooded whilst the marsh at Low Ellers had extended. After a lapse of 200 years the term "inundated" could once again be used to describe part of Potteric Carr. Those areas which had not become completely flooded were at least very wet. One loss during this period were the trees in the Young Eaa Plantation and a part of the Old Eaa Plantation which died as a consequence of the flooding. There followed, however, a very fast colonisation of the area by marsh plant communities which once typified the Carr and naturally, following this, the return of the animal life.

In parallel with this, as a result of Dr Beeching, various railway line across the Carr became disused leaving, primarily, the East Coast Main Line with the Lincoln spur, and the main north–south mineral line (former South Yorkshire Joint). The former Dearne Valley line was closed though a short link was preserved from the South Yorkshire Joint to the Edlington Colliery, though this was later closed when the colliery was closed in the 1980s.

== Potteric Carr Nature Reserve ==
Potteric Carr Nature Reserve
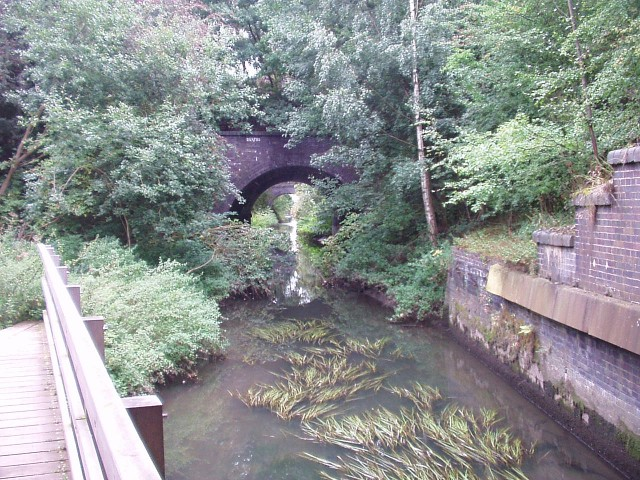
- Series of bridges crossing over the Mother Drain at Potteric Carr Nature Reserve
- Interactive map of Potteric Carr Nature Reserve
- Location: Mallard Way, Balby, Doncaster, England DN4 8DB
- Coordinates: 53.49574°N 1.09698°W
- Created: 1968
- Operator: Yorkshire Wildlife Trust
- Status: Site of Special Scientific Interest
- Website: www.ywt.org.uk/potteric_appeal

In 1968, a small part of Potteric Carr was made into the Yorkshire Wildlife Trust's Potteric Carr Nature Reserve, and since then the reserve has been developed and extended and covered 580 acres (235 hectares) in 2015, with the addition of Loversall Fields and Beeston Plantation. It comprises a mixture of habitats from open water and marsh through reed-fen, wet woodland (Carrland) and scrub. In places, there are remnants of the kind of habitat that existed 250 years ago.

It is one of Yorkshire Wildlife Trust's flagship reserves, one of their largest, and a gateway site.

The reserve has around 5.0 miles (8 km) of paths (3.1 miles (5 km) accessible to wheelchairs, unassisted), 14 viewing hides (10 suitable for people with disabilities) and a visitor centre with a café, where local produce is used whenever possible.

The reserve is bisected by railway lines and half has been designated by Natural England as a Site of Special Scientific Interest (SSSI) for its reed-fen communities.

In 2018 Potteric Carr Volunteers were awarded the Queen's Award for Voluntary Service (QAVS), the MBE for volunteer groups, in the nature reserve's Golden Jubilee Year.

In 2021 Yorkshire Water was fined after a leak at Balby water treatment works, in March 2017, polluted the site. Yorkshire Water was fined £150,000 and ordered to pay costs of £36,506 at Sheffield Magistrates' Court. Sewage sludge had entered a tributary of the Mother Drain channel.

=== Wildlife ===
Among notable bird species at the reserve are now breeding bitterns. Around 65 species breed there each year, including black-necked grebe, marsh harrier, and Cetti's warbler, and the reserve is a good viewing spot for starling murmurations.

Marsh plants include greater spearwort, lesser water-plantain, tubular water-dropwort, lesser reedmace, greater tussock sedge, purple small-reed, great water dock, yellow-wort and traveller's-joy.

Thirty species of butterfly have been recorded including white-letter hairstreak, purple hairstreak, silver-washed fritillary and brown argus. Seventeen of the 23 species of dragonfly recorded are known to have bred.

A new visitor centre with shop and café was built in 2016.

In May 2022 a pair of Black-winged Stilts arrived at Potteric Carr and made a nest at Piper Marsh. They were successful in fledging four juveniles which remained until the end of July. It was the first recorded breeding by this species in Yorkshire.

In July 2022 four Polish konik ponies were released at the site to help manage the marshland, preventing it from becoming overgrown and help create habitats for ground-nesting birds.
