= Barn Hill Meadows =

SSSI in the East Riding of Yorkshire, England

- Site of Special Scientific Interest
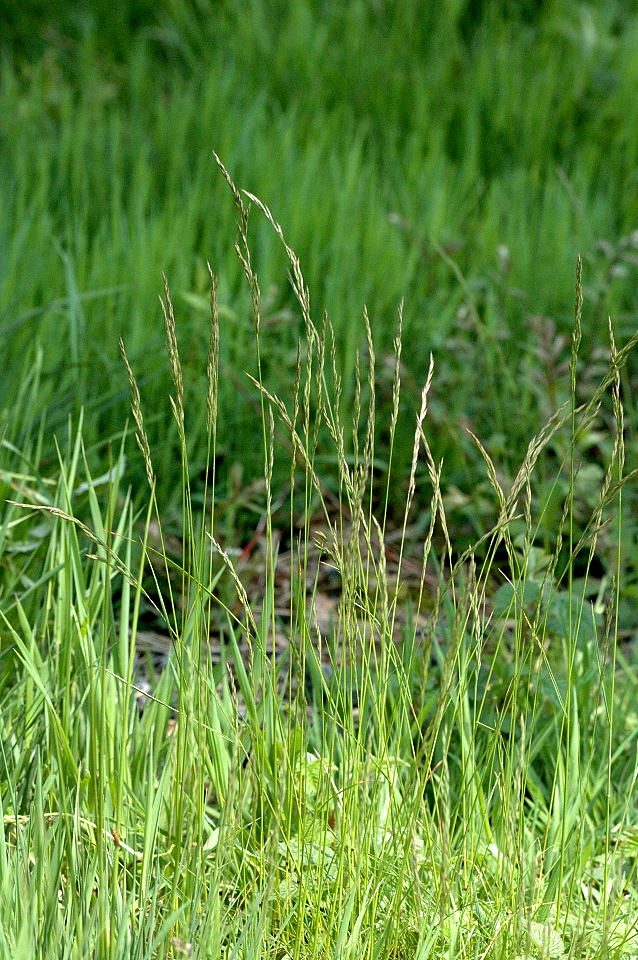
- Red fescue grass dominant on the site

- Shown within the East Riding of Yorkshire
- Location of Barn Hill Meadows.
- Area of search: East Riding of Yorkshire
- Grid reference: SE728286
- Coordinates: 53.749139°N 0.896754°W
- Interest: Biological
- Area: 8.6 acres (0.035 km^{2}; 0.0134 sq mi)
- Notification date: 1987

Barn Hill Meadows is a Site of Special Scientific Interest (SSSI) in the East Riding of Yorkshire, England. It is located to the west of the town of Howden. The site, which was designated a SSSI in 1987, lies on the flood plain of the Old Derwent river. The site is important for its herb-rich, unimproved, neutral grassland. Several of the fields have been traditionally managed for hay and some retain remnant ridge and furrow features. The dominant grasses are red fescue and sweet vernal-grass. There is also an abundance of great burnet, pepper saxifrage and meadow cranes bill.

== See also ==
- List of Sites of Special Scientific Interest in the East Riding of Yorkshire
