= Listed buildings in Billingley =

Civil parish in South Yorkshire

Billingley is a civil parish in the metropolitan borough of Barnsley, South Yorkshire, England. The parish contains three listed buildings that are recorded in the National Heritage List for England. All the listed buildings are designated at Grade II, the lowest of the three grades, which is applied to "buildings of national importance and special interest". The parish contains the village of Billingley and the surrounding area. All the listed buildings are houses in the village.

== Buildings ==
Name and location	Photograph	Date	Notes
Manor House; 53.53750°N 1.33961°W	—	Late 16th or early 17th century	The oldest part of the house is the rear wing, with the main range added in the early 19th century. The rear wing is partly timber framed, and the rest of the house is in sandstone on a plinth, with quoins, and a Welsh slate roof. There are two storeys and an L-shaped plan, with a main range of four bays, and a rear wing. The doorway has a quoined surround, and a keystone cut into the lintel. The windows are casements, with the lintels cut to resemble voussoirs. Inside, there is some exposed timber framing.
Billingley Hall; 53.53690°N 1.33900°W	—	1744	A house that was later extended, it is in sandstone on a plinth, with quoins, bands, paired gutter brackets, and a hipped Welsh slate roof with some stone slate. There are three storeys, three bays, and a two-storey full-length extension at the rear. The central doorway has an architrave, a fanlight, a pulvinated frieze, and a segmental pediment on consoles. The windows are sashes in architraves, and in the right return is a tall stair window.
Poplar Farmhouse; 53.53772°N 1.34086°W	—	Mid 18th century	The farmhouse is in sandstone, with quoins, and a roof of stone slate with tiles at the rear and coped gables. There are two storeys and three bays. On the front is a glazed porch, and the windows are mullioned with casements.
