= Burton Bushes =

Protected area in the East Riding of Yorkshire, England

Coordinates: 53.840140°N 0.46652856°W

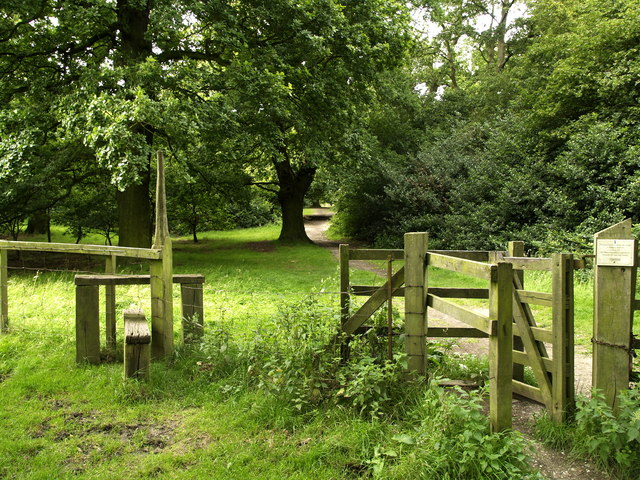
Footpath through Burton Bushes

Burton Bushes is a woodland in the East Riding of Yorkshire that is designated as a Site of Special Scientific Interest (SSSI). The woodland is located 1.2 miles (2 km) west of the town of Beverley and 8.1 miles (13 km) north of the city of Hull and is protected because it is 200 years old. This woodland is situated on Holderness Till - soils that are glacial deposits.

== Biology ==
This woodland is dominated by pedunculate oak trees. Other tree species include downy birch, field maple, wych elm and holly. Herbaceous species include wood anemone, enchanter's nightshade, bluebell and wood sorrel.

== Land ownership ==
All land within Burton Bushes SSSI is owned by the local authority.
