= Dimlington Cliff =

Site of Special Scientific Interest

Coordinates: 53.675986°N 0.10282906°E

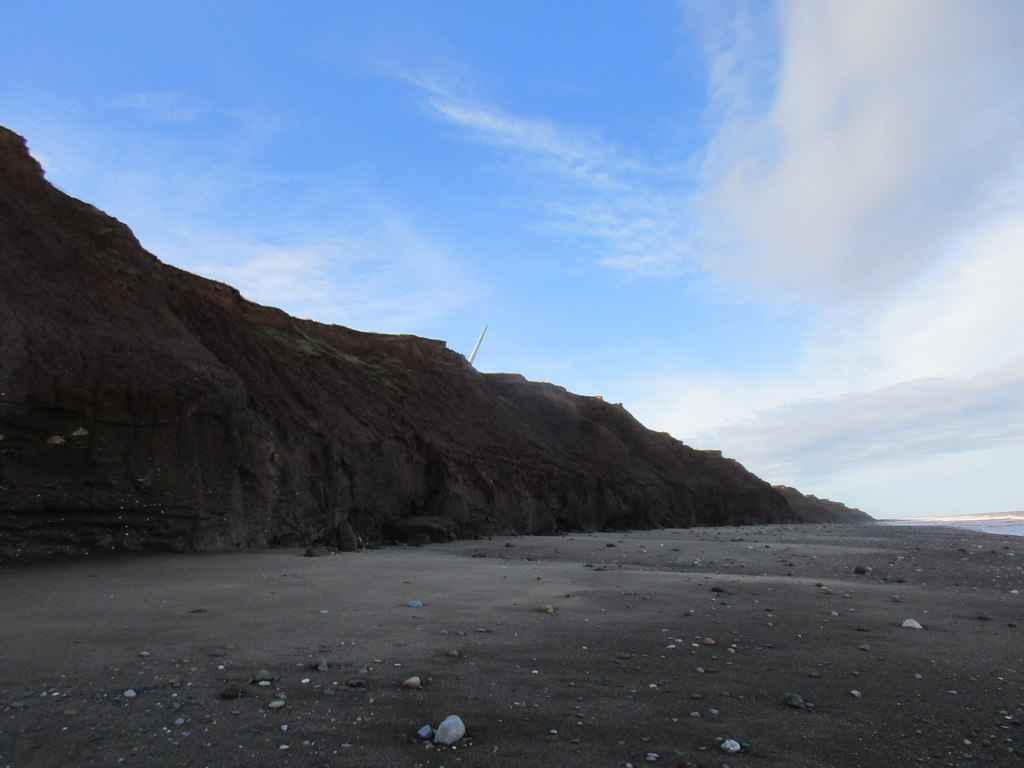
Dimlington Cliff

Dimlington Cliff is a Site of Special Scientific Interest (SSSI) in the East Riding of Yorkshire, England. It is located 6.5km south of the town of Withernsea on the Holderness Coast. This area is protected because of the geological strata from the Quaternary period revealed at these cliffs that gives evidence of the Late Devensian glaciation (Last Glacial Period). This site gives evidence of the former southern margin of the British ice sheet in the North Sea.

== Geology ==
At Dimlington Cliff, basement till from the Quaternary period (including Dimlington Silts) rests on chalk bedrock. Organic deposits within these strata have allowed radiocarbon dating to be applied to this sequence. The Dimlington silts are interpreted as lake deposits, which accumulated prior to the Skipsea Till glacier advance approximately 18,000 years Before Present. The term Dimlington stadial has been applied to date estimates of the Last Glacial Maximum in Britain.

The cliffs at Dimlington High are 30.5 metres high. The tills at Dimlington Cliff contain fossils from the Carboniferous, Jurassic and Cretaceous periods. Cretaceous echinoids include Echinocorys, Micraster, and Galerites. Belemnites include Belelmnitella mucronata. Lower Cretaceous fossils include the Belemnites Hibolites and Acroteuthis and the oyster Exogyra.

Fossils from the Lower Jurassic exposed in limestone boulders here include the ammonites Dactylioceras commune (genus Dactylioceras), Hildoceras bifrons and fossils from the genera Arnioceras and Peronoceras. Other fossils found here include bivalve fossils from the genera Gryphaea and Cardinia, brachiopods from the genus Productus and the coral genus Lithostrotion.

A wide variety of glacial erratic rocks are scattered along the foreshore including some from the Pennines, Lake District, Scotland, the Scottish Borders and Scandinavia.

== Land ownership ==
All land within Dimlington Cliff SSSI is owned by the local authority.
