= Allerthorpe Common =

Nature reserve and SSSI in the East Riding of Yorkshire, England

- Site of Special Scientific Interest
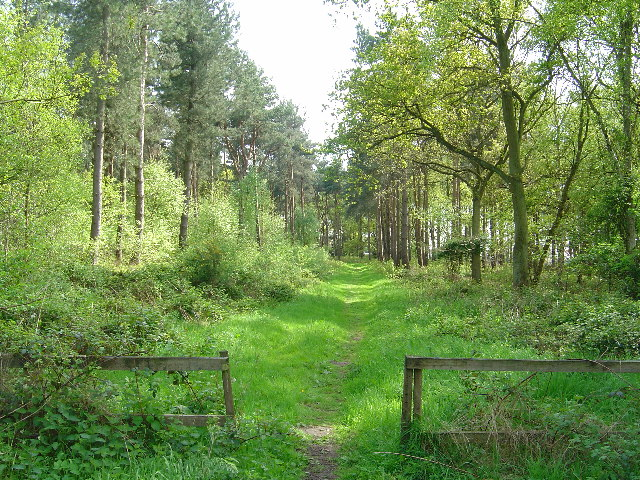
- Western entrance to Allerthorpe Common

- Shown within the East Riding of Yorkshire
- Location of Allerthorpe Common.
- Area of search: East Riding of Yorkshire
- Grid reference: SE761475
- Coordinates: 53.918504°N 0.842049°W
- Interest: Biological
- Area: 22.6 acres (0.091 km^{2}; 0.0353 sq mi)
- Notification date: 1951

Allerthorpe Common is a Site of Special Scientific Interest (SSSI) and nature reserve in the East Riding of Yorkshire, England. It is located close to the town of Pocklington.

== History ==
Allerthorpe was mentioned in the Domesday Book AD 1086 as "Aluuarstorp", a name meaning a "thorpe" or small village belonging to a man called Alfard. Pollen counts have shown that the common has provided habitat for heather and birch, and some pine for at least 2000 years. During Anglo-Saxon times some of the trees were cleared for conversion of the land to pasture. Commoners had a right to graze cattle, cut turves, and use timber and gorse for repairs. At the time of enclosures (1750–1800), the surrounding land was enclosed and used for agriculture. The common became drier as drainage was improved in the surrounding farmland, and in the 1950s, the land was bought by the Forestry Commission. Part was drained and planted in 1963 with Scots pine, Austrian pine and Lodgepole pine. In 1965, a 12.6 hectares (31 acres) area was designated as a Site of Special Scientific Interest and was set aside as a nature reserve as being one of the last tracts of semi-natural grassland in the Vale of York.

== The common ==
The site lies on river and lake sands, which were deposited during the last glacial period 12-10,000 years ago. The soils are acidic and a variety of habitats, including wet and dry heath, mire, grassland and woodland have formed. The drier areas are dominated by heather interspersed with cross-leaved heath and purple moor grass. In the wetter areas purple moor grass forms dense tussocks. Common cottongrass and marsh cinquefoil occur in the wet mire conditions, and the nationally rare marsh gentian grows here. Birds that breed here include the nightjar, tree pipit and whinchat.

== See also ==
- List of Sites of Special Scientific Interest in the East Riding of Yorkshire
