= Bilham Sand Pits =

Coordinates: 53.553967°N 1.264054°W

- Site of Special Scientific Interest
- Location of Bilham Sand Pits.
- Area of search: South Yorkshire
- Grid reference: SE487066
- Interest: Geological
- Area: 0.2 ha (0.49 acres)
- Notification date: 1987
- Location map: Nature on the map

Bilham Sand Pits (grid reference SE487066) is a 0.2 hectare (0.1 acre) geological site of Special Scientific Interest in South Yorkshire. The site was notified in 1987.

== See also ==
- List of Sites of Special Scientific Interest in South Yorkshire
