= Denaby Ings =

Coordinates: 53.4898°N 1.2554°W

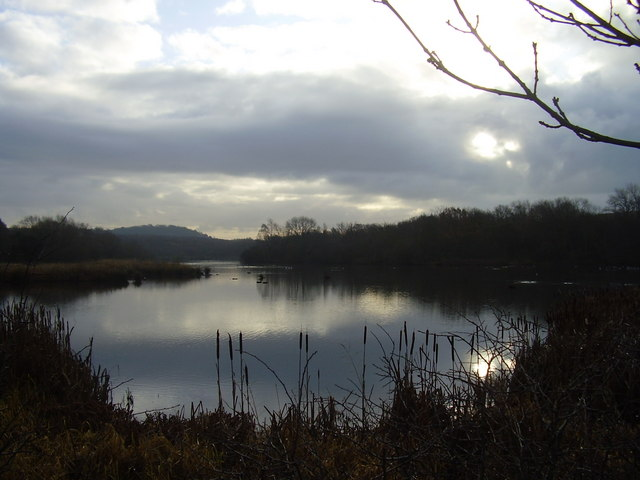

- Location within South Yorkshire
- OS grid reference: SK495995
- Metropolitan borough: Doncaster
- Metropolitan county: South Yorkshire
- Region: Yorkshire and the Humber
- Country: England
- Sovereign state: United Kingdom
- Post town: DONCASTER
- Postcode district: S64
- Police: South Yorkshire
- Fire: South Yorkshire
- Ambulance: Yorkshire
- UK Parliament: Rawmarsh and Conisbrough

Denaby Ings are a nature reserve on the River Dearne, encompassing an area of 23 hectares north of Denaby Main, Doncaster, South Yorkshire, near the town of Mexborough. The Trans Pennine Trail passes here. The habitats include open water, water meadows, woodland scrub and hedgerows. Birdwatching is a popular activity there. The area has been classed as a Site of Special Scientific Interest since 11 August 1983.
