= Yorkshire Wildlife Trust =

Charitable organisation focused on environmental conservation in Yorkshire, England

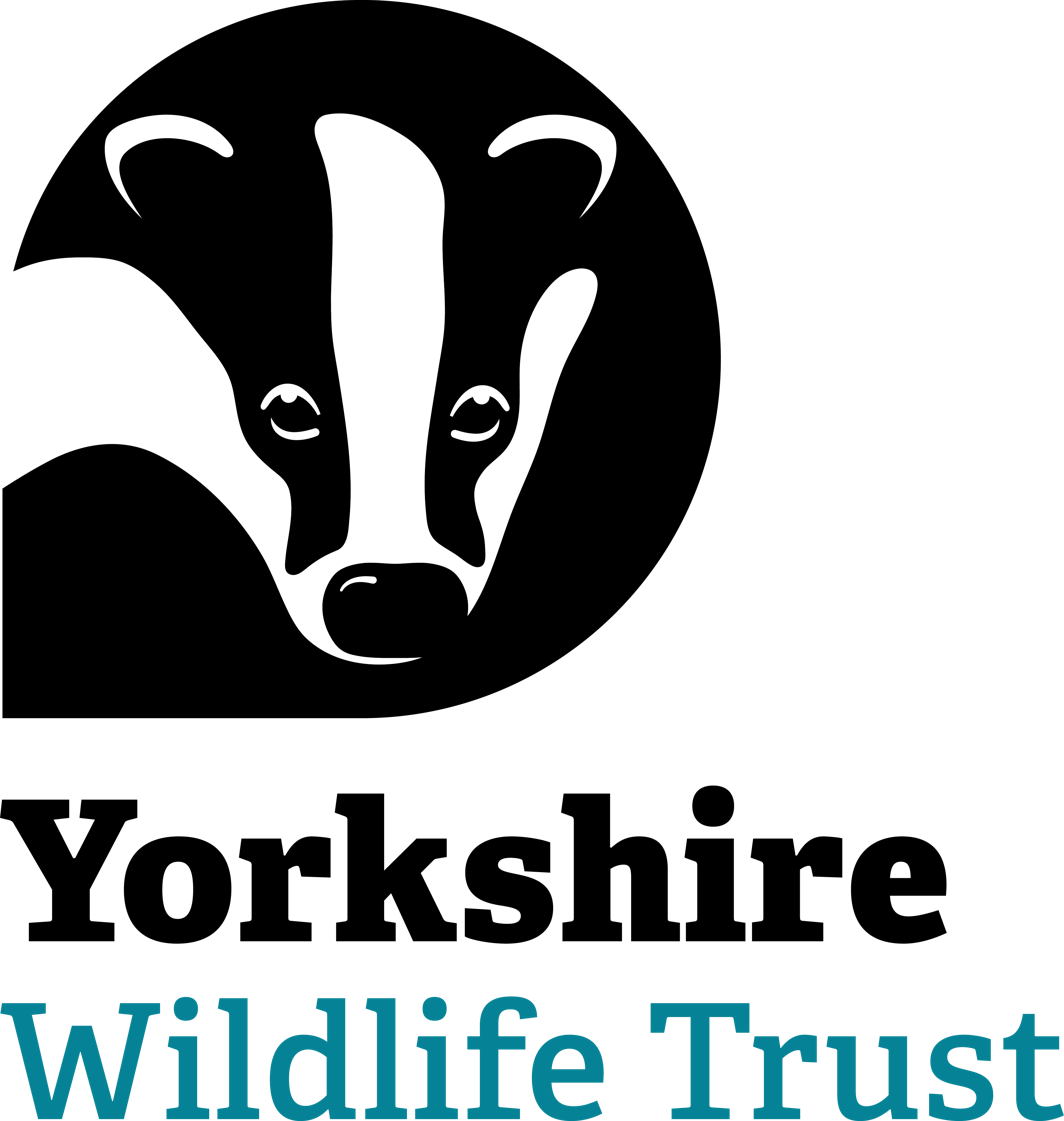
- The logo of Yorkshire Wildlife Trust
- Abbreviation: YWT
- Formation: 1 January 1946; 80 years ago
- Type: Registered charity No.210807
- Legal status: Registered Charity and Company limited by guarantee No.409650
- Headquarters: York
- Location: Yorkshire
- Chief Executive: Rachael Bice
- Affiliations: The Wildlife Trusts partnership
- Budget: £13 million (FY20/21)
- Website: Official website

Yorkshire Wildlife Trust is a charitable non-governmental organisation, one of the UK's 46 county-based Wildlife Trusts. Its focus is nature conservation and it works to achieve a nature-rich Yorkshire with healthy and resilient ecosystems that support both Yorkshire's wildlife and its people.

It works across the ceremonial counties of East, North, South, and West Yorkshire; with the exception of the Sheffield District and some of Rotherham District, where the separate Sheffield and Rotherham Wildlife Trust operates, and the Unitary Authorities of Middlesbrough, Redcar and Cleveland, and Stockton-on-Tees, where the separate Tees Valley Wildlife Trust operates.

The second oldest Wildlife Trust, having been originally formed as the Yorkshire Naturalists Trust in 1946, it is now one of the largest Wildlife Trusts with an income of over £13 million, and over 150 staff. The Trust is a membership organisation and has grown to become one of the largest civil society organisations in Yorkshire, with over 50,000 members spread across the county.

Although originally founded to manage nature reserves; much of the Trust's impact is now achieved by collaborating with and supporting other land owners and land managers to contribute to the recovery of Yorkshire's nature. Of particular note, the Trust is recognised as a world leader in peatland restoration. Having supported land owners to restore over 30,000 hectares of peat across the county since the mid-2000s. The Trust also has a marine conservation programme, with a particular focus on seagrass and oyster restoration in the Humber Estuary.

The Trust also runs an extensive outreach and engagement programme.

== Nature Reserves ==
The Trust was originally created to protect the Trust's first nature reserve, Askham Bog. It now manages over 3,000 hectares of land across over 100 nature reserves. Its most famous and well-visited reserves include Spurn Point, Potteric Carr, Wheldrake Ings, parts of Flamborough Head, and parts of Ingleborough. Many of Yorkshire's, and in some cases England's (SSSIs) and Europe's (Natura 2000) most important sites for biodiversity are now Yorkshire Wildlife Trust Reserves. Most, but not all, of the Trust's reserves have some form of public access, although visitors are encouraged to respect the nature the reserves are there to protect. In particular by avoiding taking dogs on reserves, except reserves where this is explicitly allowed, and only then dogs must be kept on a short lead at all times.

=== North Yorkshire ===
- Ashberry
- Ashes Pasture (part of Wild Ingleborough)
- Askham Bog
- Barlow Common
- Birch Wood
- Bishop Monkton Railway Cutting
- Bolton-on-Swale Lake
- Bolton Percy Station
- Brae Pasture (part of Wild Ingleborough)
- Brockadale
- Burton Leonard Lime Quarries
- Burton Riggs
- Chafer Wood
- Ellerburn Bank
- Fen Bog
- Filey Dams
- Garbutt Wood
- Globe Flower Wood
- Grass Wood
- Harland Mount
- Jeffry Bog
- Leyburn Old Glebe
- Littlebeck Wood
- Moorlands
- Newbiggin Pastures
- Ripon City Wetlands
- Ripon Loop
- Salt Lake Quarry (part of Wild Ingleborough)
- Seata Quarry
- Semer Water
- Sherburn Willows
- South House Pavement (part of Wild Ingleborough)
- Southerscales (part of Wild Ingleborough)
- Staveley
- Strensall Common
- Upper Dunsforth Carr
- Wharram Quarry
- Weldrake Ings
- Yellands Meadow

=== East Riding of Yorkshire ===
- Allerthorpe Common
- Cali Heath
- Flamborough Cliffs
- Hodgson's Fields
- Keldmarsh
- Kilnsea Wetlands
- Kiplingcotes Chalk Pit
- North Cave Wetlands
- North Cliffe Wood
- North Newbald Becksies
- Paull Holme Strays
- Pearson Park Wildlife Garden
- Pulfin Bog
- Rifle Butts Quarry
- Saltmarshe Delph
- Skerne Wetlands
- Snakeholm Pastures
- Spurn
- Welwick Saltmarsh
- Wharram Quarry

=== South Yorkshire ===
- Barnsley Canal – Wilthorpe
- Carlton Marsh
- Dearne Valley Country Park
- Denaby Ings
- Fen Carr
- Hopyard Meadow
- Littleworth Park
- Maltby Low Common
- Potteric Carr
- Sprotborough Flash
- Thorpe Marsh

=== West Yorkshire ===
- Adel Dam
- Broadhead Clough
- Hetchell Wood
- Hollinhurst Wood
- Kippax Meadows
- Kirkstall Valley
- Ledsham Bank
- Ledston Luck
- Letchmire Pastures
- Low Wood
- Owl Wood and Pit Plantation
- Rothwell Country Park
- Rothwell Pastures
- Stirley
- Stocksmoor Common
- Stoneycliffe Wood
- The Lines Way
- Townclose Hills
- Upper Park Wood
- Water Haigh Woodland Park
- Willow Garth
