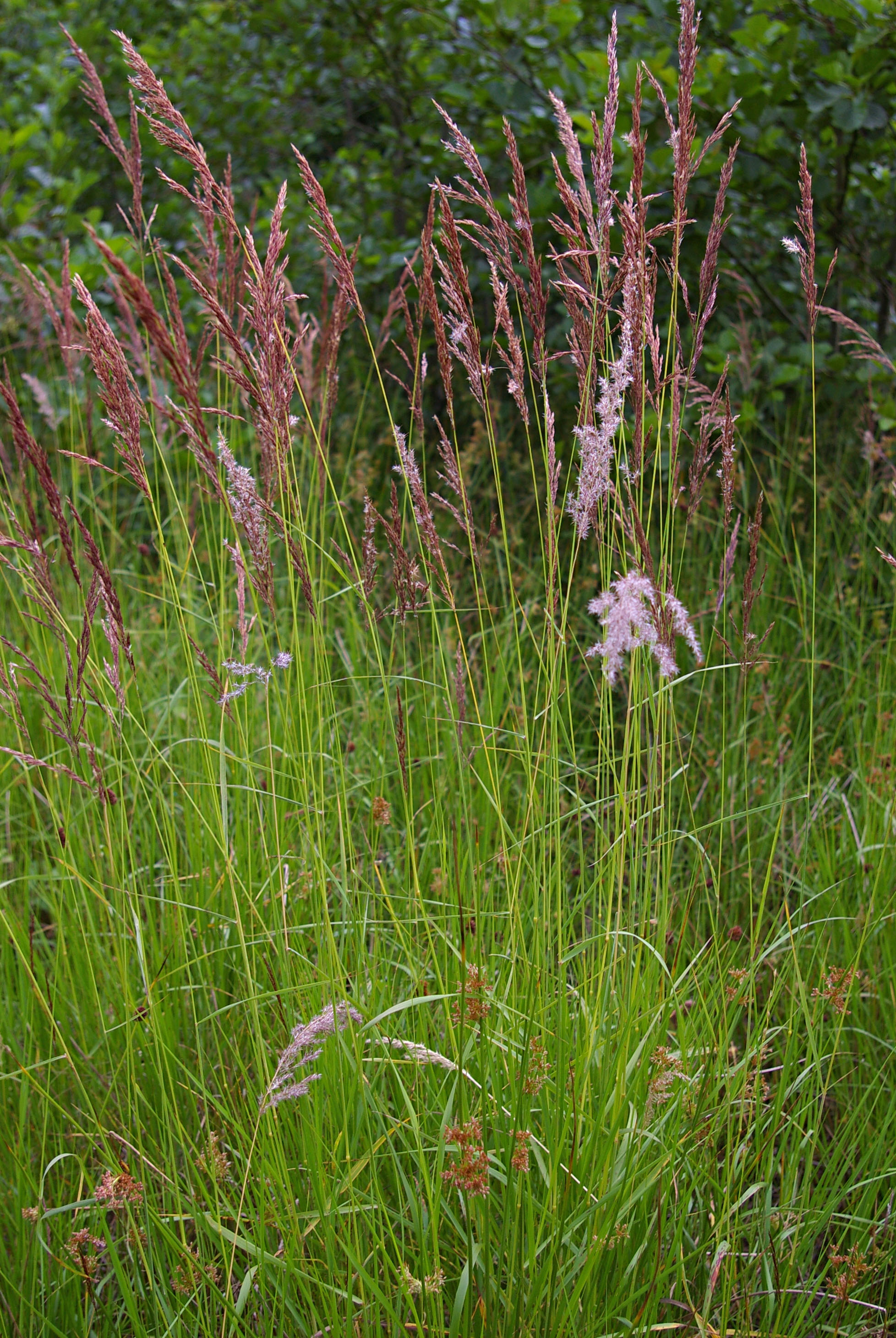

Scientific classification
- Kingdom: Plantae
- Clade: Tracheophytes
- Clade: Angiosperms
- Clade: Monocots
- Clade: Commelinids
- Order: Poales
- Family: Poaceae
- Subfamily: Pooideae
- Genus: Calamagrostis
- Species: C. canescens

Binomial name
- Calamagrostis canescens (Weber ex F.H. Wigg.) Roth

Synonyms
- Achnatherum lanceolatum (Roth) P.Beauv.; Agrostis lanceolata (Roth) Roem. & Schult.; Agrostis ramosa (Host) Roem. & Schult.; Arundo calamagrostis L.; Arundo canescens Weber; Arundo gracilis Schumach.; Arundo leersii Koch; Arundo lithuanica Schult. & Schult.f.; Arundo ramosa Schult.; Arundo riparia Willd. ex Steud.; Arundo schleicheriana Besser; Arundo vilnensis Schult. & Schult.f.; Athernotus lanceolatus (Roth) Dulac; Calamagrostis calamagrostis (L.) H.Karst.; Calamagrostis gaudiniana Rchb.; Calamagrostis gracilescens (Blytt) Blytt; Calamagrostis lanceolata Roth; Calamagrostis lithuanica Besser; Calamagrostis obscura Downar; Calamagrostis ramosa Host; Calamagrostis schleicheri Besser; Calamagrostis vilnensis Besser

= Calamagrostis canescens =

Species of grass

Calamagrostis canescens, known as purple small-reed, is a species of grass in the family Poaceae, native to Europe and western Siberia.
