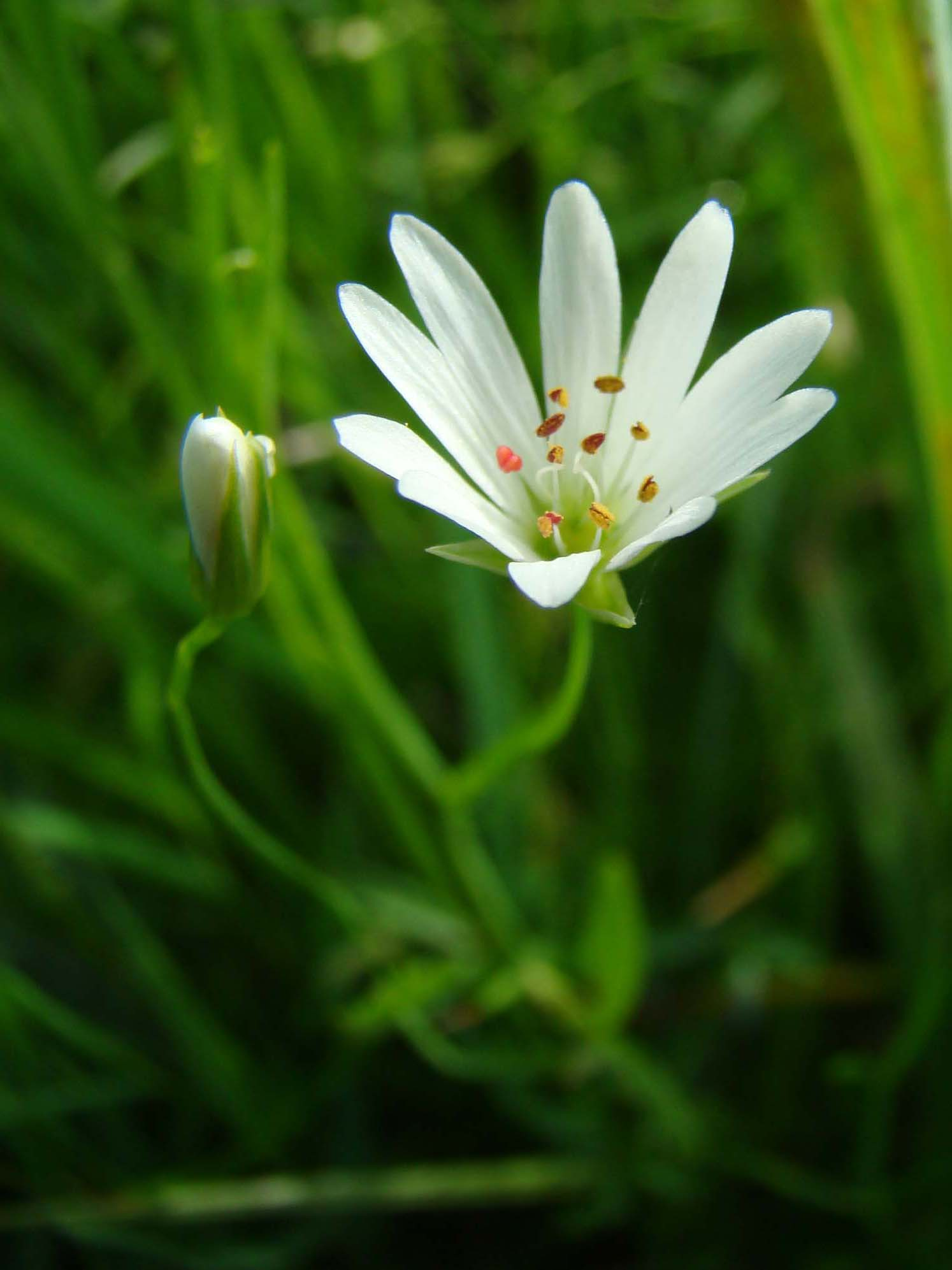

Scientific classification
- Kingdom: Plantae
- Clade: Tracheophytes
- Clade: Angiosperms
- Clade: Eudicots
- Order: Caryophyllales
- Family: Caryophyllaceae
- Genus: Stellaria
- Species: S. palustris

Binomial name
- Stellaria palustris Ehrh. ex Hoffm.

= Stellaria palustris =

Species of flowering plant

Stellaria palustris, commonly known as marsh stitchwort, is a species of flowering plant belonging to the family Caryophyllaceae. It was first described in 1791.

Its native range is Temperate Eurasia.
