= Keadby Bridge =

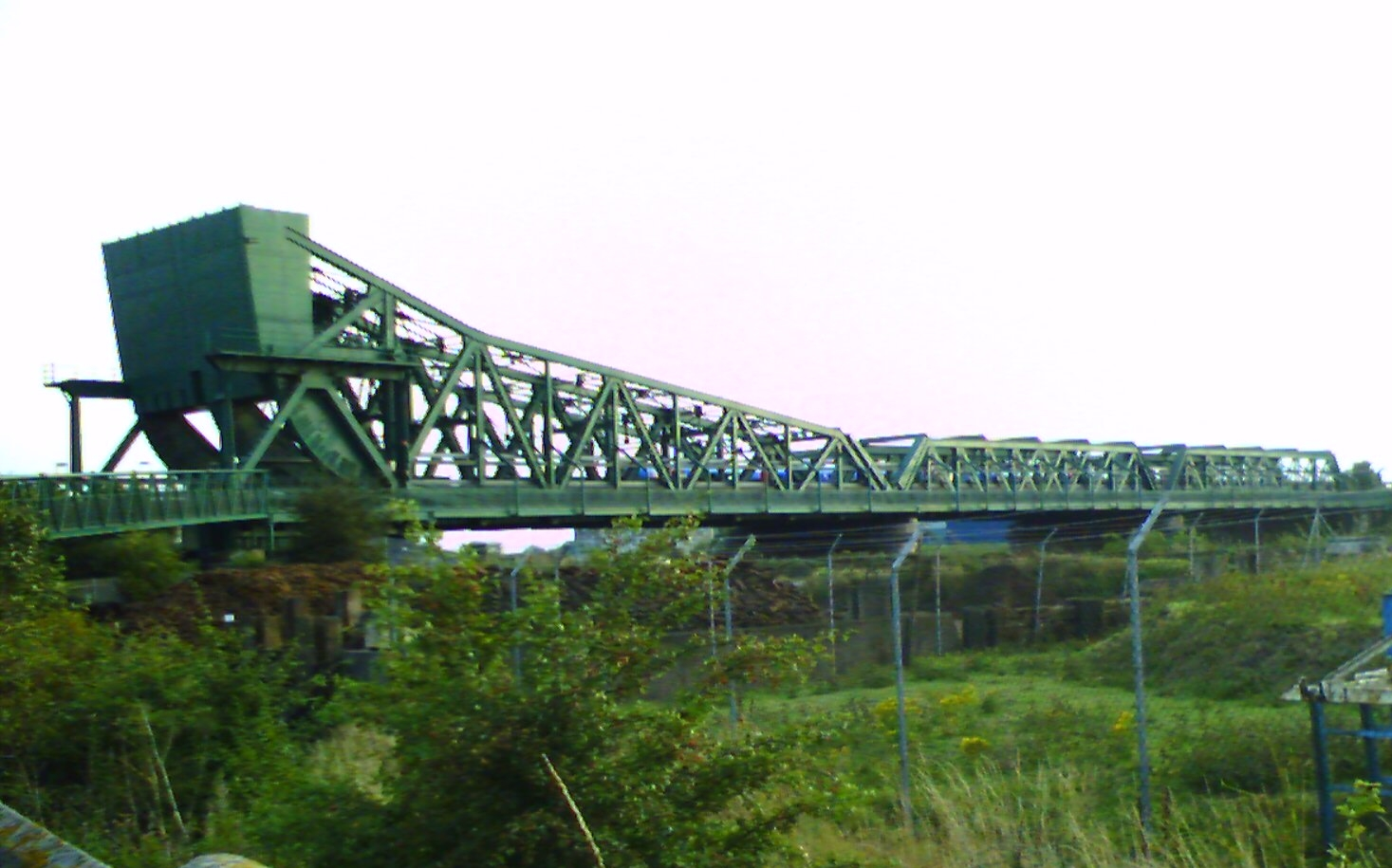
- Keadby Bridge
- Coordinates: 53.5857°N 0.7311°W
- Crosses: River Trent
- Other name: King George V Bridge
- Heritage status: Grade II listed structure

Characteristics
- Total length: 548 feet (167 m)
- Longest span: 150 feet (46 m)

History
- Opened: 1916

Location
- Interactive map of Keadby Bridge

Keadby Bridge, more formally known as the King George V Bridge, crosses the River Trent near Althorpe and Keadby in Lincolnshire, England. It was designed by Alfred Charles Gardner FRSE MIME.

== History ==
The Scherzer rolling lift bridge carries both road and rail traffic across the River Trent. It was built between 1912 and 1916 by the Great Central Railway to replace a previous swing bridge built by the South Yorkshire Railway and opened in 1864. It carries a double track railway line on the southern side, and the two-lane, single carriageway A18 road on the north side.

The Lincolnshire Echo reported that the first passenger train to cross the new bridge left Althorpe Station at 10:35am on 21 May 1916. The train was driven by Herbert Duke of Mexborough and, on the invitation of Sir Sam Fay, Joshua Slowen of Barnetby, who had driven the first passenger train across the old bridge, rode on the engine.

Its 50-metre (163 ft) electrically powered bascule (lifting span) was one of the first of its type in Britain and, when built, was the largest in Europe. Designed by James Ball and C A Rowlandson and built by contractors Sir William Arrol & Co., it has three main spans and two approach spans. The eastern main span was the one that lifted. The Scherzer bascule rolled and rotated on counterbalance. It was electrically powered, originally by a large storage battery fed by petrol-driven generators housed in the engine room beneath the east approach span. This was later modified to mains electricity.

The bridge was controlled from a wooden signal cabin, mounted by the north-east side of the lifting (east) span. The cabin was equipped with a 28-lever frame of British Pneumatic Railway Signal Company design.

The bridge has not been lifted since 1956. In 1960, it was widened and the headroom increased, and the bascule was fixed in position. At the same time, the signal cabin was removed from the bridge structure and the tracks on the railway were fixed in place.

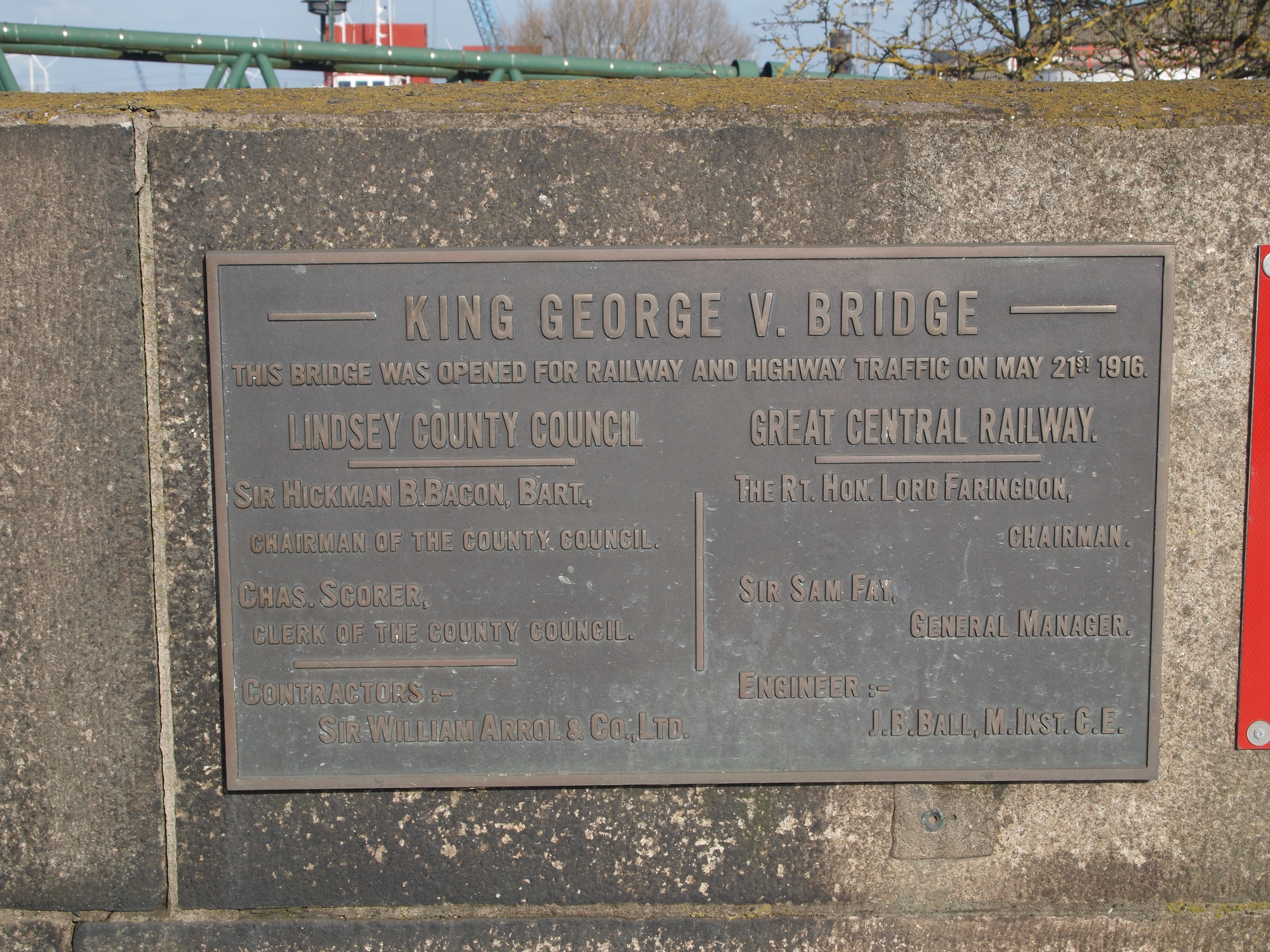
Plaque on Keadby Lifting Bridge regarding its opening on 21 May 1916

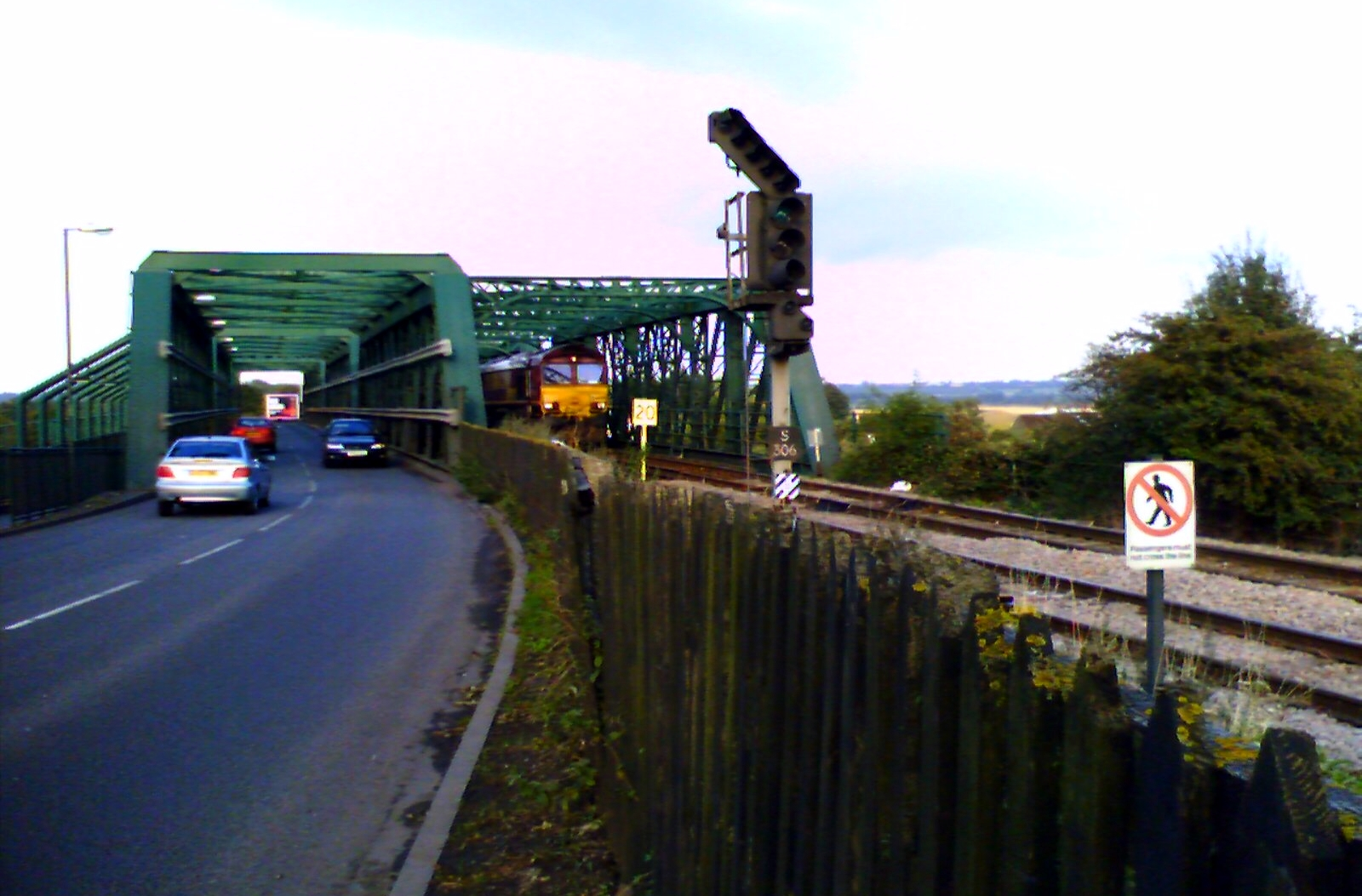
Keadby Bridge, from Althorpe Railway Station

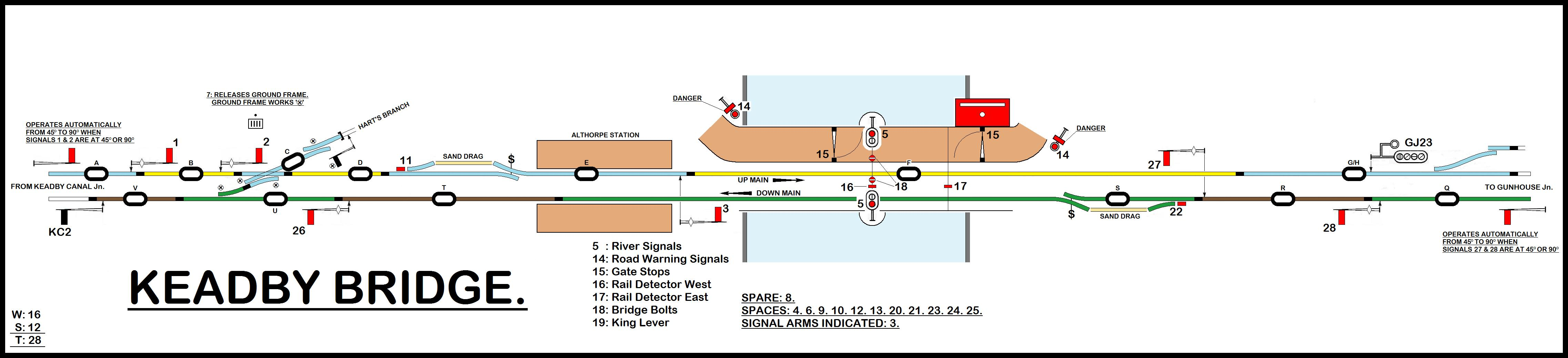
Signalling diagram of the former bridge signal box

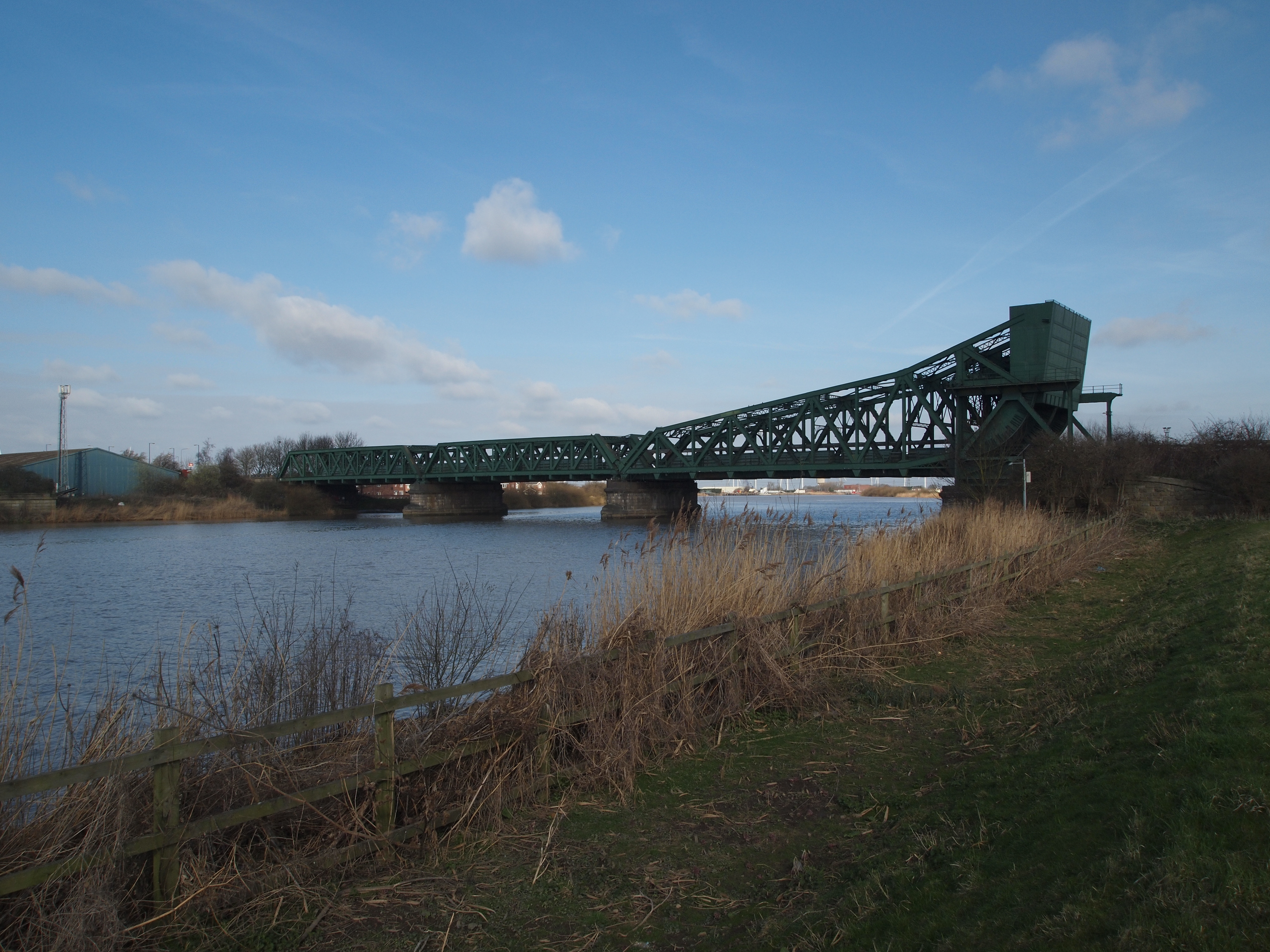
Keadby Bridge from upstream east bank

== See also ==
- List of crossings of the River Trent

Next crossing upstream	River Trent	Next crossing downstream
M180 motorway	Keadby Bridge; Grid reference SE840106	None
