= List of shipwrecks in April 1871 =

The list of shipwrecks in April 1871 includes ships sunk, foundered, grounded, or otherwise lost during April 1871.

== 1 April ==
List of shipwrecks: 1 April 1871
Ship	State	Description
Eglantine	United Kingdom	The barque was wrecked on the Haisborough Sands, in the North Sea off the coast of Norfolk with the loss of all but two of her crew. She was on a voyage from South Shields, County Durham to the West Indies.
Illimani	United Kingdom	The barque was wrecked on "Staten Island", Cape Colony. Her crew were rescued.
Tynemouth Castle	United Kingdom	The steamship ran ashore 35 nautical miles (65 km) west of the entrance to the Bosphorus. She was on a voyage from Odesa, Russia to a British port. Tynemouth Castle was refloated but had to be beached. Although declared a total loss, She was refloated and taken in to Beicos Bay.
Unnamed	United Kingdom	The fishing vessel capsized and sank off Eastbourne, Sussex with the loss of one of her two crew.

== 2 April ==
List of shipwrecks: 2 April 1871
Ship	State	Description
A. F. Lindberg	United States	The fishing schooner was lost in a gale on the Georges Bank. All 11 crew were killed.
B. K. Hough	United States	The fishing schooner was lost in a gale on the Georges Bank. All 11 crew were killed.
Seaman's Pride	United States	The fishing schooner lost on the Georges Bank in a gale. All 10 crew were killed.
William Murray	United States	The fishing schooner was lost in a gale on the Georges Bank. All 11 crew were killed.

== 3 April ==
List of shipwrecks: 3 April 1871
Ship	State	Description
Apphia	United Kingdom	The ship departed from Gonaïves, Haiti for Falmouth, Cornwall. No further trace, presumed foundered with the loss of all hands.
Exley	United Kingdom	The ship was wrecked near Fishguard, Pembrokeshire. Her crew were rescued.
Hooghly	United Kingdom	The ship ran aground in the Hooghly River. She was on a voyage from Calcutta, India to London. She was refloated and put back to Calcutta.
Mentana	France	The ship capsized at Cardiff, Glamorgan, United Kingdom.
Pierre Arsène	France	The ship was wrecked at Saint-Vaast-la-Hougue, Manche.
Scotland	United Kingdom	The steamship ran aground in the Hooghly River. She was on a voyage from Calcutta to London. She was refloated with assistance the next day and resumed her voyage.
Seaton	United Kingdom	The brig was driven ashore at Southend, Essex. She was on a voyage from London to Dunkirk, Nord, France. She was refloated with the assistance of a tug.

== 4 April ==
List of shipwrecks: 4 April 1871
Ship	State	Description
Albania	United Kingdom	The barque was sighted in the Atlantic Ocean (50°11′N 15°58′W) whilst on a voyage from Dundee, Forfarshire to the West Indies. No further trace, presumed foundered with the loss of all hands.
Amazone	United Kingdom	The barque was driven ashore at Bremen, Germany.
Borrowdale	United Kingdom	The brig foundered off the Smalls Lighthouse, Cornwall, according to a message in a bottle which washed up at Great Yarmouth, Norfolk on 8 May.
British Workman	United Kingdom	The ship ran aground. She was refloated and taken in to Brouwershaven, Zeeland, Netherlands in a leaky condition.

== 5 April ==
List of shipwrecks: 5 April 1871
Ship	State	Description
Catharina	Netherlands	The galiot was driven ashore at Cowes, Isle of Wight, United Kingdom. She was on a voyage from Shoreham-by-Sea, Sussex to Liverpool, Lancashire, United Kingdom. She was refloated with assistance and taken in to Cowes.
Charlotte	New Zealand	The cutter ran aground and was wrecked at Tahaenui Beach, near Nūhaka, New Zealand.
Jane	New Zealand	The 19-ton ketch was wrecked at Kemp Point, near Cape Jackson in New Zealand's Marlborough Sounds.
Jason	Netherlands	The full-rigged ship ran aground in the Hillegat. She was on a voyage from Batavia, Netherlands East Indies to Rotterdam, South Holland.
Precursor	United Kingdom	The ship departed from Buenos Aires, Argentina for Iquique, Chile. No further trace, presumed foundered with the loss of all hands.
Rose	United Kingdom	The ship ran aground on the Pennington Spit, off the coast of Hampshire. She was on a voyage from Lymington, Hampshire to Cardiff, Glamorgan. She was refloated and resumed her voyage.

== 6 April ==
List of shipwrecks: 6 April 1871
Ship	State	Description
Blandina	United Kingdom	The ship foundered in the Atlantic Ocean. Her crew were rescued. She was on a voyage from London to Boston, Massachusetts, United States.
British Lion, and Clifford	Canada; United Kingdom	British Lion collided with Clifford and sank in the English Channel off Beachy Head, Sussex, United Kingdom. Her crew were rescued. She was on a voyage from Antwerp, Belgium to Montreal, Quebec. Clifford was on a voyage from Calcutta, India to Dundee, Forfarshire. She put in to Portsmouth, Hampshire in a severely damaged and leaky condition.
Dan	United Kingdom	The schooner was wrecked at Agger, Denmark. She was on a voyage from Arendal, Norway ton Stockton-on-Tees, County Durham.
Merrie England	United Kingdom	The ship was abandoned in the Pacific Ocean. Her crew were rescued by a French barque.
Narval	French Navy	The Narval-class aviso ran aground on the Goodwin Sands, Kent, United Kingdom. She was refloated with assistance from Atalante (French Navy) two tugs and several luggers (all United Kingdom).
Times	United Kingdom	The sloop was driven ashore at Dundee, Forfarshire. She was on a voyage from Dundee to South Shields, County Durham.
Young John	United Kingdom	The ship sank in the River Trent near the Keadby Bridge. She was on a voyage from Gainsborough, Lincolnshire to Newcastle upon Tyne, Northumberland.

== 7 April ==
List of shipwrecks: 7 April 1871
Ship	State	Description
Bella Donna	United Kingdom	The ship foundered in the Atlantic Ocean. Her crew took to a boat; they were rescued two days later by Bridgewater (United Kingdom). Bella Donna was on a voyage from Baltimore, Maryland, United States to Londonderry.
Young Eagle	United States	The barque was abandoned in the Atlantic Ocean. Her crew were rescued. She was on a voyage from New Orleans, Louisiana to Liverpool, Lancashire, United Kingdom.

== 8 April ==
List of shipwrecks: 8 April 1871
Ship	State	Description
Catharina	United Kingdom	The ship sprang a leak and was beached at Bembridge, Isle of Wight. She was on a voyage from Shoreham-by-Sea, Sussex to Liverpool, Lancashire. She was refloated and towed in to Cowes, Isle of Wight in a severely leaky condition.
Malabar	Germany	The ship departed from Philadelphia, Pennsylvania, United States for London, United Kingdom. No further trace, presumed foundered with the loss of all hands.
S. R. Watson	United States	The tug capsized and sank at Chicago, Illinois with the loss of four of her six crew.

== 9 April ==
List of shipwrecks: 9 April 1871
Ship	State	Description
Freya	Sweden	The barque was abandoned off the coast of the Newfoundland Colony (41°04′N 60°20′W). Her crew were rescued by the steamship Iowa (United Kingdom). Freya was on a voyage from New York, United States to Kronstadt, Russia. She was towed back to New York by Iowa.
Illimani	United Kingdom	The barque foundered in the Atlantic Ocean. Her crew were rescued by the barque Titan (Germany). Illimani was on a voyage from Liverpool, Lancashire to Portland, Oregon, United States.

== 10 April ==
List of shipwrecks: 10 April 1871
Ship	State	Description
Courier	United Kingdom	The ship was driven ashore and wrecked on Pico Island, Azores. She was on a voyage from Benin City, Africa to Liverpool, Lancashire.
Dale	United Kingdom	The steamship ran aground near Brouwershaven, Zeeland, Netherlands. She was on a voyage from Memel, Germany to Rotterdam, South Holland, Netherlands. She was refloated on 13 April and taken in to Rotterdam.
Earl of Devon	United Kingdom	The ship ran aground in the River Dee and was severely damaged. She was on a voyage from Plymouth, Devon to Saltney, Cheshire.
Ida E.	Canada	The brig was abandoned at sea. Her crew were rescued by Jenny Berteaux (France). Ida E. was on a voyage from St. Martins to Lockport, New York, United States.

== 11 April ==
List of shipwrecks: 11 April 1871
Ship	State	Description
Aios Georgios	Greece	The ship collided with another vessel and sank in the Mediterranean Sea. Her crew were rescued.
H. F. Eaton	United Kingdom	The ship was abandoned in the Atlantic Ocean. Her crew were rescued by Cuerero (Argentina). H. F. Eaton was on a voyage from Middlesbrough, Yorkshire to Baltimore, Maryland, United States.
Laura	Germany	The ship was driven ashore north of Vindava Courland Governorate.

== 13 April ==
List of shipwrecks: 13 April 1871
Ship	State	Description
Coronation	United Kingdom	The schooner collided with the steamship Firth (United Kingdom) and sank with the loss of her captain. Four crew were rescued by Firth. Coronation was on a voyage from Seaham, County Durham to Ipswich, Suffolk.
Unnamed	Cwm Avon	The schooner was wrecked at Rhoscolyn, Anglesey.
Deodata	Norway	The ship was wrecked at Memel, Germany. Her crew were rescued. She was on a voyage from Torrevieja, Spain to Memel.
Valdarno	United Kingdom	The barque was driven ashore and wrecked at Rhoscolyn with the loss of four of her crew. She was on a voyage from Matanzas, Cuba to the Clyde.
Vixen	United Kingdom	The schooner was driven ashore and wrecked at "Crigill", 12 nautical miles (22 km) from Holyhead, Anglesey. Her crew were rescued. She was on a voyage from Woodbridge, Suffolk to Liverpool, Lancashire.

== 14 April ==
List of shipwrecks: 14 April 1871
Ship	State	Description
Conqueror	United Kingdom	The ship was driven ashore at Cork Head, County Cork. She was on a voyage from San Francisco, California to Liverpool, Lancashire.
Harker Brothers	United Kingdom	The barque was driven ashore and wrecked at Cork Head. Her crew were rescued. She was on a voyage from Belize City, British Honduras to Liverpool.
Queen of Clippers	United Kingdom	The schooner was driven ashore at Overstrand, Norfolk. She was refloated on 17 April and resumed her voyage.

== 15 April ==
List of shipwrecks: 15 April 1871
Ship	State	Description
Aarhus	Denmark	The steamship was driven ashore near "Elfsborg". She was later refloated.
Sapphire	United Kingdom	The steamship ran aground on Alligator's Reef.

== 16 April ==
List of shipwrecks: 16 April 1871
Ship	State	Description
County of Ayr	United Kingdom	The full-rigged ship was driven ashore near Brouwershaven, Zeeland, Netherlands. She was on a voyage from "Pasarœang", Netherlands East Indies to Hellevoetsluis, Zeeland.
Gertrude	Germany	The ship was driven ashore and wrecked near "Steensort". She was on a voyage from Swansea, Glamorgan, United Kingdom to Riga, Russian Empire. She was consequently condemned.
Matanzas	United Kingdom	The ship foundered in the Atlantic Ocean. Her crew were rescued by Adele and Marie (France). Matanzas was on a voyage from South Shields, County Durham to Cartagena, Spain.
Victoria	United Kingdom	The ship was wrecked near Kristianopel, Sweden. She was on a voyage from Påskallavik, Sweden to Copenhagen, Denmark.

== 17 April ==
List of shipwrecks: April 1871
Ship	State	Description
Amity	United Kingdom	The Thames barge was run ashore in a sinking condition at Walton-on-the-Naze, Essex. She was on a voyage from London to Colchester, Essex.
Caroline, and Virgo	United Kingdom	The fishing boat Caroline and the schooner Virgo collided. Caroline sank. Virgo was on a voyage from King's Lynn, Norfolk to Newcastle upon Tyne, Northumberland. She put back to King's Lynn and was beached.
Cleopatra	Italy	The steamship was holed by an anchor and sank at Livorno.
Eliza Everett	United Kingdom	The ship struck rocks and was damaged. She was on a voyage from Ardrossan, Ayrshire to Philadelphia, Pennsylvania, United States. She was refloated and put in to the Clyde.
HMS Immortalité	Royal Navy	The Emerald-class frigate ran aground at Greenwich, Jamaica. She was on a voyage from Kingston to Port Royal. She was refloated on 19 April with assistance from HMS Cadmus and HMS Volage (both Royal Navy).
Leonore	Germany	The ship ran aground on the Kentish Knock. She was on a voyage from Bremerhaven to Trinidad de Cuba, Cuba. She was refloated and taken in to Harwich, Essex in a leaky condition.
Mennettha	Flag unknown	The ship foundered. She was on a voyage from Livorno, Italy to Dordrecht, South Holland, Netherlands.
Racklam	Germany	The schooner was driven ashore at North Berwick, Lothian, United Kingdom.
Sea Flower	United Kingdom	The ship collided with a steamship and sank off the Mull of Galloway, Wigtownshire. Her crew were rescued. She was on a voyage from Maryport, Cumberland to Belfast, County Antrim.

== 18 April ==
List of shipwrecks: 18 April 1871
Ship	State	Description
Felix Estivant	France	The barque was driven ashore at Ardrossan, Ayrshire, United Kingdom. She was refloated.
Gallino and Bonsignore	Italy	The ship was driven ashore at the North Foreland, Kent, United Kingdom. She was on a voyage from Callao, Peru to Antwerp, Belgium. She was refloated the next day and taken in to Ramsgate, Kent.
Huydecoker	Netherlands	The ship ran aground in the Hellegat. She was on a voyage from Brouwershaven to Hellevoetsluis, Zeeland.
Stella Maris	Canada	The schooner was driven ashore and wrecked near Liverpool, Nova Scotia.

== 19 April ==
List of shipwrecks: 19 April 1871
Ship	State	Description
Mary Stewart	United Kingdom	The ship was driven ashore and wrecked on Inishbofin, County Donegal. She was on a voyage from Letterkenny, County Donegal to Galway.
Nimble	United Kingdom	The brig ran aground at Santos, Brazil. She was on a voyage from Santos to Sombrero, Anguilla.
Pearl	United Kingdom	The smack struck the Chicken Rock and was abandoned. Her crew were rescued. She was on a voyage from Runcorn, Cheshire to Letterkenny, County Donegal.
Royal Arthur	United Kingdom	The ship was driven ashore and wrecked at the Hook Lighthouse, County Wexford. Her crew were rescued. She was on a voyage from San Francisco, California, United States to Liverpool, Lancashire.
Tropic	United Kingdom	The barque foundered 60 nautical miles (110 km) off the Scottish coast. She was on a voyage from Newcastle upon Tyne, Northumberland to a Spanish port.
Zulmira	United Kingdom	The barque was driven ashore at Castletown, Isle of Man. She was on a voyage from Pernambuco, Brazil to Liverpool, Lancashire.

== 20 April ==
List of shipwrecks: 20 April 1871
Ship	State	Description
Alexandria	Denmark	The schooner struck the Mackintosh Rock, in the Firth of Clyde and sank. Her crew were rescued. She was refloated on 26 May.
Alster	United Kingdom	The ship ran aground on the Lemon and Ower Sands. Her crew were got aboard the Lemon and Ower Lightship ( Trinity House). Alster was on a voyage from Sunderland, County Durham to the Nieuwe Diep. She floated off the next day and sank.
Amelia	United Kingdom	The barque was driven ashore at "Kilroom". She was on a voyage from Troon, Ayrshire to Dublin. She was refloated and towed in to Belfast, County Antrim.
Brenda	United Kingdom	The ship was driven ashore near Longhope, Orkney Islands.
Cornish Diamond	United Kingdom	The schooner was wrecked on the Mixon Shoal in the Bristol Channel with the loss of two of her crew.
Hammond	United Kingdom	The ship was driven ashore and wrecked at Killard Point, County Down. She was on a voyage from Belfast, County Antrim to Maryport, Cumberland.
Jane	United Kingdom	The brigantine ran aground on the Barber Sand, in the North Sea off the coast of Norfolk. She was refloated and resumed her voyage.
Janet	United Kingdom	The ship ran aground in the Clyde upstream of Bowling, Dunbartonshire. She was on a voyage from "Couran" to Calcutta, India.
Jolund	Norway	The ship was driven ashore and wrecked at North Berwick, Lothian, United Kingdom. Her crew were rescued.
John Spear	United Kingdom	The barque was abandoned in the Atlantic Ocean. Her crew were rescued by Star Queen (United Kingdom). John Spear was on a voyage from Pensacola, Florida to Hartlepool, County Durham.
Mary	United Kingdom	The schooner sank in the River Tywi. She was on a voyage from Carmarthen to Liverpool, Lancashire. She was refloated on 22 May.
Merrimac	United States	The ship collided with the steamship Aleppo (United Kingdom) 100 nautical miles (190 km) off Boston, Massachusetts and was abandoned, presumed to have sunk. Her crew were rescued by Aleppo. Merrimac was on a voyage from Colonia del Sacramento, Uruguay to Boston.
Trioner	Norway	The brig was driven ashore at Macduff, Aberdeenshire, United Kingdom. Her nine crew were rescued by the Banff Lifeboat. She was on a voyage from Newcastle upon Tyne, Northumberland to Westervik.

== 21 April ==
List of shipwrecks: 21 April 1871
Ship	State	Description
Camilla	United Kingdom	The ship foundered in the Atlantic Ocean (44°27′N 8°26′W). Her twelve crew were rescued by J. B. Gray (United Kingdom). Camilla was on a voyage from Newcastle upon Tyne, Northumberland to Trieste.
Janet Cowas	United Kingdom	The ship ran aground at Liverpool, Lancashire. She was on a voyage from Liverpool to Calcutta, India. She was refloated.
Samuel E. Sawyer	United States	The schooner was lost at Sandy Hook,Magdalen Islands. Crew saved.

== 22 April ==
List of shipwrecks: 22 April 1871
Ship	State	Description
Blanche	United Kingdom	The barque ran aground on the Kaloot Sand.
Gothen	United Kingdom	The ship was abandoned in the Atlantic Ocean. Her crew were rescued. She was on a voyage from Philadelphia, Pennsylvania, United States to the Kingroad.
Halyma	United Kingdom	The steamship collided with the steamship Agnes Jack (United Kingdom) and sank 20 nautical miles (37 km) off Ouessant, Finistère, France. Her crew were rescued by Agnes Jack. Halyma was on a voyage from Saint-Nazaire, Ille-et-Vilaine, France to Sunderland, County Durham.
Pole Star	United Kingdom	The ship ran aground in the River Mersey at Bootle, Lancashire. She was on a voyage from Valparaíso, Chile to Liverpool, Lancashire. She was refloated and put in to Birkenhead, Cheshire.
Richard Brown	United Kingdom	The schooner ran aground in the River Foyle. She was on a voyage from Londonderry to Troon, Ayrshire. She was refloated with the assistance of a tug and was towed back to Londonderry in a leaky condition.
Volante	United Kingdom	The brig foundered off Nash Point, Glamorgan. Her crew were rescued. She was on a voyage from Swansea, Glamorgan to Mataró, Spain.

== 23 April ==
List of shipwrecks: 23 April 1871
Ship	State	Description
Auxilar	United Kingdom	The ship was damaged by fire at Falmouth, Cornwall. The fire was extinguished with assistance from HMS Ganges (Royal Navy).
Kestrel	United Kingdom	The steamship was run down and sunk off the Dudgeon Sandbank, in the North Sea by the steamship Frankland (United Kingdom). All on board were rescued by the steamship Eugenie (United Kingdom). Kestrel was on a voyage from Rotterdam, South Holland to Hull, Yorkshire.
St. Thomas Packet	United Kingdom	The brig ran aground on the Goodwin Sands, Kent. She was on a voyage from Lisbon, Portugal to Antwerp, Belgium. She was refloated with assistance and taken in to Ramsgate, Kent in a leaky condition.

== 24 April ==
List of shipwrecks: 24 April 1871
Ship	State	Description
Collingwood	United Kingdom	The steamship departed from Suez, Egypt for Bombay, India. Subsequently foundered in a typhoon with the loss of all 28 people on board.
Cwmavon	United Kingdom	The schooner sank off Rhoscolyn, Anglesey. She was on a voyage from Port Talbot, Glamorgan to Liverpool, Lancashire.
Edla	Sweden	The brig was driven ashore and wrecked near Bamburgh Castle, Northumberland, United Kingdom. She was on a voyage from Gothenburg to South Shields, County Durham, United Kingdom. She was refloated on 9 May and towed in to the River Tyne.
Hunsingo	Germany	The ship ran aground on the Gunfleet Sand, in the North Sea off the coast of Essex, United Kingdom. She was on a voyage from Hamburg to China.

== 25 April ==
List of shipwrecks: 25 April 1871
Ship	State	Description
Delight	United Kingdom	The schooner ran aground at Cardiff, Glamorgan.
Deveron	United Kingdom	The ship was driven ashore at Hela, Germany. She was on a voyage from Danzig, Germany to London.
Gipsey	United Kingdom	The schooner ran aground at Cardiff.
Julie	Germany	The schooner was driven ashore at Westkapelle, West Flanders, Belgium.
McGregor	United Kingdom	The schooner ran aground at Cardiff.
Star	United Kingdom	The schooner ran aground at Cardiff.

== 26 April ==
List of shipwrecks: 26 April 1871
Ship	State	Description
Union	United Kingdom	The schooner was beached south of Peterhead, Aberdeenshire. Her crew survived. She was on a voyage from South Shields, County Durham to Findhorn, Moray.

== 27 April ==
List of shipwrecks: 27 April 1871
Ship	State	Description
Albion	United Kingdom	The brig foundered in the Irish Sea off the Bahama Lightship ( Trinity House). Her crew were rescued. Albion was on a voyage from Whitehaven, Cumberland to Newport, Monmouthshire.
Elizabeth	United Kingdom	The ship ran aground at Hayle, Cornwall. She was on a voyage from Cardiff, Glamorgan to Hayle.
Indian Queen	United States	The brig foundered off Cape Hatteras, North Carolina with the loss of all hands, according to a message in a bottle that washed up on the coast of Virginia. She was on a voyage from Rio de Janeiro, Brazil to Baltimore, Maryland.

== 28 April ==
List of shipwrecks: 28 April 1871
Ship	State	Description
Jane	United Kingdom	The ship was driven ashore at Ryde, Isle of Wight. She was on a voyage from South Shields, County Durham to Waterford.
Mearnshire	United Kingdom	The sloop was wrecked at Johnshaven, Aberdeenshire. Her crew were rescued. She was on a voyage from Sunderland, County Durham to Stonehaven, Aberdeenshire.

== 29 April ==
List of shipwrecks: 29 April 1871
Ship	State	Description
Anna	United Kingdom	The ship ran aground on the Nieuwezand and was abandoned. Her crew were rescued by a pilot boat. She was on a voyage from Liverpool, Lancashire to Dordrecht, South Holland, Netherlands. She had been refloated by 1 May and resumed her voyage.
Emma	United Kingdom	The schooner foundered 5 nautical miles (9.3 km) north west of Clovelly, Devon Her crew were rescued.
Haparanda	Sweden	The ship ran aground and capsized at Middlesbrough, Yorkshire, United Kingdom. She was on a voyage from Gothenburg to Middlesbrough. She was righted.

== 30 April ==
List of shipwrecks: 30 April 1871
Ship	State	Description
Jenny	United Kingdom	The schooner ran aground on the Burbo Bank, in Liverpool Bay and sank. Her crew were rescued. She was on a voyage from Newry, County Antrim to Runcorn, Cheshire.
Laurel	United Kingdom	The ship ran aground in the River Aln. She was on a voyage from Goole, Yorkshire to Alnwick, Northumberland.
Rover	United Kingdom	The tug ran aground in Liverpool Bay.

== Unknown date ==
List of shipwrecks: Unknown date in April 1871
Ship	State	Description
Active	United Kingdom	The ship foundered off Fjällbacka, Sweden before 17 April.
Aigle	France	The ship was driven ashore at Brest, Finistère. She was on a voyage from Granville, Manche to Brest.
Albert	Germany	The ship was driven ashore on Scharhörn. She was on a voyage form Cuxhaven to Lagos, Africa. She was refloated.
Ann	Canada	The ship was lost "at the Sisters". She was on a voyage from Ponce, Puerto Rico to Halifax Nova Scotia.
Annchen	Germany	The ship was driven ashore on Læsø, Denmark. She was on a voyage from Newcastle upon Tyne, Northumberland, United Kingdom to Lübeck.
Arab	United States	The schooner was lost off Cape Cod. crew saved.
Arabia	United Kingdom	The steamship ran aground in the Hooghly River. She was on a voyage from Calcutta to Bombay, India. She was refloated and resumed her voyage.
Archibald	United Kingdom	The ship ran aground at Fowey, Cornwall.
Asia	United States	The ship was driven ashore at Bremerhaven, Germany. She was on a voyage from Philadelphia, Pennsylvania to Bremerhaven. She was refloated.
Black Prince	United Kingdom	The ship was wrecked at Stornoway, Isle of Lewis, Outer Hebrides.
Carmen	Spain	The ship was wrecked at the mouth of the Rhône. She was on a voyage from Mallorca to Nice, Alpes-Maritimes, France.
Christana	United Kingdom	The ship ran aground off Trelleborg, Sweden. She was on a voyage from Newcastle upon Tyne to Ystad, Sweden. She was refloated and resumed her voyage.
Conway Castle	United Kingdom	The ship was driven ashore at Akyab, Burma. She was refloated.
Cordelia	United Kingdom	The barquentine ran aground on the Brigantine Shoals.
Cynthia	United Kingdom	The ship was driven ashore at Middlesbrough, Yorkshire. She was on a voyage from Leith, Lothian to South Shields, County Durham. She was refloated and towed to Montrose, Forfarshire.
Dauntless	United Kingdom	The ship was driven ashore on Öland, Sweden. She was on a voyage from Riga, Russia to Aberdeen. She was refloated and taken in to Kalmar, Sweden.
Deo Gloria	Germany	The ship was driven ashore at Eitzenloch. She was on a voyage from Hamburg to Bremen.
Dilawur	India	The ship ran aground at Havre de Grâce, Seine-Inférieure, France. She was on a voyage from Bombay to Havre de Grâce.
Ebron	Italy	The barque was wrecked near Zengg, Kingdom of Croatia-Slavonia with the loss of four of her crew.
Elida	Flag unknown	The ship was driven ashore. She was on a voyage from "Saby" to Lillesand, Norway. She was refloated and taken in to Fredrikshavn, Denmark in a leaky condition.
Eliza Hector, or Eliza Hunter	United Kingdom	The ship foundered in the Atlantic Ocean before 20 April. Her crew were rescued by the schooner Emma Canada. Eliza Hector was on a voyage from New Guernsey, Solomon Islands to London.
Ernst	Germany	The ship ran aground in the Eider. She was on a voyage from Newcastle upon Tyne.
Hannah H.	United Kingdom	The ship was wrecked on the Folly Reef. She was on a voyage from Morant Bay, Jamaica to London.
Hazard	United Kingdom	The ship was abandoned at sea. She was on a voyage from Havana, Cuba to Falmouth, Cornwall.
Hiram	Germany	The barque ran aground on the Middelgrunden.
Isabella Brown	United Kingdom	The ship was driven ashore at Saugor, India. Her crew were rescued. She was on a voyage from Colombo, Ceylon to Calcutta, India.
Isis	United Kingdom	The steamship ran aground on Taylor's Bank, in Liverpool Bay. She was on a voyage from Alexandria, Egypt to Liverpool, Lancashire.
Jane Ann	New Zealand	The ketch left Greymouth, New Zealand and was not sighted again. Wreckage was recovered from the sea near Haumuri Bluff in early June which proved to be from the Jane Ann. No trace of her crew were ever found.
Johanna Sophie	Russia	The schooner was driven ashore and sank at "Everingen". She was on a voyage from Antwerp, Belgium to Middlesbrough to Rendsburg.
John White	Canada	The schooner was wrecked on Nashawena Island, Massachusetts, United States with the loss of a crew member. She was on a voyage from the Cape Verde Islands to Boston, Massachusetts.
Joseph Dodds	United Kingdom	The steamship ran aground at St. Stephen's Point, in the Dardanelles. She was on a voyage from Hartlepool, County Durham to Odesa, Russia. She was refloated on 26 April.
Joseph Weir	United Kingdom	The ship was driven ashore at Barnegat, New Jersey. She was on a voyage from the West Indies to New York.
Lesage	France	The ship was wrecked near Zanzibar. She was on a voyage from Zanzibar to Marseille, Bouches-du-Rhône.
Lucida	United States	The ship was driven ashore at Petit Manan Point, Maine. She was on a voyage from Boston, Massachusetts to Sackville, New Brunswick, Canada.
Margaret	United Kingdom	The ship was beached at Plymouth, Devon. She was on a voyage from Teignmouth, Devon to Runcorn, Cheshire.
Maria	Sweden	The ship ran aground and was damaged at Hellevoetsluis, Zeeland, Netherlands. She was on a voyage from Trelleborg to Hellevoetsluis. She was refloated and taken in to Hellevoetsluis.
Maria J. Moore	United States	The ship was abandoned in the Atlantic Ocean. She was on a voyage from Puerto Plata, Dominican Republic to Boston, Massachusetts.
Marie	France	The ship was driven ashore and severely damaged at La Calle, Algeria.
Martha Norbon	Netherlands	The ship ran aground at "Harbins". She was refloated and taken in to Texel, North Holland, Netherlands.
Mary Lloyd	United Kingdom	The schooner was driven ashore at Yarmouth, Isle of Wight.
Mercury	United Kingdom	The steamship was driven ashore at the "Asiatic Castle". She was on a voyage from Newcastle upon Tyne to Constantinople.
Minna	Germany	The ship was driven ashore at Rügenwaldermünde. She was refloated.
Minnie Arnold	Canada	The ship was abandoned at sea in a waterlogged condition. She was on a voyage from Port Medway, Nova Scotia to Saint Kitts.
Nanny	United Kingdom	The ship was severely damaged at Guadeloupe. She was on a voyage from South Shields to Guadeloupe.
Napier	United Kingdom	The clipper ran aground and sank at Baker's Island.
Nelson	United Kingdom	The steamship was wrecked in the Niger River.
P. D. Donicke	Germany	The barque was driven ashore on Skagen, Denmark. Her crew were rescued. sHe was on a voyage from Hartlepool to Stettin.
Port Glasgow	United Kingdom	The ship was abandoned at sea. Her crew were rescued by Jamsetjee Cursetjee (India). Port Glasgow was on a voyage from Bristol, Gloucestershire to Quebec City, Canada.
Pretty Julia	United Kingdom	The schooner capsized at Buenos Aires, Argentina.
Prins Frederik	Denmark	The ship ran aground at "Stockosk". She was on a voyage from Visby, Sweden to Copenhagen.
Raswell	United States	The schooner was wrecked in the Desolation Islands.
Regent	United Kingdom	The brig ran aground at Heraclia, Ottoman Empire. She was on a voyage from Gemlik, Ottoman Empire to Glasgow, Renfrewshire. She was refloated and towed in to Constantinople, Ottoman Empire in a severely leaky condition.
Sabrina	United Kingdom	The ship was holed by ice and beached on Cape Breton Island, Nova Scotia.
Sebaldus	Germany	The ship was driven ashore at Leba. She was on a voyage from Kiel to Danzig.
Sisters	(Canada)	The ship was abandoned at sea. She was on a voyage from Nova Scotia to Barbados.
Socrates	United Kingdom	The barquentine was driven ashore near Puntales, Spain.
Splendid	United Kingdom	The ship ran aground. She was on a voyage from Minatitlán, Mexico to Bremen. She was refloated and taken in to Bremen.
Spring	United Kingdom	The ship ran aground and sank at Fraserburgh, Aberdeenshire. She was on a voyage from Ipswich, Suffolk to Fraserburgh.
St Giorgio	Trieste	The ship was driven ashore at "Vojuzza". She was on a voyage from Trieste to Alexandria, Egypt.
Sunbeam	United Kingdom	The ship sank at Rangoon, Burma.
Tartar	United Kingdom	The ship ran aground on Toby's Bank. She was on a voyage from Demerara, British Guiana to a British port.
Vigil	United Kingdom	The schooner was wrecked near Holyhead, Anglesey. Her crew were rescued.
Virginia Dare	United States	The ship was driven ashore at Satilla, Georgia. She was on a voyage from Satilla to Montevideo, Uruguat.
Volta	(United Kingdom of Great Britain and Ireland) Gibraltar	The ship ran aground and was wrecked at a port in Morocco.
Waterwitch	United States	The ship was driven ashore in Pocomoke Sound. She was on a voyage from Mayagüez, Puerto Rico to Baltimore. She was later refloated.
Wavelet	United States	The ship was driven ashore at Cape Cod, Massachusetts. She was on a voyage from Portland, Maine to Cárdenas, Cuba.
William Muir	United States	The ship was driven ashore at Currituck, North Carolina. She was on a voyage from Puerto Rico to Baltimore.
Windau	Russia	The ship was driven ashore at Riga. She was on a voyage from Riga to Devonport, Devon. She was later refloated.
Wind Flower	United Kingdom	The ship was destroyed by fire at sea. Her crew were rescued by Glencorse (United Kingdom). Wind Flower was on a voyage from Bahia, Brazil to Falmouth.
