= Jeff Davis County School District =

School district in Georgia (U.S. state)

Address
- 44 Charles Rogers Blvd Hazlehurst, Georgia, 31539; United States
- Coordinates: 31.864572°N 82.609121°W

District information
- Grades: Pre-kindergarten – 12
- Superintendent: Chris Roppe
- Accreditation(s): Southern Association of Colleges and Schools; Georgia Accrediting Commission

Students and staff
- Enrollment: 3,075 (2022–23)
- Faculty: 209.50 (FTE)
- Student–teacher ratio: 14.68

Other information
- Telephone: (912) 375–6700
- Website: jeff-davis.k12.ga.us

The Jeff Davis County School District is a public school district in Jeff Davis County, Georgia, United States, based in Hazlehurst. It serves the communities of Denton and Hazlehurst.

== Schools ==
The school district has two elementary schools, one middle school, and one high school.

=== Elementary schools ===
- Jeff Davis Elementary School
- Jeff Davis Primary School

=== Middle school ===
- Jeff Davis Middle School

=== High school ===
- Jeff Davis High School
