= JDHS =

JDHS may refer to:

- Jaap de Hoop Scheffer, Dutch politician and Secretary General of NATO
- Jamesville-Dewitt High School, Central New York
- Jeff Davis High School, Hazelhurst, Georgia
- John Dewey High School, Brooklyn, New York
- John Dickinson High School, Wilmington, Delaware
- Jonathan Dayton High School, Springfield, New Jersey
- Juneau-Douglas High School, Juneau, Alaska
