= National Register of Historic Places listings in Jeff Davis County, Georgia =

This is a list of properties and districts in Jeff Davis County, Georgia that are listed on the National Register of Historic Places (NRHP).

This National Park Service list is complete through NPS recent listings posted March 21, 2025.

== Current listings ==
| | Name on the Register | Image | Date listed | Location | City or town | Description |
|---|---|---|---|---|---|---|
| 1 | Jeff Davis County Courthouse | Jeff Davis County Courthouse | September 18, 1980 (#80001098) | Courthouse Sq. 31°51′45″N 82°36′03″W | Hazlehurst | 1907 |
| 2 | Pace House | Pace House | July 5, 2003 (#03000591) | 61 E. Coffee St. 31°52′04″N 82°35′47″W | Hazlehurst | Original 1900 house burned in 2011, this is an accurate rebuilding. Now used for Hazlehurst-Jeff Davis Historical Museum website |
