= Alfred Gardner =

Alfred Gardner may refer to:

- A. T. Goldie Gardner (1890–1958), English racing car driver
- Alfred Charles Gardner (1880–1952), British engineer
- Alfred Lunt Gardner (born 1937), American mammalogist
