= Jeff Davis County, Georgia =

County in Georgia, United States

- County
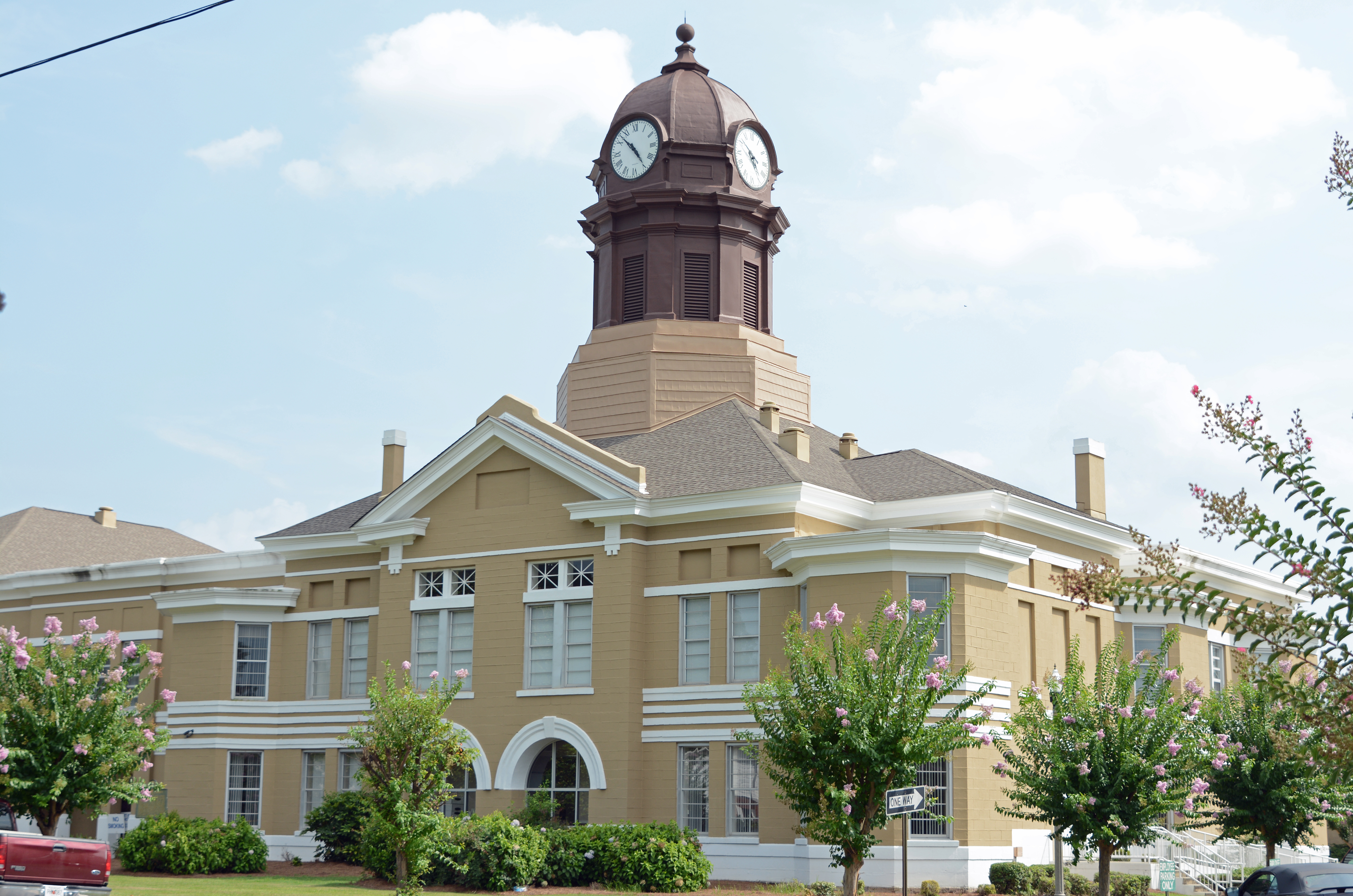
- County courthouse

- Seal Logo

- Location within the U.S. state of Georgia
- Coordinates: 31°48′N 82°38′W
- Country: United States
- State: Georgia
- Founded: August 18, 1905; 121 years ago
- Named for: Jefferson Davis
- Seat: Hazlehurst
- Largest city: Hazlehurst
- Other cities: Denton, Georgia

Area
  - Total: 335 sq mi (870 km^{2})
  - Land: 331 sq mi (860 km^{2})
  - Water: 4.7 sq mi (12 km^{2}) 1.4%

Population (2020)
  - Total: 14,779
  - Estimate (2025): 15,219 ▲
  - Density: 45/sq mi (17/km^{2})
- Time zone: UTC−5 (Eastern)
  - Summer (DST): UTC−4 (EDT)
- Congressional district: 12th
- Website: jeffdaviscountyga.gov

Jeff Davis County is a county located in the southeastern part of the U.S. state of Georgia. As of the 2020 census, the population was 14,779. The county seat is Hazlehurst. The county was created on August 18, 1905, and named for Jefferson Davis, the only Confederate president.

== Geography ==
According to the U.S. Census Bureau, the county has a total area of 335 square miles (870 km^{2}), of which 331 square miles (860 km^{2}) is land and 4.7 square miles (12 km^{2}) (1.4%) is water.

Most of the northern border area, as well as part of the western border of Jeff Davis County, from northeast of Hazlehurst to west of Denton, is located in the Lower Ocmulgee River sub-basin of the Altamaha River basin. Most of the eastern corner of the county, east of Hazlehurst and north of Graham, is located in the Altamaha River sub-basin of the larger basin by the same name. The central and southeastern portion of Jeff Davis County, south of Hazlehurst, is located in the Little Satilla River sub-basin of the St. Marys-Satilla River basin. The remaining central and southern portion of the county is located in the Satilla River sub-basin of the St. Marys-Satilla River basin.

=== Major highways ===
- U.S. Route 23 / State Route 19
  - State Route 19 Connector
- U.S. Route 221 / State Route 135
  - State Route 135 Connector
- U.S. Route 341 / State Route 27
- State Route 107
- State Route 268

=== Adjacent counties ===
- Wheeler County (north)
- Montgomery County (northeast)
- Toombs County (northeast)
- Appling County (southeast)
- Bacon County (southeast)
- Coffee County (southwest)
- Telfair County (northwest)

== Communities ==
=== Cities ===
- Denton
- Hazlehurst

=== Census-designated place ===
- Satilla

=== Unincorporated Communities ===
- Roper
- Snipesville
- Tallahassee

== Economy ==
Jeff Davis County had an estimated $164,341,000 in retail sales in 2017. Agriculture is a major factor of the economy. Cotton and peanuts, along with the formerly more significant tobacco, are the primary commercial crops. Timber, too, is an important product.

== Demographics ==
Historical population
Census	Pop.	Note	%±
1910	6,050		—
1920	7,322		21.0%
1930	8,118		10.9%
1940	8,841		8.9%
1950	9,299		5.2%
1960	8,914		−4.1%
1970	9,425		5.7%
1980	11,473		21.7%
1990	12,032		4.9%
2000	12,684		5.4%
2010	15,068		18.8%
2020	14,779		−1.9%
2025 (est.)	15,219	▲	3.0%
U.S. Decennial Census; 1790-1880 1890-1910; 1920-1930 1930-1940; 1940-1950 1960-1980; 1980-2000 2010

=== Racial and ethnic composition ===
Jeff Davis County, Georgia – Racial and ethnic composition Note: the US Census treats Hispanic/Latino as an ethnic category. This table excludes Latinos from the racial categories and assigns them to a separate category. Hispanics/Latinos may be of any race.
Race / Ethnicity (NH = Non-Hispanic)	Pop 1980	Pop 1990	Pop 2000	Pop 2010	Pop 2020	% 1980	% 1990	% 2000	% 2010	% 2020
White alone (NH)	9,509	10,025	9,992	11,056	9,950	82.88%	83.32%	78.78%	73.37%	67.33%
Black or African American alone (NH)	1,805	1,826	1,904	2,212	2,293	15.73%	15.18%	15.01%	14.68%	15.52%
Native American or Alaska Native alone (NH)	13	9	23	27	26	0.11%	0.07%	0.18%	0.18%	0.18%
Asian alone (NH)	4	24	56	70	50	0.03%	0.20%	0.44%	0.46%	0.34%
Native Hawaiian or Pacific Islander alone (NH)	x	x	0	0	7	x	x	0.00%	0.00%	0.05%
Other race alone (NH)	0	4	6	6	33	0.00%	0.03%	0.05%	0.04%	0.22%
Mixed race or Multiracial (NH)	x	x	52	120	373	x	x	0.41%	0.80%	2.52%
Hispanic or Latino (any race)	142	144	651	1,577	2,047	1.24%	1.20%	5.13%	10.47%	13.85%
Total	11,473	12,032	12,684	15,068	14,779	100.00%	100.00%	100.00%	100.00%	100.00%

=== 2020 census ===
As of the 2020 census, the county had a population of 14,779, 5,560 households, and 3,790 families. The median age was 37.0 years; 26.5% of residents were under the age of 18 and 15.8% were 65 years of age or older. For every 100 females there were 97.3 males, and for every 100 females age 18 and over there were 94.4 males age 18 and over. 33.3% of residents lived in urban areas, while 66.7% lived in rural areas.

The racial makeup of the county was 70.1% White, 15.6% Black or African American, 0.6% American Indian and Alaska Native, 0.4% Asian, 0.0% Native Hawaiian and Pacific Islander, 8.5% from some other race, and 4.9% from two or more races. Hispanic or Latino residents of any race comprised 13.9% of the population.

There were 5,560 households in the county, of which 35.6% had children under the age of 18 living with them and 28.2% had a female householder with no spouse or partner present. About 25.9% of all households were made up of individuals and 11.0% had someone living alone who was 65 years of age or older.

There were 6,351 housing units, of which 12.5% were vacant. Among occupied housing units, 66.9% were owner-occupied and 33.1% were renter-occupied. The homeowner vacancy rate was 1.4% and the rental vacancy rate was 9.4%.

== Politics ==
United States presidential election results for Jeff Davis County, Georgia
Year	Republican		Democratic		Third party(ies)	
Year	No.	%	No.	%	No.	%
1912	19	5.60%	268	79.06%	52	15.34%
1916	14	3.79%	299	81.03%	56	15.18%
1920	303	53.82%	260	46.18%	0	0.00%
1924	39	23.35%	122	73.05%	6	3.59%
1928	180	36.36%	315	63.64%	0	0.00%
1932	50	4.06%	1,179	95.70%	3	0.24%
1936	93	12.85%	631	87.15%	0	0.00%
1940	101	12.64%	696	87.11%	2	0.25%
1944	120	14.00%	737	86.00%	0	0.00%
1948	70	7.73%	611	67.51%	224	24.75%
1952	367	21.72%	1,323	78.28%	0	0.00%
1956	247	12.98%	1,656	87.02%	0	0.00%
1960	402	32.76%	825	67.24%	0	0.00%
1964	1,875	71.56%	745	28.44%	0	0.00%
1968	577	19.82%	376	12.92%	1,958	67.26%
1972	1,857	86.01%	302	13.99%	0	0.00%
1976	622	20.55%	2,405	79.45%	0	0.00%
1980	1,191	35.97%	2,059	62.19%	61	1.84%
1984	2,233	61.80%	1,380	38.20%	0	0.00%
1988	2,050	62.03%	1,242	37.58%	13	0.39%
1992	1,947	39.32%	2,031	41.01%	974	19.67%
1996	1,796	47.08%	1,576	41.31%	443	11.61%
2000	2,797	66.26%	1,379	32.67%	45	1.07%
2004	3,549	73.25%	1,277	26.36%	19	0.39%
2008	3,867	73.16%	1,356	25.65%	63	1.19%
2012	3,996	74.85%	1,275	23.88%	68	1.27%
2016	4,104	80.17%	901	17.60%	114	2.23%
2020	4,695	81.31%	1,028	17.80%	51	0.88%
2024	4,935	84.04%	924	15.74%	13	0.22%

United States Senate election results for Jeff Davis County, Georgia2
Year	Republican		Democratic		Third party(ies)	
Year	No.	%	No.	%	No.	%
2020	4,574	80.27%	1,013	17.78%	111	1.95%
2020	4,139	81.38%	947	18.62%	0	0.00%

United States Senate election results for Jeff Davis County, Georgia3
Year	Republican		Democratic		Third party(ies)	
Year	No.	%	No.	%	No.	%
2020	1,774	31.70%	590	10.54%	3,232	57.76%
2020	4,143	81.56%	937	18.44%	0	0.00%
2022	3,738	82.57%	738	16.30%	51	1.13%
2022	3,471	82.39%	742	17.61%	0	0.00%

Georgia Gubernatorial election results for Jeff Davis County
Year	Republican		Democratic		Third party(ies)	
Year	No.	%	No.	%	No.	%
2022	3,865	85.08%	646	14.22%	32	0.70%

As of the 2020s, Jeff Davis County is a Republican stronghold, voting 84% for Donald Trump in 2024. For elections to the United States House of Representatives, Jeff Davis County is part of Georgia's 8th congressional district, currently represented by Austin Scott. For elections to the Georgia State Senate, Jeff Davis County is part of District 19. For elections to the Georgia House of Representatives, Jeff Davis County is part of district 157.

The Jeff Davis County School District has four schools, including the Jeff Davis High School.

== See also ==
- National Register of Historic Places listings in Jeff Davis County, Georgia
- List of counties in Georgia
