= Althorpe railway station =

Railway station in North Lincolnshire, England

Althorpe
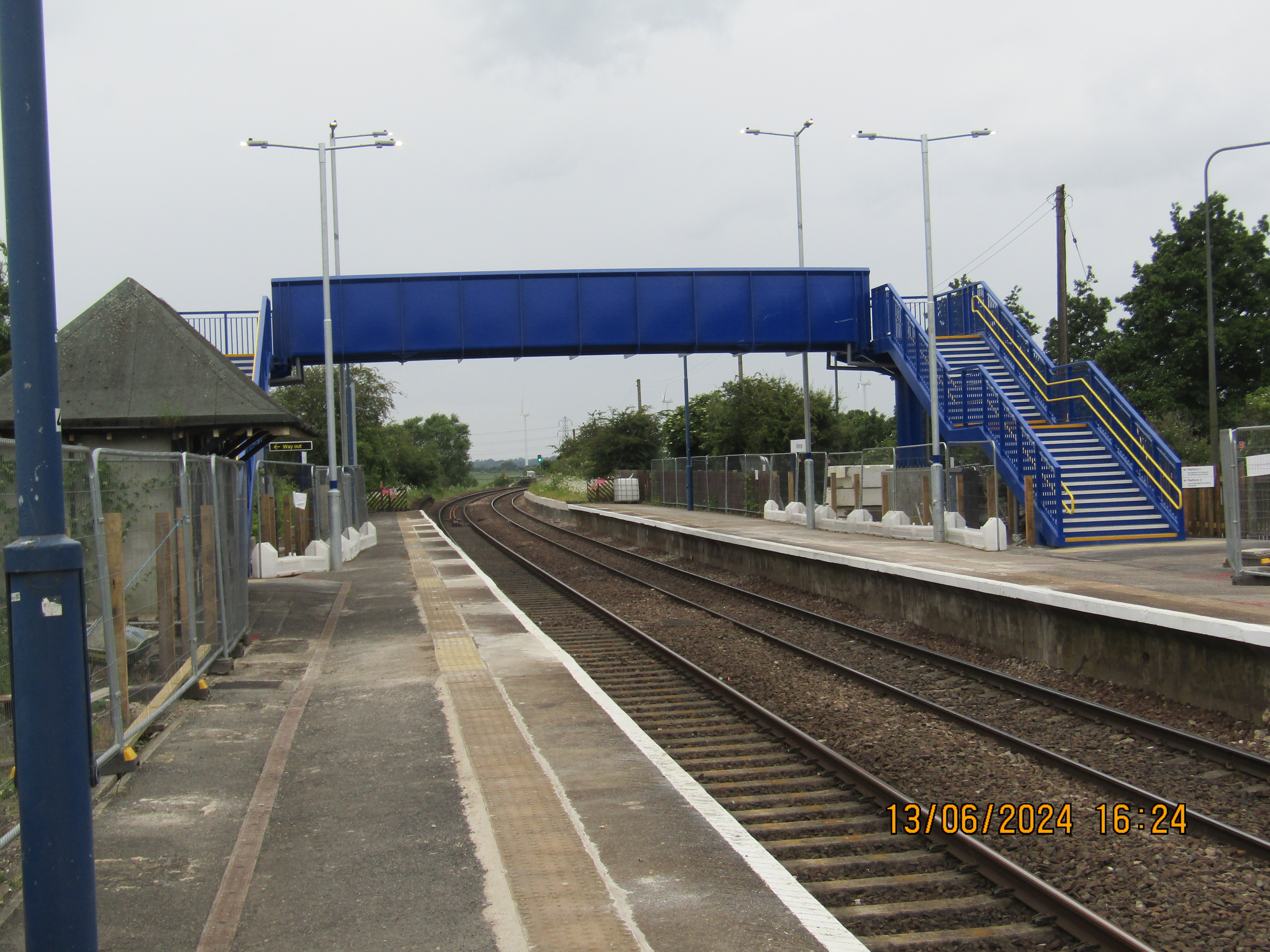
- Entrance to the station

General information
- Location: Althorpe, North Lincolnshire; England
- Coordinates: 53.58557°N 0.73300°W
- Grid reference: SE839106
- Manager: Northern Trains
- Platforms: 2

Other information
- Station code: ALP
- Classification: DfT category F2

History
- Original company: Great Central Railway
- Post-grouping: London and North Eastern Railway

Key dates
- 1 October 1866: Station opens
- 21 May 1916: Station resited

Passengers
- 2021/22: ▲4,488
- 2022/23: ▼1,408
- 2023/24: ▲3,294
- 2024/25: ▲3,816
- 2025/26: ▲4,822
Location
Notes
- Passenger statistics from the Office of Rail and Road

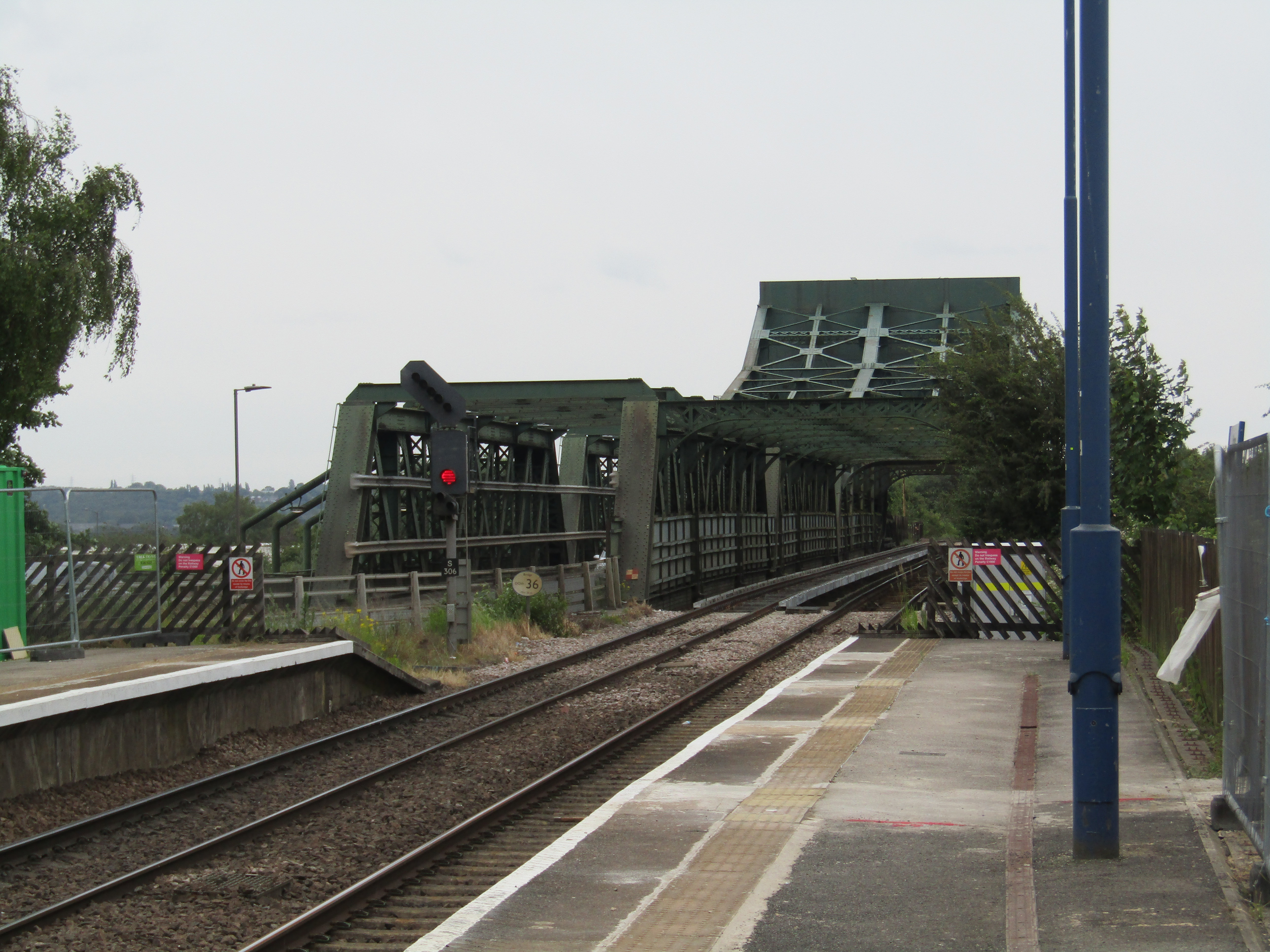
Keadby Bridge (King George V Bridge) from Althorpe Railway Station Platform 2

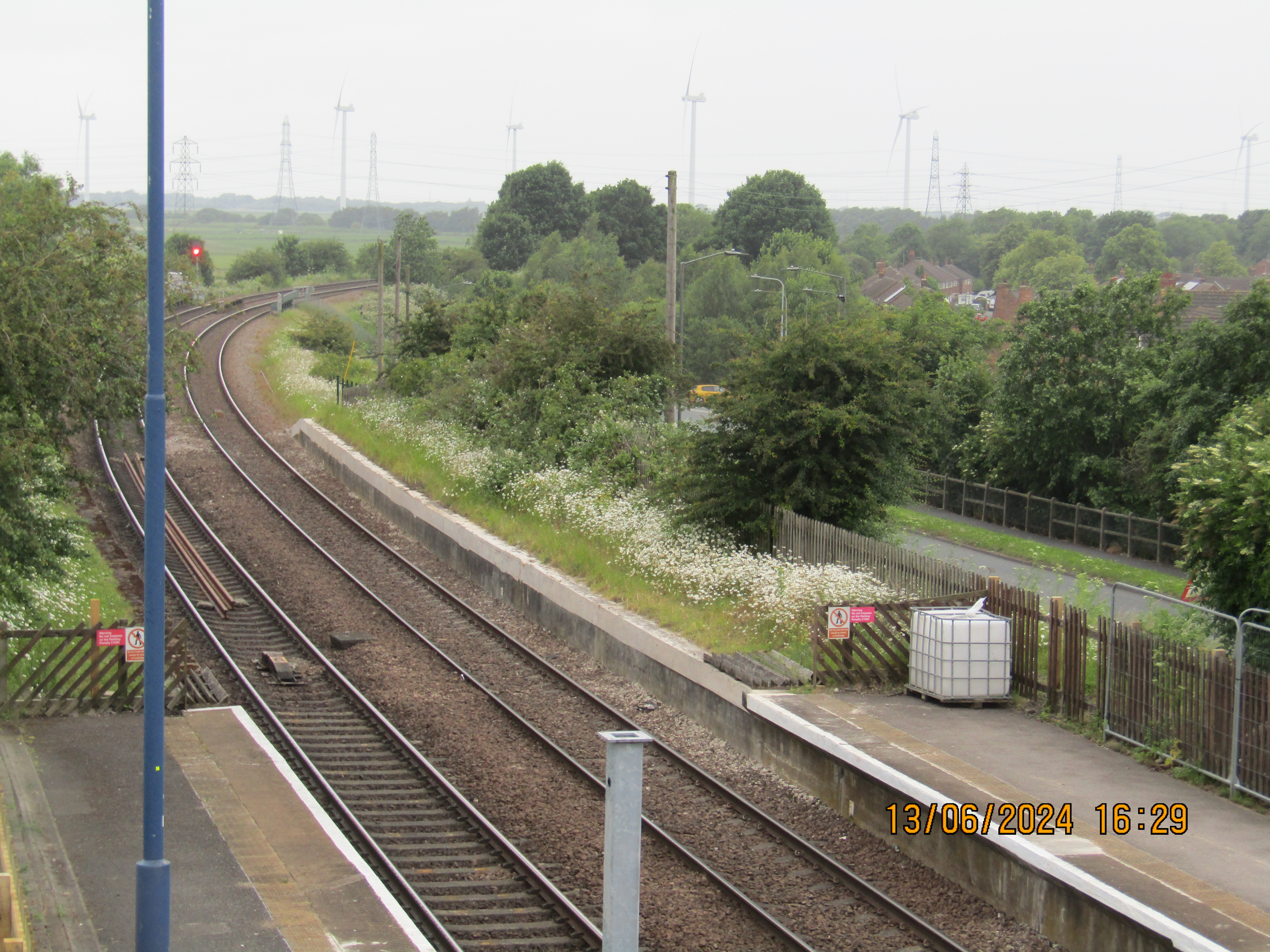
Althorpe Railway Station Disused Part of Platform 1

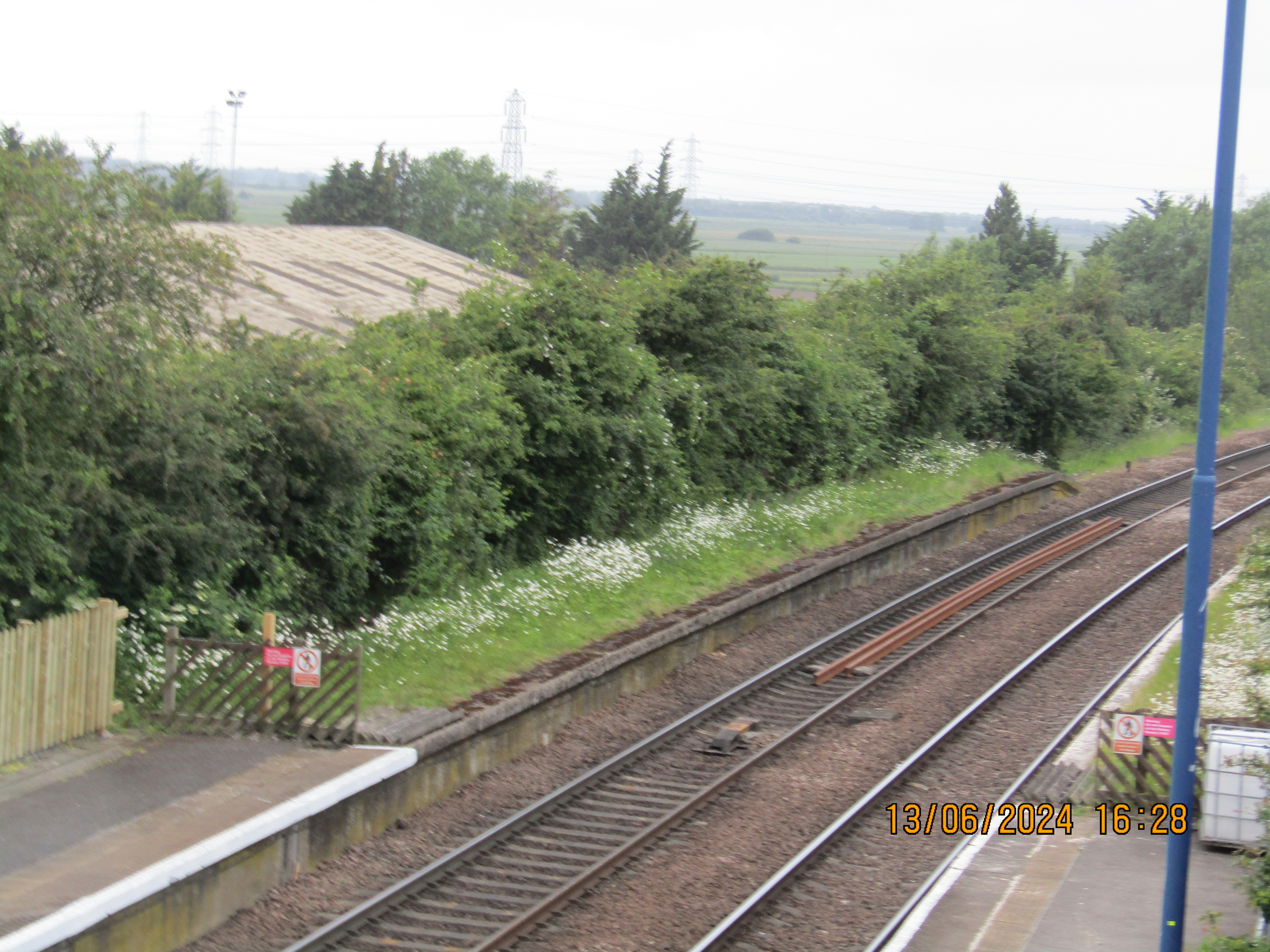
Althorpe Railway Station Disused Part of Platform 2

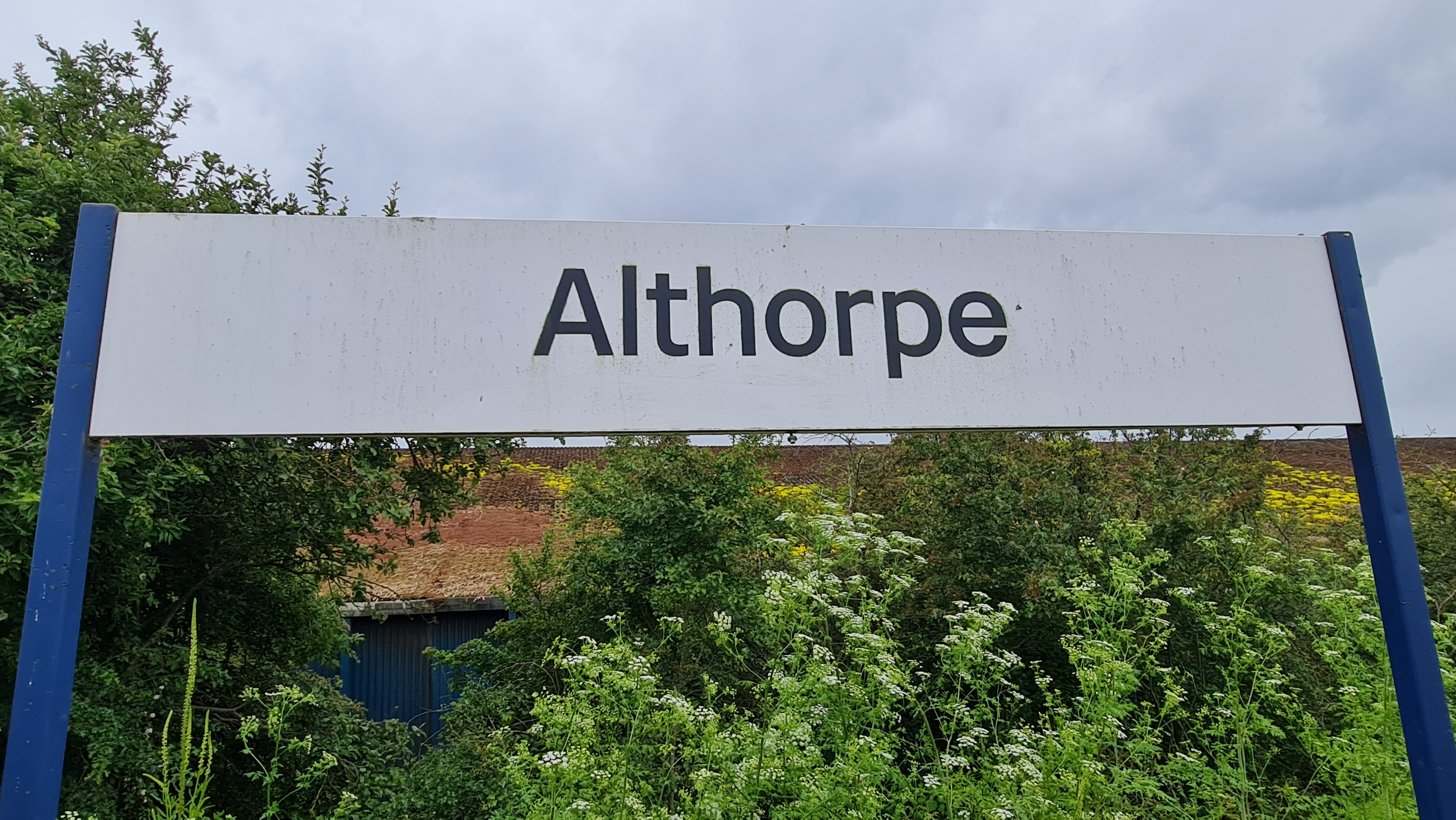
Althorpe New Station Sign (Rail Alphabet 2)

Althorpe railway station serves the village of Althorpe in North Lincolnshire, England. The station is also very close to the villages of Keadby, Gunness and Burringham.

Most services are provided by Northern Trains who operate the station. Occasional services by TransPennine Express also call at this station.

The station is unstaffed and has very limited facilities. There is a shelter on each platform, with a telephone and a help point for contact with Customer Services and British Transport Police on Platform 1 (eastbound); train running information is also provided by timetable posters on each side. Platform 2 (westbound) is accessible only by a footbridge with 50 steps.

The station is on the west bank of the River Trent, to the west of the combined road-and-rail King George V Bridge, which was a lifting bridge until the late 1950s.

== History ==
The first Althorpe station, opened by the Manchester, Sheffield and Lincolnshire Railway, was on the original line over the Trent and replaced the terminus, Keadby, on the South Yorkshire Railway, which became Keadby Goods. This station was originally known as Keadby and Althorpe.

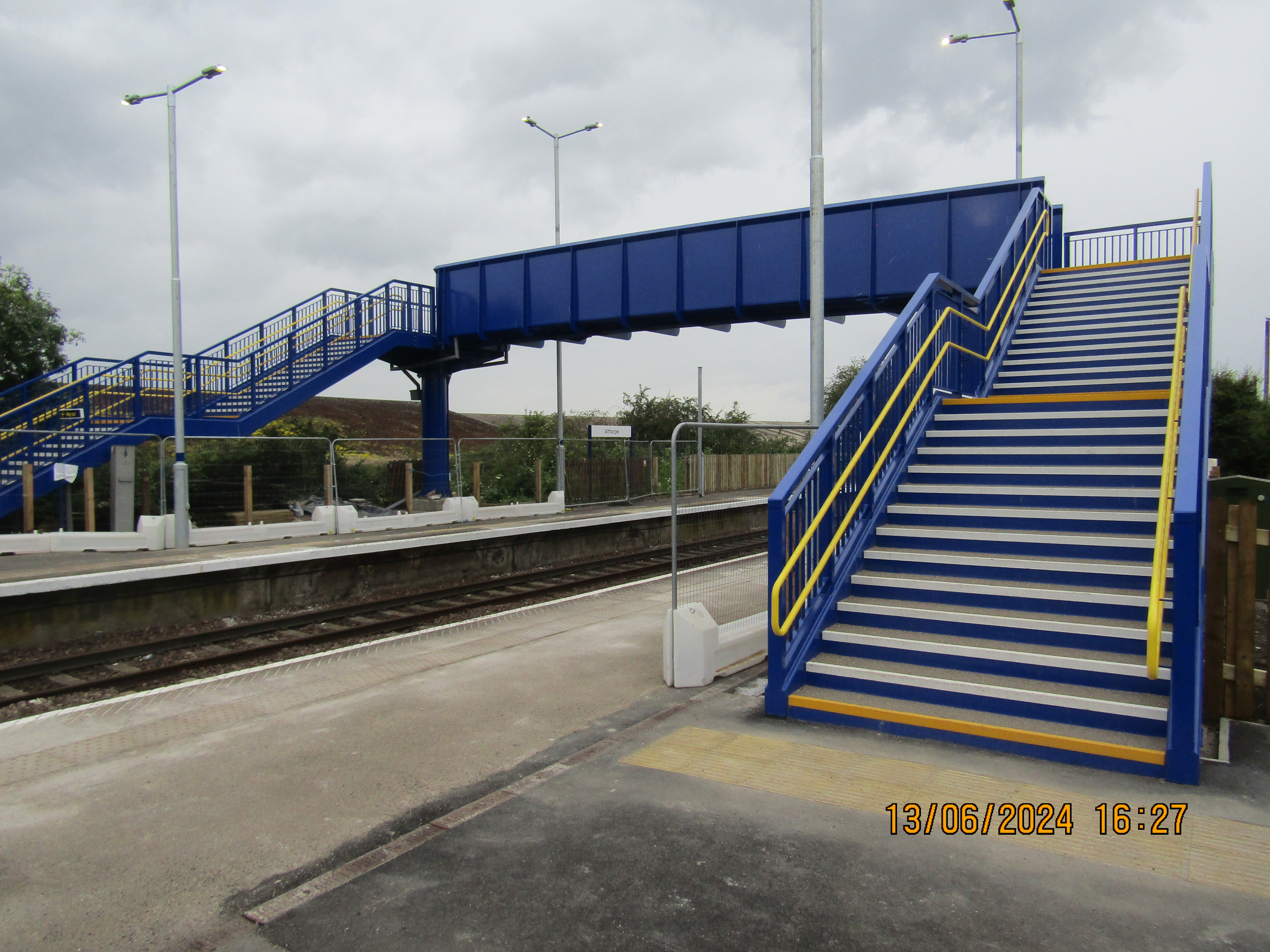
Footbridge

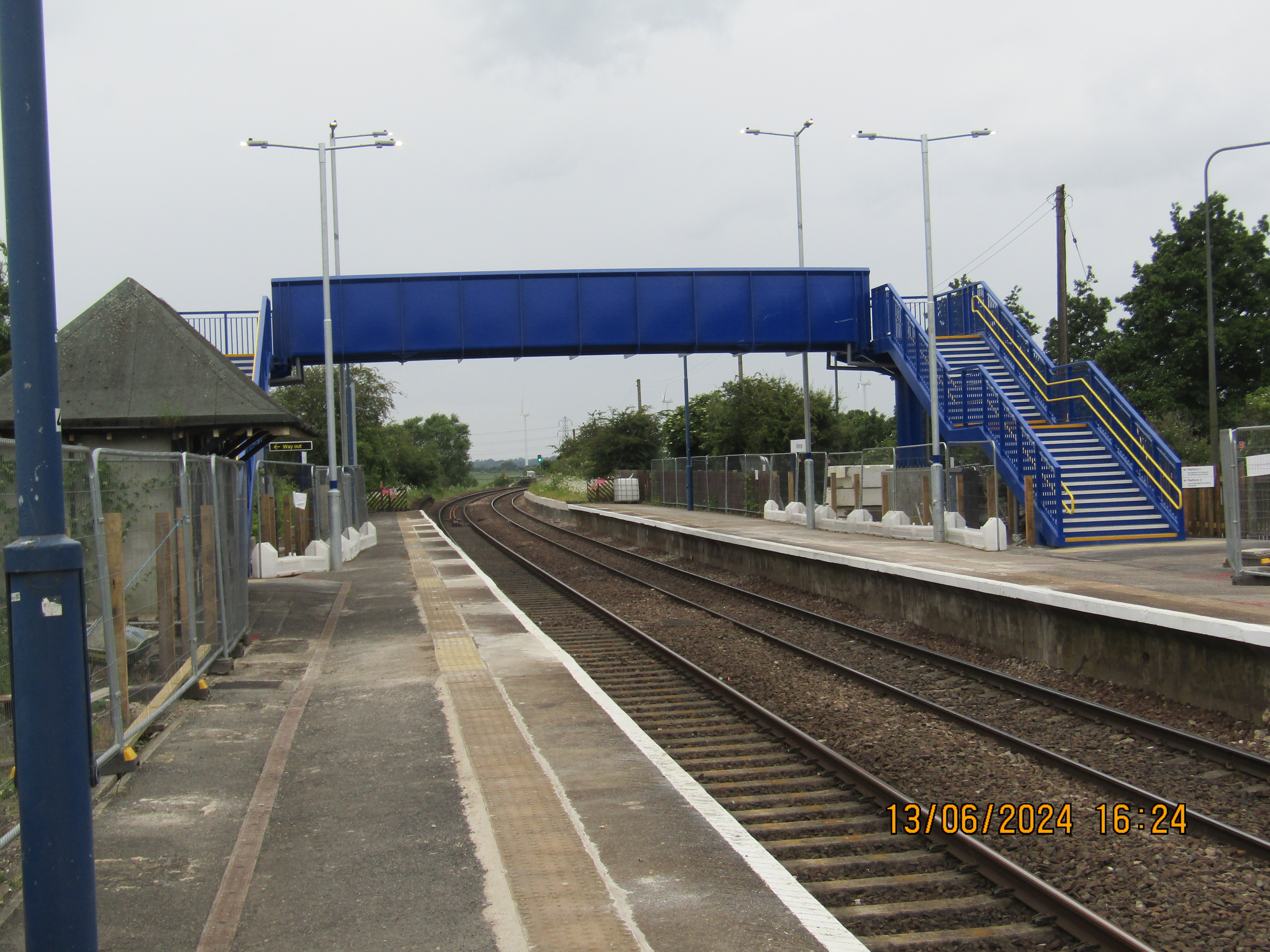
Althorpe Railway Station New Footbridge from Platform 2

When the line was again moved to a new alignment to cross the river by the present "King George V" bridge a new station was opened which is still in use. It replaced two earlier stations, Althorpe and Gunness & Burringham, which had been about half a mile apart.

The station which now bears the name, became part of the London and North Eastern Railway during the Grouping of 1923. The station then passed to the Eastern Region of British Railways on nationalisation in 1948.

When Sectorisation was introduced in the 1980s, the station was served by Regional Railways until the Privatisation of British Railways.

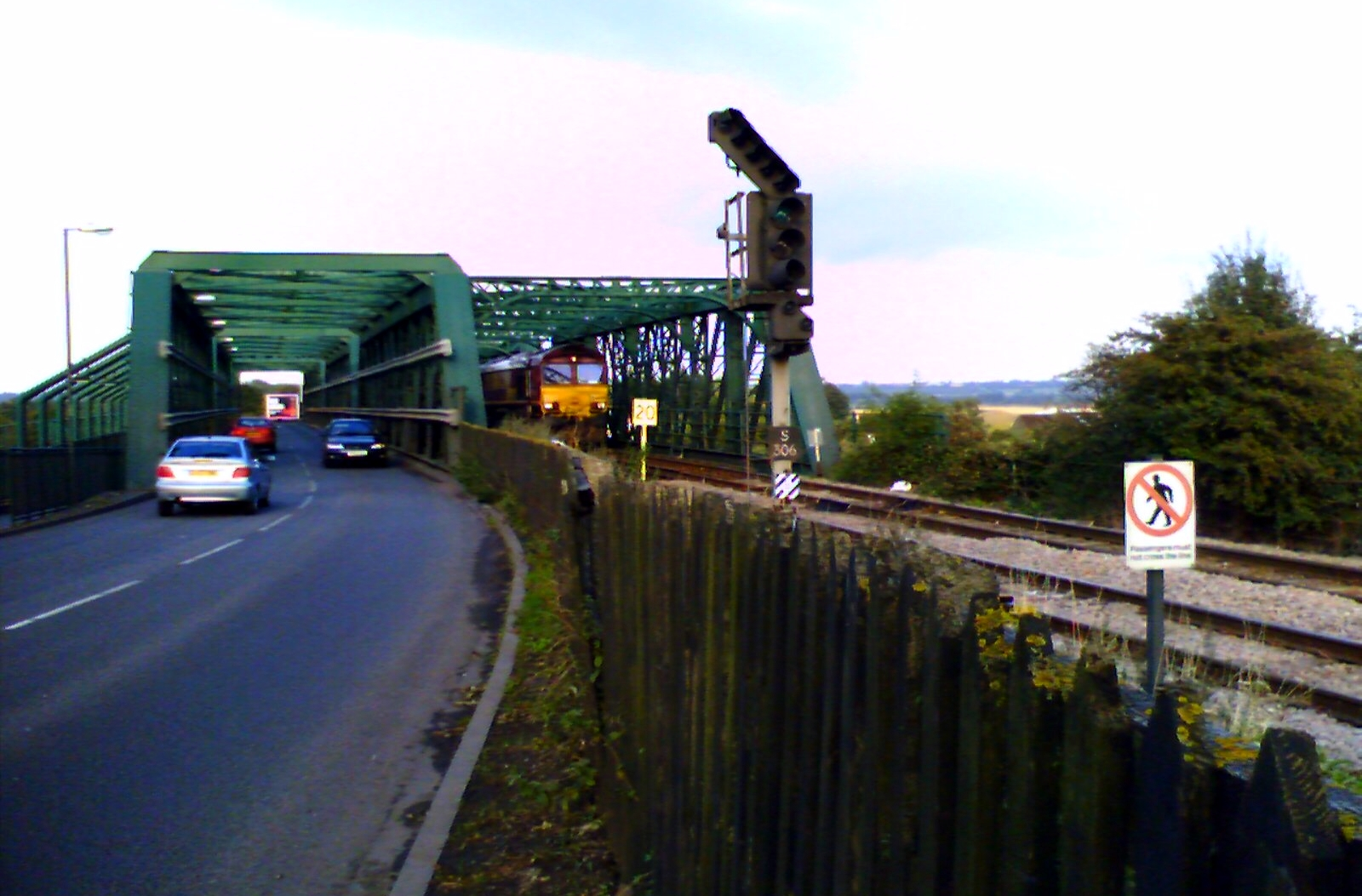
Train approaching from Keadby Bridge

== Services ==
Before the COVID-19 pandemic, Northern Trains ran an hourly service Monday-Saturday in both direction calling here between Doncaster and Scunthorpe. With no service on a Sunday.

That was reduced to a rail replacement bus service every two hours, again with no services on a Sunday after the pandemic. In the winter 2022 timetable, the rail service has been reinstated, but is still on a two-hourly service pattern as of 2025.

A Monday-Saturday early morning TransPennine Express service between Cleethorpes and Liverpool Lime Street also calls here, as does the last corresponding service from Liverpool.

In February 2013 the line northeast of Hatfield and Stainforth station towards Thorne was blocked by the Hatfield Colliery landslip, with all services over the section halted. The line reopened in July 2013.

Preceding station	National Rail	Following station
Crowle	Northern Trains South Humberside Main Line Monday-Saturday only	Scunthorpe
Crowle	TransPennine Express South Humberside Main Line; South TransPennine Limited Service	Scunthorpe
