= Tallahassee, Georgia =

Unincorporated community in Georgia, U.S.

Coordinates: 31°55′09″N 82°34′08″W

Tallahassee is an unincorporated community in Jeff Davis County, Georgia, United States. There were 13 households and the population was 32 as of 2000.
