= Hazlehurst, Georgia =

City in Georgia, United States

- City
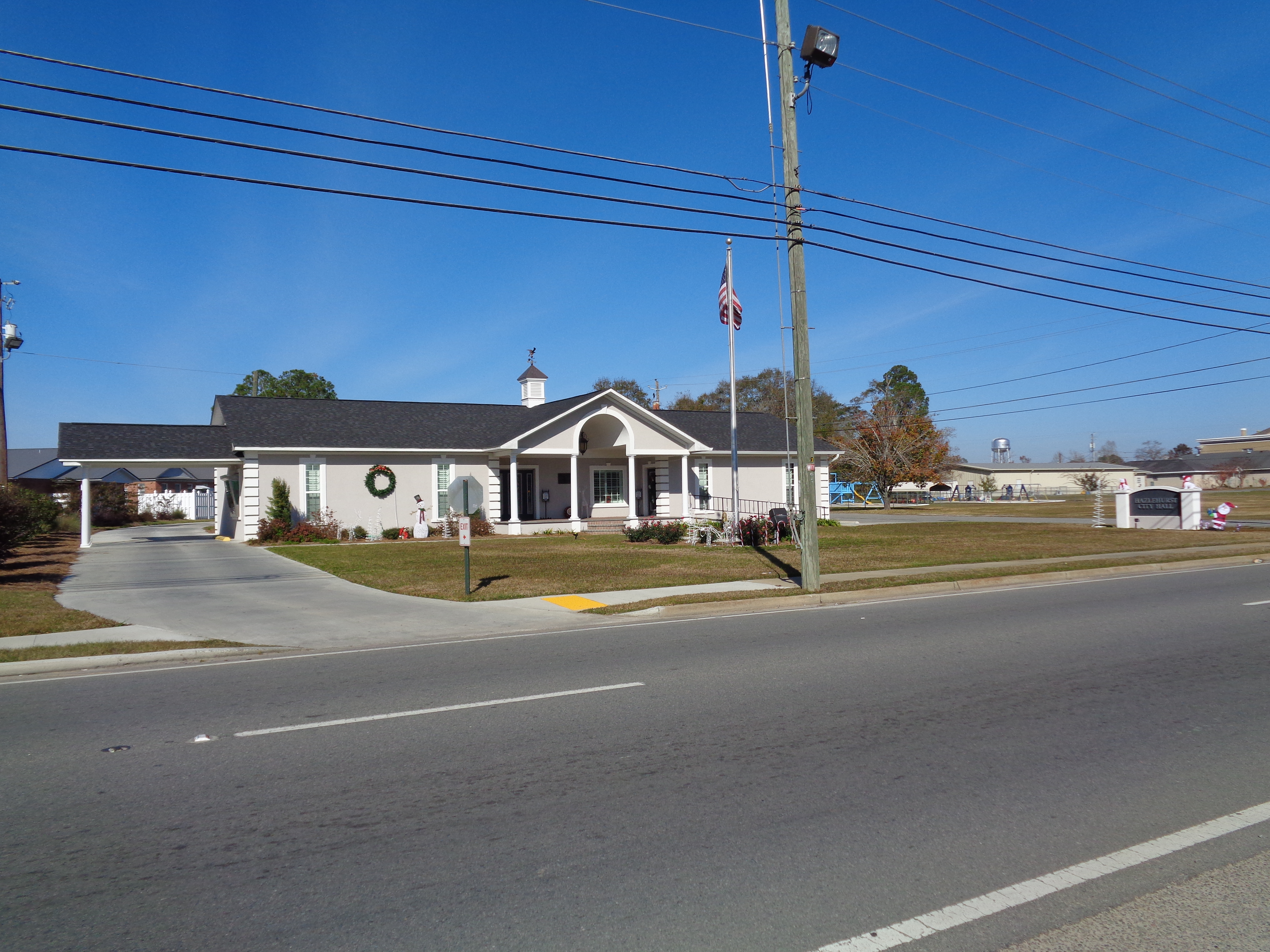
- Hazlehurst City Hall

- Flag Seal
- Motto: "Come linger' longer"
- Location in Jeff Davis County and the state of Georgia
- Coordinates: 31°51′58″N 82°35′58″W
- Country: United States
- State: Georgia
- County: Jeff Davis
- Named for: George Hazlehurst

Government
  - Mayor: John Ramay

Area
  - Total: 4.81 sq mi (12.45 km^{2})
  - Land: 4.73 sq mi (12.26 km^{2})
  - Water: 0.077 sq mi (0.20 km^{2})
- Elevation: 249 ft (76 m)

Population (2020)
  - Total: 4,088
  - Density: 863.7/sq mi (333.48/km^{2})
- Time zone: UTC-5 (Eastern (EST))
  - Summer (DST): UTC-4 (EDT)
- ZIP code: 31539
- Area code: 912
- FIPS code: 13-37564
- GNIS feature ID: 0315266
- Website: hazlehurstga.gov

Hazlehurst is a city in and the county seat of Jeff Davis County, Georgia, United States. The population was 4,088 in 2020.

== History ==
Initially called "Handtown" due to the Hand Family living in the area, it wasn't until the establishment of the railroad line from Macon to Brunswick that an actual community began to populate in the area. It was formally founded circa 1880 as depot on the Macon and Brunswick Railroad. The depot was first named "Milepost 8" before eventually gaining the name "Hazlehurst". The community was named for railroad surveyor Col. George Hazlehurst. In 1891, the community was incorporated as a town. A courthouse was not built until 1907, after the formation of Jeff Davis County the previous year.

== Geography ==
=== Transportation ===
Hazlehurst is served by the intersection of U.S. routes 23, 221 and 341. U.S. 23 heads south, south-east for 25 miles towards Alma and north-west for 8 miles to Lumber City, while U.S. 341 travels south-east for roughly 16 miles to Baxley and joins U.S. 23 heading north-west towards Lumber City. U.S. 221 heads 29 miles north-east towards Vidalia and south-west for 31 miles to Douglas.

Aside from the Macon-Brunswick railroad running through the center of town, the Hazlehurst Municipal Airport, a roughly 165 acre facility located just northwest of the city.

=== Climate ===
Climate data for Hazlehurst, Georgia, 1991–2020 normals, extremes 1918–2015
Month	Jan	Feb	Mar	Apr	May	Jun	Jul	Aug	Sep	Oct	Nov	Dec	Year
Record high °F (°C)	85 (29)	84 (29)	93 (34)	95 (35)	102 (39)	105 (41)	107 (42)	104 (40)	106 (41)	97 (36)	88 (31)	85 (29)	107 (42)
Mean daily maximum °F (°C)	60.3 (15.7)	64.1 (17.8)	70.9 (21.6)	77.8 (25.4)	85.1 (29.5)	89.7 (32.1)	92.4 (33.6)	91.4 (33.0)	86.6 (30.3)	78.7 (25.9)	69.8 (21.0)	62.5 (16.9)	77.4 (25.2)
Daily mean °F (°C)	49.1 (9.5)	52.4 (11.3)	58.8 (14.9)	65.5 (18.6)	73.3 (22.9)	79.2 (26.2)	82.1 (27.8)	81.2 (27.3)	76.3 (24.6)	66.9 (19.4)	57.5 (14.2)	51.4 (10.8)	66.1 (19.0)
Mean daily minimum °F (°C)	37.9 (3.3)	40.7 (4.8)	46.7 (8.2)	53.2 (11.8)	61.5 (16.4)	68.8 (20.4)	71.7 (22.1)	71.0 (21.7)	66.0 (18.9)	55.2 (12.9)	45.2 (7.3)	40.3 (4.6)	54.9 (12.7)
Record low °F (°C)	10 (−12)	18 (−8)	20 (−7)	29 (−2)	40 (4)	47 (8)	58 (14)	56 (13)	45 (7)	28 (−2)	19 (−7)	15 (−9)	10 (−12)
Average precipitation inches (mm)	4.15 (105)	4.21 (107)	4.41 (112)	3.65 (93)	3.30 (84)	5.28 (134)	4.50 (114)	6.87 (174)	4.47 (114)	2.95 (75)	2.98 (76)	4.09 (104)	50.86 (1,292)
Average snowfall inches (cm)	0.0 (0.0)	0.1 (0.25)	0.0 (0.0)	0.0 (0.0)	0.0 (0.0)	0.0 (0.0)	0.0 (0.0)	0.0 (0.0)	0.0 (0.0)	0.0 (0.0)	0.0 (0.0)	0.0 (0.0)	0.1 (0.25)
Average precipitation days (≥ 0.01 in)	10.4	10.2	9.1	7.6	7.1	12.5	12.4	13.3	11.4	8.6	7.1	9.7	119.4
Average snowy days (≥ 0.1 in)	0.0	0.1	0.0	0.0	0.0	0.0	0.0	0.0	0.0	0.0	0.0	0.0	0.1
Source 1: NOAA
Source 2: XMACIS2

== Demographics ==
Historical population
Census	Pop.	Note	%±
1890	290		—
1900	793		173.4%
1910	1,181		48.9%
1920	1,383		17.1%
1930	1,378		−0.4%
1940	1,732		25.7%
1950	2,687		55.1%
1960	3,699		37.7%
1970	4,065		9.9%
1980	4,298		5.7%
1990	4,202		−2.2%
2000	3,787		−9.9%
2010	4,226		11.6%
2020	4,088		−3.3%
U.S. Decennial Census

=== 2020 census ===
As of the 2020 census, there were 4,088 people, 1,494 households, and 894 families residing in the city.

The median age was 35.3 years. 28.0% of residents were under the age of 18 and 16.1% of residents were 65 years of age or older. For every 100 females there were 94.4 males, and for every 100 females age 18 and over there were 87.9 males age 18 and over.

96.2% of residents lived in urban areas, while 3.8% lived in rural areas.

Of households in Hazlehurst, 35.8% had children under the age of 18 living in them. Of all households, 34.3% were married-couple households, 21.4% were households with a male householder and no spouse or partner present, and 37.1% were households with a female householder and no spouse or partner present. About 30.2% of all households were made up of individuals and 12.9% had someone living alone who was 65 years of age or older.

There were 1,803 housing units. The homeowner vacancy rate was 4.3% and the rental vacancy rate was 7.4%.

Hazlehurst racial composition as of 2020
Race	Num.	Perc.
White (non-Hispanic)	2,078	50.83%
Black or African American (non-Hispanic)	1,359	33.24%
Native American	9	0.22%
Asian	22	0.54%
Pacific Islander	3	0.07%
Other/Mixed	123	3.01%
Hispanic or Latino	494	12.08%

== Education ==
=== Jeff Davis County School District ===
The Jeff Davis County School District consists of a primary school, an elementary school, a middle school, and a high school. The district has 210 classroom teachers and 3,075 students.

- Jeff Davis Elementary School
- Jeff Davis Primary School
- Jeff Davis Middle School
- Jeff Davis High School
