= Jeff Davis High School =

Public high school in Hazlehurst, Georgia, United States

Location
- 156 Collins Street; Hazelhurst, Georgia 31539; United States
- Coordinates: 31°52′05″N 82°36′50″W

Information
- School type: Public high school
- School district: Jeff Davis County School District
- Principal: Greer Smith
- Faculty: 49.50 (FTE)
- Grades: 9–12
- Gender: Coeducational
- Enrollment: 846 (2023–2024)
- Student to teacher ratio: 17.09
- Colors: Blue and Gold
- Fight song: Up With The White And Gold
- Mascot: Yellow Jacket
- Website: hs.jeff-davis.k12.ga.us

Jeff Davis High School is a public high school located in Hazlehurst, Georgia, United States. The school is part of the Jeff Davis County School District, which serves Jeff Davis County. The mascot of the school, like the rest of the Jeff Davis County School District is the Yellow Jacket. The mascot image is based on the Georgia Institute of Technology Yellow Jacket with the black replaced with a navy color.
