= Althorpe =

Village in North Lincolnshire, England

Coordinates: 53.5775°N 0.7407°W

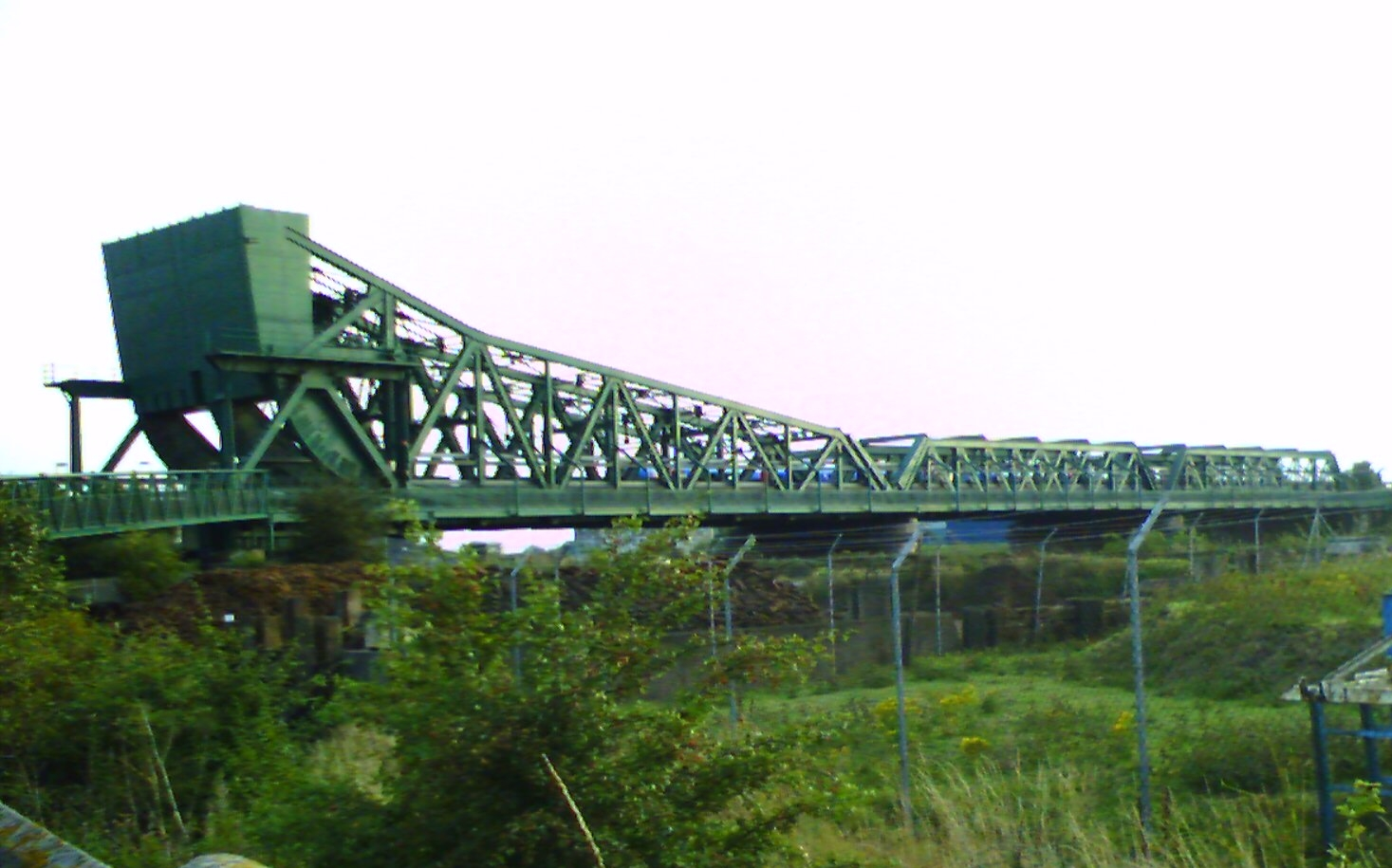
- Keadby Bridge

- Location within Lincolnshire
- Population: 1,752 (2001 census with Keadby)
- OS grid reference: SE797101
  - London: 145 mi (233 km) S
- Civil parish: Keadby with Althorpe
- Unitary authority: North Lincolnshire
- Ceremonial county: Lincolnshire
- Region: Yorkshire and the Humber
- Country: England
- Sovereign state: United Kingdom
- Post town: Scunthorpe
- Postcode district: DN17
- Dialling code: 01724
- Police: Humberside
- Fire: Humberside
- Ambulance: East Midlands
- UK Parliament: Scunthorpe

Althorpe is a small village and former civil parish, now in the parish of Keadby with Althorpe, in the North Lincolnshire district, in the ceremonial county of Lincolnshire, England. It is four miles (6 km) west of Scunthorpe and the same distance south-east of Crowle, on the A18 road.

== History ==
The Domesday Book records the lords of the manor in 1066 as Alnoth and Ulf Fenman. In 1086, the lord and tenant-in-chief was Geoffrey of la Guerche. The settlement was small with one ploughland and six sokemen.

A 1620s scheme by Vermuyden for drainage of the Isle of Axholme and Hatfield Chase had two phases:

1. The southern arm of the River Torne was blocked. The course of the other arm was straightened by cutting a drain, and its waters emptied through a sluice into the River Trent at Althorpe.
2. A second long drain was cut from Idlestop to Dirtness. This ran parallel to the River Torne and the water was sluiced into the River Trent at Althorpe. In the early 19th century an addition outfall – Folly Drain – was constructed at Derrythorpe. At a later stage these outfalls were replaced by a new outfall for 'the three rivers' at Keadby.

== Geography ==
The village lies within the civil parish of Keadby with Althorpe which includes the hamlet of Derrythorpe to the south. To the south of the village is the large civil parish of Belton, North Lincolnshire, and next to the River Trent is part of West Butterwick. It is one of twelve parishes in the Isle of Axholme, and before 1996 was in the Boothferry district of Humberside. Althorpe is in the Axholme North ward of North Lincolnshire. There were eight parishes in the Isle of Axholme. Amcotts was created from part of Althorpe in 1850.

In 1951 the parish of Althorpe had a population of 1067. On 1 April 1958 the parish was abolished and merged with Keadby to form "Keadby with Althorpe".

=== Keadby Bridge ===
The King George V Swing Bridge (also known as Keadby Bridge) crosses the River Trent near Althorpe to connect the Isle of Axholme to Scunthorpe and the rest of North Lincolnshire. The A18 crosses the bridge, and until the M180 motorway – 1 mile (1.6 km) to the south – opened in 1979, this was the main east–west route to Grimsby (through Scunthorpe).

The A18 previously went through the village but was diverted to the north-west. The A18 bypass opened on Wednesday November 29, 1933, costing £48,000, being almost three miles. There was a one-mile straight section, east of Pilfrey Bridge, over the Three Rivers. The bypass ended at the level crossing, to the north of the village.

== Community ==
Althorpe Grade I listed Anglican church is dedicated to St Oswald. Built in 1483 by Sir John Neville, it is of Perpendicular style. During a restoration in 1868 sedilia (stone seats) were found to have been erected on a marble slab dedicated to 14th-century rector William de Lound.

The ecclesiastical parish covers the approximate area of the civil parish, with St Oswald's church shared with Keadby in the combined parish of Keadby with Althorpe. The parish group of churches includes those at Amcotts and Belton.

St Oswald's church is in the older part of Althorpe. Althorpe and Keadby Primary School (opened in 1975), and the Post Office, are in the newer part near the bridge over the River Trent. The village public house is The Dolphin – the Original Dolphin Inn stood on the River Trent at the end of Ferry Lane, originally Dolphin Street.

Althorpe railway station, which lies to the north of the village on the South Humberside Main Line, is closer to Keadby.
