= Satilla, Georgia =

- Unincorporated community Census designated place
- Location within Georgia Location within the United States
- Coordinates: 31°47′15″N 82°34′04″W
- Country: United States
- State: Georgia
- County: Jeff Davis

Area
  - Total: 3.08 sq mi (7.98 km^{2})
  - Land: 3.06 sq mi (7.93 km^{2})
  - Water: 0.019 sq mi (0.05 km^{2})
- Elevation: 230 ft (70 m)

Population (2020)
  - Total: 487
  - Density: 159.1/sq mi (61.43/km^{2})
- Time zone: UTC-5 (Eastern (EST))
  - Summer (DST): UTC-4 (EDT)
- ZIP code: 31539
- Area code: 912
- GNIS feature ID: 332985

Satilla is an unincorporated community and census designated place in Jeff Davis County, Georgia, United States. Its population was 487 as of the 2020 census. U.S. Route 23 passes through the community.

== Demographics ==
Historical population
Census	Pop.	Note	%±
2010	421		—
2020	487		15.7%
U.S. Decennial Census; 1850-1870 1870-1880; 1890-1910 1920-1930; 1940 1950 1960; 1970 1980 1990; 2000 2010 2020

Saltilla first appeared as a census designated place in the 2010 U.S. census.

Satilla, Georgia – Racial and ethnic composition Note: the US Census treats Hispanic/Latino as an ethnic category. This table excludes Latinos from the racial categories and assigns them to a separate category. Hispanics/Latinos may be of any race.
Race / Ethnicity (NH = Non-Hispanic)	Pop 2010	Pop 2020	% 2010	2020
White alone (NH)	379	387	90.02%	79.47%
Black or African American alone (NH)	5	18	1.19%	3.70%
Native American or Alaska Native alone (NH)	1	1	0.24%	0.21%
Asian alone (NH)	5	2	1.19%	0.41%
Pacific Islander alone (NH)	0	0	0.00%	0.00%
Other Race alone (NH)	0	1	0.00%	0.21%
Mixed race or Multiracial (NH)	0	18	0.00%	3.70%
Hispanic or Latino (any race)	31	60	7.36%	12.32%
Total	421	487	100.00%	100.00%
