= Alfred Charles Gardner =

British engineer (1880–1952)

Alfred Charles Gardner FRSE MICE MIME (1880–1952) was a British engineer. He designed vast station roofs and bridges for the Great Western Railway. In later life, he created the launch sites for RMS Queen Mary and RMS Queen Elizabeth in the Clyde shipyards.

== Life ==
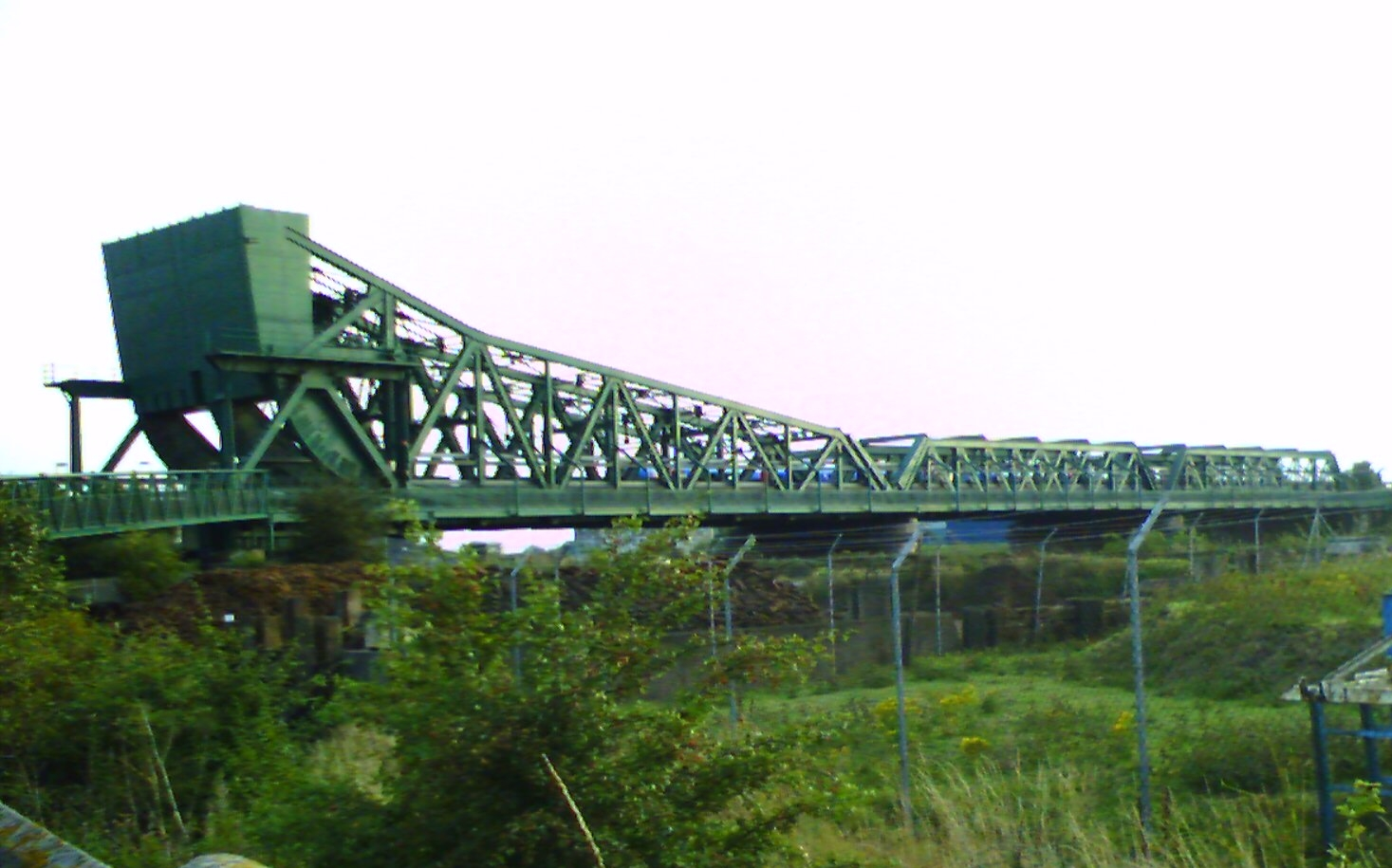
Keadby Bridge

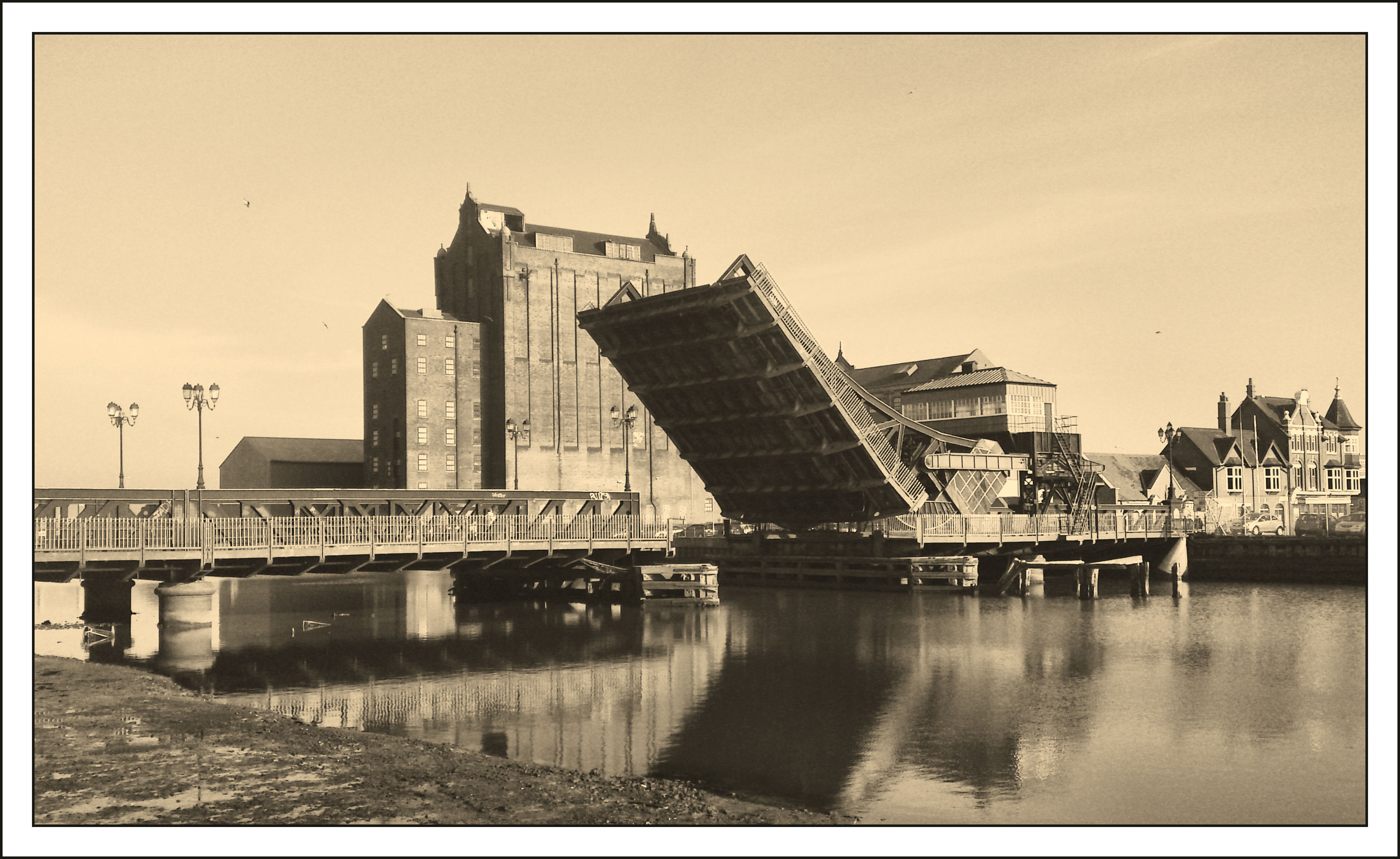
Corporation Bridge, Grimsby

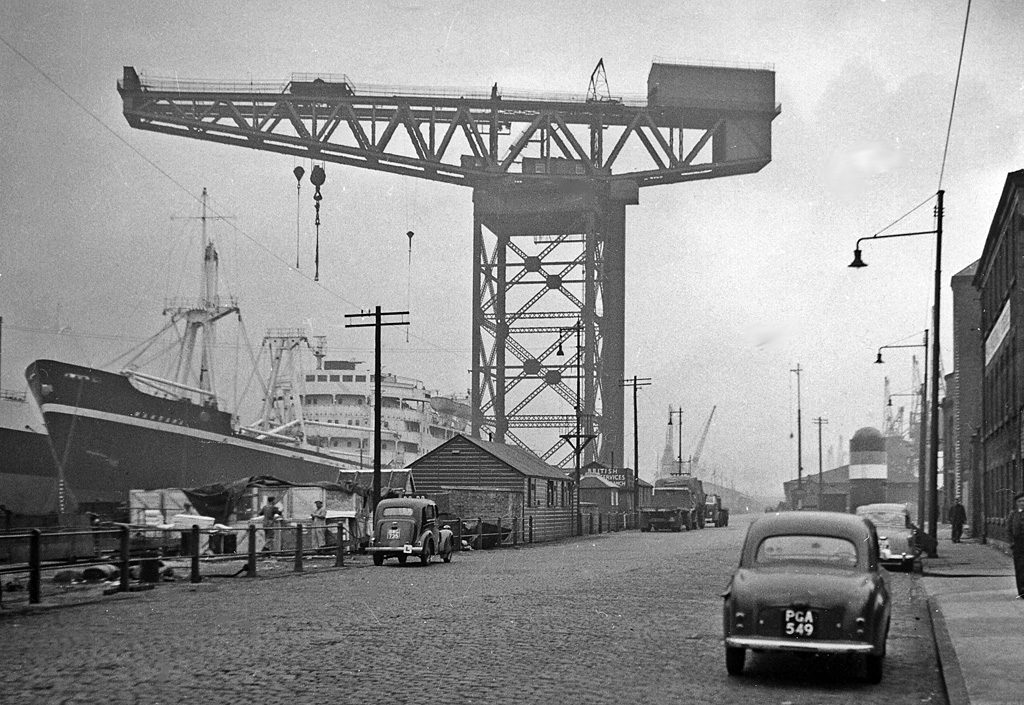
Finnieston Crane on the Stobcross Quay

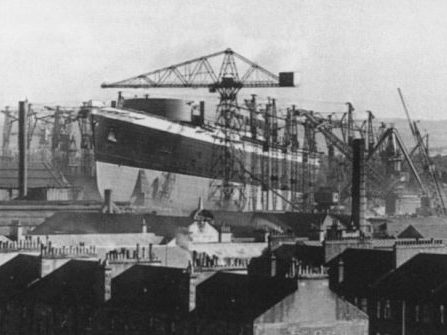
RMS Queen Elizabeth amidst Gardner's supporting structures

He was born in Richmond, Surrey, on 4 October 1880 the son of Henry Charles Gardner and his wife Sarah. He was educated at the Vineyard School in Richmond then at the Polytechnic School of Engineering in London.

In 1898, he was apprenticed to the Thames Ironworks, Shipbuilding and Engineering Company based in Blackwall, London and served there until 1901. He then went to work for London County Council. His first major project was their Electricity Generating Station at Greenwich. Later in 1901, he became Assistant Engineer at the Great Western Railway. In 1907, he moved to the Great Central Railway as Steelwork Assistant. He later became Principal Bridge Assistant, responsible for building over 30 bridges. The most unusual of these was the bridge at Keadby (1916) at its time, the largest lifting bridge in Europe.

From 1918 onwards, he served as the Dock Engineer for Grimsby and Immingham, working for the London and North Eastern Railway Company. Here, he built the Corporation Bridge across the dock entrance (1928). In 1929, he was appointed Chief Engineer for the Clyde Navigation Trust, becoming responsible for works in Glasgow's extensive docks and the River Clyde. Here, he was responsible for Plantation Quay and Lancefield Quay. He laid the bases at Stobcross Quay in preparation for the Finnieston Crane.

He prepared the launch sites for both the RMS Queen Mary and RMS Queen Elizabeth, including necessary dredging of the Clyde to ensure space for these huge ships.

In 1933, he was elected a Fellow of the Royal Society of Edinburgh. His proposers were A. H. Roberts, D McLellan, Sir Thomas Hudson Beare, David Alan Stevenson, D. Ronald, Edward Theodore Salvesen, and D. S. Stewart.

He retired in 1941. He died in Glasgow on 2 December 1952.

== Family ==
In 1906, he divorced his wife, Ada Maria on grounds of her infidelity.
