= Denton, Georgia =

- City
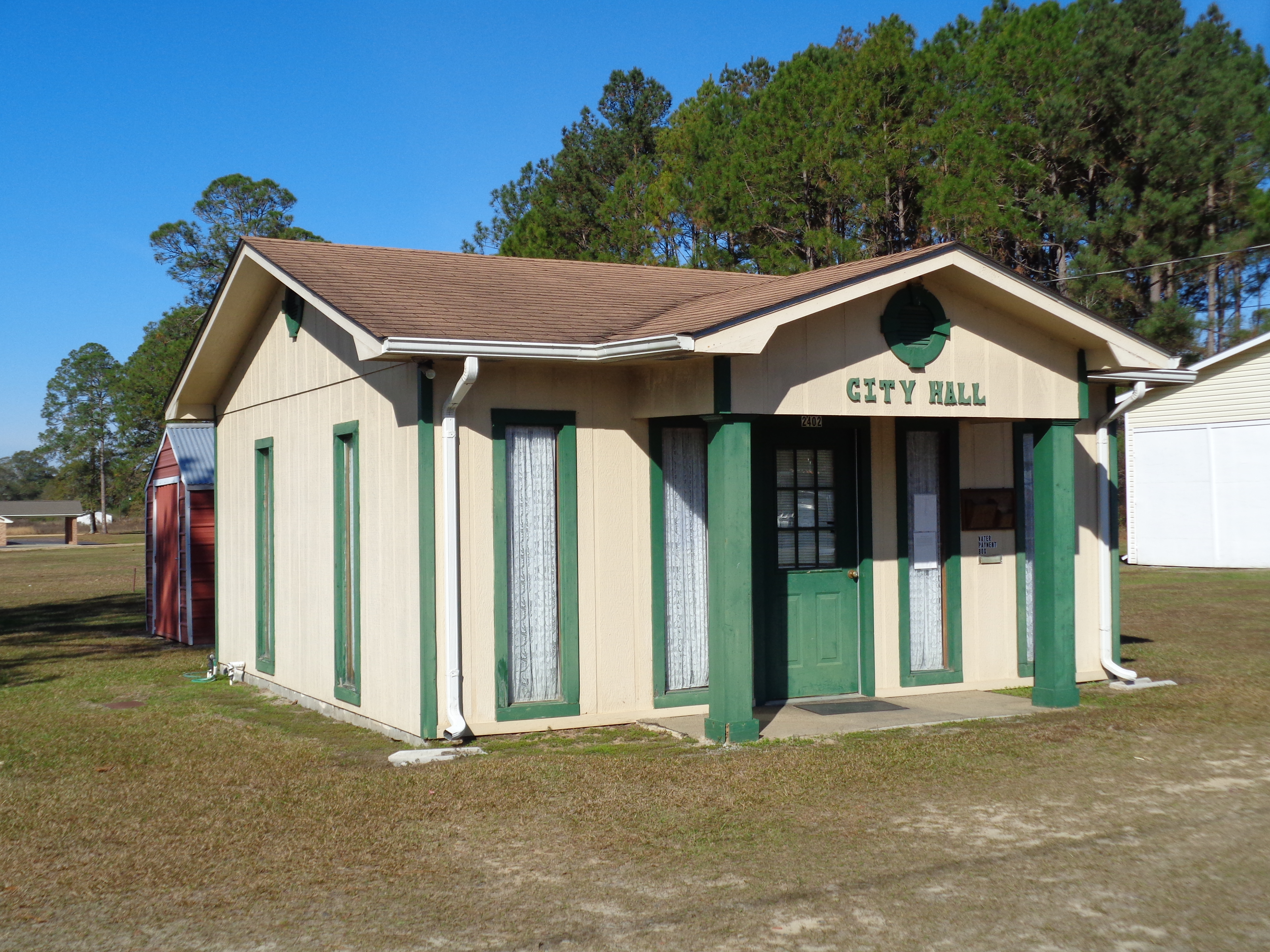
- Denton City Hall

- Location in Jeff Davis County and the state of Georgia
- Coordinates: 31°43′22″N 82°41′47″W
- Country: United States
- State: Georgia
- County: Jeff Davis

Area
  - Total: 1.54 sq mi (3.99 km^{2})
  - Land: 1.52 sq mi (3.94 km^{2})
  - Water: 0.019 sq mi (0.05 km^{2})
- Elevation: 260 ft (80 m)

Population (2020)
  - Total: 189
  - Density: 120/sq mi (48/km^{2})
- Time zone: UTC-5 (Eastern (EST))
  - Summer (DST): UTC-4 (EDT)
- ZIP code: 31532
- Area code: 912
- FIPS code: 13-22388
- GNIS feature ID: 0313447

Denton is a city in Jeff Davis County, Georgia, United States. The population was 189 in 2020.

== History ==
The Georgia General Assembly incorporated the place in 1911 as the "Town of Denton". The community most likely was named after Samuel Denton, an early settler.

== Geography ==
Denton is located at 31°43′22″N 82°41′47″W (31.722663, -82.696323).

According to the United States Census Bureau, the city has a total area of 1.5 square miles (3.9 km^{2}), all land.

== Demographics ==
Historical population
| Census | Pop. | Note | %± |
|---|---|---|---|
| 1930 | 215 | | — |
| 1940 | 254 | | 18.1% |
| 1950 | 273 | | 7.5% |
| 1960 | 255 | | −6.6% |
| 1970 | 244 | | −4.3% |
| 1980 | 286 | | 17.2% |
| 1990 | 335 | | 17.1% |
| 2000 | 269 | | −19.7% |
| 2010 | 250 | | −7.1% |
| 2020 | 189 | | −24.4% |
U.S. Decennial Census

In 2020, its population was 189, down from 250 in 2010.
