= Keadby =

Village in Lincolnshire, England

Coordinates: 53.5969°N 0.7417°W

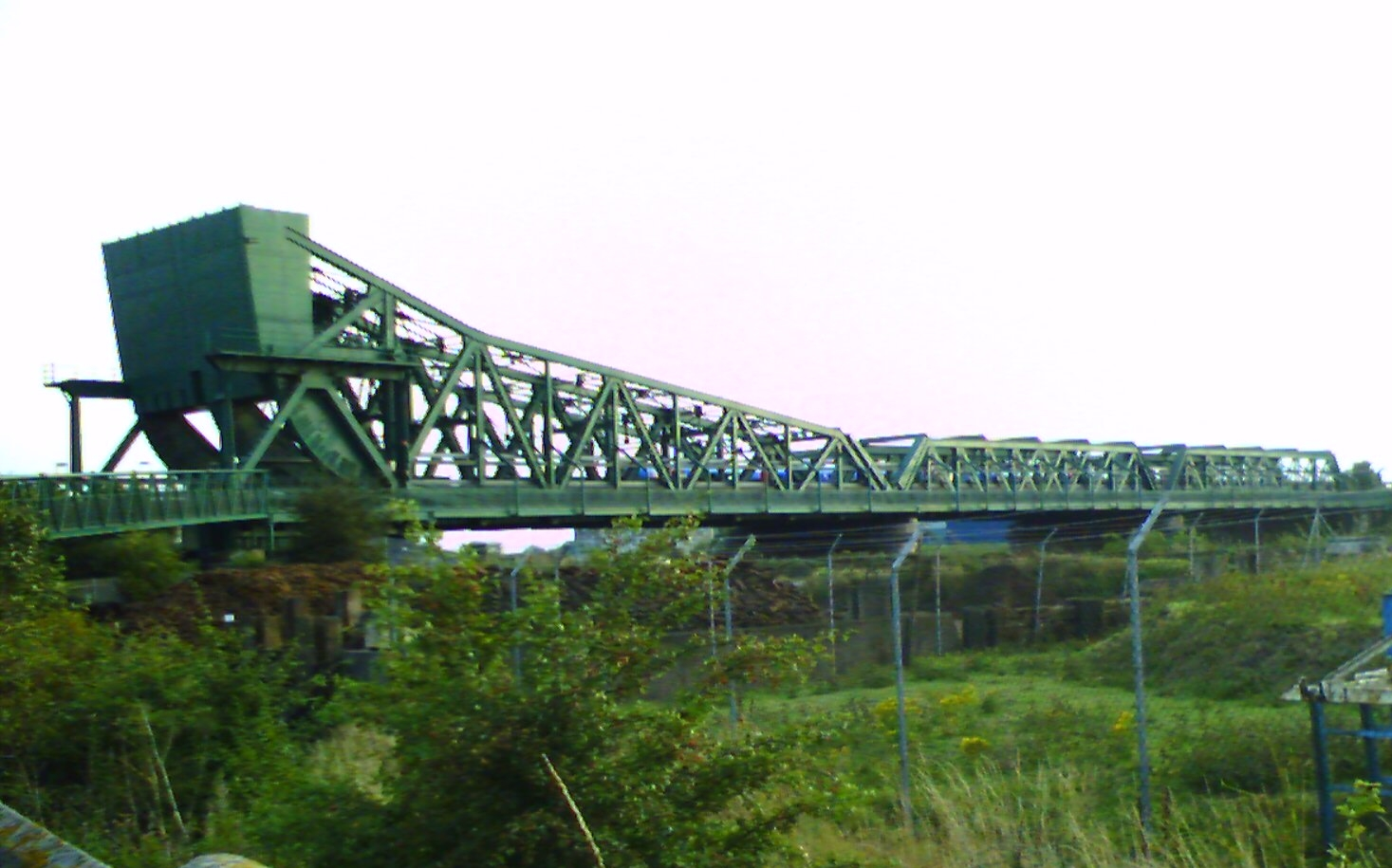
- Keadby Bridge

- Location within Lincolnshire
- Population: 1,930 (2011 census)
- OS grid reference: SE8311
  - London: 140 mi (230 km) S
- Civil parish: Keadby with Althorpe
- Unitary authority: North Lincolnshire
- Ceremonial county: Lincolnshire
- Region: Yorkshire and the Humber
- Country: England
- Sovereign state: United Kingdom
- Post town: SCUNTHORPE
- Postcode district: DN15-17
- Dialling code: 01724
- Police: Humberside
- Fire: Humberside
- Ambulance: East Midlands
- UK Parliament: Scunthorpe

Keadby is a small village and former civil parish, now in the parish of Keadby with Althorpe, in the North Lincolnshire district, in the ceremonial county of Lincolnshire, England. It is situated just off the A18, west of Scunthorpe, and on the west bank of the River Trent. The civil parish of Keadby with Althorpe had a population at the 2011 census of 1,930.

== History ==
The place-name 'Keadby' is first attested in 1185, where it appears as Ketebi in the Records of the Templars in England. The name means "Keti's by", 'Keti' being an Old Danish name and 'by' meaning a village or homestead in Old Scandinavian.

Keadby's economic significance lies in that it was chosen as the destination for the Stainforth and Keadby Canal, opened in 1802. The canal is now mostly a leisure waterway for pleasure boaters, with Keadby being at the "end of the line". There is a lock between the canal and the tidal River Trent. At Keadby are the Keadby Power Stations, and 'Port Services', a small port for inward-bound timber and scrap metal.

The village was served by the South Yorkshire Railway. A railway station served the village until the late 1870s-80s. When it was closed, another station opened at Althorpe instead. This is the closest one to the village.

In 1951 the parish of Keadby had a population of 627. On 1 April 1958 the parish was abolished and merged with Althorpe to form "Keadby with Althorpe".

== King George V Bridge ==
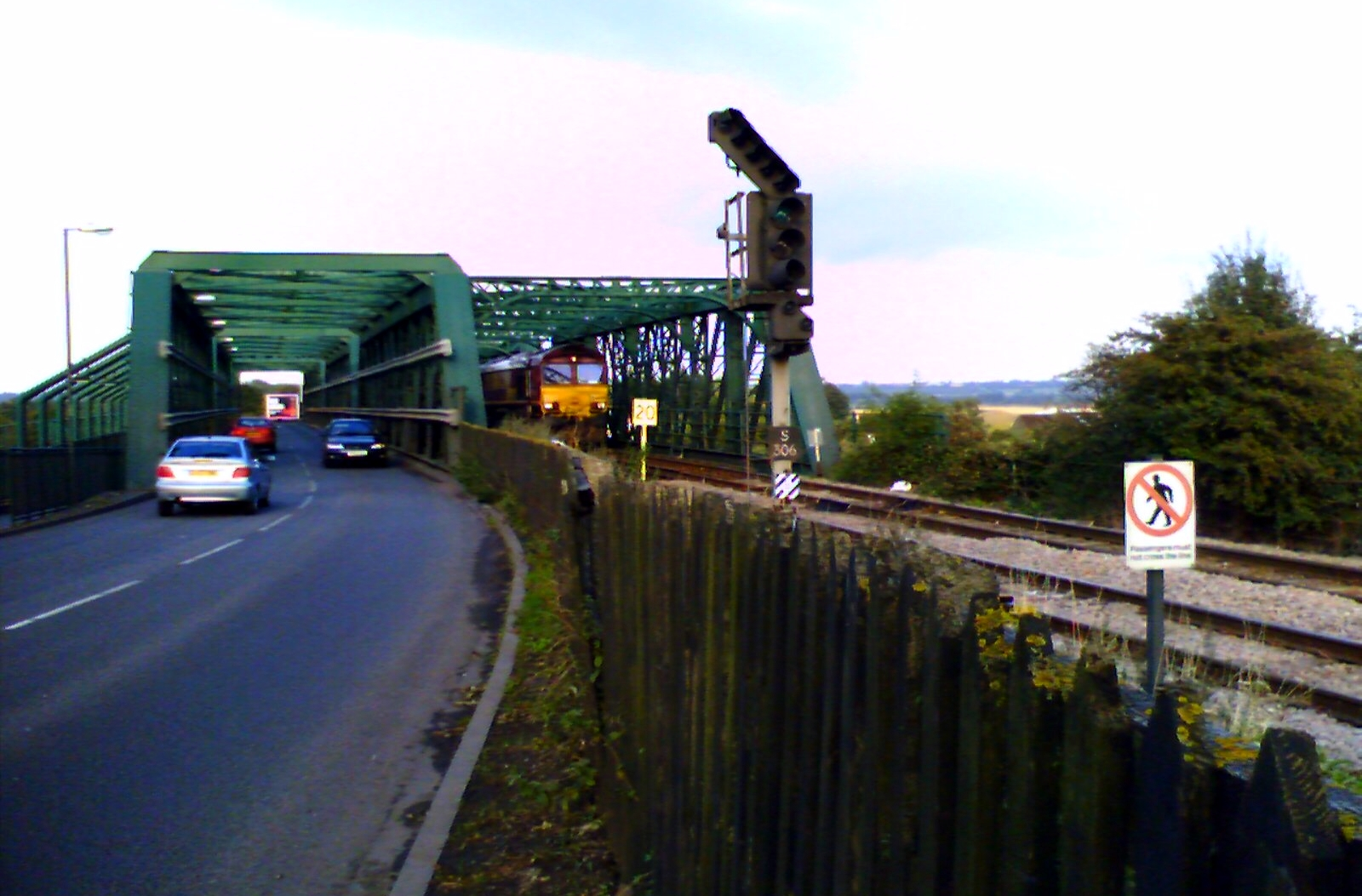
Keadby Bridge, from Althorpe railway station

The King George V Bridge (also known as Keadby Lifting Bridge) provides a crossing for twin rail lines, a road and a pedestrian walkway over the Trent, connecting the Isle of Axholme to Scunthorpe and the rest of North Lincolnshire. The bridge opened on 21 May 1916, at which time the 3,000-ton lifting span was Europe's heaviest bascule bridge. The lifting span was fixed in position in 1955 and no longer opens.

== Moveable bridges ==
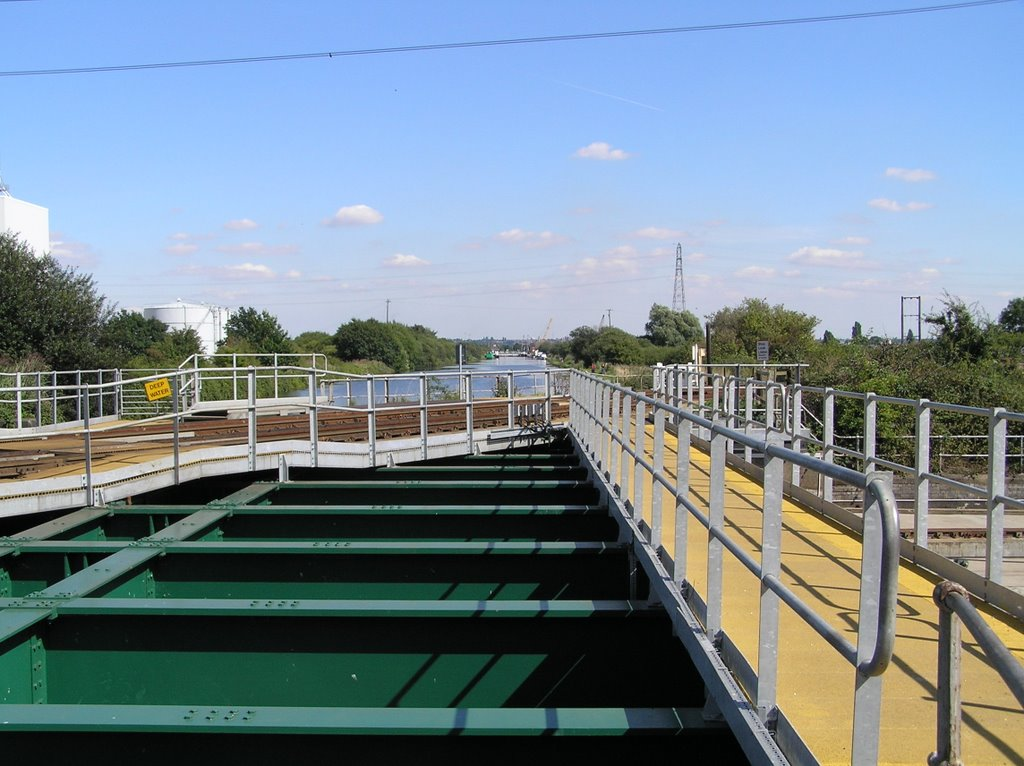
View towards Keadby with the Vazon Sliding Railway Bridge in the foreground

The King George V Bridge is not the only moveable bridge in the vicinity of Keadby. There are canal locks at the point where the Stainforth and Keadby Canal connects with the River Trent in Keadby. On the canal, just before these locks, the B1392 road crosses the canal over the Keadby Swing Bridge. Approximately 0.5 miles (0.8 km) farther along the canal, a railway line crosses the canal over the Keadby Sliding Bridge, also known as Vazon Sliding Railway Bridge. This is an unusual retractable bridge that can be rolled out of the line of the canal to allow boats through. Just beyond the sliding bridge is a small manually operated swing bridge.
