= Maud's Bridge railway station =

Former railway station in South Yorkshire, England

Maud's Bridge
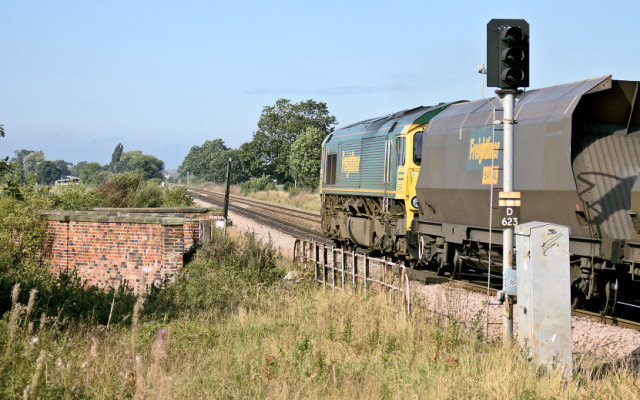
- Train near the site of the former station (2005)

General information
- Location: Thorne, Doncaster; England
- Coordinates: 53.60146°N 0.91647°W
- Grid reference: SE717122

Other information
- Status: Disused

History
- Original company: South Yorkshire Railway
- Pre-grouping: Manchester, Sheffield and Lincolnshire Railway

Key dates
- October 1859: Opened
- 1 October 1866: Closed
Location

Maud's Bridge was a small railway station built by the South Yorkshire Railway on its line between Thorne and Keadby. The station was situated between Thorne and Medge Hall.

== History ==
The South Yorkshire Railway (SYR) had a small system connecting Sheffield with Doncaster and some neighbouring towns; in 1855 it reached Thorne. An eastwards extension from Thorne to Keadby, parallel to the Keadby Canal (which was owned by the SYR), was commenced in December 1858, and opened on 10 September 1859. Originally there was only one intermediate station, at Crowle, but others were soon opened, including one at Maud's Bridge in October 1859.

Only a couple of miles to the east the line crosses the county boundary, leaving Yorkshire and entering Lincolnshire. It was at Maud's Bridge that the new 'straightened' track from Thorne South, opened in 1864, rejoined the original route along the canal. The station closed to passengers on 1 October 1866; in the meantime, the SYR had been leased to the Manchester, Sheffield and Lincolnshire Railway in June 1864.

Preceding station	Disused railways	Following station
Thorne (Old)	South Yorkshire Railway & River Dun Navigation; Doncaster to Keadby (canalside line)	Medge Hall Halt
Thorne South	South Yorkshire Railway; Doncaster to Keadby (straightened line)	Medge Hall Halt
