= Bramwith railway station =

Disused railway station in England

Bramwith

General information
- Location: Kirk Bramwith, Doncaster; England
- Coordinates: 53.59640°N 1.06317°W
- Grid reference: SE620114

Other information
- Status: Disused

History
- Original company: South Yorkshire Railway & River Dun Navigation

Key dates
- 1856: Opened
- 1866: Closed
Location

Bramwith railway station was a small station on the South Yorkshire Railway's line between Doncaster and Thorne. It served the village of Kirk Bramwith, near Doncaster, South Yorkshire, England. The original line followed closely the canal bank coming close to the village.

The original station was opened with the line on 7 July 1856, and closed on 1 October 1866. With the new "straightened" line being further from the village this station was not resited.

Preceding station	Disused railways	Following station
Barnby Dun	South Yorkshire Railway & River Dun Navigation; Doncaster to Thorne Railway	Stainforth
