= Thorne Waterside railway station =

Former railway station in England

Thorne Waterside

General information
- Location: Thorne, Doncaster; England
- Coordinates: 53.60888°N 0.96661°W
- Grid reference: SE684129

Other information
- Status: Disused

History
- Original company: South Yorkshire Railway & River Dun Navigation

Key dates
- 1856: Opened
- 1859: Closed
Location

Thorne Waterside railway station, sometimes referred to as "Thorne Lock" because of its location, was built by the South Yorkshire Railway as the terminus of its line from Doncaster. It was the first railway station to be opened in Thorne. The line was opened for goods traffic on 11 December 1855 and to passenger services on 7 July 1856. The station was built adjacent to the Stainforth to Keadby Canal and goods traffic was trans-shipped for forwarding on.

Passenger services lasted for around 3 years before being transferred to a new station, officially called "Thorne" but usually referred to as Thorne (Old) railway station, near the town centre. A third station, Thorne South, on the "straightened" replaced this from 1864, and is still open for business.

Preceding station	Disused railways	Following station
Stainforth	South Yorkshire Railway & River Dun Navigation; Doncaster to Thorne Railway	Terminus
Stainforth	South Yorkshire Railway & River Dun Navigation; Doncaster to Keadby line (1859-1866)	Crowle railway station
