= Thorne (Old) railway station =

Former railway station in South Yorkshire, England

Thorne (Old)

General information
- Location: Thorne, Doncaster; England
- Coordinates: 53.60916°N 0.96682°W
- Grid reference: SE684130

Other information
- Status: Disused

History
- Original company: South Yorkshire Railway & River Dun Navigation

Key dates
- 1859: Opened
- 1866: Closed
Location

Thorne (Old) railway station was the second railway station built by the South Yorkshire Railway to serve the town of Thorne, South Yorkshire, England. It was situated near the town centre on the first stage of the canal-side line to Keadby, which was opened in September 1859. The new line left the original South Yorkshire Railway just before arriving at Thorne Waterside taking a right-handed junction towards the town centre. When the line opened this station was the terminus of the line.

The canalside line fell out of use after new 'straightened' lines were opened in 1864, with a new station Thorne South about a third of a mile to the south. Another station Thorne North opened, to the north of the town centre, with the line to Hull in 1869.

Preceding station	Disused railways	Following station
Stainforth	South Yorkshire Railway & River Dun Navigation; Doncaster to Thorne line	Maud's Bridge
