= Godnow Bridge railway station =

Former railway station in Lincolnshire, England

Coordinates: 53.5954°N 0.8503°W

Godnow Bridge railway station was a small railway station on the line between Doncaster and Keadby, between Medge Hall Halt and Crowle. The area is shown on old maps as "Godknow Bridge". It was opened with the line from Thorne (Old) railway station in September 1859 and closed in 1917.

Preceding station	Disused railways	Following station
Medge Hall Halt	South Yorkshire Railway; Doncaster to Keadby line	Crowle
