= Listed buildings in Kirk Bramwith =

Kirk Bramwith is a civil parish in the metropolitan borough of Doncaster, South Yorkshire, England. The parish contains eleven listed buildings that are recorded in the National Heritage List for England. Of these, one is listed at Grade II*, the middle of the three grades, and the others are at Grade II, the lowest grade. The parish contains the villages of Kirk Bramwith and Braithwaite and the surrounding countryside. Most of the listed buildings are houses, farmhouses and farm buildings, and the others consist of a church, items in the churchyard, and a bridge.

== Key ==
Grade	Criteria
II*	Particularly important buildings of more than special interest
II	Buildings of national importance and special interest

== Buildings ==
Name and location	Photograph	Date	Notes	Grade
St Mary's Church; 53.59841°N 1.06469°W		12th century	The church, which dates mainly from the 14th and 15th centuries, is in magnesian limestone with a roof of Welsh slate and stone slate. It consists of a nave, a chancel, and a west tower with a north vestry. The tower has two stages, diagonal buttresses, a two-light west window and a slit window. Above are cruciform windows, a string course, a clock face on the west front, two-light bell openings, and an embattled parapet with crocketed corner pinnacles. The south doorway is Norman and has two orders of colonnettes with scalloped capitals, and two orders of arches, one with beakheads, and the other with chevrons.	II*
Stone coffin 53.59838°N 1.06485°W	—	Late medieval	The coffin is adjacent to the west of the tower of St Mary's Church, and is in magnesian limestone. It has straight sides, it tapers to the foot and has a shaped recess for the head.	II
Gate piers and wall, St Mary's Church; 53.59856°N 1.06493°W		c. 1700 (probable)	There is a pair of gate piers at each of the two entrances to the churchyard. They are in red brick with stone dressings, each pier rising from a stone block, and with a cornice and an obelisk finial. The piers are linked along the north side of the churchyard by a low brick wall with chamfered copings.	II
Stone font 53.59836°N 1.06470°W	—	15th century (probable)	The font is immediately to the south of St Mary's Church, and is in magnesian limestone. It is octagonal on a concave plinth, and has a band with a chamfer beneath plain sides.	II
Rose Cottage and outbuilding 53.59922°N 1.06288°W		Early to mid 18th century	The house and outbuildings are in red brick and limestone, partly roughcast, with cogged eaves courses, and a pantile roof with coped gables and shaped kneelers. There are two storeys and an L-shaped plan. The house has four bays, and the windows are horizontally-sliding sashes.	II
Drain Bridge; 53.59803°N 1.06566°W	—	Late 18th century (probable)	The bridge carries Low Lane over the drain between the New Junction Canal and the Stainforth and Keadby Canal. It is in limestone and sandstone, and consists of a single segmental arch rising from vertical abutment walls. The bridge has coped parapets continuing as splayed wing walls, ending at rounded piers.	II
Wood End Farmhouse; 53.61438°N 1.05279°W		Late 18th century	The farmhouse is in red brick, with dentilled eaves courses, and a tile roof with chamfered gable copings and shaped kneelers. There are two storeys and an attic, and three bays. The openings on the front have segmental-arched heads, and most of the windows are horizontally-sliding sashes. In the left return is a French window.	II
Farm building, Wood End Farm; 53.61457°N 1.05259°W		Late 18th century	A combination farm building in red brick, with stone slate eaves courses, cogged eaves, and a hipped roof partly of tile and partly of pantile. There are two storeys and an L-shaped plan, with ranges of four and five bays. On the left is a barn with double doors under a segmental arch, a hatch, and decorative vents. The cowhouse and stable on the right contain doorways with segmental brick arches.	II
Church Cottage; 53.59855°N 1.06514°W	—	c. 1800	A house in red brick with a pantile roof, it has two storeys, four bays, and a later single storey extension projecting on the left. On the front is a central doorway, and the windows are sashes.	II
Barn, Hermitage Farm; 53.60530°N 1.06666°W		Early 19th century	The barn is in red brick on a limestone plinth, with cogged eaves and a pantile roof. There are two storeys, and on the front facing the road are two doorways, one with a segmental-arched head, slit vents, and hatches. In the right return is a wooden hoist.	II
The Old Rectory; 53.59815°N 1.06427°W	—	1846	The rectory is in red brick with stone dressings, and a Welsh slate roof with coped gables and shaped kneelers, and it is in Tudor Revival style. There are two storeys and an irregular plan, with three bays on the front and left return, and a four-bay wing at the rear on the right. On the front is a porch with a Tudor arched opening and a dated plaque. The windows are mullioned and transomed sashes with hood moulds.	II
