= Hatfield & Stainforth railway station =

Railway station in South Yorkshire, England

Hatfield and Stainforth
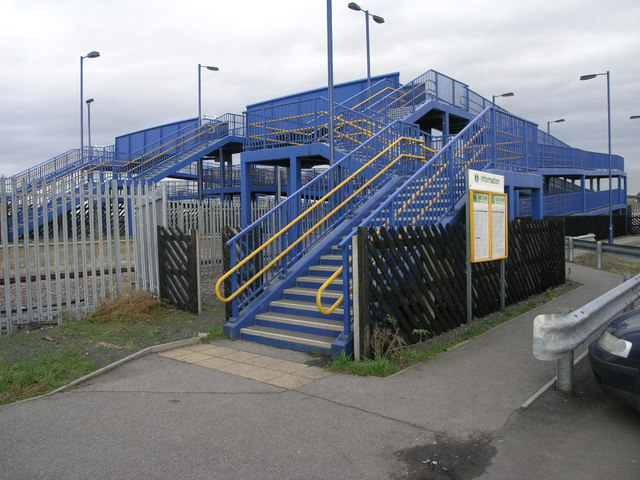

General information
- Location: Hatfield, Doncaster; England
- Coordinates: 53.588880°N 1.023360°W
- Grid reference: SE647106
- Managed by: Northern Trains
- Transit authority: South Yorkshire
- Platforms: 2

Other information
- Station code: HFS
- Fare zone: Doncaster
- Classification: DfT category F1

History
- Opened: 1866

Passengers
- 2020/21: ▼17,544
- 2021/22: ▲45,050
- 2022/23: ▼36,952
- Interchange: 5,788
- 2023/24: ▲53,242
- Interchange: ▲7,890
- 2024/25: ▲72,000
- Interchange: ▲9,174
Location
Notes
- Passenger statistics from the Office of Rail and Road

Hatfield and Stainforth railway station serves the towns of Hatfield and Stainforth in South Yorkshire, England. It is located 6 3/4 miles (10.9 km) north east of the main Doncaster station.

The original station, known until the 1990s as "Stainforth and Hatfield" and was built in 1866 as a replacement for the South Yorkshire Railway's Stainforth when their line was brought to its present alignment. The station was renamed Hatfield and Stainforth in the 1990s when it was considered that Hatfield was the larger of the two and had the larger population.

The Doncaster Core Strategy includes support for "refurbishment of the railway station and the creation of a rail/bus/park and ride interchange".

== Facilities ==
The station is unstaffed but has a ticket machine. There are no substantial buildings remaining on the platforms other than standard waiting shelters and the fully accessible footbridge linking them to the station entrance and car park. The former station building adjacent to the entrance is still standing - the single customer help point is located on one of its outer walls. Train running information is provided by digital information screens and timetable posters.

== Service ==
The majority of services at Hatfield and Stainforth are operated by Northern Trains.

The typical off-peak service in trains per hour is:

- 1 or 2 tph to Doncaster
- 1 tph to Hull via Goole
- 1 tp2h to Scunthorpe

There is also a single daily service between Cleethorpes and Liverpool Lime Street which is operated by TransPennine Express. This service runs towards Liverpool in the early morning and towards Cleethorpes in the late evening.

On Sundays, there is an hourly service between Doncaster and Hull with no service to Scunthorpe.

There is also a freight-only line to the Wakefield Line to South Elmsall, Wakefield and Leeds, with additional goods lines passing behind both platforms.

In February 2013, the line northeast of Hatfield and Stainforth station towards Thorne was blocked by the Hatfield Colliery landslip, with all services over the section halted. The line reopened in July 2013.

Preceding station	National Rail	Following station
Kirk Sandall	Northern Trains Hull and Doncaster Branch	Thorne North
Kirk Sandall	Northern Trains South Humberside Main Line Monday-Saturday only	Thorne South
Kirk Sandall	TransPennine Express South TransPennine (Cleethorpes - Liverpool Lime Street) Limited Service	Thorne South
