= Stainforth and Keadby Canal =

Canal in Yorkshire and Lincolnshire, England

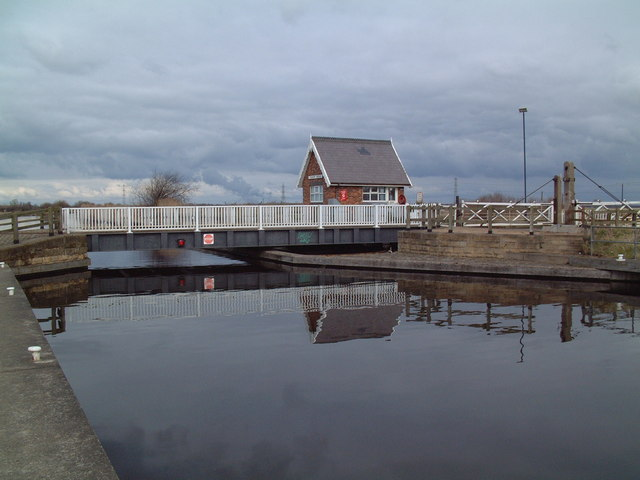
- Godnow Swing Bridge with level crossing control box
- Interactive map of Stainforth and Keadby Canal

Specifications
- Maximum boat length: 61 ft 8 in (18.80 m)
- Maximum boat beam: 17 ft 0 in (5.18 m)
- Locks: 3
- Status: Operational
- Navigation authority: Canal & River Trust

History
- Original owner: Stainforth and Keadby Canal Navigation Co
- Principal engineer: John Thompson, Daniel Servant
- Date of act: 1793
- Date of first use: 1802

Geography
- Start point: Bramwith
- End point: Keadby
- Connects to: River Don Navigation, River Trent

The Stainforth and Keadby Canal is a navigable canal in South Yorkshire and Lincolnshire, England. It connects the River Don Navigation at Bramwith to the River Trent at Keadby, by way of Stainforth, Thorne and Ealand, near Crowle. It opened in 1802, passed into the control of the River Don Navigation in 1849, and within a year was controlled by the first of several railway companies. It became part of the Sheffield and South Yorkshire Navigation, an attempt to remove several canals from railway control, in 1895. There were plans to upgrade it to take larger barges and to improve the port facilities at Keadby, but the completion of the New Junction Canal in 1905 made this unnecessary, as Goole could easily be reached and was already a thriving port.

The canal was a centre for boatbuilding between 1858, when Richard Dunston moved his yard to Thorne from Torksey, and 1984 when the yard closed. Dunston's company were pioneers in the use of welded construction and innovative tug propulsion systems. The operation was always restricted by the size of Keadby Lock, although vessels longer than the lock could pass through when the river was level with the canal and both sets of gates could be opened. The largest ship to be built required Dunston's to build a dam across the canal, as the canal company feared that it might get stuck in the lock, resulting in flooding and draining of the canal.

The canal passes through a region which is largely rural, much of which is drained artificially. For most of its length, it is flanked by the North Soak Drain and the South Soak Drain, because it disrupted the established drainage scheme. Thorne Moors lie to the north and Hatfield Chase lies to the south. Until its demise in 1966, the canal was crossed by the Axholme Joint Railway at Ealand. The swing bridge was retained for several years after closure, so that stators from the nearby Keadby Power Station could be taken away for repairs, as there were no road bridges which could support the weight.

== History ==
The River Don, which flows through Sheffield and Doncaster, had originally split into two channels below Stainforth, one of which emptied into the River Trent near Adlingfleet, close to its junction with the River Ouse, while the other headed north to join the River Aire near Rawcliffe. Following the work of the Dutch drainage engineer Cornelius Vermuyden to drain Hatfield Chase, the Adlingfleet outlet was closed off, and the channel to the River Aire, passing through Newbridge, was improved to take all of the flow. The scheme was not entirely successful, and after severe flooding near Sykehouse, Fishlake and Snaith, accompanied by riots, a new channel was cut between Newbridge and the River Ouse near what became Goole. The old course of the Don gradually silted up. Navigation on the Don was improved by the construction of cuts and locks, with the lowest lock situated at Stainforth. From there to the Ouse, boats used the Dutch River, Vermuyden's artificial drain, which was hazardous due to its fast flows, its tides and its shallowness at times.

Stainforth and Keadby Canal Act 1793
- Act of Parliament
- Parliament of Great Britain
- Long title: An Act for making and maintaining a Navigable Canal from the River Dun Navigation Cut, at or near Stainforth, in the West Riding of the County of York, to join and communicate with the River Trent, at or near Keadby, in the County of Lincoln; and also a Collateral Cut from the said Canal to join the said River Dun, in the Parish of Thorne, in the said Riding.
- Citation: 33 Geo. 3. c. 117
- Territorial extent: Great Britain

Dates
- Royal assent: 7 June 1793
- Commencement: 7 June 1793 (Note: The Acts of Parliament (Commencement) Act 1793.)
Other legislation
Amended by	Stainforth and Keadby Canal Act 1798; Stainforth and Keadby Canal Purchase Act 1849

Status: Amended

Text of statute as originally enacted

Stainforth and Keadby Canal Act 1798
- Act of Parliament
- Parliament of Great Britain
- Long title: An act for amending and enlarging the powers of an act, passed in the thirty-third year of the reign of his present Majesty, for making and maintaining a navigable canal from the river Dunn navigation cut, at or near Stainforth, in the west riding of the county of York, to join and communicate with the river Trent, at or near Keadby, in the county of Lincoln; and also a collateral cut from the said canal, to join the said river Dunn, in the parish of Thorne, in the said riding upon.
- Citation: 38 Geo. 3. c. xlvii
- Territorial extent: Great Britain

Dates
- Royal assent: 1 June 1798
- Commencement: 1 June 1798
Other legislation
Amends	Stainforth and Keadby Canal Act 1793

Status: Amended

Text of statute as originally enacted

The idea of reconnecting the Don to the Trent was first raised in 1763, when James Brindley assisted the manager of the River Don Navigation to survey a route for a canal to do this. In 1772 a second survey was made, this time by John Thompson, the Don Navigation's engineer, for a canal from Stainforth to Althorpe, some 1.5 miles (2.4 km) above Keadby on the River Trent. An agreement to build the canal, which would have had three locks and cost £14,614, was reached, but no further action occurred. The plan was revived in 1792, by which time the cost had risen to £24,200, and an act of Parliament to authorise the work, the Stainforth and Keadby Canal Act 1793 (33 Geo. 3. c. 117), was obtained. This allowed the Stainforth and Keadby Canal Navigation Company to raise £24,200 by issuing shares, and a further £12,000 if necessary. Work began at the Keadby end in late 1793. A second act of Parliament, the Stainforth and Keadby Canal Act 1798 (38 Geo. 3. c. xlvii), allowed the company to raise an additional £20,000 from shareholders, instead of the original £12,000, and to raise £10,000 by mortgage. The canal opened without ceremony in early 1802.

The canal had a lock at Thorne and another where it joined the River Trent at Keadby. This lock had four sets of gates, so that it could be used whether the level of the river was higher or lower than that of the canal. It could take keels up to 81 by 22.5 feet (24.7 by 6.9 m), which could carry up to 200 tons.

=== Development ===
Stainforth and Keadby Canal Purchase Act 1849
- Act of Parliament
- Parliament of the United Kingdom
- Long title: An Act to vest the Stainforth and Keadby Canal in the Company of Proprietors of the Navigation of the River Dun.
- Citation: 12 & 13 Vict. c. xxix
- Territorial extent: United Kingdom

Dates
- Royal assent: 26 June 1849
- Commencement: 26 June 1849
Other legislation
Amends	River Dun Navigation Act 1726; River Dun Navigation Act 1732; Stainforth and Keadby Canal Act 1793
Relates to	South Yorkshire Railway and River Dun Company's Transfer Act 1864

Status: Current legislation

Text of statute as originally enacted

In 1828, there was a proposal to build a canal from West Stockwith on the River Trent to the River Don at Doncaster, which would have bypassed the Stainforth and Keadby. There was also a plan for a lower Don bypass, to connect direct to the Goole Canal, avoiding the difficult Dutch River. Neither scheme progressed any further, but the Keadby end of the canal was improved, and a new deep water jetty was constructed on the Trent in 1833. Traffic improved, with boats using the canal as an easier way to reach the Don than the Dutch River. The Don Navigation Company then proposed a new canal from Stainforth to the River Ouse at Swinefleet in 1836. They needed to buy 2 miles (3.2 km) of the Stainforth and Keadby from the Don towards Stainforth, and started to negotiate, while applying for an act of Parliament. The Stainforth and Keadby opposed the bill, and an agreement was reached in May 1836 that the Don would buy the whole canal for £48,000. A bill to authorise the sale was opposed by some of the Stainforth and Keadby shareholders and was rejected by the House of Lords. After several more abortive plans at amalgamation, where the Stainforth and Keadby pulled out at the last minute, agreement was finally reached, and the Don Navigation took control of the canal on 1 January 1849. A year later, under the Stainforth and Keadby Canal Purchase Act 1849 (12 & 13 Vict. c. xxix), it became part of the South Yorkshire Railway and River Dun Company, after the Don Navigation and the Doncaster and Goole Railway companies merged.

Under the terms of the South Yorkshire Railway and River Dun Company's Vesting Act 1874 (37 & 38 Vict. c.cxxxi), the South Yorkshire company was absorbed into the Manchester, Sheffield and Lincolnshire Railway. Despite the railway competition, traffic levels remained healthy, with the waterways carrying a total of 982,000 tons in 1878, but there was a growing dissatisfaction with the situation, particularly the high tolls compared to the railways, and the refusal to allow steam haulage, which had been in use on the neighbouring Aire and Calder Navigation for over 50 years. In an attempt to improve the situation, the Sheffield and South Yorkshire Canal Company Ltd was formed in 1888, with the intention of buying back the canals from the railway company, and upgrading them to offer effective competition to the railways. As a result of their efforts, the Sheffield and South Yorkshire Navigation Company was created by an act of Parliament, the Sheffield and South Yorkshire Navigation Act 1889 (52 & 53 Vict. c. cxc), dated 26 August 1889, with powers to raise £1.5 million to purchase and improve four canals. These were the Sheffield Canal, the River Don Navigation, the Dearne and Dove Canal and the Stainforth and Keadby Canal. The intention was to upgrade the Don and the Stainforth and Keadby to take 300 or 400 ton barges, to investigate the use of compartment boats, and to build a new port facility at Keadby, where coal could be trans-shipped to seagoing vessels. Negotiations with the railway company were long and bitter, and the Navigation company only managed to raise £625,000 of the £1.14 million purchase price, with the result that although ownership of the waterways was transferred to them, the railway company still nominated five of the ten directors, and thus retained significant control.

During the protracted negotiations, the company had also been talking to the Aire and Calder about compartment boats, which resulted in a proposal to jointly fund and build a canal from Bramwith to the Aire and Calder. The 5.5-mile (8.9 km) New Junction Canal was authorised in 1891, and finally opened in 1905. This removed the need to build a new port at Keadby, and the planned upgrade to take larger vessels was also shelved, because the company were unable to raise significant working capital. Despite the lack of investment and the difficulties of the First World War, the waterways were still quite busy, with traffic recovering from 381,727 tons in 1926, the year of the general strike, to over 800,000 tons in 1937. Bramwith lock, the first on the Stainforth and Keadby, was lengthened in 1932, and a new colliery layby was constructed to enable compartment boats to reach Hatfield Main Colliery. Stainforth lock, which connected the canal to the River Don, was closed in 1939. The winter of 1947 was particularly severe, and the Stainforth and Keadby was closed for a period due to ice. After the Second World War, the canals of the Sheffield and South Yorkshire Navigation were nationalised on 1 January 1948, together with most other operational canals in Britain.

They were initially managed by the British Transport Commission, but control passed to British Waterways with the passing of the Transport Act 1962, which also disbanded the Transport Commission. The Transport Act 1968 and Transport Act 1983 divided British canals into Commercial waterways, which were still carrying commercial traffic, cruising waterways, which had potential for leisure use, and remainder waterways, for which no economic use could be seen at the time. The Stainforth and Keadby was designated as a commercial waterway, and traffic was restricted to working boats carrying freight. With the steady demise of freight traffic, British Waterways encouraged the use of the canals for leisure cruising, walking and fishing, and later recognised their environmental value. Following the cessation of coal carrying from Hatfield Main colliery, and the closure of Dunston's boatyard at Thorne, all use of the canal is now by leisure boaters. A further change of ownership took place in 2012 with the creation of the Canal & River Trust, which took over all of the assets of British Waterways.

== Boatbuilding ==
Large numbers of boats were built beside the Stainforth and Keadby Canal. Richard Dunston set up a boatyard at Thorne, on the north bank just below the lock, in 1858, after selling his previous boatyard at Torksey. He initially constructed clinker-built sailing barges, capable of carrying up to 80 tons. The boatyard was fairly self-contained, using timber which was grown locally and was sawn by hand at the yard. It included a ropewalk, which made ropes for many industries in the locality, as well as for rigging of the boats, and supplied sails, masts and chandlery to much of the Humber region. Gradually, carvel-built barges with their smoother hulls replaced clinker-built ones, and boat sizes became more standard, with Sheffield-sized keels and larger sloops. Shortly after Richard's grandson took over the yard in 1910, it was remodelled to build iron and steel ships, and only one wooden boat was built subsequently.

One of the issues with the yard was that the size of boats that could be built was restricted by the locks at either side of the site. Sheffield-sized boats were around 61.5 by 15.5 feet (18.7 by 4.7 m), and could leave the yard either by passing through Thorne Lock and on to the Don Navigation, or by travelling to Keadby and entering the Trent. Sloops were restricted to the Keadby route, because of their larger size, and the largest boats built at Thorne before the 1940s were 700-brake-horsepower (520 kW) tugs, 300-ton coasters and 300-ton lighters. From 1933, the yard began experimenting with welded rather than riveted construction, and their first all-welded steam tugs were constructed for the Admiralty in 1942. They continued to lead the field with developments in tug propulsion in the 1960s, and by the late 1970s had built seventeen tugs with Kort nozzle or Kort rudder steering and twenty tugs with Voith-Schneider propulsion systems at Thorne. With the yard at Hessle on the Humber, bought from Henry Scarr in 1932, they were one of the largest un-nationalised shipbuilders in Britain.

The Empire Laird, a self-trimming diesel collier measuring 140 by 21.5 feet (42.7 by 6.6 m) with a draught of 10 feet (3.0 m), was one of the largest vessels ever constructed at Thorne. It was built for the Admiralty in 1943 for use in the Bristol area, delivering coal to power stations. It was fitted with a 275 bhp (205 kW) Crossley engine and a single propeller. Keadby Lock is much shorter than the ship, and so it had to sail through when the river made a level with the canal, and both sets of gates could be opened at the same time. However, the canal company were worried that because of its width, it might jam in the lock, which would cause flooding of the hinterland at high tide, and draining of the canal at low tide. Dunston's had to build a dam across the canal beyond the lock, to prevent both consequences. Once built, the ship successfully passed through the lock, and the dam was removed. During the Second World War, Dunston's designed and built TID (Tugs in Dock) tugs. They were constructed from eight pre-fabricated sections, manufactured by companies who were not normally involved in shipbuilding. The sections weighted less than 6 tons, with a maximum size of 10 feet (3.0 m) by 17 feet (5.2 m) by 13 feet (4.0 m), and were delivered by lorry to the yard. There they were joined together by welders, many of whom were women, and fitted with steam engines. The first TID tug was completed in February 1943, and for more than a year, one left the yard every five days.

In the early 1980s, there were still 80 workers involved in construction work at Thorne, and 15 other staff. A total of 1,358 vessels were built there between 1932 and the end of shipbuilding in 1984. The yard closed completely in 1987, and had been cleared by 1993. Subsequently, it has become a housing estate, where a number of the roads reflect the former use of the site, including Capstan Rope Way and Dunstan Drive, although the spelling of "Dunston" is not quite the same.

== Route ==
The Stainforth and Keadby follows a fairly direct course from west to east, running for 14.9 miles (24.0 km) from Bramwith Junction, where it meets the New Junction Canal and the River Don Navigation, to Keadby Lock, where it joins the River Trent. There is a lock at both ends and one part way along at Thorne, which is smaller than the other two. Maximum boat sizes over the entire canal are 61.7 feet (18.8 m) long by 17 feet (5.2 m) wide. Boats can draw 7.25 feet (2.21 m) and headroom is restricted to 10.9 feet (3.3 m).

The New Junction Canal and the Stainforth and Keadby Canal leave the end of the River Don Navigation, and both head broadly north east, but whereas the New Junction Canal continues in a straight line for its entire length, the Stainforth and Keadby gradually turns to the east. Shortly after the junction, Bramwith Lock lowers the level of the canal. The River Don, after flowing under the New Junction Canal, joins the canal and continues close to the north bank for several miles. Bramwith Swing Bridge is the first of several swing bridges, most of which are operated by boaters. The tiny village of Kirk Bramwith is just to the north of the canal and river. Its notable buildings include the church of St Mary, much of which dates from the fourteenth and fifteenth centuries, with a twelfth-century southern doorway. The building is a grade II* listed structure. The hamlet of South Bramwith lies to the south, with Bramwith Hall, a grade II listed 3-storey, 5-bay eighteenth-century country house, which was rebuilt in the early nineteenth century, situated close to the canal. The canal passes to the north of Stainforth, where there is a fixed bridge. A basin, with its former connection to the Don, is now used as moorings by Thorne Cruising Club. This first section is now generally considered to be part of the Stainforth and Keadby Canal, although it was originally part of the Don Navigation as far as Stainforth Lock.

After a large pipe bridge, the canal widens to form a loading bay where coal from Hatfield Main Colliery was transferred to barges. A railway, which has now been dismantled, connected the site to the mine. About 1 mile (1.6 km) from Stainforth, the Don turns towards the north, while the canal continues to the east, passing under the M18 motorway. As it approaches Thorne, it passes under the Hull and Doncaster Branch railway near Thorne North railway station. Immediately beyond the bridge is Stanilands Marina, followed by Thorne Lock, with a swing bridge crossing its head. The canal turns briefly to the south, to pass under the A614 road and the Doncaster to Cleethorpes railway near Thorne South railway station. The railway remains close to the northern bank for most of the way to Keadby. There is another marina near Wykewell Lift Bridge, and after Moor's Swing Bridge, the canal crosses open countryside.

The land besides the canal is low lying, and there is evidence of strip farming, with a series of farms each with a long thin strip of land behind it. In this case the strips were 1 acre (0.4 ha) strips, approximately 220 by 22 yards (201 by 20 m) in size. The land is crossed by drainage ditches. To the north are those of Thorne Moors, while to the south, the drains include Boating Dyke, which was used for the export of peat during the seventeenth and eighteenth centuries. The network of peat canals were largely destroyed by the cutting of the canal in 1802, and Boating Dyke now feeds into the North Engine Drain, which crosses Hatfield Chase and discharges into the River Trent at Keadby. After Maud's Swing Bridge is a long straight stretch, with the railway on the north bank. The North Soak Drain and South Soak Drain flank the canal on both sides, and were built because the canal disrupted the natural drainage of the area. Near to Crook o'Moor Swing Bridge was Medge Hall peat works, which exported peat from the moors by railway until it was closed in 1966.

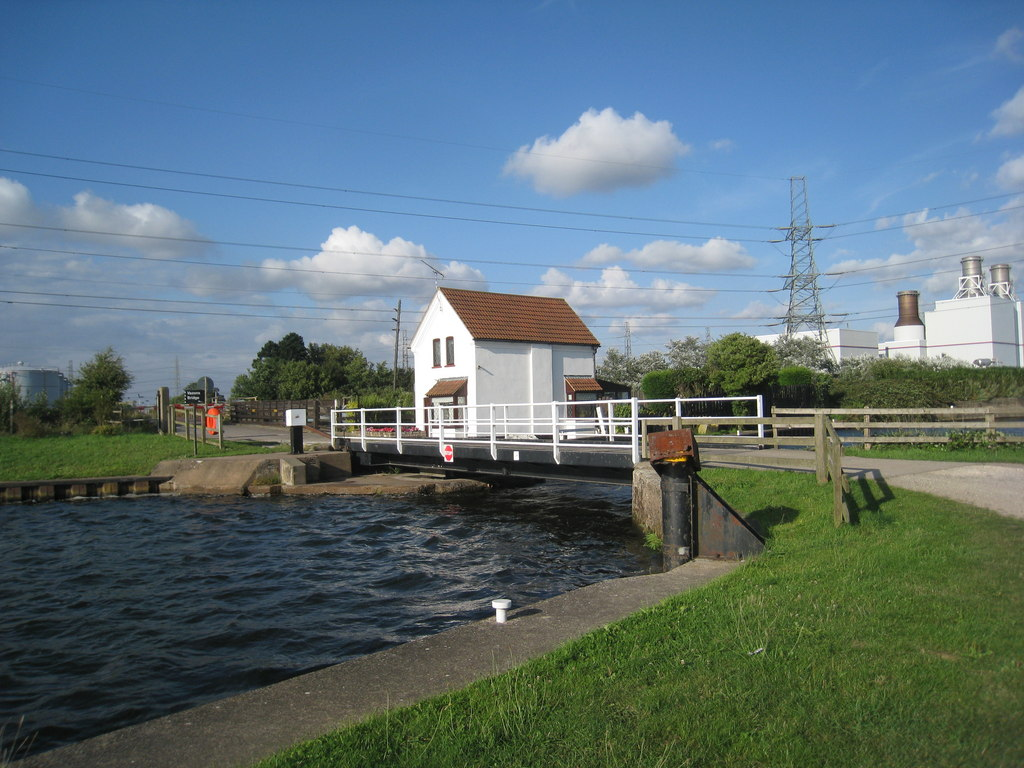
Vazon Swing Bridge, which crosses the canal near the sliding railway bridge. The gas-fired power station is on the right.

Just before Godnow Swing Bridge, the northern soak drain crosses to the north side of the railway. As the canal approaches Ealand there are some large lakes to the north, which are now used for sailing. Crowle Bridge carries the A161 road over the railway and the canal, and Crowle railway station is sandwiched between the canal and the North Soak Drain. A little further east are the remains of Crowle railway bridge. It carried the Axholme Joint Railway over the canal, and consisted of four arches built from bricks, with a central swinging section, to allow keels to sail along the canal. The bridge was retained after the railway was closed in 1966, because stators from Keadby Power Station were too heavy to be transported over the A161 road bridge. The stators were carried by road to Ealand, loaded onto the railway, and crossed the bridge to Belton, where they were transferred back to a road vehicle. The process became unnecessary when Lindsey County Council rebuilt the A161 bridge in 1970, and the railway bridge was demolished in 1972.

On the outskirts of Keadby, there are two more bridges. Vazon Swing Bridge is a conventional swing bridge, but the railway crosses to the south side of the canal on a sliding bridge. The bridge deck is only around 2 feet (0.6 m) above the level of the water. When boats need to pass, the deck is winched sideways, and clears the waterway because it crosses it at an angle. The bridge was built in 1925–26 and rebuilt in 2004, and is controlled from a signal box nearby. Beyond the bridge, Keadby gas-fired power station is located on the north bank. The final bridge is Keadby Swing Bridge, situated at the head of Keadby Lock. The lock controls passage to the River Trent, which is tidal at this point, and it therefore has four sets of gates. The main structure of the lock dates from the opening of the canal, and is grade II listed. The gates and sills were replaced in 1932. There are wharves on the river for larger ships, and Keadby pumping station is situated just to the south. It was built in the 1930s, and pumps water from Hatfield Chase into the Trent. Since 1945 it has also dealt with water from the North and South Soak Drains. When the South Yorkshire Railway opened their line along the banks of the canal in 1859, it terminated beside the lock, but was diverted to the south to cross the Trent on Keadby Bridge in 1864.

== Points of interest ==
Point	Coordinates (Links to map resources)	OS Grid Ref	Notes
Keadby lock	53.5928°N 0.7405°W	SE834114	
Sliding Railway Bridge	53.5933°N 0.7534°W	SE826114	
A161 Crowle Bridge	53.5896°N 0.8196°W	SE782109	
Thorne lock	53.6108°N 0.9703°W	SE682131	
Stainforth moorings	53.6039°N 1.0270°W	SE644123	site of lock
Bramwith lock	53.5899°N 1.0726°W	SE614107	

== See also ==
- Canals of Great Britain
- History of the British canal system

== Bibliography ==
- Booth, A. J. (1998). Peat Railways of Thorne and Hatfield Moors. Industrial Railway Society. ISBN 1-901556-04-2.
- Cory, Vernon (1985). Hatfield and Axholme – An Historical Review. Providence Press. ISBN 0-903803-15-1.
- Cumberlidge, Jane (2009). Inland Waterways of Great Britain (8th Ed.). Imray Laurie Norie and Wilson. ISBN 978-1-84623-010-3.
- Hadfield, Charles (1972). The Canals of Yorkshire and North East England (Vol 1). David and Charles. ISBN 0-7153-5719-0.
- Hadfield, Charles (1973). The Canals of Yorkshire and North East England (Vol 2). David and Charles. ISBN 0-7153-5975-4.
- Judge, C. W. (1994). The Axholme Joint Railway. Oakwood Press. ISBN 978-0-85361-441-8.
- Mosse, Jonathan (December 2012). "Cruising in South Yorkshire". Waterways World. ISSN 0309-1422.
- Nicholson (2006). Nicholson Guides Vol 6: Nottingham, York and the North East. Harper Collins. ISBN 978-0-00-721114-2.
- Taylor, Mike (2009). Richard Dunston Limited of Thorne & Hessle. Barnsley: Pen and Sword Books. ISBN 978-1-84563-094-2.
- Young, Niki May (3 July 2012). "Canal and River Trust takes over from British Waterways". Civilsociety.co.uk. Archived from the original on 5 February 2014.
