= Stainforth railway station =

Former railway station in South Yorkshire, England

Stainforth

General information
- Location: Stainforth, Doncaster; England
- Coordinates: 53.60179°N 1.03143°W
- Grid reference: SE641121

Other information
- Status: Disused

History
- Original company: South Yorkshire Railway & River Dun Navigation

Key dates
- 1856: Opened
- 1866: Closed
Location

Stainforth railway station was a station on the South Yorkshire Railway's line between Doncaster and Thorne, serving the town of Stainforth, South Yorkshire, England.

== History and description ==
The original SYR line from Doncaster to Thorne followed closely the Stainforth and Keadby Canal and opened for goods traffic on 11 December 1855. The original passenger station opened with the coming of passenger services to the line on 7 July 1856 and closed on 1 October 1866 when the station was resited on the 'straightened' line.

A new station opened on the realigned route away from the canal as Stainforth and Hatfield, but was renamed Hatfield and Stainforth in the 1990s.

Preceding station	Disused railways	Following station
Bramwith	South Yorkshire Railway & River Dun Navigation; Doncaster to Thorne Railway	Thorne Lock
