= Stainforth, South Yorkshire =

Town and civil parish in South Yorkshire, England

Coordinates: 53.5958°N 1.0253°W

Stainforth
- Town and civil parish
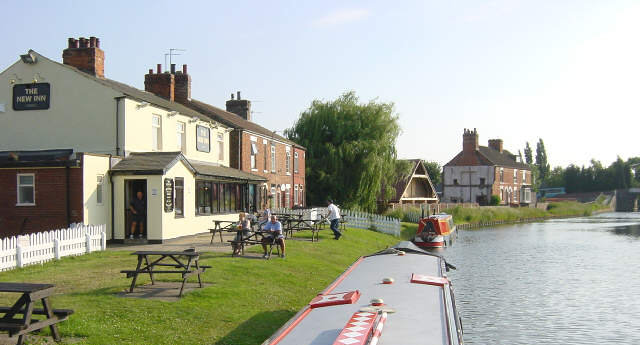
- The New Inn on the bank of the Stainforth and Keadby Canal

- Location within South Yorkshire
- Area: 3.47 sq mi (9.0 km^{2})
- Population: 6,282 (2011 census)
  - Density: 1,810/sq mi (700/km^{2})
- OS grid reference: SE646115
- Civil parish: Stainforth
- Metropolitan borough: City of Doncaster
- Metropolitan county: South Yorkshire
- Region: Yorkshire and the Humber
- Country: England
- Sovereign state: United Kingdom
- Post town: DONCASTER
- Postcode district: DN7
- Dialling code: 01302
- Police: South Yorkshire
- Fire: South Yorkshire
- Ambulance: Yorkshire
- UK Parliament: Doncaster North

Stainforth (/ˈsteɪnfərθ/) is a town and civil parish in the City of Doncaster, in South Yorkshire, England. It is around 7 miles (11 km) north-east of Doncaster, close to Hatfield and Thorne. It had a population of 6,342 in the 2001 census, reducing slightly to 6,282 at the 2011 census.

== Etymology ==
The place-name means 'stony ford' from Old English stanig 'stony' and ford 'ford'. Its name was recorded as 'Stenforde' in the Domesday Book in 1086 and was later recorded as 'Staneforde' in 1428.

== History ==
Stainforth was established in the Anglo Saxon period and is recorded in the Domesday Book (1086), as a small settlement of 7 households. In 1066, it was under Earl Harold, but after the Norman Conquest it was given by William the Conqueror to William of (de) Warenne. In 1348, Stainforth received a Royal Charter, entitling it to hold a weekly market on Fridays and an annual ten-day fair. The town briefly thrived as a commercial centre and port and attracted traders from as far afield as the Isle of Axholme, but the market soon slumped as Bawtry grew in importance. George Porter (later Lord Porter of Luddenham), the Nobel prize winning chemist, was born in the town in 1920.

Stainforth railway station opened on 7 July 1856, and closed on 1 October 1866. The town is now served by Hatfield and Stainforth railway stations.

Speedway racing was staged at the Greyhound Stadium in the town in 1930. The original "professional" promotion failed, and a few meetings organised by a riders' co-operative were staged at the venue.

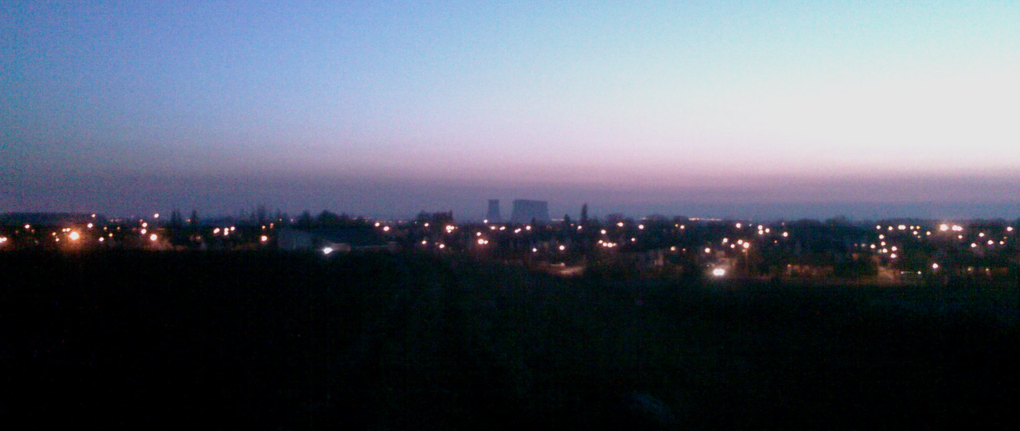
Stainforth by night, from Hatfield Main. The towers of the former power station at Thorpe Marsh can be seen on the horizon

More recently, Stainforth was a mining village, with the Hatfield Main Colliery at its centre. The colliery was open for around 90 years, from when it entered full production in 1921 up to its closing in 2015. During the 1972 national strike, a miner from Hatfield Colliery, Freddie Matthews, was killed by a truck while picketing during the strike, which led to a huge crowd at his funeral.

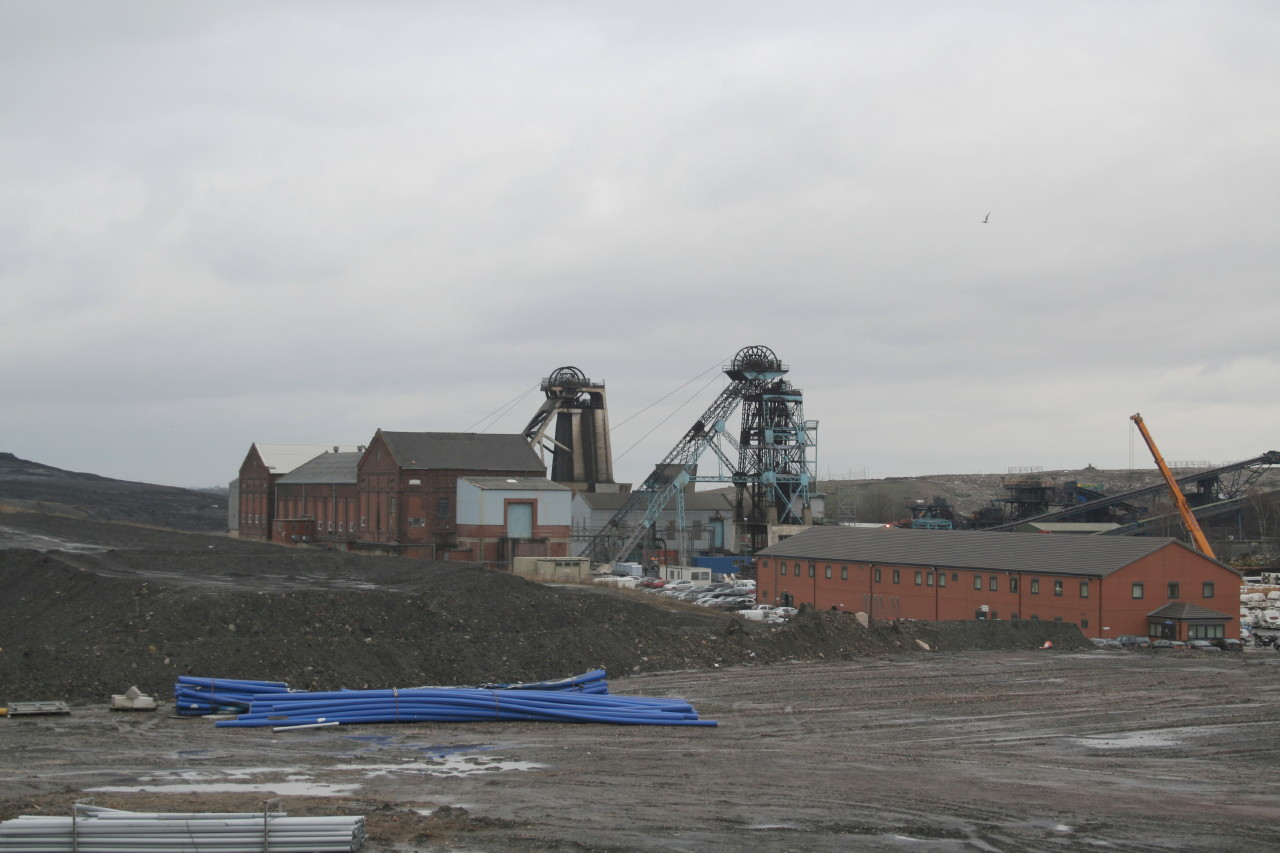
The Colliery

The colliery began reopening in 2006 and resumed full production in January 2008. The colliery closed in June 2015, and the shafts were filled. As a result, the work that was due to begin on a new 900 MW coal-fired power station and industrial estate, Hatfield Power Park, is looking unlikely. The power station would have been linked by a 40-mile (60 km) pipeline to Barmston in the East Riding of Yorkshire, from where CO_{2} would have been released into porous layers beneath an impermeable bed of the North Sea as part of a carbon capture and storage scheme.

The colliery and the surrounding area have been used in a number of television series and films, most notably Dalziel and Pascoe and Brassed Off, and more recently Faith.

== See also ==
- Listed buildings in Stainforth, South Yorkshire
