= Sheffield, Rotherham, Barnsley, Wakefield, Huddersfield and Goole Railway =

Overview
- Status: Operational
- Termini: Horbury; Sheffield
- Website: Official website

Service
- Type: Passenger rail
- System: Standard-gauge railway
- Services: Horbury (Wakefield) to Barnsley section; Barnsley to Sheffield

History
- Opened: 1846
- Closed: 1858

Technical
- Line length: 26 miles (as 1846)
- Track length: 26 miles (as 1846)

The Sheffield, Rotherham, Barnsley, Wakefield, Huddersfield and Goole Railway was an early British railway company. The company obtained an act in 1846 for 26 miles of railway, with a main section from Wakefield to Doncaster via Barnsley.

The section south of Barnsley became the property of the South Yorkshire, Doncaster and Goole Railway Company c. 1851, and the northern section was amalgamated into the Lancashire and Yorkshire Railway c. 1858, after which the original company was dissolved.

== History ==
The Sheffield, Rotherham, Barnsley, Wakefield, Huddersfield, and Goole Railway (SRBWH&GR) applied to Parliament in the 1845/6 session for a railway line. The main line was to begin from junctions with the Sheffield and Rotherham Railway near Brightside and Kimberworth roughly halfway between Sheffield and Rotherham, past Ecclesfield and Tankersley to Barnsley, then past Darton to a junction with the Manchester and Leeds Railway east of Horbury. There were also proposed several branches and deviations of the main line, with junctions to several already established railways, including the Sheffield, Ashton-under-Lyne and Manchester Railway near Brightside; the Huddersfield and Sheffield Junction Railway near Penistone; two junctions to the North Midland Railway near Cudworth and Carlton; and the Wakefield, Pontefract and Goole Railway near Featherstone. The purpose of the railway was to serve the populous regions of West Yorkshire, and to transport minerals (coal) extracted in the Barnsley, Silkstone, and Chapeltown regions.

The bill was originally supported by the Manchester and Leeds Railway (M&LR), who were to provide half the capital for the line, as well as work the railway for 40% of net profit; during the passage of the bill through Parliament agreement was reached that a rival company, the South Yorkshire Coal Railway and Canal Company would take control of the line south of Barnsley, and the LYR the portion north, with each company having running powers over the Silkstone and Dodworth branches. The split in capital apportioned to the construction of the line was £450,000 for the northern part and £350,000 for the southern part. The M&LR withdrew from the capital subscription arrangements and instead agreed to take a lease on the line.

Sheffield, Rotherham, Barnsley, Wakefield, Huddersfield, and Goole Railway Act 1846
- Act of Parliament
- Parliament of the United Kingdom
- Long title: An Act for making certain lines of Railway in the West Riding of the County of York, to be called "The Sheffield, Rotherham, Bamsley, Wakefield, Huddersfield, and Goole Railway."
- Citation: 9 & 10 Vict. c. cccliv

Dates
- Royal assent: 7 August 1846

The company obtained the Sheffield, Rotherham, Barnsley, Wakefield, Huddersfield, and Goole Railway Act 1846 (9 & 10 Vict. c. cccliv) on 7 August 1846, (Note: Sheffield, Rotherham, Barnsley, Wakefield, Huddersfield, and Goole Railway Act 1846 (9 & 10 Vict. c. 354); An Act for making certain Lines of Railway in the West Riding of York, to be called "The Sheffield, Rotherham, Barnsley, Wakefield, Huddersfield, and Goole Railway.") allowing a share capital of £800,000 and permitting raising money by loans of up to £266,000, with railway of 27 miles (43 km) authorised, of lines of total length 50 miles (80 km) submitted.

=== Horbury (Wakefield) to Barnsley section ===
On 9 September 1846 the M&LR company shareholders agreed to lease, and potentially purchase the line, as permitted in the 1846 act.

The M&LR (after 1847 the Lancashire and Yorkshire Railway, L&YR) obtained the line, north of Barnsley (see also Barnsley railway station) running to Horbury Junction southwest of Wakefield. The line was leased at 5% on £260,000 plus receipt of half the calculated net profits.

As built the line was single track, excluding at the junction at the Horbury end, and was 8 miles 62 chains (14.1 km) in length; the line was declared fit for use on 26 December 1849, and was handed to the L&YR on 31 December 1849. The line was doubled by 1855.

Lancashire and Yorkshire and East Lancashire Railway Act 1858
- Act of Parliament
- Parliament of the United Kingdom
- Long title: An Act to make further Provisions for vesting the Sheffield, Rotherham, Barnsley, Wakefield, Huddersfield, and Goole Railway in the Lancashire and Yorkshire Railway Company, and for other Purposes.
- Citation: 21 & 22 Vict. c. cxliii

Dates
- Royal assent: 2 August 1858

The merger of the section of the line leased to the Manchester and Leeds into that company was permitted by the Lancashire and Yorkshire and East Lancashire Railway Act 1858 (21 & 22 Vict. c. cxliii), with the Barnsley company shares converted into £260,050 of L&YR 'Barnsley stock', after which the SRBWG&GR was dissolved.

As part of the L&YR (and under the LMS) the line was known as the 'Barnsley branch', with the junction to L&YR (Manchester & Normanton Line) known as Horbury Junction. Around 1900 a chord was constructed at the northern end ("Horbury and Crigglestone loop"), creating a large triangle junction. Railway works were established at the junction c. 1870 (see Charles Roberts and Co.).

As of 2006, the line is still extant and in use.

=== Barnsley to Sheffield section ===
At a meeting held on 5 October 1846, it was recited that it had now been agreed to lease one portion of the line to the Manchester & Leeds Company and another portion to the South Yorkshire, Doncaster & Goole Railway Company (SYD&GR).

In the parliamentary session of 1846/7 the company sought permission to deviate and abandon parts of the line permitted by the 1846 act of Parliament, as well as allowing the lease or sale of the line south of Barnsley to the South Yorkshire, Doncaster and Goole Railway Company. At the same time the SYD&GR was seeking an act of Parliament to allow its incorporation, acquire the SRBWH&GR, make new lines, and acquire the River Dun Navigation and Dearne and Dove Canal. The act of Parliament enabling the takeover or lease of the railway was passed as the South Yorkshire, Doncaster and Goole Railway Act 1847 (10 & 11 Vict. c. ccxci), creating the named company with capital of £750,000 and power to raise money through loans up to £250,000. (Note: South Yorkshire, Doncaster and Goole Railway Act 1847 (10 & 11 Vict. c. 291); An Act for making several Lines of Railway between Penistone, Barnsley, Elsecar, and Doncaster, in the West Riding of Yorkshire, to be called "The South Yorkshire, Doncaster, and Goole Railway;" and for authorizing the Purchase of Part of the Sheffield, Rotherham, Barnsley, Wakefield, Huddersfield, and Goole Railway, and of the Dun Navigation and Dearne and Dove Canal.)

Sheffield, Rotherham, Barnsley, Wakefield, Huddersfield and Goole Railway Deviation and Amendment Act 1851
- Act of Parliament
- Parliament of the United Kingdom
- Long title: An Act to authorise Deviations of the Sheffield, Rotherham, Barnsley, Wakefield, Huddersfield, and Goole Railway between Sheffield and Barnsley; and to amend the Acts relating to the said Railway.
- Citation: 14 & 15 Vict. c. xlvi

Dates
- Royal assent: 3 July 1851

Text of statute as originally enacted

In 1850, the company applied to make a deviation of, and abandon part of the original main line of 1846 between Ecclesfield and Silkstone, passed as the Sheffield, Rotherham, Barnsley, Wakefield, Huddersfield and Goole Railway Deviation and Amendment Act 1851 (14 & 15 Vict. c. xlvi). (Note: Sheffield, Rotherham, Barnsley, Wakefield, Huddersfield and Goole Railway Deviation and Amendment Act 1851 (14 & 15 Vict. c. 46); An Act to authorize Deviations of the Sheffield, Rotherham, Barnsley, Wakefield, Huddersfield, and Goole Railway between Sheffield and Barnsley; and to amend the Acts relating to the said Railway.)
