= Moor End goods station =

Railway station in South Yorkshire, England

Coordinates: 53.5311°N 1.5522°W

Moor End goods station was in South Yorkshire, England. It was originally the terminus of the Worsborough branch line which ran from the main line of the South Yorkshire Railway at Wombwell. The lower part of the line to Worsborough was opened in June 1850, reaching Moor End two years later, in March 1852. An inclined plane connected the nearby House Carr Colliery with Silkstone Common. By the end of the 19th century this had been replaced by an ordinary railway line, continuing the Worsborough branch to West Silkstone Junction.

Like many other lines in South Yorkshire the main reason for this line was the transportation of coal, and several collieries were situated along the line. Some opened before the line was built, some were constructed afterwards. Around the lower part of the line and opened prior to 1864 was Bell Ing, Edmund's Main and Martin's Main collieries at Worsborough. Further along the line were collieries at Silkstone Common, including the ill-fated Huskar Pit, where 26 children died in a disaster in 1838.

Later, in 1880, after the South Yorkshire Railway had joined with the Manchester, Sheffield and Lincolnshire Railway, the line was extended, not from its terminus but from a junction a short distance before it was reached, Moor End goods then being on a short spur. The line then reached West Silkstone Junction on the Barnsley to Penistone line. By the end of the 19th century the station had disappeared, while a siding south of the branch line served Old Sovereign Colliery.

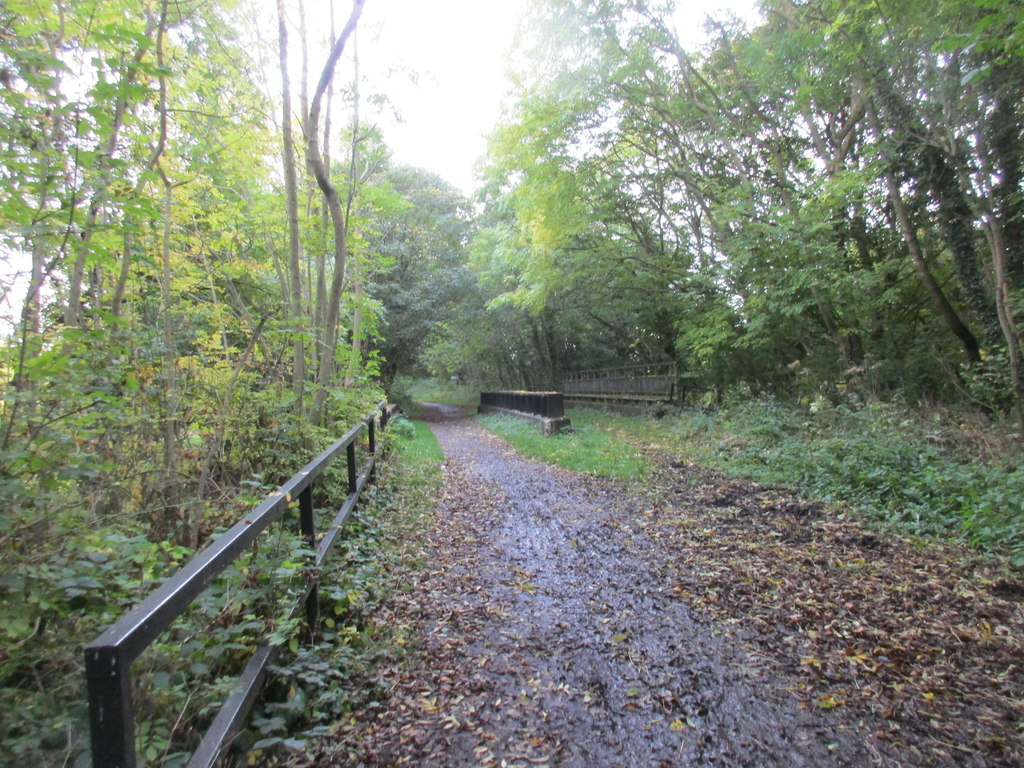
Looking down the Worsborough Bank from Moor End railway bridge

The section of the Worsborough branch line between West Silkstone Junction and Worsborough of some 7 miles (11 km) of incline with around 3 miles (4.8 km) at a gradient of 1 in 40 became known as the infamous "Worsborough Bank" and was the reason for the London and North Eastern Railway to build their only Garratt locomotive of class U1.
