= Hull and Doncaster Branch =

Railway line in England

Overview
- Other name: Staddlethorpe Junction to Thorne Junction

History
- Opened: 1869

Technical
- Track length: 14.5 miles (23.3 km)
- Track gauge: 4 ft 8 1/2 in (1,435 mm)

The Hull and Doncaster Branch is a secondary main railway line in England, connecting Kingston upon Hull to South Yorkshire and beyond via a branch from the Selby Line near Gilberdyke to a connection to the Doncaster–Barnetby line at a junction near Thorne 8 miles north-east of Doncaster.

The line was sanctioned by parliament in 1864, and opened in 1869; much of the line is flat, with extensive straight sections; the crossing of the River Ouse required a major bridge, the Skelton Viaduct (or Goole swing bridge). There are two minor stations on the line Saltmarshe and Thorne North; the present Goole railway station was also created as part of the line, replacing an earlier terminus in the docks.

== Description ==
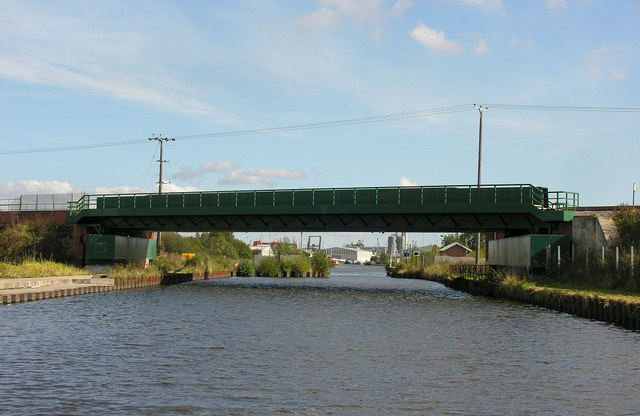
Modern bridge on the Goole Knottingley canal (2007)

The Hull and Doncaster Line is a railway running from Staddlethorpe junction (also known as Giberdyke junction) on the Hull and Selby Line south-west past to the River Ouse crossing by the Skelton Viaduct swing bridge near Skelton and then making an end on junction at Goole railway station.

At Goole the line diverges south-west passing over the westward running line of the former Wakefield, Pontefract and Goole Railway (WP&GR); Knottingley and Goole Canal (Aire and Calder); and the Dutch River, then passing Thorne and crossing the Stainforth and Keadby Canal section of the Sheffield and South Yorkshire Navigation, connecting with the Barnsley to Barnetby Line at Thorne junction. The line then ran to Doncaster over the Barnsley to Barnetby branch line to Doncaster.

As of 2014 Network Rail classes the line as a secondary route, part of the SRS H.08 set of route which include Goole-Knottingley and Moorthorpe-Knottingley-Church Fenton lines. The line is double tracked, with the exception of the junction at Thorne. The line code is TJG: TJG1 Thorne junction to Thorne is 1 mile 944 yards (2.473 km); and TJG2, Gilberdyke junction to Thorne North, 14 miles (23 km). Route availability is 8 or 9, with loading gauge W6 to W9, the linespeed mostly 70 miles per hour (110 km/h).

The line is used for both passenger and freight trains, with an average of two passenger trains per hour.

== History ==
=== Background ===
Early proposals for a line connecting Hull to Doncaster included the Hull, Sheffield and Midland Direct Railway, promoted in 1845, which was for a line from the Hull and Selby Line near Gilberdyke, crossing the Ouse near Goole by a tunnel, then via Thorne and Kirk Sandall to Doncaster, then west to a junction with the North Midland Railway (Midland Railway) near Wath upon Dearne. This was abandoned by 1846. Another scheme, the Hull, Goole and Doncaster Railway was promoted in 1855 to connect South Yorkshire coalfields to Hull.

In 1860 another scheme, called the 'Hull and Doncaster Railway', was submitted to Parliament. The line was to run from the Thorne branch of the South Yorkshire Railway (SYR) to a junction with the Hull and Selby Railway east of Staddlethorpe station. Both the SYR and Great Northern Railway (GNR) were to have running powers to Hull over the line. The North Eastern Railway (NER) persuaded the original promoters to withdraw the scheme on the understanding that the NER would promote and build a similar line.

The NER submitted a scheme for a railway connecting Doncaster (South Yorkshire) and Hull via a line from Staddlethorpe to Hull; the NER's line face three other rival schemes: the independently promoted Hull and West Riding Junction Railway; and lines from south Yorkshire towards Hull promoted by the Lancashire and Yorkshire Railway (L&YR), and by the SYR, the 'Hull and West Riding Junction' scheme was withdrawn at an early stage, the remaining three schemes undertook and expensive three-way battle in Parliament for an enabling act. The NER's scheme was passed by the House of Commons but defeated in the House of Lords.

In the next session of Parliament (1862/3) the NER reached an agreement with the SYR and Manchester, Sheffield and Lincolnshire Railways (MSLR, then lessor of the SYR from 1861) not to oppose the bill, in exchange for mutual running powers over the two companies' lines between Hull and Doncaster. The NER also reached an agreement with the L&YR, who had a rival bill in Parliament, with both companies agreeing running powers on each other's routes to Normanton, and mutual running powers to Hull, and to Barnsley. The NER's scheme was submitted in 1862, and in the same session the SYR submitted a bill with clauses enabling it to modify a previously permitted line from Doncaster to Thorne (the South Yorkshire Railway (Sheffield and Thorne) Act 1862 (25 & 26 Vict. c. 141) (Note: South Yorkshire Railway (Sheffield and Thorne) Act 1862 (25 & 26 Vict. c. 141); An Act to enable the South Yorkshire Railway and River Dun Company to make Railways near Sheffield and Thorne, and to exercise other Powers.: The act added a straightened deviation of the SYR's earlier canalside line. See: South Yorkshire Railway. (Railways near Sheffield and Thorne; Powers over Manchester, Sheffield, and Lincolnshire Railway; Closing Road at Hexthorpe.), 26 November 1861, pp. 4921–)) to add a junction and branch north to near the Selby-Bawtry turnpike, north-west of the town of Thorne.

North Eastern Railway (Hull and Doncaster Branch) Act 1863
- Act of Parliament
- Parliament of the United Kingdom
- Long title: An Act to enable the North-eastern Railway Company to construct a Railway from the Hull and Selby Railway at Staddlethorpe to the authorised Line of the South Yorkshire Railway near Thorne, with Two Branches therefrom, to raise additional Capital; and for other Purposes.
- Citation: 26 & 27 Vict. c. ccxxxviii
- Territorial extent: United Kingdom

Dates
- Royal assent: 28 July 1863
Other legislation
Amends	Aire and Calder Navigation Act 1828

Text of statute as originally enacted

The NER's act was enabled by Parliament on 28 July 1863, as the North Eastern Railway (Hull and Doncaster Branch) Act 1863 (26 & 27 Vict. c. ccxxxviii); (Note: North Eastern Railway (Hull and Doncaster Branch) Act 1863 (26 & 27 Vict. c. ccxxxviii); An Act to enable the North-eastern Railway Company to construct a Railway from the Hull and Selby Railway at Staddlethorpe to the authorised Line of the South Yorkshire Railway near Thorne, with Two Branches therefrom, to raise additional Capital; and for other Purposes.) and the SYR's deviations and branch were incorporated into the South Yorkshire Railway Act 1863 (26 & 27 Vict. c. 146), (Note: South Yorkshire Railway Act 1863 (26 & 27 Vict. c. 146); An Act to enable the South Yorkshire Railway and River Dun Company to alter their authorized Line; to purchase the Barnsley Coal Railway; and for other Purposes relating to the same Company.) both passed in the same session.

=== Construction ===
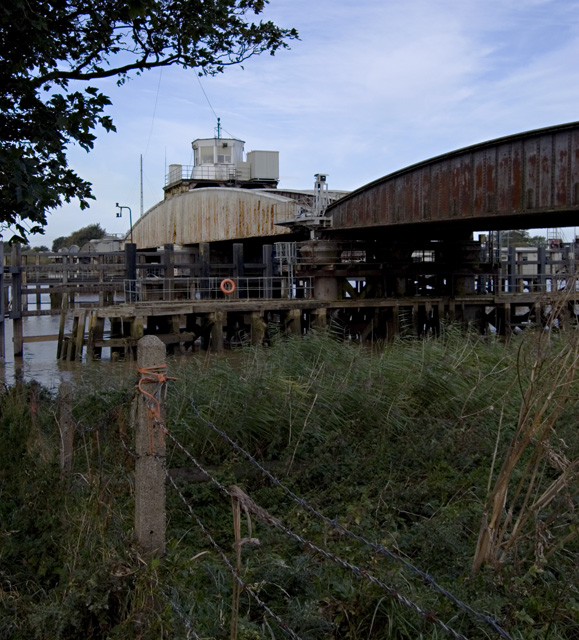
Skelton Viaduct or Goole swing bridge (2009)

The line was to run from the NER's Hull and Selby Line west of Staddlethorpe station at Staddlethorpe junction; (Note: 53.74846°N 0.73511°W, Staddlethorpe junction) to a connection with the SYR southwest of Thorne, joining the main line at Thorne junction; (Note: 53.60120°N 0.99062°W, Thorpe junction) with a chord making a connection to the WP&GR's (L&YR) existing railway at Goole from Potter's Grange junction. (Note: 53.70092°N 0.88390°W, Potter's Grange junction) The act allowed £310,000 in shares, and £103,000 in loans to be raised specifically for the construction of the line.

Most of the route of the line was relatively flat ground, representing an easy route for construction of a railway. The main feature of the line was the wrought iron bridge crossing the River Ouse, the Skelton Viaduct; (Note: 53.71318°N 0.84166°W, Skelton Viaduct (Goole swing bridge)) at the time of construction it was amongst the largest opening bridges in the world, with a 250 feet (76 m) swing span, and total length including fixed spans of 830 feet (250 m). The contractors for the bridge were Butler and Pitts of Stanningley (fixed spans), and Pease, Hutchingson and Company (Skerne Ironworks) for the swing span, with hydraulic machinery from William Armstrong (Newcastle upon Tyne).

Bridges were also required in close succession west of Goole: one over the L&YR line into the docks 80 feet (24 m); (Note: 53.69440°N 0.89347°W, Bridge over Goole docks line) the Knottingley and Goole Canal, crossed by an iron trellis girder of around 128 feet (39 m); (Note: 53.69388°N 0.89380°W, Knottingley and Goole canal bridge) and the Dutch River, with two iron trellis girders of 90 feet (27 m). (Note: 53.69236°N 0.89445°W, Dutch River bridge) (Note: The Dutch River and canal bridges were supported on iron columns, similar to that used on the Skelton Viaduct.) On the southern part of the line, west of Thorne, bridges were required over the Stainforth and Keadby canal, (Note: 53.61203°N 0.97667°W, Stainforth and Keadby canal bridge) and the Thorne-Selby road. (Note: 53.61559°N 0.97302°W, Selby turnpike (A614) bridge) Stations were built at Laxton (Saltmarshe station), (Note: 53.72188°N 0.80963°W, Saltmarshe station) a new through station at Goole, (Note: 53.70497°N 0.87430°W, Goole station) and a second station at Thorne (Thorne North station). (Note: 53.61619°N 0.97242°W, Thorne North station)

Construction of the Hull-Thorne section, and straightening of the Doncaster-Thorne Line had begun by 1864; work on the SYR's line was continued through 1865, with the line (Sandall to Maude's Bridge) opened 10 November 1866. Work on the Thorne-Doncaster section continued through 1866 and 1867, with the line nearly completed in 1868 and the Skelton Viaduct over the Ouse complete enough by February 1868 to allow officials of the NER to pass over it in a train.

The length of new line was 14.5 miles (23.3 km), (Note: Sheardown (1869, p. 71) gives a figure of 18 miles between Staddlethorpe and Thorne, seemingly erroneously.) Brassey and Field were the main contractors for the line, represented by J. Stevenson; the main engineer was the NER's T. E. Harrison, with John Malt the resident engineer; Buttler and Pitt were contractors for the fixed bridges.

=== 1869–present ===
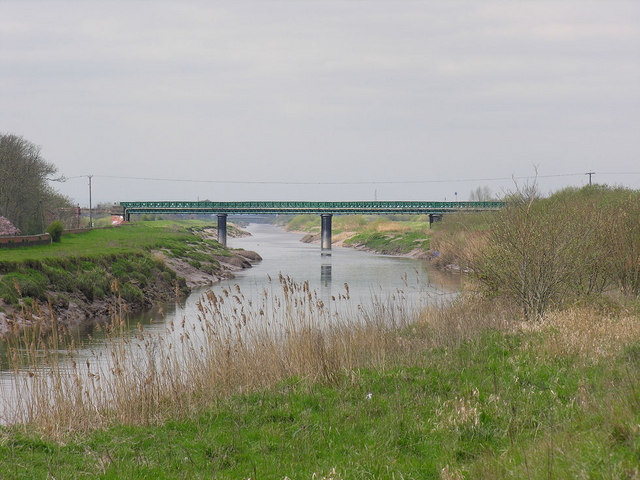
(original) Bridge over the Dutch River (2007)

The line opened 30 July 1869. (Note: Sheardown (1869, p. 70) gives a date of 2 August.) The line replaced the former route into Hull from the south along the Normanton-York branch (former York and North Midland Railway) via Milford junction onto the Leeds and Selby Line. The original L&YR station in Goole became defunct with trains diverted into the new station.

The line was the main route for south Yorkshire coal to Hull, together with the Hull and Barnsley Railway (after 1885).

The Goole and Marshland Light Railway, later Axholme Joint Railway was established in 1898, with a junction at Marshland junction. (Note: 53.67684°N 0.90725°W, Marshland junction) It was bought by the North Eastern Railway for £27,500 on 1 October 1903, while still under construction, and opened on 2 January 1905. The line closed to passengers on 15 July 1933, while freight traffic ceased on 5 April 1965, but the track was not lifted, and was retained as a long siding. The Central Electricity Generating Board paid for its maintenance, as the railway bridge at Crowle was the only one strong enough to allow stators from Keadby Power Station to be taken away for maintenance. This practice continued until Lindsey County Council built a new bridge on the A161 road, crossing the Stainforth and Keadby Canal at Crowle, and the rails were finally lifted in 1972.

By the beginning of the 20th century there were also sidings to peat moss works on Thorne and Hatfield Moors. (Note: 53.64656°N 0.94256°W, Junction for Peat moss works siding (Moorend works)) (Note: 53.66257°N 0.92384°W, Junction for Peat moss works siding (Creyke's siding)) Creyke's Siding was originally a small trailing siding to the west of the line. Its construction was negotiated by Richard Boynton Creyke, and authorised by an agreement dated 7 May 1863. It was close to Moor Road, and there was a signal box to the east of the line at the crossing. The Peat Moss Litter Company built a works to the east of the line in 1886, and agreement was reached for a longer trailing siding to serve the works, on the opposite side of the main line to the original siding. The agreement was dated 11 February 1887. The siding agreement was assigned to William Smith & Co on 9 February 1894, who had taken over the works in 1889. The works was served by a network of 3 ft (914 mm) gauge horsedrawn tramways, extending onto the moors. Smiths also built a firelighter and disinfectant works near the northern end of the siding. Both products were peat based. The British Moss Litter Co Ltd took over the site in 1896, but failed to notify the North Eastern Railway, who noted the change in 1909. Lengthy correspondence followed, resulting in a new siding agreement being reached on 21 January 1910. The railway company also recorded that the siding was used by a farmer called Mr G Dougherty and by the Nego Firelighting Company in 1908. The peat works operated until 1950–51, and was largely demolished in 1970–71.

Moorend Works was situated a little further to the south. The works were established in the 1860s, although its exact purpose at the time is unclear, but Newman & Owston Moss Litter Co Ltd took over the site in 1888. They negotiated a short branch line with a passing loop, in an agreement dated 24 April 1889. It ran eastwards from the main line, sweeping round to the south as it entered the works. The peat company merged with the Griendtsveen Moss Litter Co Ltd on 11 May 1893, and the siding agreement was assigned to them on 15 February 1894. In addition to 3 ft (914 mm) gauge tramways, they built around 14 miles (23 km) of canals on the moors to serve the works. The British Moss Litter Co also took over this works, in 1896, and the siding agreement was assigned to them on 14 October 1898. The works were destroyed by a fire in 1922, after which no further peat was processed there, although the remaining buildings were used as a maintenance workshop until 1956. The standard gauge siding was not lifted immediately after production ceased, as it was still in evidence in the mid-1930s, and appears on the 1948 Ordnance Survey map, although not on the 1956 edition.

In 1910 a new route of the L&YR (Pontefract-Goole Line) into Goole was opened, avoiding the former path into the docks, joining the line just east of the original junction; also in 1910 the Goole and Selby Line began running into Goole station via the new L&YR line onto the Hull-Doncaster branch. In 1909 the NER also obtained an act to widen a short section of the line on the approach to Staddlethorpe junction.

Thorne Colliery (opened 1924, closed 1958) was connected to the railway line by sidings. (Note: 53.64489°N 0.94445°W, Junction for Thorne Colliery sidings)

The Skelton Viaduct has been struck by boats on multiple occasions. Damage was sufficient to cause the temporary closure of the line in 1973 and 1988.

== See also ==
- Hatfield Colliery landslip, colliery landslip which blocked the route south of Thorne in 2013
