= Keadby railway station =

Former railway station in Lincolnshire, England

Keadby

General information
- Location: Keadby, North Lincolnshire; England
- Coordinates: 53.5929°N 0.7423°W
- Grid reference: SE834114

Other information
- Status: Disused

History
- Original company: South Yorkshire Railway
- Pre-grouping: Manchester, Sheffield and Lincolnshire Railway

Key dates
- 10 September 1859: Opened as Keadby
- 1 October 1866: Renamed Keadby for Amcotts and Burringham
- 2 November 1874: Closed
Location

The original Keadby railway station was the easternmost terminus of the South Yorkshire Railway. The railway, which was extended from Thorne and opened in September 1859 was built without an Act of Parliament, as the railway company owned the canal alongside which they built the line.

The station and other railway associated facilities were situated on the west bank of the River Trent to the north of the point where the Stainforth and Keadby Canal passed through a lock to access the river.

On 1 May 1866, the first Keadby Bridge and the associated diversionary route were brought into use for goods trains; passenger trains started using the new route on 1 October. On that date, Keadby station was renamed Keadby for Amcotts and Burringham.

The station closed on 2 November 1874. Although the goods and locomotive facilities remained, the locomotive facilities, until the opening of a new shed at Frodingham, were replaced when the line was diverted to cross the Trent by a swing bridge situated some 150 yards upstream. This bridge, itself, was replaced in 1914 with a new lifting bridge, which although now fixed, is still in use today. The present day station was originally known as Keadby and Althorpe but this has been shortened to Althorpe.

Preceding station	Disused railways	Following station
Crowle; Line closed, station open	South Yorkshire Railway; Doncaster to Keadby line	Terminus
