= Medge Hall Halt railway station =

Former railway station in Lincolnshire, England

Coordinates: 53.60177°N 0.87282°W

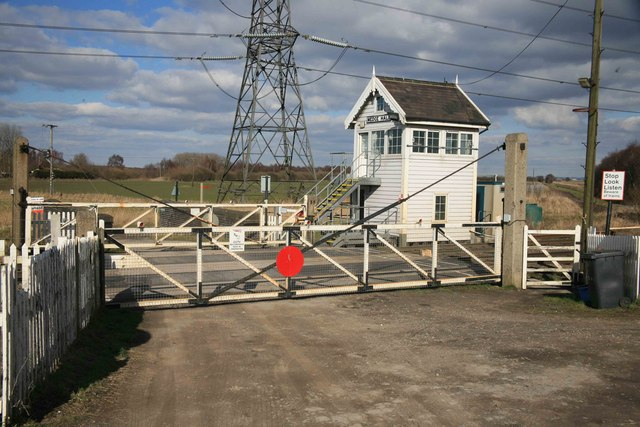
site of railway station

Medge Hall Halt was a small railway station in Lincolnshire, on the Doncaster to Cleethorpes Line, close to the border with Yorkshire. It served the local Medge Hall. The station was opened by the South Yorkshire Railway in September 1859. It closed in 1960, though the line it stood on is still open.

Preceding station	Historical railways	Following station
Maud's Bridge; Line open, station closed	South Yorkshire Railway; Doncaster to Keadby line	Godnow Bridge; Line open, station closed
