= Kirk Bramwith =

Village and civil parish in South Yorkshire, England

Coordinates: 53.6°N 1.067°W

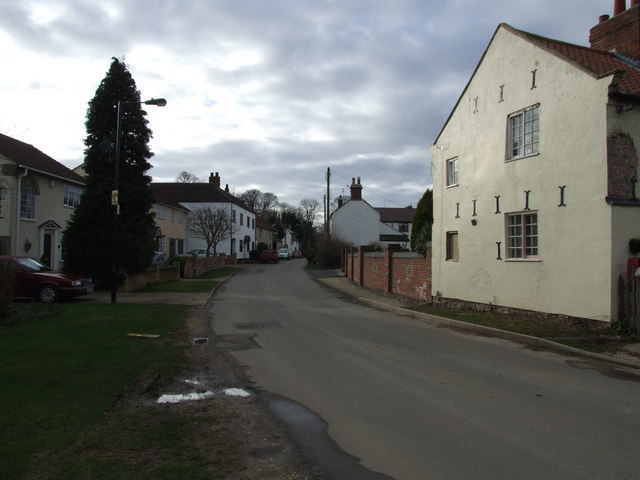
- Village street in Kirk Bramwith

- Location within South Yorkshire
- Population: 320 (2011 Census)
- Civil parish: Kirk Bramwith
- Metropolitan borough: Doncaster
- Metropolitan county: South Yorkshire
- Region: Yorkshire and the Humber
- Country: England
- Sovereign state: United Kingdom
- Post town: DONCASTER
- Postcode district: DN7
- Dialling code: 01302
- Police: South Yorkshire
- Fire: South Yorkshire
- Ambulance: Yorkshire

Kirk Bramwith is a village and civil parish in the Metropolitan Borough of Doncaster in South Yorkshire, England. It had a population of 200 in 2001, increasing to 320 at the 2011 Census. The village centre is located on a narrow strip of land, sandwiched between the River Don Navigation to the south east and the New Junction Canal to the north west. It is low-lying, with most of it close to the 16-foot (5 m) contour, and is almost surrounded by drainage ditches.

The name Bramwith derives from the Old English brōmwudu meaning 'broom wood'. Wudu was later replaced by the Old Norse vithr, with the spelling also influenced by the Old English wīc and the Old Norse þveit. 'Kirk' derives from the Old Norse kirkja meaning 'church'.

== Structures ==
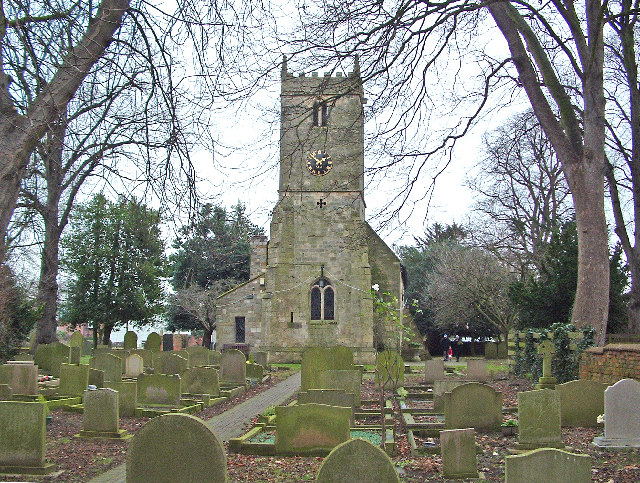
St Mary's church and cemetery

The Anglican church building is dedicated to St. Mary, and is grade II* listed. Most of the structure, which includes a square west tower, is fourteenth or fifteenth century, but the arch into the chancel and the south porch are much earlier, having been built in the twelfth century. It is built of ashlar magnesian limestone, with roofs of stone slate and Welsh slate. The old rectory was built in 1864 in a Tudor Revival style, using red brick with a Welsh slate roof. On Low Lane there is a late eighteenth-century bridge which crosses a drain. It is built of ashlar and rock-faced sandstone and limestone, and once included a sluice on the downstream side to regulate the flow between Bramwith Drain and Kirk Bramwith New Cut.

== See also ==
- Listed buildings in Kirk Bramwith
