= Crowle railway station =

Railway station in Lincolnshire, England

Crowle
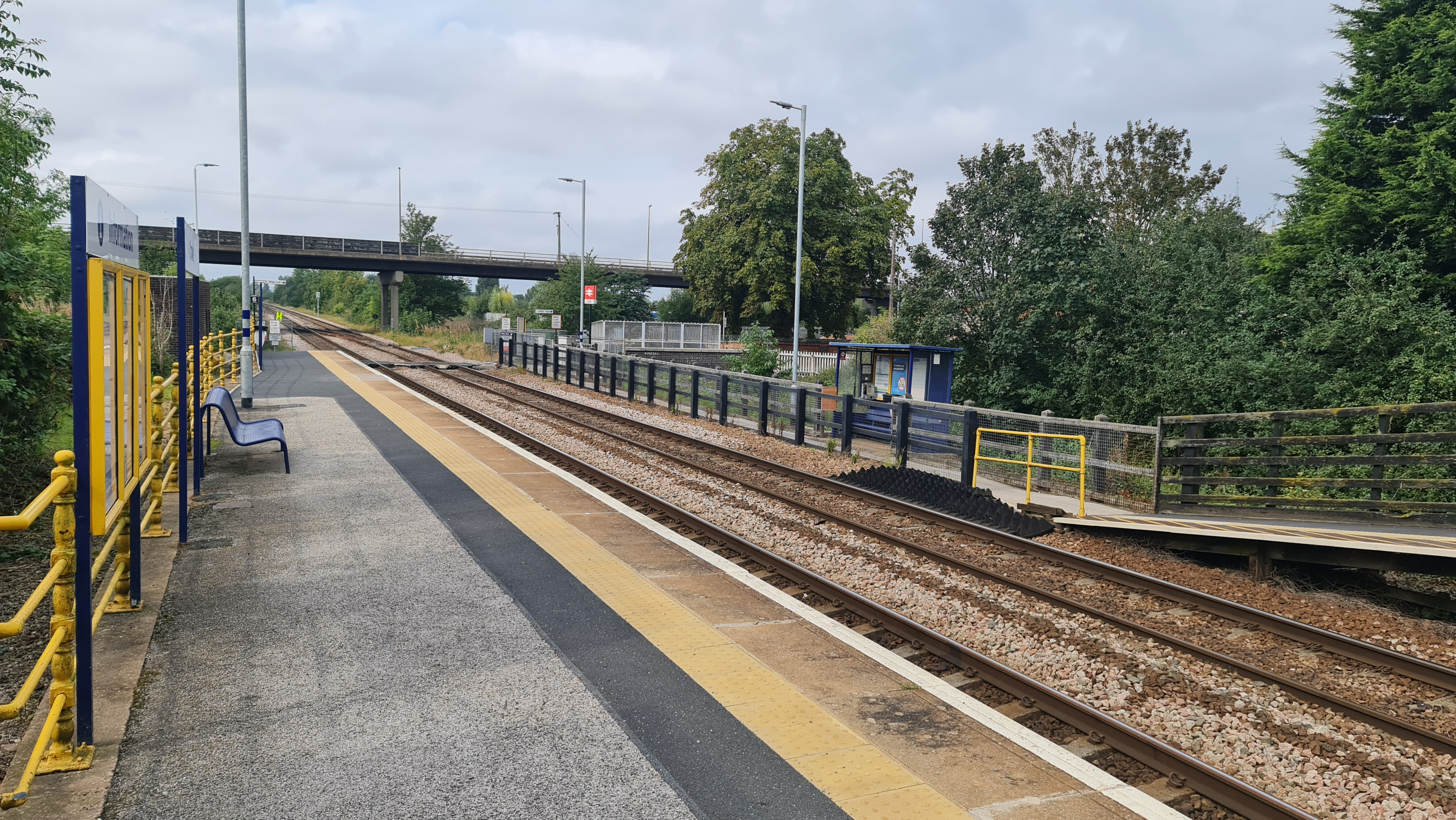
- Crowle railway station in 2023

General information
- Location: Crowle, North Lincolnshire; England
- Coordinates: 53.5898°N 0.8175°W
- Grid reference: SE783110
- Manager: Northern Trains
- Platforms: 2

Other information
- Station code: CWE
- Classification: DfT category F2

History
- Opened: 13 September 1859

Passengers
- 2021/22: ▲13,796
- 2022/23: ▼5,770
- 2023/24: ▲13,758
- 2024/25: ▲14,622
- 2025/26: ▼14,384
Location
Notes
- Passenger statistics from the Office of Rail and Road

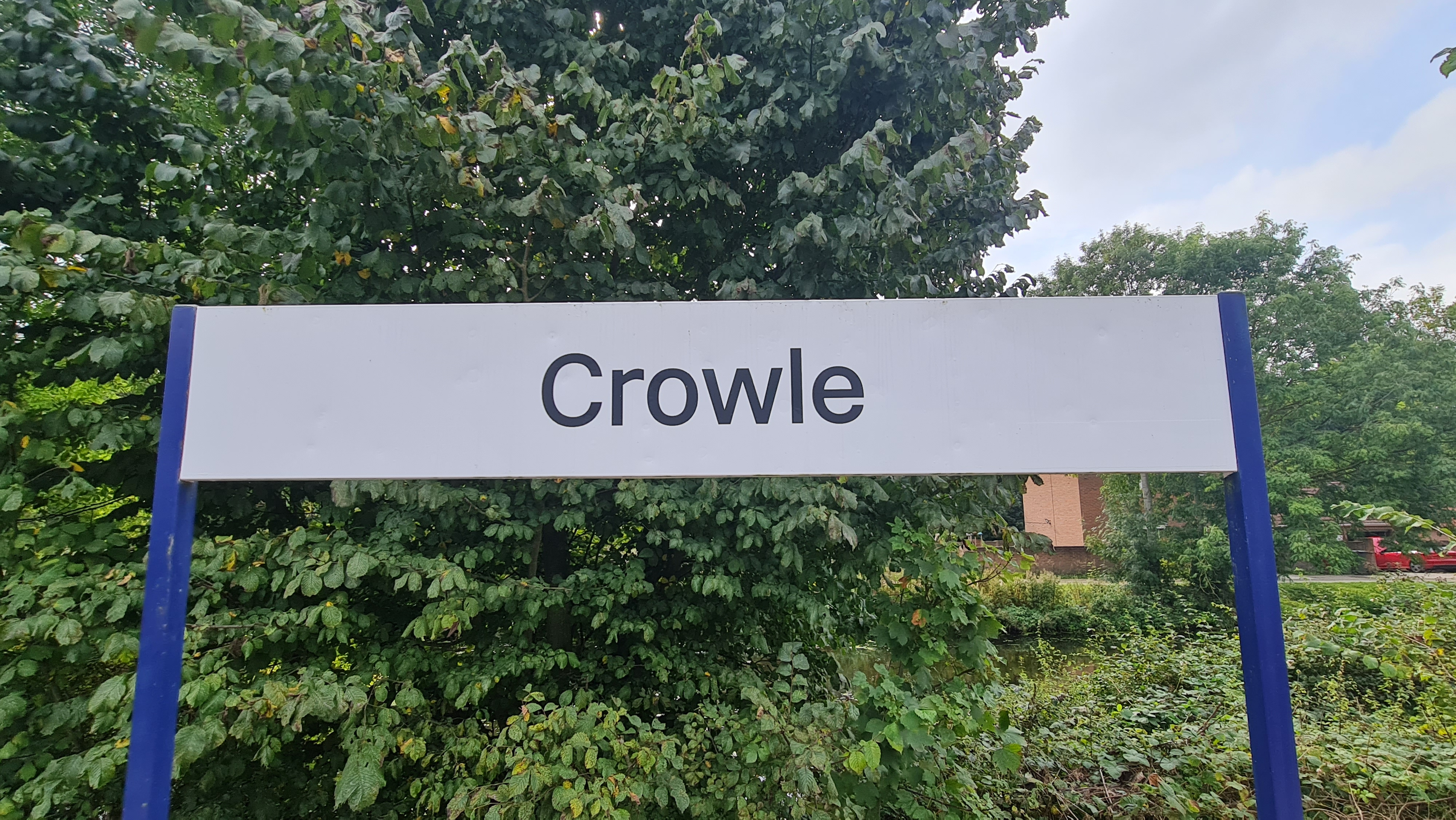
Crowle Railway Station Sign (Rail Alphabet 2)

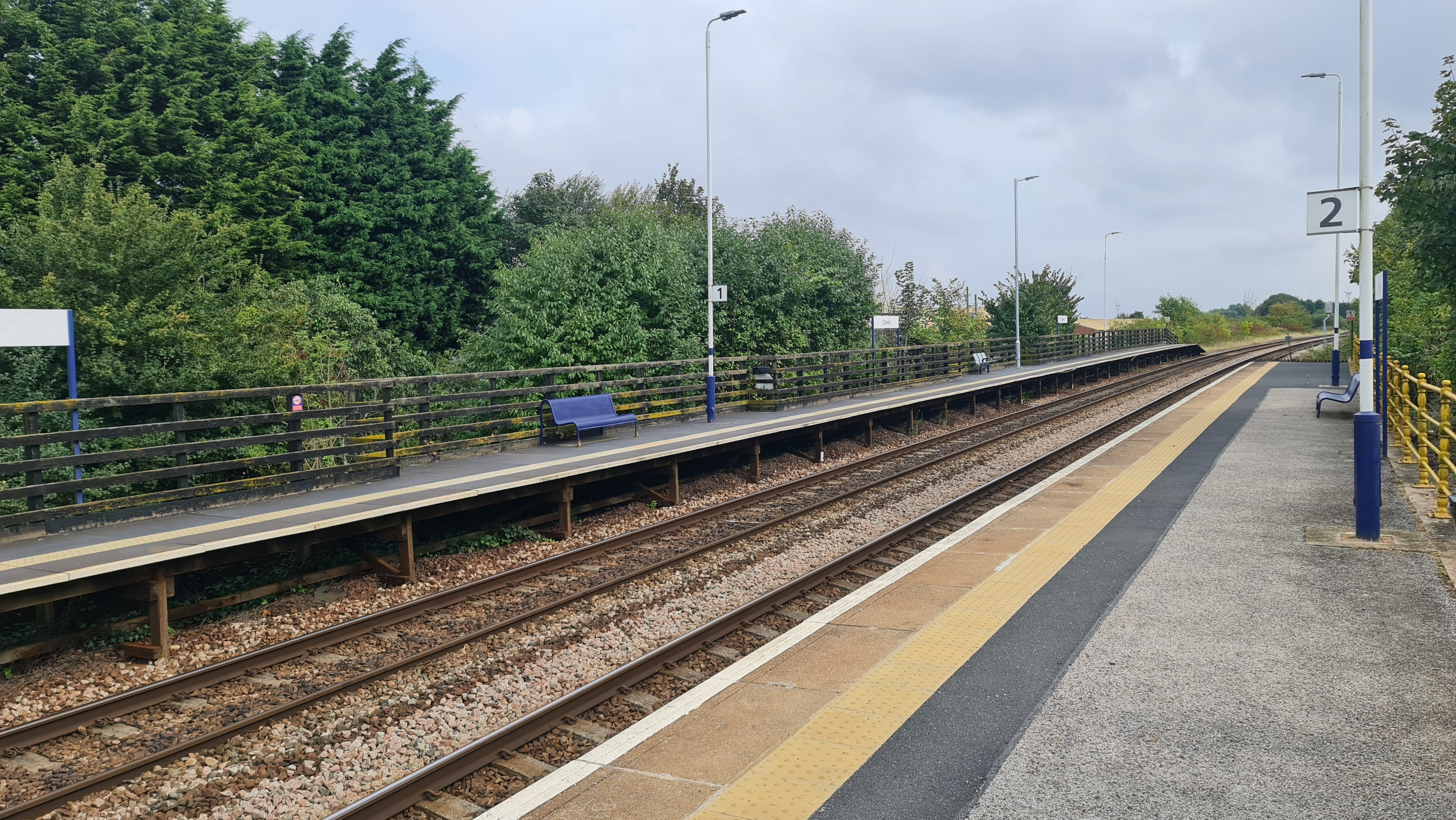
Crowle Railway Station looking East towards Scunthorpe

Crowle railway station serves the market town of Crowle in North Lincolnshire, England. Most services are provided by Northern Trains, who operate the station. Occasional services by TransPennine Express also call at this station.

The station has very limited facilities. There is a shelter on each platform, but no other permanent buildings. A public telephone is provided on platform 1 along with timetable posters to offer train running information. Platform 2 is accessible only by a barrow crossing at the west end of the station, but step-free access is available from the main entrance onto platform 1. The disused signal box has now been knocked down and levelled off.

== Service ==
Before the COVID-19 pandemic, Northern Trains ran an hourly service Monday-Saturday in both directions calling here between Doncaster and Scunthorpe. With no service on a Sunday.

Currently (summer 2025), this has been reduced to every 2 hours, again with no Sunday service. One TransPennine Express service between Cleethorpes and Liverpool Lime Street in each direction also stops here, early morning westbound and late evening eastbound.

In February 2013, the line northeast of Hatfield and Stainforth station towards Thorne was blocked by the Hatfield Colliery landslip, with all services over the section halted. The line reopened in July 2013.

Preceding station	National Rail	Following station
Thorne South	Northern Trains South Humberside Main Line Monday-Saturday only	Althorpe
Thorne South	TransPennine Express South Humberside Main Line Limited Service	Althorpe
	Disused railways	
Godnow Bridge	South Yorkshire Railway; Doncaster to Keadby Line	Keadby
