= South Yorkshire Railway =

Railway in England

The South Yorkshire Railway was a railway company with lines in the West Riding of Yorkshire, England.

Initially promoted as the South Yorkshire Coal Railway in 1845, the railway was enabled by the South Yorkshire, Doncaster and Goole Railway Act 1847 as the South Yorkshire, Doncaster and Goole Railway Company which incorporated into it the permitted line of the Sheffield, Rotherham, Barnsley, Wakefield, Huddersfield and Goole Railway south of Barnsley, the River Dun Navigation, and Dearne and Dove Canals; and had permission for a line from Swinton to Doncaster and other branches. On 10 November 1849 the first section of line opened between Swinton and Doncaster, with the remainder opening in the early 1850s.

In 1850 the company formally amalgamated with its canal interests, forming the South Yorkshire Railway and River Dun Company, in context generally referred to as the "South Yorkshire Railway".

As well as extensive colliery traffic, the company's tracks eventually supported a passenger service between Barnsley and Doncaster; a branch line from Wombwell to Sheffield through the Blackburn valley; and services beyond Doncaster to Thorne and Keadby.

The South Yorkshire Railway was absorbed by the Manchester, Sheffield and Lincolnshire Railway in 1864.

== History ==
=== Background ===
A company, named the "South Yorkshire Coal Railway", set out its plans in a prospectus in 1845. Its proposals were given as being "To connect the South Yorkshire coalfield with the existing and proposed main lines of railway, in connection with the canals and navigation of that district": Nothing further than to move coal from the area where it was mined to its major markets. These met with opposition in Parliament, principally from the North Midland Railway and the, still at proposal stage line of the Manchester, Midland and Great Grimsby Junction Railway which saw the South Yorkshire proposals as a rival to its own intentions. The opposition won the day and the South Yorkshire Coal Railway Bill was defeated.

The North Midland Railway completed its line between Leeds and Derby passing through Swinton, its nearest point to Doncaster. This led to pressure for a line to be built connecting the North Midland to Doncaster.

=== South Yorkshire, Doncaster and Goole Railway (1847–1850) ===
A bill was introduced to Parliament for a South Yorkshire Coal Railway in 1846. but failed to win the required powers but was re-introduced later, in a shorter version.

South Yorkshire, Doncaster and Goole Railway Act 1847
- Act of Parliament
- Parliament of the United Kingdom
- Long title: An Act for making several Lines of Railway between Penistone, Barnsley, Elsecar, and Doncaster, in the West Riding of Yorkshire, to be called "The South Yorkshire, Doncaster, and Goole Railway;" and for authorizing the Purchase of Part of the Sheffield, Rotherham, Barnsley, Wakefield, Huddersfield, and Goole Railway, and of the Dun Navigation and Dearne and Dove Canal.
- Citation: 10 & 11 Vict. c. ccxci
- Territorial extent: United Kingdom

Dates
- Royal assent: 22 July 1847

Other legislation
- Amends: River Dun Navigation Act 1726; River Dun Navigation Act 1732
- Relates to: Barnsley Canal Act 1808

Text of statute as originally enacted

In the 1846/7 session of Parliament the South Yorkshire, Doncaster and Goole Railway Company (SYD&GR) was established 22 July by the South Yorkshire, Doncaster and Goole Railway Act 1847 (10 & 11 Vict. c. ccxci) enabling it to acquire the permitted lines of Sheffield, Rotherham, Barnsley, Wakefield, Huddersfield and Goole Railway (SRBWH&GR) south of Barnsley, make new lines, and acquire the River Dun Navigation and Dearne and Dove Canal. The company's permitted lines were a main line from Doncaster to a junction with the Midland Railway at Swinton plus several branches. Powers for a branch from Mexborough to Rotherham were refused, due to opposition from the Midland, a branch from Worsborough to Penistone was also declined. The company's allowed share issue was £750,000 in £20 shares.

South Yorkshire, Doncaster, and Goole Railway Act 1848
- Act of Parliament
- Parliament of the United Kingdom
- Long title: An Act to authorize the South Yorkshire, Doncaster, and Goole Railway Company to construct a Branch Railway to the Great Northern Railway at Doncaster.
- Citation: 11 & 12 Vict. c. lxv
- Territorial extent: United Kingdom

Dates
- Royal assent: 22 July 1848

Text of statute as originally enacted

South Yorkshire, Doncaster and Goole Railway (Deviation and Extension of Elsecar Branch) Act 1850
- Act of Parliament
- Parliament of the United Kingdom
- Long title: An Act to authorize Deviations in the Line of the South Yorkshire, Doncaster, and Goole Railway, the Extension of the Elsecar Branch of the said Railway to Tankersley, and the Amendment of the Acts relating to the said Railway.
- Citation: 13 & 14 Vict. c. xxxv
- Territorial extent: United Kingdom

Dates
- Royal assent: 15 July 1850

Text of statute as originally enacted

South Yorkshire Railway and River Dun Company Act 1850
- Act of Parliament
- Parliament of the United Kingdom
- Long title: An Act to authorize the abandoning of certain Portions of the South Yorkshire, Doncaster, and Goole Railway, a Deviation thereof near Doncaster, and the Amendment of the Acts relating thereto.
- Citation: 13 & 14 Vict. c. lvii
- Territorial extent: United Kingdom

Dates
- Royal assent: 15 July 1850

Other legislation
- Amends: River Dun Navigation Act 1726; River Dun Navigation Act 1732
- Relates to: Barnsley Canal Act 1793

Text of statute as originally enacted

The company applied for modifications and extensions to, and abandonments of some of its lines in the 1847/8 and 1849/50 parliamentary sessions, resulting in three further acts, the South Yorkshire, Doncaster, and Goole Railway Act 1848 (11 & 12 Vict. c. lxv), the South Yorkshire, Doncaster and Goole Railway (Deviation and Extension of Elsecar Branch) Act 1850 (13 & 14 Vict. c. xxxv) and the South Yorkshire Railway and River Dun Company Act 1850 (13 & 14 Vict. c. lvii); two bills were submitted in 1849 so that the one making a deviation at Doncaster, which was not likely to be opposed was not jeopardised by the other.

Formal amalgamation with the Dun and Dearne canals took place 12 April 1850. After amalgamation the company became the South Yorkshire Railway and River Dun Company. In reference to its railway activities it was usually referred to as the South Yorkshire Railway.

==== Swinton to Doncaster ====
Work on the main line was under way by October 1847, the first, ceremonial sod being cut in "Warmsworth Field", the site of the present day cutting. Work ran overtime but the line was ready for a trial run to take place on 29 October 1849 when a special train left Doncaster, Cherry Tree Lane station located on the triangle junction with the Great Northern Railway (GNR), southwest of Doncaster. The train, made up of two first class carriages loaned by the Midland Railway and a GNR open wagon fitted with seats, was propelled by a four-coupled tank locomotive which had been used for ballasting the line.

The Board of Trade inspector, Captain George Wynne, inspected the Doncaster-Swinton section of the line on 31 October 1849 and reported it as safe for use, also noting some deviations from the permitted line.

The date of opening was set for Saturday, 3 November, however delays put this back by a week, and the Swinton to Doncaster line was opened 16 November 1850. The passenger service, to run from Sheffield, was to be operated by the Midland Railway and was timed to connect with their trains from the North, Derby, Birmingham, Gloucester, Bristol and London. At the opening the only intermediate station on the SYD&GR. was Conisbrough although further stations were added from 1 February 1850 to serve the villages of Mexborough and Sprotborough. The Midland company worked the line with its engines and carriages in exchange for one quarter of the receipts.

==== Swinton to Barnsley ====
The Elsecar branch was opened for mineral traffic on 1 March 1850. The branch connected to the main line to Barnsley at Elsecar junction, and served Earl Fitzwilliam's colliery in Elsecar. The coal was passed to the GNR for shipment to Boston Docks. It was always the intention of the company to convey the coal over its own metals for onward shipment and a line was projected to run east of Doncaster for this purpose.

The main line northwards towards Barnsley had reached Oldham Bridge (later known as Aldham) by 1850, and a branch west to Worsborough was opened in 1850. The main line continued northwest (via Aldham junction) to Barnsley, forming and end on junction at the south end of Barnsley Exchange station. The line opened on 1 July 1851 and a passenger service from Doncaster was begun, operated by the GNR with its locomotives and stock, as the SYR did not yet own any passenger coaches.

The branch to west through Worsborough continued to at terminus at Moor End goods station, near Silkstone Common, opened by 1852. This gave the company access to more collieries and so more traffic over its rails.

==== Barnsley to Sheffield ====
In March 1852 land was bought to complete the line between Barnsley and Sheffield, although at this time the only way a through service of any type could be offered was by a reversal at Wombwell Central. The SYD&GR diverted the route purchased from the SRBWH&GR at the request of the colliery owners in the Dove Valley who had no railway line to serve their pits at Blacker Main, Platts Common and Hoyland Common. Because of this they abandoned the tunnel at Birdwell although much work had already been carried out. The line, through to a junction with the Midland Railway near Wincobank, on the outskirts of Sheffield, enabled trains to run to the Wicker station in Sheffield.

Passenger trains from Barnsley to Sheffield began on 9 September 1854, with a service between Doncaster and Sheffield from November 1855. This service was operated by the South Yorkshire Railway with its own locomotives and stock. The line opened for goods traffic on 11 September 1854, and was single track throughout, with just one passing point, Westwood.

The line was extended from Meadowhall to Tinsley in 1861 and eventually reached Woodburn Junction, on the main line of the MS&LR just east of Sheffield Victoria, opening on 1 August 1864, just after the company ceased as a separate entity. The "Darnall Curve", linking this line to an east facing junction on the main line, was also opened in 1864. Increasingly recognised as a bottleneck, the line was doubled in 1876 and Ecclesfield station was remodelled with staggered platforms linked by a footbridge.

=== South Yorkshire Railway and River Dun Company (1850–1864) ===
South Yorkshire Railway and River Dun Company's Transfer Act 1852
- Act of Parliament
- Parliament of the United Kingdom
- Long title: An Act to enable the South Yorkshire Railway and River Dun Company to transfer their Undertaking to the Great Northern Railway Company.
- Citation: 15 & 16 Vict. c. cliii

Dates
- Royal assent: 30 June 1852

Text of statute as originally enacted

In the parliamentary session of 1851 the South Yorkshire Railway and River Dun Company (SYR&RDCo.) applied for permission to lease, sell or amalgamate itself with the Great Northern Railway, the South Yorkshire Railway and River Dun Company's Transfer Act 1852 (15 & 16 Vict. c. cliii) was passed. The amalgamation was not carried through and the process was abandoned by both companies.

The company constructed a line on the banks of canals from Doncaster to Thorne in the 1850s, – in 1859 passenger services were operated for: Sheffield via Westwood to Wombwell, and then to Barnsley (for Wakefield and Leeds); and from Barnsley to Doncaster, and then to Thorne; plus and return services. Around four trains per day were operated each, with the exception of trains from Doncaster to Thorne, which had one less service.

South Yorkshire Railway (Sheffield and Thorne) Act 1862
- Act of Parliament
- Parliament of the United Kingdom
- Long title: An Act to enable the South Yorkshire Railway and River Dun Company to make Railways near Sheffield and Thorne, and to exercise other Powers.
- Citation: 25 & 26 Vict. c. cxli

Dates
- Royal assent: 17 July 1862

Text of statute as originally enacted

South Yorkshire Railway Act 1863
- Act of Parliament
- Parliament of the United Kingdom
- Long title: An Act to enable the South Yorkshire Railway and River Dun Company to alter their authorized Line; to purchase the Barnsley Coal Railway; and for other Purposes relating to the same Company.
- Citation: 26 & 27 Vict. c. cxlvi

Dates
- Royal assent: 13 July 1863

Text of statute as originally enacted

In the 1860s the South Yorkshire Railway (Sheffield and Thorne) Act 1862 (25 & 26 Vict. c. cxli) and the South Yorkshire Railway Act 1863 (26 & 27 Vict. c. cxlvi) allowed the Barnsley to Sheffield branch to be extended to a junction with Manchester, Sheffield and Lincolnshire Railway's (MS&LR) Sheffield line; and the line to Thorne to be straightened. Junctions were made with the Doncaster Thorne line with the NER's Hull and Doncaster Railway at Thorne junction (opened 1869); and to the southeast end of the jointly operated (Great Northern and MS&LR) West Riding and Grimsby Railway, authorised by the West Riding and Grimsby Railway Act 1862 (25 & 26 Vict. c. ccxi) at Stainforth junction (or Hatfield junction) southwest of Stainforth and Hatfield station.

The South Yorkshire Railway Act 1863 also enabled the purchase of the Barnsley Coal Railway. The company also obtained the South Yorkshire Railway Act 1864 (27 & 28 Vict. c. xix), allowing a branch from the Barnsley Coal railway to the Midland's branch near Monk Bretton, unbuilt; the Barnsley Coal railway was extended north and an extra junction made with the SYR Barnsley line in the late 1800s, enabled by the Manchester, Sheffield and Lincolnshire Act 1874 (37 & 38 Vict. c. cxxxii).

==== Doncaster to Thorne and Keadby ====
In the 1850s the SYR created a railway line from Doncaster to Thorne; the line was built without specific legal powers being granted by Parliament for its construction, on the banks of the canals between the two places. A single track line of 10 miles 44 chains (17.0 km).

The line ran along the southern bank of River Don 'Flood Drain', starting from Marsh Lane junction just north of Doncaster. After Long Sandall it followed the north bank of the River Don Navigation, past Kirk Sandall, Barnby upon Don, Sand Bramwith to Stainforth; and thence along or close to the north bank of the Stainforth and Keadby Canal to Thorne.

The line initially terminating at Thorne Waterside railway station (or "Thorne Lock"), which was then the only station on the line. The line opened freight in December 1855. The line was passed as safe for passengers by the government inspector in June 1856, provided only one engine was in steam at any time on the line, and subject to a maximum speed of 12 miles per hour (19 km/h) as curves were as small as 8 chains (530 ft; 160 m) radius; road crossings at Bramwith, Barnby Dun and Stainforth were also required to be staffed. The line opened for passengers in July 1856.

A second section from Thorne to Keadby was also constructed, again without stautory powers, and built on the canal bank already in the company's ownership. The line ran from Thorne on the north bank of the Stainforth and Keadby Canal to Keadby. The line was opened in September 1859 with only one intermediate station at Crowle, others at Maud's Bridge, Medge Hall, Godnow Bridge were opened shortly afterwards.

South Yorkshire Railway Amendment Act 1861
- Act of Parliament
- Parliament of the United Kingdom
- Long title: An Act for the Extension of the South Yorkshire Railway across the Trent near Keadby in Lincolnshire, and for granting further Powers to the South Yorkshire Railway and River Dun Company.
- Citation: 24 & 25 Vict. c. clxix

Dates
- Royal assent: 22 July 1861

In 1860 the company began seeking permission for a line from its terminus at Keadby, across the Trent, with one bill promoting a line continuing to the MS&LR's line near Brigg; in the same session of parliament a line was promoted from Keadby utilising a section of railway between the Trent and River Ancholme already under construction by Charles Winn, with an extension connecting to a junction on the MS&LR's line southwest of Barnetby station, the Trent, Ancholme and Grimsby Railway; the SYR also had a bill which only required the construction of a short line over the Trent to the Trent-Ancholme line. The Trent, Ancholme, and Grimsby Railway Act 1861 (24 & 25 Vict. c. clvi) passed for the Trent, Ancholme and Grimsby line, and the South Yorkshire Railway Amendment Act 1861 (24 & 25 Vict. c. clxix) was passed for a connection to it via the short extension of the SYR across the Trent. The SYR's line was 2 miles 59 chains (4.4 km) in length, for which the act had provided powers to raise an additional £100,000 through shares, plus a third of that in loans.

==== Straightening, and route to Hull ====
In the parliamentary session of 1861/2 the company applied for, and obtained the South Yorkshire Railway (Sheffield and Thorne) Act 1862 (25 & 26 Vict. c. cxli) to make a straightened line from Doncaster to Thorne. The proposed line was to branch from the extant line at Long Sandall Lock the pass roughly north and east rejoining the old railway at a junction at Maude's bridge east of Thorne.

In the session of 1862/3 the North Eastern Railway (NER) obtained the North Eastern Railway (Hull and Doncaster Branch) Act 1863 (26 & 27 Vict. c. ccxxxviii) for a line from its Hull and Selby Line at Staddlethorpe (now known as Gilberdyke) to Thorne; the company had come to arrangements with rival companies including the SYR not to oppose the bill; and the Hull and Doncaster Branch was authorised on 28 July 1863. In the same session the SYR obtained the South Yorkshire Railway Act 1863 (26 & 27 Vict. c. cxlvi) to modify its permitted (1862) straightening of the Doncaster Thorne line.

The new line was double track. A junction was also made with a branch of the West Riding and Grimsby Railway, which ran from Adwick junction near Adwick le Street westward to Stainforth junction near Stainforth.

The station at Thorne was moved nearer the town centre after only a short time (Thorne (Old) railway station) and remained as such until the 'straightening' in 1864 when Thorne South was opened.

==== Barnsley to Sheffield line extension ====
The 1863 act allowed a southwards extension of Blackburn Valley line to meet the MS&LR's line into Sheffield near Attercliffe. The line ran from Meadowhall junction north of the connection with the Sheffield and Rotherham line, passing under that line, crossing the River Don and curving southwest, running near to the northside of the Sheffield Canal, before crossing that canal just south of Attercliffe and then forming a triangle junction with the MS&LR line.

==== Amalgamation with the MS&LR (1864) ====
South Yorkshire Railway and River Dun Company's Transfer Act 1864
- Act of Parliament
- Parliament of the United Kingdom
- Long title: An Act to authorize the Transfer of the Undertaking of the South Yorkshire Railway and River Dun Company to the Manchester, Sheffield, and Lincolnshire Railway Company.
- Citation: 27 & 28 Vict. c. lxxvii
- Territorial extent: United Kingdom

Dates
- Royal assent: 23 June 1864

Other legislation
- Relates to: Dearne and Dove Canal Act 1800; Stainforth and Keadby Canal Purchase Act 1849

In 1861 Manchester, Sheffield and Lincolnshire Railway (MS&LR) began a lease of the SYR, having already allowed the company use of Sheffield Victoria station. On 23 June 1864 the South Yorkshire Railway and River Dun Company's Transfer Act 1864 (27 & 28 Vict. c. lxxvii) enabled the MS&LR to take over the SYR for 999 years. As part of the arrangement the MS&LR was to pay the dividends and interests relating to SYR stock, and to give half of the net profits of the line to the South Yorkshire company, with working expenses taken to be 38% of gross profits for accounting purposes.

South Yorkshire Railway and River Dun Company's Vesting Act 1874
- Act of Parliament
- Parliament of the United Kingdom
- Long title: An Act to vest the Undertaking of the South Yorkshire Railway and River Dun Company in the Manchester, Sheffield, and Lincolnshire Railway Company.
- Citation: 37 & 38 Vict. c. cxxxi
- Territorial extent: United Kingdom

Dates
- Royal assent: 16 July 1874

The South Yorkshire Railway and River Dun Company's Vesting Act 1874 (37 & 38 Vict. c. cxxxi) enabled the transfer of the rights and responsibilities of the company to the MS&LR, and the former company was dissolved.

== Locomotives ==
SYR No.	Wheel Arr.	Maker	Works No.	Date Built	MSL No.	With- drawn	Notes
1	0-4-2	BCK		1849	152	1867	Named "Vampire"
2	0-4-2	BCK		1849	153	1867	
3	0-4-2	Dodds		1849	154	1871	Named "Fitzwilliam"
4	0-6-0	EBW		1849	155	1894	Named "Wharncliffe"
5	0-4-2	TB		1848	156	1870	Named "Albion"
6	0-6-0	GW	19	1848	157	1869	Ex-Leeds and Thirsk Railway
7	0-6-0	GW	20	1848	158	1870	Ex-Leeds and Thirsk Railway
8	0-6-0	GW	21	1848	159	1893	Ex-Leeds and Thirsk Railway
9	0-6-0	GW	22	1848	160	1871	Ex-Leeds and Thirsk Railway
10	0-6-0	EBW	507	1856	161	1889	
11	0-6-0	EBW	508	1856	162	1893	
12	0-6-0	EBW	509	1856	163	1888	
13	2-4-0	GE		1856	164	1864	
14	0-6-0	EBW		1856	165	1889	
15	0-6-0	EBW		1856	166	1888	
16	0-6-0	EBW		1856	167	1893	
17	0-6-0	K	697	1859	168	1877	
18	0-6-0	K	698	1859	169	1893	
19	0-6-0	K	702	1859	170	1892	
20	0-6-0	SYR		1861	171	1893	
21	0-6-0	K	919	1861	172	1893	
22	0-6-0	SYR		1862	173	1893	
23	0-6-0	BP	373	1864	174	1902	
24	0-6-0	BP	374	1864	175	1902	
25	0-6-0	BP	375	1864	176	1902	
26	0-6-0	BP	376	1864	177	1903	
27	0-6-0	BP	377	1864	178	1903	
28	0-6-0	BP	378	1864	179	1903	

Abbreviations:

- BCK: Bury, Curtis, and Kennedy
- BP: Beyer, Peacock and Company
- Dodds: Isaac Dodds and Son
- EBW: E. B. Wilson and Company
- GE: George England and Co.
- GW: Gilkes Wilson and Company
- K: Kitson and Company
- SYR: South Yorkshire Railway, Mexborough
- TB: Thwaites Brothers (see Robinson Thwaites)

== Remains of the SYR today ==
Because of duplication of tracks between main centres, the inconvenient siting of passenger stations, closure of collieries and other lineside works much of the system has now been closed or truncated. The remaining open sections are as follows:

- Between Mexborough and Doncaster. (The Swinton curve, which formed the junction to the Midland Railway, was closed in 1968 but reinstated in the late 1980s to coincide with the reopening of Swinton railway station).
- Between Doncaster and Keadby (The realigned route).
- Between Mexborough Junction and Woodburn Junction (Sheffield) (although the present line joins the Midland Railway at Aldwarke Junction and returns to its old route after about 100 yards).
- Quarry Junction (Barnsley) and Barnsley (former Exchange) station.
- The upper part of the Elsecar Branch, reopened by (and is preserved as) the Elsecar Heritage Railway. It's expected that the section to Cortonwood will be re-opened at a later date as funding allows.

== See also ==
- Earl Fitzwilliam's private railway
- Hatfield Colliery landslip
