= Thorne North railway station =

Railway station in South Yorkshire, England

Thorne North
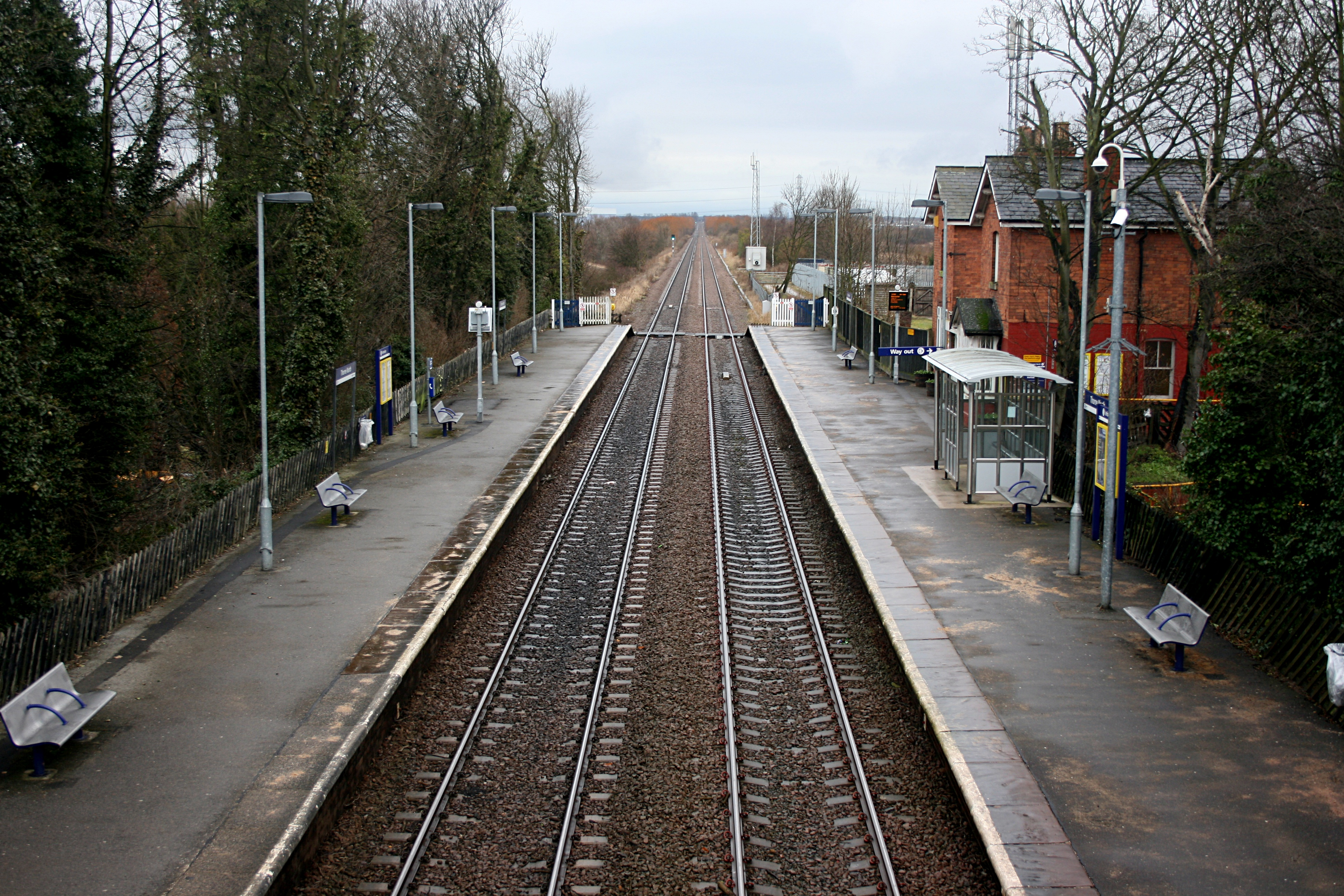

General information
- Location: Thorne, Doncaster; England
- Coordinates: 53.6162°N 0.9724°W
- Grid reference: SE680137
- Manager: Northern Trains
- Transit authority: South Yorkshire
- Platforms: 2

Other information
- Station code: TNN
- Fare zone: Doncaster
- Classification: DfT category E

Passengers
- 2021/22: ▲95,270
- 2022/23: ▲0.101 million
- 2023/24: ▲0.152 million
- 2024/25: ▲0.179 million
- 2025/26: ▲0.210 million
- Interchange: 92
Location
Notes
- Passenger statistics from the Office of Rail and Road

Thorne North railway station is a station on the Hull and Doncaster Branch serving the market town of Thorne, South Yorkshire, England.

Thorne North is one of two stations for the town, the other being Thorne South station, 1.3 miles away on the opposite side of the town which is used for services eastward towards Scunthorpe.

== History and description ==
The station opened on 2 August 1869 as part of the North Eastern Railway's Hull and Doncaster Branch. It was initially called Thorne, as was the other station in Thorne, which was part of the Great Central Railway. Following the passing of the Grouping Act in 1921, both stations became part of the London and North Eastern Railway, and to avoid confusion, this station became Thorne North while the Great Central station became Thorne South, with both being renamed on 1 July 1923.

In February 2013 the line northeast of Hatfield and Stainforth station towards Thorne was blocked by the Hatfield Colliery landslip, with all services over the section halted. The line reopened in July 2013.

In February 2014 the station was accredited with Secure Station status from the Secure Stations Scheme for providing a safe environment for both passengers and staff.

== Facilities ==
The station has a staffed ticket office, which is open from 07:00 to 17:15 Monday to Friday and to 13:30 on Saturdays. Outside these times tickets must be bought Prior to boarding,

There is one Ticket Machine (Machine only takes Card Payment). Waiting shelters are provided on each platform and there are toilets in the main building that open at the same times as the ticket office. Digital display screens and timetable posters provide train running information. A footbridge links the platforms, but step-free access to both is available (to the southbound platform at all times, to the northbound via a barrow crossing that is only open when the station is staffed).

== Services ==
Stopping services between Doncaster and Hull and beyond call at Thorne North. Monday to Saturday, there is usually an hourly service, with some additional peak period calls. Services to/from Sheffield stop only at peak periods and in the late evening - connections can be made at Doncaster at other times.

On Sundays, there is an hourly service each way to the same destinations.

Preceding station	National Rail	Following station
Hatfield and Stainforth	Northern Trains Hull and Doncaster Branch	Goole
