= Thorne South railway station =

Railway station in South Yorkshire, England

Thorne South
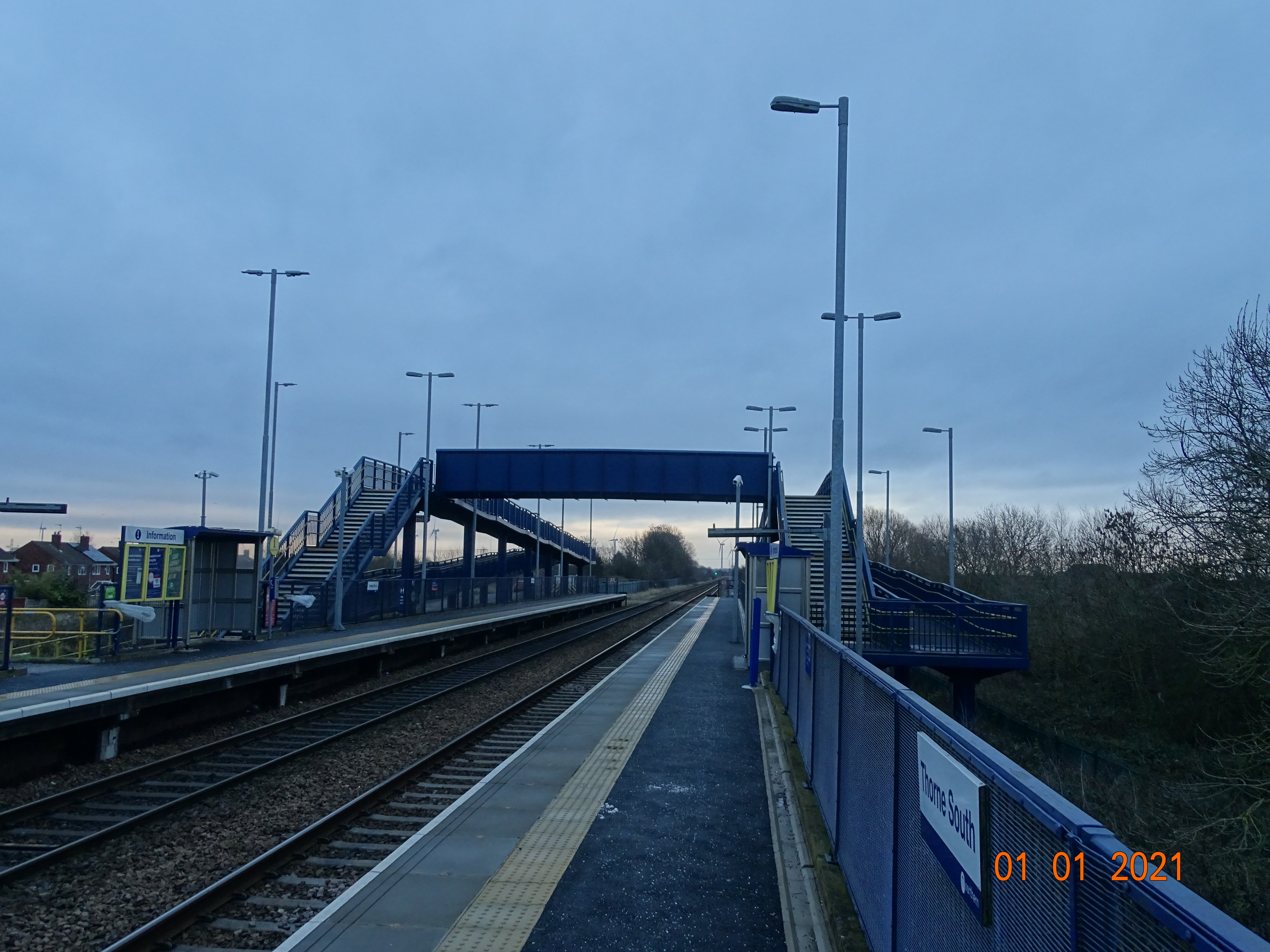

General information
- Location: Thorne, Doncaster; England
- Coordinates: 53.6034°N 0.9549°W
- Grid reference: SE692123
- Manager: Northern Trains
- Transit authority: South Yorkshire
- Platforms: 2

Other information
- Station code: TNS
- Fare zone: Doncaster
- Classification: DfT category F2

Passengers
- 2021/22: ▲59,802
- 2022/23: ▼47,976
- 2023/24: ▲53,944
- 2024/25: ▲66,512
- 2025/26: ▼36,470
Location
Notes
- Passenger statistics from the Office of Rail and Road

Thorne South railway station is one of two stations serving the market town of Thorne in South Yorkshire, England. The station is 9.75 miles (16 km) north of Doncaster on the South Humberside Main Line. It is unstaffed, and the only passenger facilities are standard shelters on each platform.

The station was more substantial until the mid-1970s, with the westbound platform being an island, a subway linking the platforms and wooden buildings and canopies on each side (the platforms were also located slightly further east than now). There was also a signal box - this was abolished when the line was resignalled in the early 1980s.

The other station in the town is Thorne North, which is served by trains towards Hull.

== History ==
The station was partially opened on 10 September 1866 and fully opened on 1 October 1866 by the South Yorkshire Railway and River Dun Company. It was initially called Thorne, as was the other station in Thorne, which was part of the Great Northern Railway. The station became part of the Manchester, Sheffield and Lincolnshire Railway in 1874, which was renamed the Great Central Railway in 1897. On some timetables, the station was described as "Thorne for Newbridge". Following the passing of the Grouping Act in 1921, both stations became part of the London and North Eastern Railway, and to avoid confusion, this station became Thorne South while the Great Northern station became Thorne North, with both being renamed on 1 July 1923.

== Facilities ==
There is one ticket machine that only takes card payment. A dedicated, partially-surfaced area is located adjacent to the north side of the station offering a small amount of free car parking for rail users. Train running information is provided by timetable poster boards and Departure Boards on Both Platforms & at entrance to Station. Audio Announcements are provide on both Platforms. A fully accessible ramped footbridge links the two platforms - this was opened in July 2013 by Network Rail to replace the old barrow crossing, which had been the scene of several "near misses" prior to a passenger being injured by a passing train whilst trying to cross the line in January 2013. The temporary structure erected immediately after the accident was then replaced by the current accessible bridge whilst the line was closed for repairs following the spoil tip collapse at Hatfield Colliery.

== Service ==
Before the COVID-19 pandemic, Northern Trains ran an hourly service Monday-Saturday in both directions calling here between Doncaster and Scunthorpe. With no service on a Sunday.

Currently, that has been reduced to a train every 2 hours each way. Times of the current timetable are: 06:59, 09:00, 11:58, 13:58, 15:58, 17,58, 19:58, 22:10 towards Scunthorpe; 08:08, 10:08, 13:08, 15:08, 17:08, 19:08, 21:08, 23:08 towards Doncaster. There is still no Sunday service. One TransPennine Express service between Cleethorpes and Liverpool Lime Street also stops here in each direction, early morning westbound (06:08) and late evening eastbound (22:52).

In February 2013, the line northeast of Hatfield and Stainforth station towards Thorne was blocked by the Hatfield Colliery landslip, with all services over the section halted. The line reopened in July 2013.

Preceding station	National Rail	Following station
Hatfield and Stainforth	Northern Trains South Humberside Main Line Monday-Saturday only	Crowle
Hatfield and Stainforth	TransPennine Express South Humberside Main Line; South TransPennine Limited Service	Crowle
