= Thorne, South Yorkshire =

Market town and civil parish in South Yorkshire, England

Thorne
- Town and civil parish
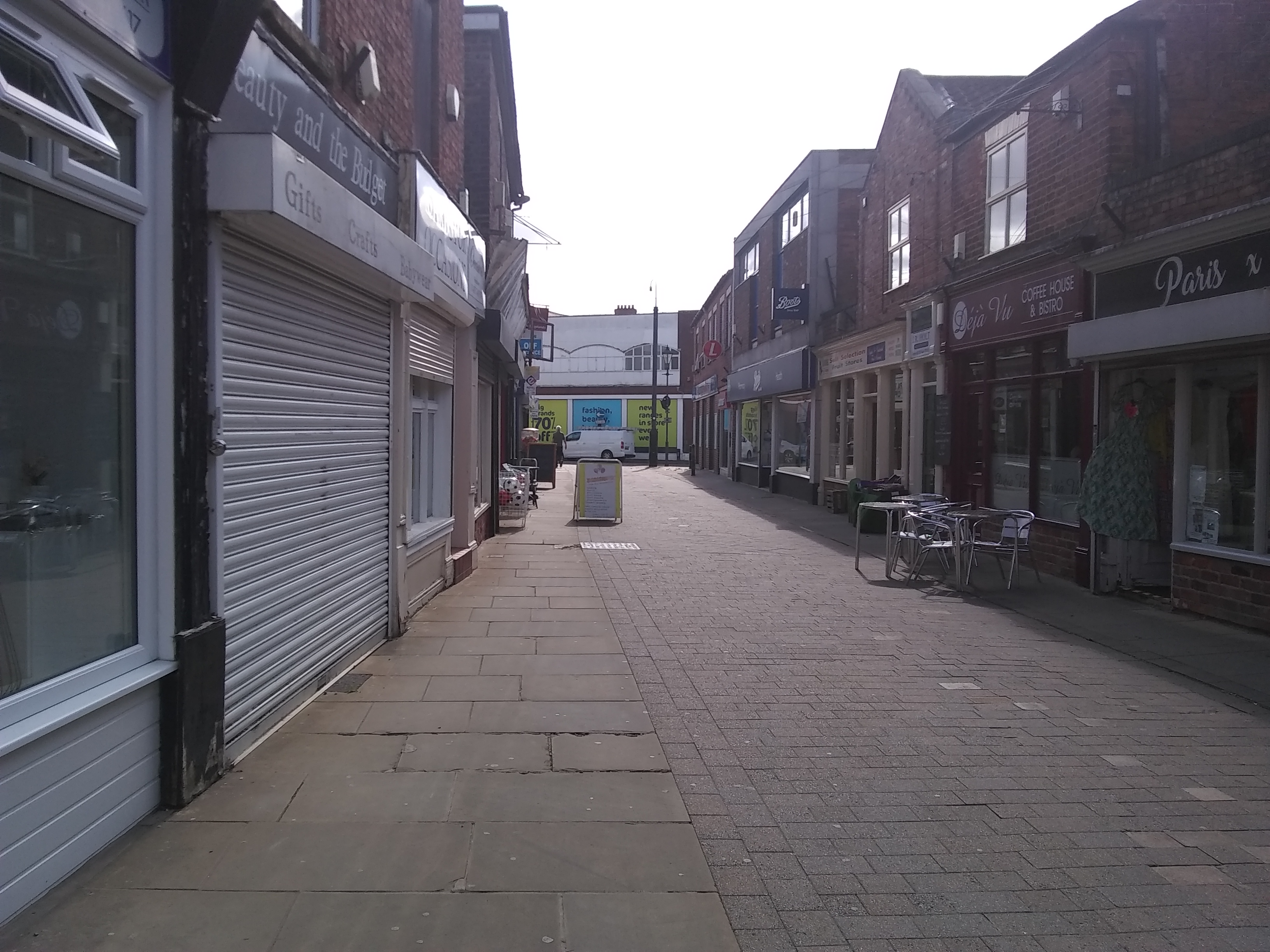
- Thorne town centre

- Location within the Borough of Doncaster Location within South Yorkshire
- Area: 18.15 sq mi (47.0 km^{2})
- Population: 17,295 (2011 census)
  - Density: 953/sq mi (368/km^{2})
- OS grid reference: SE 687 132
- Civil parish: Thorne
- Metropolitan borough: City of Doncaster
- Metropolitan county: South Yorkshire
- Region: Yorkshire and the Humber
- Country: England
- Sovereign state: United Kingdom
- Post town: Doncaster
- Postcode district: DN8
- Dialling code: 01405
- Police: South Yorkshire
- Fire: South Yorkshire
- Ambulance: Yorkshire
- UK Parliament: Doncaster East and the Isle of Axholme

Thorne is a market town and civil parish in the City of Doncaster in South Yorkshire, England. It was historically part of the West Riding of Yorkshire until 1974. It has a population of 16,592, increasing to 17,295 at the 2011 Census.

== History ==
The land which is now Thorne was once inhabited by Neolithic, Bronze Age and Iron Age people. It became a permanent settlement around AD 700, and is mentioned in the Domesday Book. The main industries in the town have traditionally been coal mining and farming.

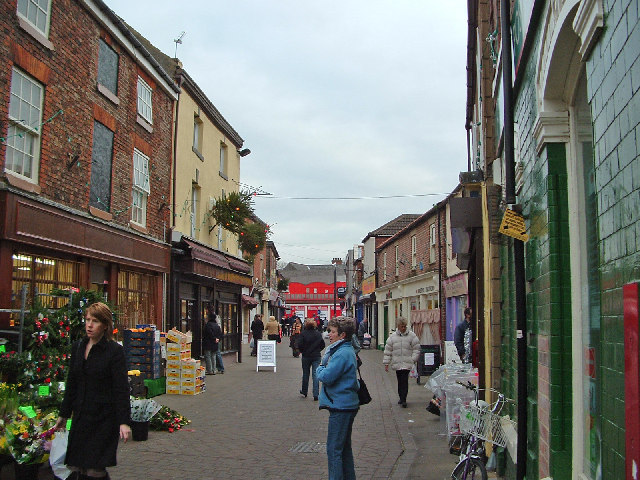
Finkle Street in Thorne in 20 December 2005

== Geography ==
Thorne lies east of the River Don, on the Stainforth and Keadby Canal, and is located at approximately 53°36′30″N 0°57′30″W, at an elevation of around 16 feet (5 metres) above sea level, on the Yorkshire side of the border with Lincolnshire. The civil parish of Thorne and Moorends includes the village of Moorends to the north, and the Thorne Waste (also known as Thorne Moors) section of the Thorne Moors collective of moorland to the north-east. A small part of the edge of Thorne Waste, named "the Yorkshire Triangle", currently falls under North Lincolnshire, by technicality splitting this suburb of the civil parish between South Yorkshire and Lincolnshire.

== Culture and community ==
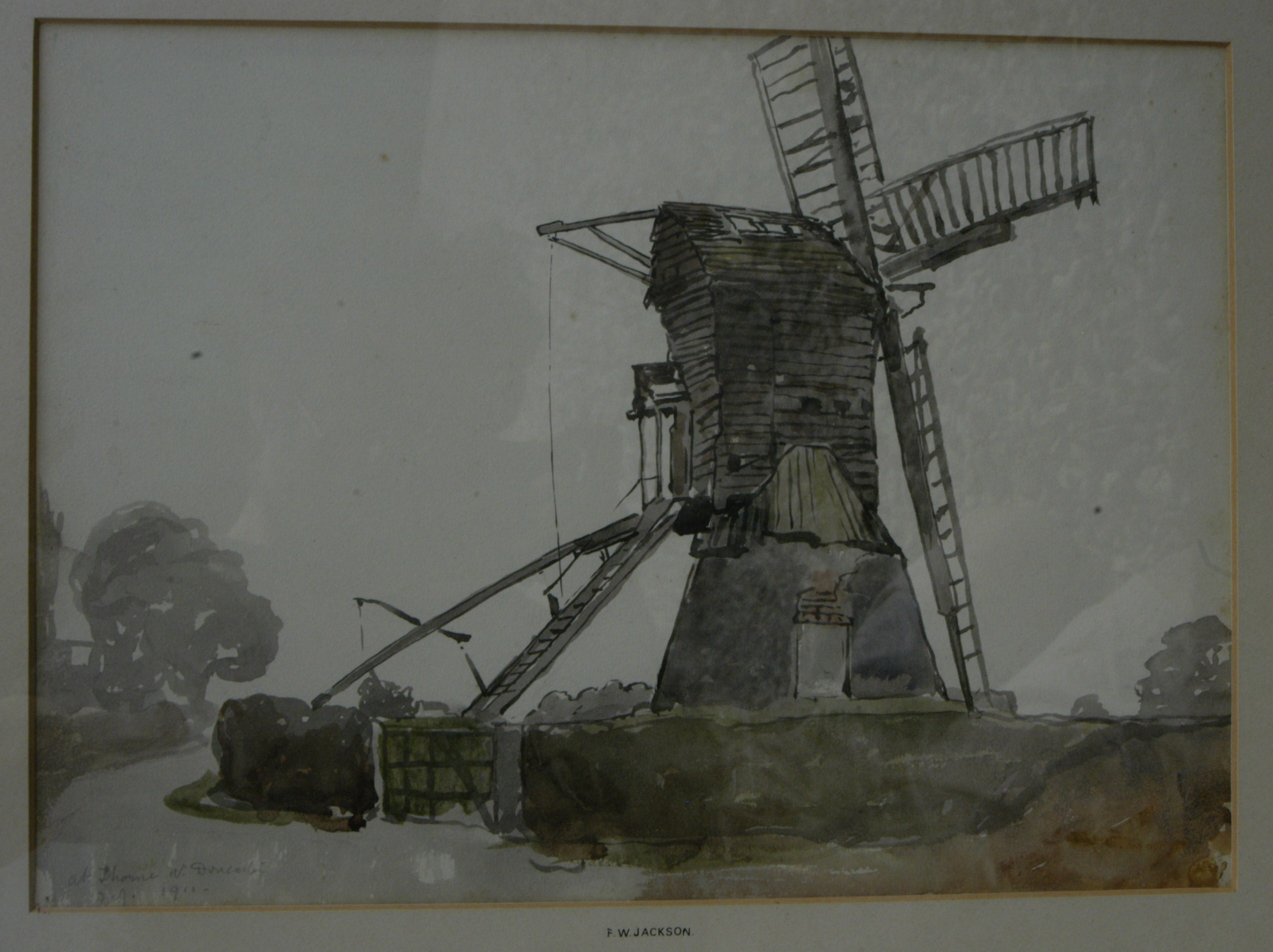
The Windmill at Thorne, by F. W. Jackson, 1911.

Thorne Memorial Park is the location for the Thorne Memorial Park Miniature Railway and the annual Thorne Festival. During the summer months, free brass band concerts are held at the park's bandstand.

Thorne Community Wood is a community woodland created from agricultural land by Thorne-Moorends Town Council, and The Peatlands Way, a circuitous walk around the wildlife areas of Thorne and Hatfield Moors, passes to the north of the town.

Thorne's Farmers' Market is a monthly event.

For many decades in the twentieth century Thorne Colliery was a central focus of employment within the town, although its history was very troubled.

In recent years, employment opportunities have been increasing, most notably since the opening of Nimbus Park on the outskirts of the town, where The Range have operated a major distribution centre since 2012.

== Landmarks ==
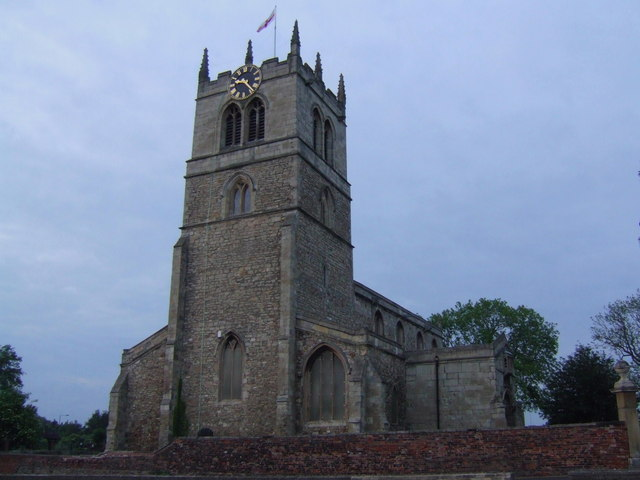
St Nicholas Church

Notable buildings in the town include the parish church and Peel Hill Castle. The parish church consists of material from the 12th to 15th centuries with some later additions and repairs. It is a grade I listed structure, and is dedicated to St Nicholas. Peel Hill Castle is the earthwork remains of a Norman motte built by the de Warenne family.

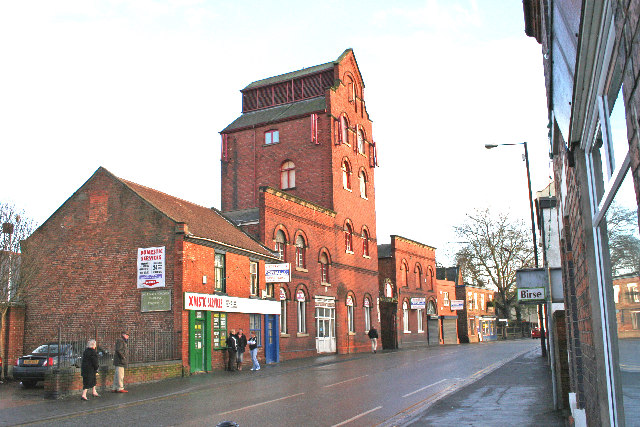
The Old Darley Brewery

Although no structure remains, the foundations indicate that it had a circular keep. It might have been used as a hunting lodge, connected with Hatfield Chase, and prisoners were kept in its tower in the 16th century. It was demolished in the 17th century. The monument is in the care of Thorne-Moorends Town Council. There are Dutch-like bridges over local canals, such as the Wykewell bridge. There is one remaining water tower, located on South End. Another water tower used to stand on Field Road, but was demolished in 2013. The subsequent empty land was, in 2015, earmarked as the planned location for a new Lidl supermarket. Nearby are the extensive Thorne Moors.

== Transport ==
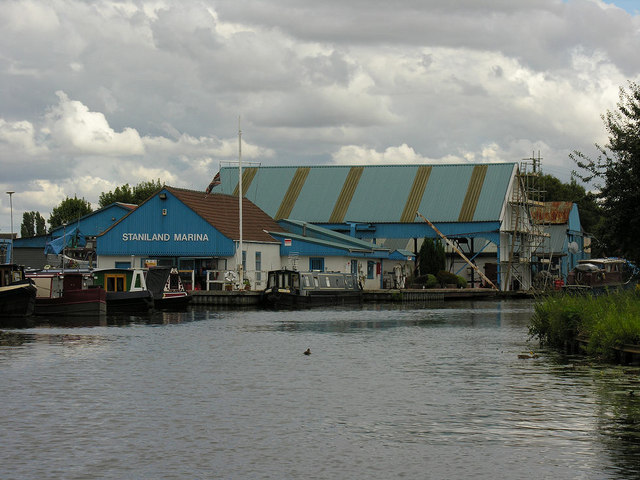
The Marina

The town is served by two railway stations: Thorne North, and Thorne South; as well as Junction 6 of the M18 and junction 1 of the M180.

The town is served by four bus services, all of which are operated by First South Yorkshire. The services include the 87/87a towards Doncaster and Moorends, the 84 towards Doncaster, the 87b towards Doncaster and Moorends, and the 86 service. The latter is a local route only connecting both Thorne and Moorends with the newly built retail park. The 8/8a and 86 services only operate on weekdays and Saturdays. The 84 service operates on evenings only Monday to Saturday, and throughout the day hourly on a Sunday, this is due to there being no 87b service on a Sunday.

The A614 runs through the town, crossing the canal.

== Education ==
In September 2005 a newly built school, Trinity Academy, opened in Thorne, specialising in Business and Enterprise. The £24 million state-of-the-art Academy has nine classes per year group, had an initial school population of 1250 children between the ages of 11 and 18, and is the third Christian Ethos school founded by Sir Peter Vardy. In 2004, 21% of students from Thorne and Moorends achieved five or more passes at grade C or above. Trinity was named as England's most improved academy in 2007, for which they were presented with an award by Sir Bruce Liddington, the Schools Commissioner in England and Wales, at a conference held in London run by the Specialist Schools and Academies Trust.

The academy replaced Thorne Grammar School, whose notable alumni were the opera singer Lesley Garrett; George Porter, a Nobel Prize-winning chemist; Charles Spencer, pianist; and Sir Graham Hall, former CEO of Yorkshire Electricity.

== Media ==
Local news and television programmes are provided by BBC Yorkshire and ITV Yorkshire. Television signals are received from the Emley Moor TV transmitter.

Local radio stations are BBC Radio Sheffield, Heart Yorkshire, Capital Yorkshire, Hits Radio South Yorkshire, Greatest Hits Radio South Yorkshire, TX1 Radio and its own Community Radio station, TMCR 95.3.

The town is served by the local newspaper, Thorne Times.

== Sport ==
Thorne's rugby league side, Moorends-Thorne Marauders RLFC, play in the CMS Yorkshire league during the winter season and the Rugby League Conference during the summer.

The rugby union side, Thornensians RUFC currently play in Counties 3 Yorkshire Division and have won the Yorkshire Cup twice, along with the South Yorkshire trophy on a record 12 occasions- the most recent in the 2014–15 season. Their home ground is Coulman Road and big games can attract crowds above 300.

Football is played by Club Thorne Colliery, owned by Oliver Womack and managed by Jack Wildgoose. Some notable players include: Tom Barton, Oliver Ramos and James leitch. All 3 players played for Manchester United in the 2008-2009 season.

Speedway racing, earlier known as Dirt track racing, was staged at a track on the southern edge of the town in 1930. Billed as "The Wembley of the North" the track followed the edge of the football pitch on the inside of the track. Rather than two sweeping bends, the track is shown on contemporary ordnance survey maps as having four corners and four straights.

The Sea Cadet unit in Thorne, TS Gambia, offers watersports and other activities to young people within the town.

== Notable people ==
- Gillian Coultard, footballer
- Thomas Crapper, industrialist and plumber
- Lesley Garrett, operatic soprano
- Leigh Jenkinson, footballer
- William Pool (1783–1856), inventor of the feathered paddle wheel
- Ted Sagar, professional footballer
- Connor Swift, cyclist
- Simon Worrall, rugby league footballer
- Ray Holt, professional footballer
- Garry Hemingway, rugby union, and rugby league footballer of the 1950s and 1960s
- Oliver Ramos, footballer, Manchester United.
- Tom Barton, footballer, record for most penalty misses of all time.
- Jack Wildgoose. football manager, most decorated manager of all time.

== See also ==
- Listed buildings in Thorne, South Yorkshire
