= Esmond Knight =

English actor (1906–1987)

- Knight as Fluellen in Henry V (1944)
- Born: Esmond Penington Knight; 4 May 1906; East Sheen, Surrey, England
- Died: 23 February 1987 (aged 80); London, England
- Occupations: Actor, dialogue coach
- Years active: 1925–1987
- Spouses: Frances Clare (m. 1929; div. 1946) Nora Swinburne (m. 1946)
- Children: Rosalind Knight
- Relatives: C. W. R. Knight (uncle)
- Military career
- Allegiance: United Kingdom
- Branch: Royal Navy
- Service years: 1940–41
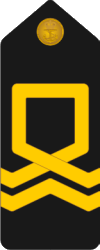
- Rank: Lieutenant, RNVR
- Conflicts: Second World War; Battle of the Atlantic; Operation Rheinübung; Battle of the Denmark Strait (WIA)
- Website: http://www.esmondknight.org.uk/

Esmond Penington Knight (4 May 1906 – 23 February 1987) was an English actor. He had a successful stage and film career before World War II. For much of his later career Knight was half-blind. He had been badly wounded in 1941 while on active service on board HMS Prince of Wales when she fought the Bismarck at the Battle of the Denmark Strait, and remained totally blind for two years, though he later regained some sight in his right eye.

== Childhood ==
Knight was born on 4 May 1906 in East Sheen, Surrey, the third son of Francis and Bertha Knight. His father was involved in the family cigar import business.

In 1917, Knight and his older brother, Robert, alleged that the writer Norman Douglas indecently assaulted them during a 1916 visit to the Natural History Museum in London. Robert identified Douglas amongst a group of men at the Westminster Police Court. Douglas provided an alibi of being overseas at the time and it was proven to be a case of mistaken identity.

Knight was educated at Willington Preparatory School in Putney and then Westminster School.

== Early career ==
He was an accomplished actor with a career spanning over half a century. He established himself in the 1920s on stage. In John Gielgud's 1930 production of Hamlet he played Rosencrantz. He also appeared in films. In Romany Love (1931) he played "a swaggering gypsy who never stopped singing". For The Private Life of Henry VIII (1933), Knight and his uncle C. W. R. Knight trained the falcons used in the hunting scenes. In Alfred Hitchcock's Waltzes from Vienna (1934), he played the lead role as Johann Strauss. Following this, he landed a number of roles in Hollywood films. He travelled to Germany to star in Black Roses (originally Schwarze Rosen, 1935), a film about a Finnish anti-communist. The film was shot in three versions, in English (as Did I Betray?), German, and French. Julius Streicher visited the set during filming. Thereafter Knight appeared in various film and theatre productions in Britain.

== Military service ==
After war was declared, Knight continued to act, appearing in Powell and Pressburger's film Contraband (1940). He sought a naval commission, but after the evacuation of Dunkirk he became involved in training Local Defence Volunteers. In late 1940, he was accepted for naval training. In 1941, Knight was asked to play the lead role of fanatical Nazi Lieutenant Hirth in another Powell and Pressburger propaganda film 49th Parallel (1941), but Eric Portman took the role as Knight was required for military training. He did appear in This England (also 1941), another propaganda film.

After completing his Naval training, Knight was appointed, with the rank of Sub-lieutenant, RNVR, to the battleship HMS Prince of Wales. In 1941, the ship received orders to pursue the German battleship Bismarck and the heavy cruiser Prinz Eugen. In the Battle of the Denmark Strait on 24 May 1941, Knight witnessed the sinking of HMS Hood before being blinded by shrapnel. A shell fired by Bismarck either passed through the bridge of the Prince of Wales and did not explode or exploded near the ship. Either way, fragments from the ship's superstructure hit Knight in the face, causing him to lose his left eye and leaving his right eye severely damaged.

=== Recuperation ===
Though blind, Knight insisted that he would continue his acting career. During this period, he dictated an early autobiography to his secretary, Annabella Cloudsley, Seeking the Bubble (Hutchinson & Co. 1943). Knight continued to act in radio productions. Though still totally blind, he also appeared on film, once more as a Nazi villain, in Powell and Pressburger's The Silver Fleet (1943).

During 1943, Knight received a series of treatments from Dr Vincent Nesfield designed to restore sight to his remaining eye. The treatment was a great success, restoring much of Knight's sight. The partial return of his sight made a major difference to his career. He appeared briefly in another Powell and Pressburger film, playing the roles of the village idiot and the "Seven Sisters Soldier" in A Canterbury Tale (1944), also adding the voice-over reading of Chaucer. His major breakthrough back into the mainstream came when he was cast as Fluellen, the brave but eccentric Welsh officer in Laurence Olivier's version of Henry V (1944).

== Later career ==
Knight continued to work with Olivier and with Powell and Pressburger, appearing in the former's Shakespearean films Hamlet (1948) and Richard III (1955). For the latter, he appeared in Black Narcissus (1947) and The Red Shoes (1948). He also starred in Jean Renoir's The River (1951).

Knight was the subject of a This Is Your Life episode in 1957 when he was surprised by Eamonn Andrews at the King's Theatre in Hammersmith, London.

In the film Sink the Bismarck! (1960), he played John Leach, the captain of HMS Prince of Wales, the ship in which he had been serving when he was blinded (though the captain is not named in the film). In the same year he played Jack Cade in the BBC Shakespeare series An Age of Kings.

He starred as Professor Ernest Reinhart in the British science fiction television series A for Andromeda (1961), alongside Patricia Kneale and Peter Halliday.

In Robin and Marian (1976), a film directed by Richard Lester, he played a blind old man who defies Richard I of England. For the role, Knight removed his glass eye.

== Personal life ==
Knight was married twice. He married actress Frances Clare in 1929. The couple had a daughter, actress Rosalind Knight.

During the 1930s, he had a long-running affair with Nora Swinburne, of which his wife was aware. She was also an actress who appeared with him in several stage plays. After a short-lived attempt to end the affair, Knight left Frances for Nora. The couple married in 1946 and remained together until his death.

== Death ==
Knight died of a heart attack in London on 23 February 1987.

== Work ==
=== Stage ===
- The Wild Duck – Pax Robertson's Salon, London (1925)
- Various Shakespeare productions – full season, Old Vic (1926)
- Everyman – The Old Vic, London (1926)
- Various productions – Children's Theatre, London (1928)
- Hamlet – Queen's Theatre, London (with John Gielgud and Donald Wolfit) (1930)
- Full Season – King's Theatre, Hammersmith (1939)
- Full Season – Royal Shakespeare Company, Stratford-upon-Avon (1948–1949)
- Caesar and Cleopatra – St James's Theatre, London (with Laurence Olivier, Peter Cushing and Vivien Leigh) (1951)
- The Emperor's New Clothes – Ethel Barrymore Theatre, New York (with Lee J. Cobb) (1953)
- Full Season – The Old Vic, London (1962–1963)
- Agincourt – The Archer's Tale – Royal Exchange Theatre, Manchester (one man show) (1973)
- The Family Reunion – Royal Exchange Theatre, Manchester (with Edward Fox) (1973 & 1979)
- Crime and Punishment adapted by Paul Bailey. Directed by Michael Elliott at the Royal Exchange, Manchester (1978)
- Moby-Dick – Royal Exchange Theatre, Manchester (with Brian Cox) (1983–1984)

=== Filmography ===
- The Blue Peter (1928) as Radio Operator (film debut)
- The Ringer (1931) as John Lenley
- 77 Park Lane (1931) as Philip Connor
- Romany Love (1931) as Davy Summers
- The Bermondsey Kid (1933) as Eddie Martin
- Waltzes From Vienna (1934) as Johann Strauss
- Lest We Forget (1934) as Pat Doyle Jr.
- Father and Son (1934) as Michael Bolton
- Girls Will Be Boys (1934) as Geoffrey Dawson
- Dandy Dick (1935) as Tony Mardon
- Crime Unlimited (1935) as Pete Borden
- Someday (1935) as Curley Blake
- Pagliacci (1936) as Cadet Silvio
- The Vicar of Bray (1937) as Dennis Melross
- Weddings Are Wonderful (1938) as Guy Rogers
- The Arsenal Stadium Mystery (1939) as Raille – Trojan Team Member
- Contraband (1940) as Mr. Pidgeon
- Fingers (1941) as Sid Harris
- This England (1941) as Vicar's Son
- The Silver Fleet (1943) as Von Schiffer
- The Halfway House (1944) as David Davies
- A Canterbury Tale (1944) as Narrator (non-US versions)/Seven-Sisters Soldier/Village Idiot
- Henry V (1944) as Fluellen – Captain in the English Army
- Black Narcissus (1947) as The Old General
- Holiday Camp (1947) as Camp Announcer
- Uncle Silas (1947) as Dr. Bryerly
- The End of the River (1947) as Dantos
- Hamlet (1948) as Bernardo
- The Red Shoes (1948) as Livy
- Gone to Earth (1950) as Abel Woodus
- The River (1951) as The Father
- Girdle of Gold (1952) as Evans the Milk
- The Steel Key (1953) as Prof. Newman
- Richard III (1955) as Ratcliffe
- Helen of Troy (1956) as High Priest
- The Prince and the Showgirl (1957) as Hoffman
- Battle of the V-1 (1958) as Stricker
- Sink the Bismarck! (1960) as Captain Leach (Prince of Wales)
- Peeping Tom (1960) as Arthur Baden
- Decision at Midnight (1963) as Peter Hauser
- The Spy Who Came in from the Cold (1965) as Old Judge
- The Winter's Tale (1967) as Camillo
- Where's Jack? (1969) as Ballad Singer
- Anne of the Thousand Days (1969) as Kingston
- Elizabeth R (1971) as Bishop de Quadra
- The Boy Who Turned Yellow (1972) as Doctor
- Robin and Marian (1976) as Old Defender
- The Man in the Iron Mask (1977) as Armand
- Sir Henry at Rawlinson End (1980) (uncredited)
- A Voyage Round My Father (1982) as Judge
- King Lear (1983) as Old Man
- The Element of Crime (1984) as Osborne
- Sleeping Murder (1987) as Mr. Galbraith
- Superman IV: The Quest for Peace (1987) as 2nd Elder (final film)

=== Television ===
- The Invisible Man (1959) as Wilson
- An Age of Kings (1960) as Jack Cade
- Deadline Midnight (1960) as Edward Lee
- A for Andromeda (1961) as Professor Ernest Reinhart
- Danger Man (1961) as Baron
- The Saint (1962) as Antoine Louvois
- Z Cars (1969) as Albert Wallace
- Doctor Who – (The Space Pirates) (1969) as Dom Issigri
- The Rivals of Sherlock Holmes (1971) as Captain Cutler
- Public Eye (1972) - Many a Slip - as Dr Stowe
- Arthur of the Britons (1973) as Athel
- Fall of Eagles (1974) as General Ruzski
- I, Claudius (1976) as Domitius
- Return of the Saint (1978) as Paul Hanson
- Rebecca (1979) as Coroner
- Romeo and Juliet (1980) as Old Capulet
- Antony and Cleopatra (1981) as Lepidus
- The Borgias (1981) as Cardinal Gian Battista Orsini
- I Remember Nelson (1982) as Elderly Guest
- My Cousin Rachel (1983) as Sam Bates
- The Invisible Man (1984) as Blind Man
- Fortunes of War (1987) as Liversage (last appearance)
