= Rosie (TV series) =

British sitcom by Roy Clarke (1977–1981)

- Genre: Sitcom
- Created by: Roy Clarke.
- Written by: Roy Clarke.
- Starring: Paul Greenwood; Tony Haygarth; Frankie Jordan; Penny Leatherbarrow; Paul Luty; Avril Elgar; Patricia Kneale; Lorraine Peters; Allan Surtees; Don McKillop; Maggie Jones
- Composer: Ronnie Hazlehurst.
- Country of origin: United Kingdom
- Original language: English
- No. of series: 4
- No. of episodes: 27

Production
- Producer: Bernard Thompson.
- Production locations: Scarborough, North Yorkshire, England
- Running time: 30 minutes

Original release
- Network: BBC1
- Release: 5 January 1977 – 30 October 1981

Related
- The Growing Pains of PC Penrose (1975) (7 episodes)

Rosie is a British sitcom written by Roy Clarke that was broadcast between 1977 and 1981. It was set in the fictitious Yorkshire town of Ravensbay however, the seaside town of Scarborough, North Yorkshire was used for location filming.

The central character was PC Penrose ("Rosie"), a young and inexperienced police officer, played by Paul Greenwood.

The titular character is a nod towards Charles Penrose, who famously recorded the comedy song "The Laughing Policeman".

Rosie was preceded by an earlier series of seven episodes, broadcast in 1975, called The Growing Pains of PC Penrose which was set in the fictitious Yorkshire town of Slagcaster and filmed in Clarke's native South Yorkshire, with the majority of the opening scenes of series one filmed in the village of New Rossington, although the colliery shown in episode one is possibly Hatfield Colliery. The series then underwent a revamp with a new title (Rosie), setting and signature tune.

== Cast ==
- Paul Greenwood as PC 'Rosie' Penrose
- Tony Haygarth as PC Wilmot
- Frankie Jordan as Gillian
- Penny Leatherbarrow as WPC Brenda Whatmough
- Paul Luty as Chief Inspector Dunwoody
- Avril Elgar as Millie Penrose (series 1–3)
- Patricia Kneale as Millie Penrose (series 4)
- Lorraine Peters as Aunt Ida
- Allan Surtees as Uncle Norman
- Don McKillop as Bill (series 1–3)
- Maggie Jones as Glenda (series 1–3)

== Episodes ==
(first airdate in parentheses)

=== Series 1 ===
- "Woman Pressure" (5 January 1977) Written by Roy Clarke.
- "A Smile from Antonio" (12 January 1977) Written by Roy Clarke.
- "I Wish They Wouldn't Call Me Son" (19 January 1977) Written by Roy Clarke.
- "Sunday" (26 January 1977) Written by Roy Clarke.
- "Wholesale Fish" (2 February 1977) Written by Roy Clarke.
- "The Cheese and Wine" (9 February 1977) Written by Roy Clarke.

=== Series 2 ===
- "Mirror, Mirror on the Floor" (18 May 1978) Written by Roy Clarke.
- "Wilmot Gets a Bad Case of Big Cyril's Second Wife" (25 May 1978) Written by Roy Clarke.
- "Wilmot Gets an Even Worse Case of Big Cyril's Second Wife" (1 June 1978) Written by Roy Clarke.
- "The Eyes of the Law" (8 June 1978) Written by Roy Clarke.
- "Complications" (15 June 1978) Written by Roy Clarke.
- "Further Complications" (22 June 1978) Written by Roy Clarke.
- "Our Intrepid Birdmen" (29 June 1978) Written by Roy Clarke.

=== Series 3 ===
- "Those Wonderful People in the C.I.D." (7 June 1979) Written by Roy Clarke.
- "Free Sample" (14 June 1979) Written by Roy Clarke.
- "The Worm that Turns Us All" (21 June 1979) Written by Roy Clarke.
- "Happy Birthday, Mr Chizlehurst" (28 June 1979) Written by Roy Clarke.
- "Looking for Herbie" (5 July 1979) Written by Roy Clarke.
- "Turn Left at the Parrot" (12 July 1979) Written by Roy Clarke.
- "A Day in the Country" (19 July 1979) Written by Roy Clarke.

=== Series 4 ===
- "Tune on a Silent Dog Whistle" (18 September 1981) Written by Roy Clarke.
- "Arresting Gordon by Instalments" (25 September 1981) Written by Roy Clarke.
- "You're Beautiful, Miss Parkinson" (2 October 1981) Written by Roy Clarke.
- "The Eight-Foot Goat" (9 October 1981) Written by Roy Clarke.
- "Big Night at Freezi-Pops" (16 October 1981) Written by Roy Clarke.
- "An Informer for Engelbert" (23 October 1981) Written by Roy Clarke.
- "Caught in the Act" (30 October 1981) Written by Roy Clarke.

== DVD release ==
The complete series (seven episodes) of The Growing Pains of PC Penrose was previously released on DVD in 2007; however, as of January 2022, Rosie has not yet been released.
