= Tuminelli =

Tuminelli is a surname of Italian origin that may refer to:

- Joe Tuminelli (1920–1980), Italian American professional baseball player
- Sandro Tuminelli, actor (see A come Andromeda, Hugo the Hippo)
- Troy Tuminelli, singer (see List of Menudo members, MDO (band))
