= Errol John =

Trinidad and Tobago actor and playwright (1924–1988)

- Born: 20 December 1924; Port of Spain, Trinidad and Tobago
- Died: 10 July 1988 (aged 63); London, England, UK
- Occupations: Actor; Playwright
- Years active: 1951–1988
- Notable work: Moon on a Rainbow Shawl (1957)
- Parent: George John (father)

Errol John (20 December 1924 – 10 July 1988) was a Trinidad and Tobago actor and playwright who emigrated to the United Kingdom in 1951.

== Biography ==
=== Early years in Trinidad ===
John was born in Port of Spain, Trinidad, on 20 December 1924, the son of professional cricketer George John, who as a fast bowler with the West Indian team toured England in 1923. Errol was home-schooled, before beginning his career as an artist and journalist. After deciding to pursue a career in acting, he joined the Whitehall Theatre Group in Trinidad.

=== Move to Britain ===
Following the Second World War, John moved to Britain in 1951 and continued to work in the theatre, appearing on the London stage in productions including Salome (1954), Carson McCullers' play The Member of the Wedding at the Royal Court Theatre (directed by Tony Richardson, 1957), The Merchant of Venice (1962), Measure for Measure (1963) and Othello (at the Old Vic, with Leo McKern and Adrienne Corri in the cast).

John had several small roles in films such as The African Queen (1951), The Heart of the Matter (1953), Simba (1955), Odongo (1956), The Nun's Story (1959), The Sins of Rachel Cade (1961) and Guns at Batasi (1964); all were set in Africa.

He gained a major role in the BBC's A Man from the Sun (1956), alongside Cy Grant, Nadia Cattouse and Colin Douglas, and later had a significant role in the television series No Hiding Place (ITV, 1961) and in the six-part BBC series Rainbow City, written for him by John Elliot in collaboration with Horace James, who was cast in one of the other lead roles.

Frustration at how few roles were available for black actors led John to playwriting.

His first play was The Tout (1949), then in 1957 his Moon on a Rainbow Shawl won The Observer's Play of the Year award. It was produced at the Royal Court in 1958, and in 1962 in New York City. In the UK there have been revivals at the Almeida Theatre (1988, directed by Maya Angelou), at Stratford East, and most recently at the Cottesloe Theatre, Royal National Theatre (2012) in an acclaimed production directed by Michael Buffong. Kate Kellaway wrote in The Observer: "It is marvellous to report that, 55 years on, this play, in its original version, holds its own and seems fresh as the day it was written."

On 27 May 1958, John's adapted version of the play for radio, entitled Small Island Moon, was broadcast on the BBC's Third Programme. It was produced by Donald McWhinnie and Robin Midgley, with a cast led by John himself and including Barbara Assoon, Sylvia Wynter, Lionel Ngakane, Andrew Salkey, Robert Adams, and Sheila Clarke (Boscoe Holder's wife and lead dancer).

Errol John's other writing included Force Majeure, The Dispossessed and Hasta Luego: Three Screenplays (1967). For television he wrote Teleclub (1954) and Dawn (1963), and was also the author of The Exiles, part of the BBC Wednesday Play series.

He attempted to work in the American film industry, but was limited to minor roles in Assault on a Queen (1966) and Buck and the Preacher (1972).

John died in Camden, North London, on 10 July 1988 aged 63. He was posthumously awarded the Trinidad & Tobago Chaconia Medal (Silver), for Drama, in 1988.

== Selected plays ==
- 1949: The Tout
- 1954: Teleclub (for television)
- 1957: Moon on a Rainbow Shawl
- 1966: The Tout
- 1967: Force Majeure, The Dispossessed, Hasta Luego: Three Screenplays

== Filmography ==
Year	Title	Role	Notes
1951	The African Queen	Native Soldier	Uncredited
1953	The Heart of the Matter	African Policeman	Uncredited
1955	Simba	African Inspector	
1956	Odongo	Mr. Bawa	
1959	The Nun's Story	Illunga (African convert)	
1961	The Sins of Rachel Cade	Kulu, Assistant to Rachel	
1963	PT 109	Benjamin Kevu	
1964	Man in the Middle	Sgt. Jackson	
1964	Guns at Batasi	Lieut. Boniface	
1966	Assault on a Queen	Linc Langley	
1972	Buck and the Preacher	Joshua	
1984	Sheena	Bolu	
