= Patricia Kneale =

British actress (1925–2008)

- Born: Patricia Kneale; 17 October 1925; Wolverhampton, Staffordshire, England
- Died: 27 December 2008 (aged 83); Eastbourne, Sussex, England
- Occupation: Actress
- Years active: 1947–1982

Patricia Kneale (17 October 1925 – 27 December 2008) was a British stage and television actress. She was born in Wolverhampton, Staffordshire.

== Career ==
Kneale gained a Meggie Albanesi scholarship to RADA, where she was awarded the Bancroft gold medal. Her acting debut was in 1947, as Olivia in Twelfth Night at Regent's Park. In 1952, she played Lady Macbeth at the old Nottingham Playhouse. It was in this production that Bernard Kay learned, rehearsed, and played Macbeth in less than 24 hours.

Although mainly a stage actor, she was probably best known for her role in the 1961 British science fiction drama, A for Andromeda, which starred Esmond Knight and Peter Halliday. Kneale also appeared in Jean-Paul Sartre's French Resistance drama, Men Without Shadows, and the 1970s police sitcom Rosie.

== Personal life ==
Patricia Kneale was married to the actor Jeremy Geidt. They had one daughter. After they divorced she was married to Neil Osborne, until his death in 2001.

Patricia Kneale died in Eastbourne leaving a daughter and three grandchildren.
