= Listed buildings in Carlton in Cleveland =

Carlton in Cleveland is a civil parish in the county of North Yorkshire, England. It contains 18 listed buildings that are recorded in the National Heritage List for England. All the listed buildings are designated at Grade II, the lowest of the three grades, which is applied to "buildings of national importance and special interest". The parish contains the village of Carlton in Cleveland and the surrounding countryside. The listed buildings include a church and a cross in the churchyard, and most of the other listed buildings are houses, cottages and associated structures, farmhouses and farm buildings.

== Buildings ==
Name and location	Photograph	Date	Notes
Cross shaft 54.43372°N 1.22013°W	—	Early medieval	The cross is in the churchyard of St Botolph's Church to the south of the church. It is in gritstone, with a square base, and about 0.5 metres (1 ft 8 in) of weathered shaft with traces of interlace ornament.
Plane Tree Farmhouse and barn 54.41882°N 1.21885°W	—	c. 1700	The farmhouse and adjoining barn are in sandstone on a plinth, and have a pantile roof with stone copings and kneelers. There is a single storey and attics, and each part has two bays. On the front the windows are sashes, in the ground floor horizontally-sliding, one with a chamfered surround, and in the left return is a casement window. The barn has two doorways, and inside is a pair of upper crucks.
The Watson Scout Centre; 54.43198°N 1.21845°W		1717	A house, later used for other purposes, in sandstone, with a pantile roof, stone copings and kneelers. There are two storeys and an attic, and six bays. In the centre is a doorway that has a chamfered lintel with wavy tooling and a keystone. To its left is a blocked doorway and a double sash window, and the other windows have fixed lights with chamfered surrounds. Now operated as a residential scouting facility by North Yorkshire Scouts.
Ash Tree Farmhouse and outbuilding 54.42024°N 1.21792°W	—	Early 18th century	The farmhouse and outbuilding are in stone with some brick, and have pantile roofs with stone copings and kneelers. The house has a double plinth, two storeys, two bays and a small lean-to on the left, and the windows are casements. The ground floor openings have moulded architraves, and the windows in the upper floor have incompletely carved jambs. The house is attached to the outbuilding by a single-storey link. It has a single storey and three bays, and contains a stable door and two windows.
Holly Lodge; 54.43364°N 1.21976°W	—	Early 18th century	The house is in brick, the right end rendered, with a stepped cornice under swept eaves, and a pantile roof with stone copings and moulded kneelers. There are two storeys and three bays. In the centre is a gabled trellised porch, above it is a casement window, and the other windows are horizontally-sliding sashes, those in the ground floor with segmental relieving arches.
Manor Farmhouse and outbuilding 54.43103°N 1.21778°W	—	Early 18th century (probable)	The farmhouse and outbuilding are in sandstone, and have pantile roofs with stone copings and kneelers. The house has two storeys and four bays, to the left and lightly recessed is a single-storey outbuilding with four bays, and there is a single-bay extension further to the left. Two Tudor arched doorways have been converted into windows, the other windows in the house are horizontally-sliding sashes, and in the outbuilding is a mullioned window.
Manor House; 54.43311°N 1.21933°W	—	c. 1740–50	A large house in stone on a plinth, with quoins and pantile roofs with stone copings. The main block has two storeys and five bays, and single-storey quadrant links to lower two-storey three-bay pavilions with hipped roofs and battlements. Steps lead up to a central Tuscan porch, above which is a window with a Gibbs surround. The windows are segmental-headed sashes, those in the ground floor with triple keystones.
Alma Lodge and Manor Cottages; 54.43349°N 1.21950°W	—	Mid 18th century	A row of four cottages in stone on a plinth, with pantile roofs, stone copings and kneelers. There are two storeys and five bays. The doorways of two of the cottages have slightly chamfered lintels, most of the windows are 20th-century casements, and one cottage has horizontally-sliding sashes.
Beech Cottage, Beech House and Beech View; 54.43140°N 1.21801°W	—	Mid 18th century	A terrace of three houses in red brick on a stone plinth, with a stepped eaves cornice, sprocketed eaves, and a hipped pantile roof. There are two storeys, the middle house has three bays, and the outer houses have a single bay and an outshut. The doorways have plain surrounds, and the windows are horizontally-sliding sashes, those in the ground floor with wide segmental relieving arches.
Hall Farmhouse and outbuilding 54.43049°N 1.21493°W	—	18th century	The farmhouse and outbuilding are in stone, and have pantile roofs with stone copings and kneelers, and two storeys. The house has four bays, a single storey extension on the left, and a gabled rear wing with an outhouse in the angle. It contains a doorway with a lintel and a keystone, and horizontally-sliding sash windows, most with chamfered surrounds. To the right is a long single-storey outbuilding containing a doorway and small windows.
Rose Cottage and Primrose Cottage; 54.43038°N 1.21729°W	—	Mid 18th century	A house, later two cottages, in sandstone on a plinth, with a single-step cornice to swept eaves, and a pantile roof with stone copings and kneelers. There are two storeys and three bays. The paired central doorways have plain lintels, and the windows are horizontally-sliding sashes.
Walls, gates and gate piers, Manor House; 54.43318°N 1.21914°W	—	Late 18th century (probable)	The walls enclose the front garden, and retain the terraces in front of the house and in the garden. They are in stone with flat copings. Near the house is a pair of rusticated piers with pyramidal caps, and ornamental wrought iron gates and lamp standards.
The Old Vicarage; 54.43071°N 1.21591°W	—	Late 18th century	The house is in stone with quoins, and a pantile roof with stone copings and moulded kneelers. There are two storeys and five bays, the outer bays slightly recessed. In the centre is a doorway with a keystone, to its right is a caned bay window, in the right bay is a French window, and the other windows are sashes.
Carlton House; 54.43284°N 1.21806°W		Early 19th century	The house is stuccoed, and has a French tile roof with stone copings. There are three storeys and three bays. Steps with curved handrails lead up to a central doorway that has fluted half-columns, a patterned fanlight, a frieze with angle paterae, and a cornice. To the left is a single-storey bow window, and the other windows are sashes.
Carlton House Cottage; 54.43300°N 1.21814°W		Early 19th century	The cottage is in colourwashed sandstone, the left two bays rendered with quoins, and it has a pantile roof with a stone ridge, copings and kneelers. There are two storeys and six bays. The right bay contains a segmental-arched carriage entrance with voussoirs, and above it is a round window. The windows are casements, with a single light over the door, three lights in the ground floor, and the other upper floor windows have two lights and mullions.
The Elms; 54.43276°N 1.21799°W	—	Early 19th century	The house is stuccoed, and has a pantile roof with a tile ridge, and stone coping on the right. There are two storeys and 2½ bays. Steps with a wrought iron handrail lead up to a doorway with a fluted surround. Above it is a blank window, and the other windows are sashes.
Yard wall and gates 54.43284°N 1.21898°W	—	Early 19th century (probable)	The wall is in stone with flat coping, and is about 3.5 metres (11 ft) high. It contains a pedestrian entrance on the right, an elliptical carriage arch to the left, both with ornamental wrought iron gates. At the left end is a buttress.
St Botolph's Church; 54.43376°N 1.22034°W		1886	The church, designed by Temple Moore in Arts and Crafts style, is built in sandstone, the main roof is tiled, and on the aisles and porch are stone flags. It consists of a nave with a clerestory, north and south aisles, a south porch, a chancel, and a west tower embraced by the aisles. The tower has two stages, the lower stage tall, with a staircase on the northeast in a buttress-like projection, square-headed windows, a clock face, paired bell openings with cusped ogee heads, a cornice and an embattled parapet.
