= C. W. R. Knight =

English wildlife photographer and falconer (1884–1957)

C.W.R. Knight
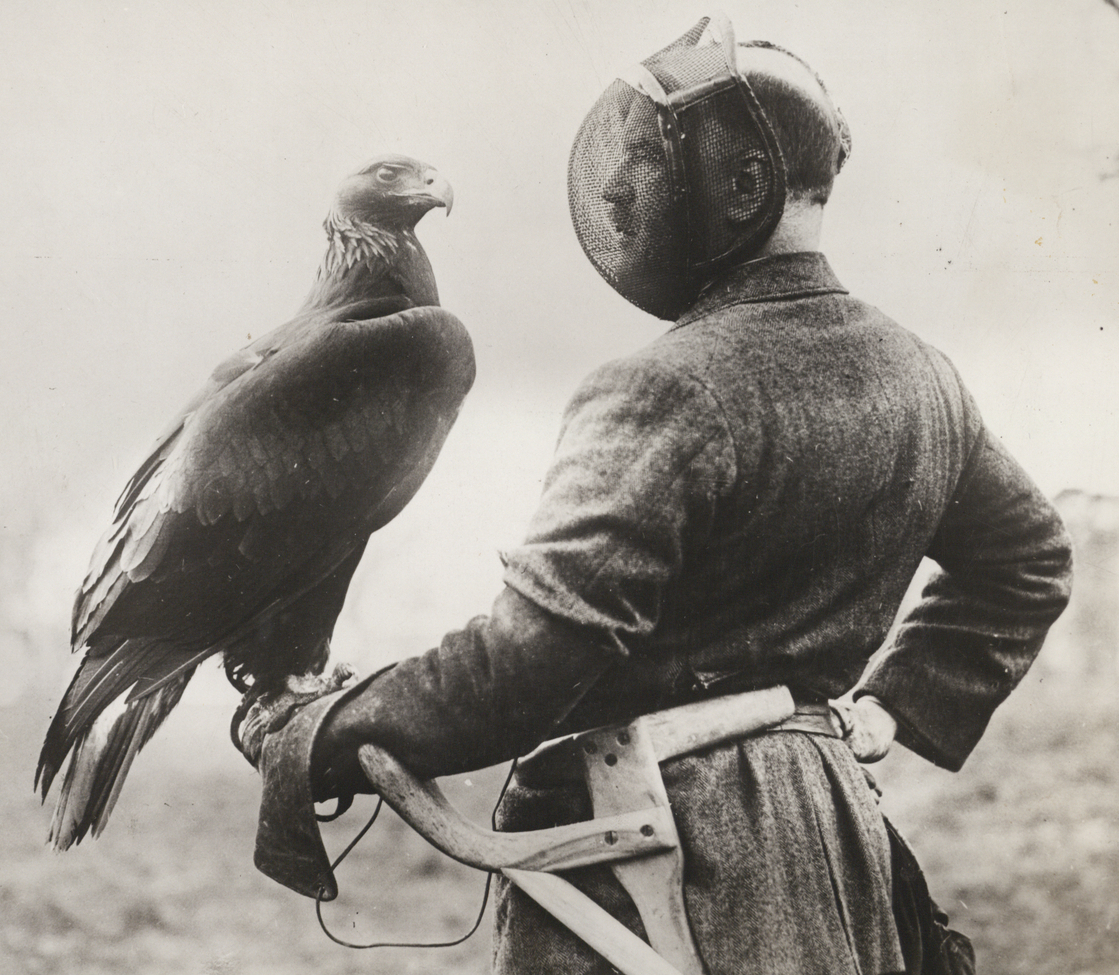
- Born: Charles William Robert Knight; 1884; Sevenoaks, Kent, England
- Died: 1957 (aged 72–73); Kenya
- Military career
- Allegiance: United Kingdom
- Branch: British Army
- Unit: Queen's Own Royal West Kent Regiment
- Commands: 1st Battalion, Honourable Artillery Company
- Conflicts: First World War

Charles William Robert Knight (1884–1957) M.C., F.R.P.S., F.Z.S. was a well-known British falconer. He promoted and wrote extensively on falconry throughout his life. He and his eagle, Mr Ramshaw, feature prominently in the 1945 film I Know Where I'm Going!

Knight was born at Sevenoaks, Kent, to Charles and Emily Knight; his brother, Frank, was the father of the actor Esmond Knight. Educated at Sevenoaks School, Knight joined the Queen's Own Royal West Kent Regiment on the outbreak of the First World War, serving as a sniper; he saw action at Ypres, Messines Ridge and the Somme, and was awarded the Military Cross. In 1917 he was promoted to captain in the 1st Battalion, Honourable Artillery Company, and went to the US in charge of a demonstration drill team. After the war, he worked in London as a tobacconist with his brother Frank, the Knight family business involving the importing of Havana cigars from Cuba. In 1924, he married Eva Olive Margaret Bennet; she died two years later.

Knight and Mr. Ramshaw made a joint appearance on the March 20, 1940 episode of the Fred Allen radio show, during which the eagle flew about the studio, nearly defecated on a studio audience member, and refused to return to Knight until the end of the show. Allen later described the appearance as "chaos... the audience screaming with laughter... The program went off the air on a note of sustained pandemonium."

Knight died in Kenya in 1957, and received an obituary in The Times.

== Selected publications ==
- Allen, Fred (1954). Treadmill To Oblivion. Boston, Little, Brown and Company (An Atlantic Monthly Press Book).
- Knight, C. W. R. (1946). Aristocrats of the air. London, Williams and Norgate.
- Knight, C. W. R. (1933). Mr. Ramshaw, my eagle. London, Arrowsmith.
- Knight, C. W. R. (1922). Wild life in the tree tops. 53 illus. from photographs taken by the author. New York, G.H. Doran.
