= Carlton in Cleveland =

Village in North Yorkshire, England

Coordinates: 54°25′55″N 1°13′04″W

Carlton in Cleveland: Carlton
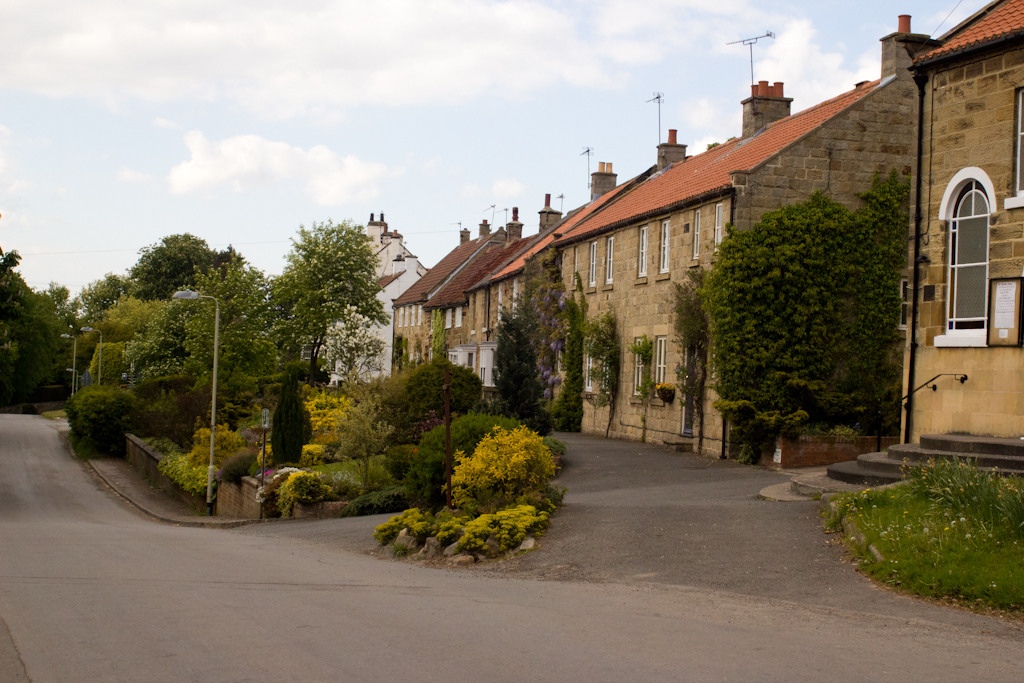
- A road in Carlton

- Location within North Yorkshire
- Population: 399 (2011 Census)
- OS grid reference: NZ508043
  - London: 210 mi (340 km) SSE
- Civil parish: Carlton
- Unitary authority: North Yorkshire
- Ceremonial county: North Yorkshire
- Region: Yorkshire and the Humber
- Country: England
- Sovereign state: United Kingdom
- Post town: MIDDLESBROUGH
- Postcode district: TS9
- Police: North Yorkshire
- Fire: North Yorkshire
- Ambulance: Yorkshire
- Website: Parish Council website

Carlton in Cleveland is a village in the county of North Yorkshire, England, and on the edge of the North York Moors National Park. It is situated approximately 9 miles (14 km) south of Middlesbrough. The village is commonly known as Carlton, and is the only village in the civil parish of Carlton.

The population of the parish at the 2011 Census was recorded at 399 and was estimated at 300 in 2013.

From 1974 to 2023 it was part of the Hambleton District, it is now administered by the unitary North Yorkshire Council.

The village has a school, Carlton and Faceby Primary School, and a public house, the Blackwell Ox, but no longer has a post office or shop. Carlton Outdoor Education Centre within the village provides activities for children.

== History ==
The name Carlton derives from the Old Norse karl meaning free peasant and the Old English tūn meaning 'settlement'.

Carlton was first mentioned in the Domesday Book in 1086. By the 14th century it had become known as Karleton in Clyveland (Carlton in Cleveland), to distinguish the place from other places named Carlton. "Cleveland" refers to the historic region of Cleveland. The village was in the Hambleton district until 2023 and never formed part of the county of Cleveland, which existed from 1974 to 1996.

In the Middle Ages, it appears that Carlton was a chapelry in the parish of Rudby, but by 1611 Carlton had its own church, and was considered a separate parish. The present St Botolph's Church, Carlton in Cleveland, was completed in 1897. It was designed by Temple Moore, and is a Grade II listed building.

The Cleveland Hills, which lie to the south of the village, are known colloquially as 'Carlton Banks'. They were the site of alum extraction and a small works. During the 1950s the abandoned workings became a small but popular Motorcycling Scramble track. Adjacent to it is the Lordstones Country Park.

On 10 August 2003, a thunderstorm dropped 1.9 inches (49 mm) of rain on the village in less than 13 minutes. The recording is held by the Met Office to be the most accurate rainfall measurement in the British Isles. The accuracy is maintained because the Meteorological Office have a monitoring station in the village. In May 2024, a month's worth of rain fell around the village in 12 hours causing a mudslide, which killed one child.

== Notable people ==
- Barry Dodd, entrepreneur and Lord Lieutenant of North Yorkshire, lived at Busby Hall briefly in 2018

== See also ==
- Listed buildings in Carlton in Cleveland
