= Cuore di mamma =

1969 film

- Directed by: Salvatore Samperi
- Cinematography: Aldo Scavarda
- Edited by: Roberto Perpignani
- Music by: Ennio Morricone
- Release date: February 8, 1969
- Language: Italian

Cuore di mamma (also known as Mother's Heart) is a 1969 Italian comedy drama film directed by Salvatore Samperi.

== Cast ==
- Philippe Leroy: Andrea Franti
- Beba Loncar: Magda Franti
- Carla Gravina: Lorenza Garroni
- Yorgo Voyagis: Carlo
- Paolo Graziosi: Mariano
- Rina Franchetti: Berta
- Nicoletta Rizzi: Eleonora

== Production ==
The character played by Carla Gravina has three children played by Mauro Gravina, Monica Gravina and Massimiliano Ferendeles. In real life Mauro and Monica are siblings, but they are not Carla Gravina's relatives.
