= The Sins of Rachel Cade =

1961 film by Gordon Douglas

- Theatrical release poster
- Directed by: Gordon Douglas
- Written by: Edward Anhalt
- Based on: Rachel Cade; 1956 novel by Charles Mercer
- Produced by: Henry Blanke
- Starring: Angie Dickinson; Peter Finch; Roger Moore
- Cinematography: J. Peverell Marley
- Edited by: Owen Marks
- Music by: Max Steiner
- Distributed by: Warner Bros. Pictures
- Release date: April 2, 1961
- Running time: 124 minutes
- Country: United States
- Language: English

The Sins of Rachel Cade is a 1961 American drama film directed by Gordon Douglas and starring Angie Dickinson in the title role, as well as Peter Finch and Roger Moore who compete for her love.

== Plot ==
During World War II, Protestant medical missionary Rachel comes to the village of Dibela in the Belgian Congo. Widowed military administrator Colonel Derode is initially skeptical about her work, but eventually is romantically attracted to Rachel. One of her patients is Paul Wilton, an American doctor with the Royal Air Force (RAF). She makes love with Paul the night before he is to leave, and becomes pregnant.

== Cast ==
- Angie Dickinson as Rachel Cade
- Peter Finch as Colonel Henry Derode
- Roger Moore as Paul Wilton
- Errol John as Kulu
- Woody Strode as Muwango
- Juano Hernández as Kalanumu
- Frederick O'Neal as Buderga
- Mary Wickes as Marie Grieux
- Scatman Crothers as Musinga
- Rafer Johnson as Kosongo
- Charles Wood as Mzimba
- Douglas Spencer as Doctor Bikel

== Background ==
The film is loosely based on the 1956 novel by Charles Mercer, Rachel Cade, published by G. P. Putnam's Sons.

Film rights were bought prior to publication by William Dozier who was head of production at RKO Pictures. In September 1956 he announced that Stanley Rubin would produce and the film would be made in Africa with John Wayne. It would be part of a five-picture slate from Rubin worth $12 million starting with The Girl Most Likely. Katharine Hepburn was announced as a possible star. Then Dozier offered the lead to Deborah Kerr. Stirling Silliphant signed to write the script. In October Dozier said the film would be one of fifteen RKO would make the following year, others including Stage Struck, Bangkok, Ten Days in August, Three Empty Rooms, Affair in Portifino, Sex and Miss McAdoo, Pakistan, Galveston, On My Honor, The Naked and the Dead, Cash MCad, Far Alert, Journey to the Center of the Earth and Curtain Going Up.

RKO wound up as a company – most of the fifteen films listed were not made. Film rights went to Warner Bros. Pictures who in November 1958 announced they would make the film. In March 1959 Edward Anhalt was assigned to write the script and Henry Blanke was to produce. Blanke had also produced The Nun's Story (1959), starring Audrey Hepburn. The Sins of Rachel Cade had some familiarities to that story particularly with the lead character: a religious female working to help during wartime. Also, Peter Finch plays an atheistic authority figure in both films.

In June Warners announced that Carroll Baker would star and Gordon Douglas would direct. Peter Finch was announced as the male star. However Baker refused to make the movie and Warners gave the lead to Angie Dickinson, who had just made Rio Bravo and The Bramble Bush for the studio.

In August Peter Finch arrived in Hollywood for filming, which began August 27. He called his role "a good, rather cynical part with some excellent dialogue." Rafer Johnson signed in September. Roger Moore's casting was announced in October – he was then making The Alaskans for Warner Bros.
