= List of landslips in Yorkshire =

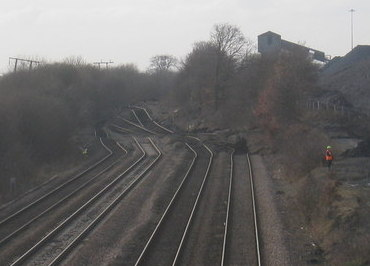
Landslip at Hatfield Colliery

This is a list of landslips in Yorkshire, England. It covers land and mudslips that have occurred within the traditional county of Yorkshire. Most of the entries below relate to older landslips, but the British Geological Survey still considers some valleys in Yorkshire to contain active landslips. The term landslip is more common in Britain than elsewhere (including on the railways, which describe all slides as landslips), whereas landslide is more widely used outside Britain.

== Background ==
Landslips occur all over the world wherever there are hills or mountains, and the landslips themselves can have several different origins, but in Yorkshire, they are not usually caused by tectonic activity. However, glacial activity, and natural processes have left the Yorkshire Dales with several scars within its valleys which were caused by landslips. Most landslips in Yorkshire are the result of water, either by saturation, groundwater changes, ingress of water into a slope, or by activity undertaken by humans that causes the event. Between the years 1981 and 2000, no-one died as a result of a landslide in Britain, but several have occurred during that time. However, a mudslide at Carlton in Cleveland in 2024 recorded the death of one person. Whilst most landslips listed below are older ones, the British Geological Survey still consider some slopes in Yorkshire to be active.

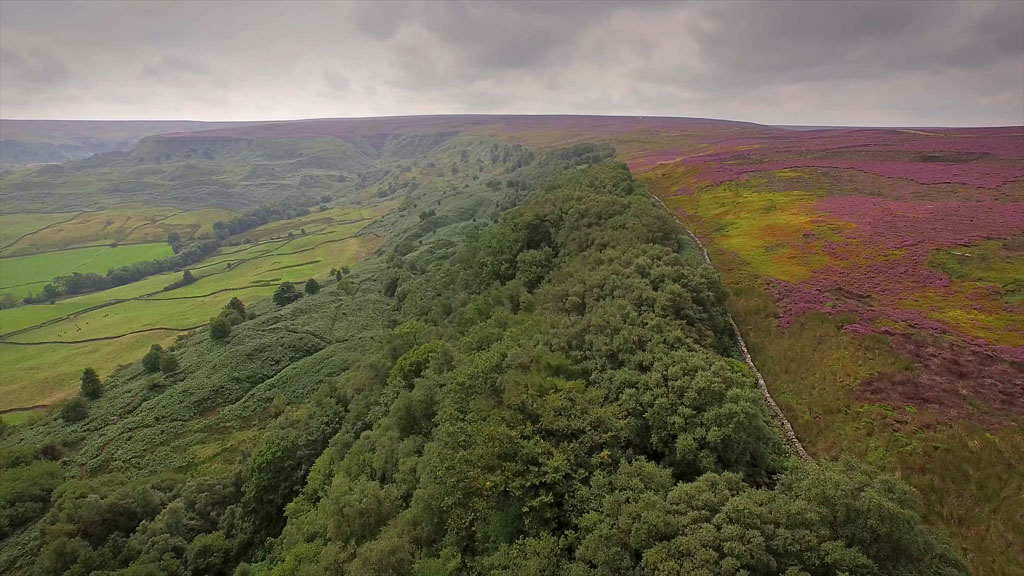
Landslips along the edge of Fryup Dale

A large portion of the landslips in Yorkshire have occurred at the coast, with Holderness having the fastest eroding coastline in Europe (see Coastal erosion in Yorkshire). Calculations have shown that since 1786, the coastline at Aldbrough loses over 4,000,000 cubic metres (140,000,000 cu ft) of material from the cliffs and shoreface each year. Other instances of landslips, such as at Kettleness, came about because of quarrying of alum on the coast, and several landslips in Robin Hood's Bay led to a sea wall being constructed to protect the village. Two types of geological formations (Redcar Mudstone and Whitby Mudstone) are prone to landslips. The mudstones contain a high volume of clay, which when overlaying harder strata below, causes movement in the mudstone formation when saturated. The Whitby Mudstone is recognised as having one of the highest density of landslips in the United Kingdom, with 42 landslips per 100 square kilometres (39 sq mi). Relict landslips (landslips which have occurred some time ago in geological terms, but which are no longer prone to slipping) on the western edge of Fryup Dale have left permanent scarring along the valley.

The slip at Hatfield Colliery was due to waste from the colliery process when coal was washed. The high moisture content enabled the slurry to burst out of its confines and the slip displaced the railway. Other inland slides are usually due to saturated mud, and in the case of the ones at Kex Gill, have shut the A59 road numerous times throughout the 21st century.

Rockfalls at the coast are common, with some such as one in 2018 causing the death of a child who was playing on the beach. Geologists believe the rockfalls could actually be due to dryer weather rather than water ingress.

== List ==
Name	Date	Details	Refs.
Whitby	1787	A landslide on the East Cliff destroyed many of the houses on a road named Haggerlythe and a gun battery fell into the sea. Other landslides were recorded in 1870 and 1932.	
Crow Hill bog burst	2 September 1824	During a violent thunderstorm, some 1,200 cubic yards (920 m^{3}) of bog material, was sent down the valley through Ponden, Stanbury and on through the Worth Valley. The pollutive effects of the bog material affected businesses as far down the River Aire as Leeds.	
Kettleness	17 December 1829	Due to the alum workings on the coast at Kettleness, the cliffs had become unstable because of the removal of the shales used in alum production. The whole village and alum works sipped into the sea, with all the local inhabitants taking shelter on a boat moored off the shore which had arrived to collect finished alum.	
Fewston	1880	Land in the village began to slide downhill in 1880. One local measured the slippage at 0.5 inches (13 mm) per day, and this led to a depopulation of the village. Initially, it was blamed on the building of Fewston Reservoir, but a geologist refuted this, and stated it was down to the shale strata underneath the village, being bloated from excessive rainfall over three years.	
Robin Hood's Bay	Various occurrences	In 1893 some houses fell into the sea from the top of the 70 feet (21 m) cliff.	
Dent Head landslip (Note: Dent is now in Cumbria, but in 1935, it was in the West Riding of Yorkshire.)	February 1935	An aqueduct over the Settle–Carlisle line burst and flooded the earth around a cutting. This caused a landslip of over 500 tonnes (550 tons) to spill into the cutting. No trains were passing at the time, so no injuries or deaths occurred.	
Holbeck Hall	June 1993	The gardens of the hotel overlooking the sea extended for 70 metres (230 ft) to the shoreline, but on the morning of 3 June 1993, 55 metres (180 ft) had slid down the slope and onto the beach. The hotel soon collapsed, and the whole premises were later demolished. The cause of the landslip was not down to the sea, but the porosity of the land underneath the hotel and the amount of rain in the preceding months (140 millimetres (5.5 in)).	
Heck	2000	1.5 miles (2.4 km) of the East Coast Main Line near Heck was damaged by a landslip. Over 200,000 tonnes (200,000 long tons; 220,000 short tons) was needed to repair the stretch of railway.	
Hatfield landslip	February 2013	Saturated coal shale pushed the railway line between Hatfield and Stainforth railway station and Thorne South railway station. The line re-opened five months later.	
Kex Gill (A59 road)	Various occurrences	Since the year 2000, the A59 has been closed 15 times due to landslips at the Kex Gill section. A bypass is being constructed, and is hoped to be open by 2026.	
Ripon	Various occurrences	Larges swathes of Ripon are built on gypsum, which aquifers cut into and create cavities, opening up sinkholes around the city. These have caused landslips with many domestic properties having to be evacuated and at least one was demolished. Ripon can expect to suffer a sinkhole every three to five years.	
Whitby	December 2012	A landslip on the East Cliff underneath the churchyard. Five houses on Aelfleda Terrace had to be demolished after heavy rain and flooding underneath the houses washed the bank away.	
Carlton in Cleveland mudslide	May 2024	A month's worth of rain fell on the area in 12 hours. A child was killed in the mudslide.	
