= Gabriella Giacobbe =

Italian actress

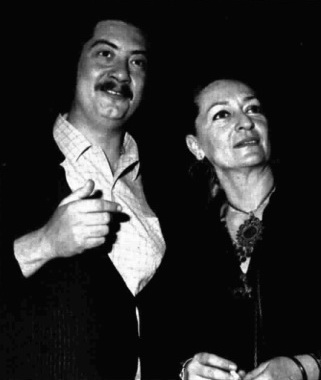
Gabriella Giacobbe with actor Mario Valgoi at the rehearsal of a radio drama (1972)

Gabriella Giacobbe (1923 – 5 January 1979) was an Italian stage, film and television actress.

== Career ==
Born in L'Aquila, Italy, Giacobbe graduated at the drama school of Giorgio Strehler and worked long with his company at the Piccolo Teatro, debuting in 1953 with the drama La sei giorni. Her stage credits include works directed by Luchino Visconti and Eduardo De Filippo. She also had a prolific career in television, appearing in successful series and TV movies such as A come Andromeda and La donna di picche. More sporadic were her film appearances, which nonetheless included works by Luigi Magni, Dino Risi, Nelo Risi. She died of cancer on 8 January 1979, at the age of 55.

== Filmography ==
Year	Title	Role	Notes
1971	Una stagione all'inferno		
1973	Anna, quel particolare piacere	Nun	
1975	Una sera c'incontrammo	Mother of Minnie	
1976	Keoma	The Witch	
1977	The Bishop's Bedroom	Cleofe - wife of Orimbelli	
1977	In the Name of the Pope King	Maria Tognetti	
1977	Interno di un convento	Abbess Flavia Orsini	
1978	Scherzi da prete		
