= Captain Zep – Space Detective =

British TV children's series (1983–1984)

- Genre: Children's, science fiction, mystery
- Starring: Ben Ellison; Paul Greenwood; Richard Morant; Harriet Keevil
- Country of origin: United Kingdom
- Original language: English
- No. of seasons: 2
- No. of episodes: 12

Production
- Running time: 30 minutes

Original release
- Network: BBC
- Release: 5 January 1983 – 13 April 1984

Captain Zep – Space Detective is a British television children's series produced by the BBC between 1983 and 1984.

Constructed as part drama and part quiz game, Captain Zep featured mysteries that would be solved by the child audience in the studio, along with a write-in competition for viewers. The child audience were dressed in futuristic clothes and had gelled hair. The series was also notable for its combination of live action and animation, where the cast would interact with drawn alien characters amidst drawn backgrounds.

Paul Greenwood played the titular Captain Zep in the first series, to be replaced by Richard Morant for series two. Zep was assisted by Professor Spiro (Harriet Keevil) who was also replaced in series two by Professor Vana (Tracey Childs). The only cast member to appear in both series was Ben Ellison as Jason Brown.

The theme tune "Captain Zep" was written by David Owen Smith and Paul Aitken and performed by The Spacewalkers.
