= Anna, quel particolare piacere =

- Directed by: Giuliano Carnimeo
- Written by: Sauro Scavolini; Francesco Milizia; Ernesto Gastaldi
- Produced by: Luciano Martino
- Starring: Edwige Fenech; Corrado Pani; Richard Conte; John Richardson
- Cinematography: Marcello Masciocchi
- Edited by: Eugenio Alabiso
- Music by: Luciano Michelini
- Release date: 27 November 1972
- Country: Italy
- Language: Italian

Anna, quel particolare piacere (internationally released as Anna: the Pleasure, the Torment and Secrets of a Call Girl) is a 1972 Italian crime-drama film directed by Giuliano Carnimeo. It was referred as a film with a good cinematography and actors appropriate to their roles but unbalanced between its parts.

== Plot ==
The young and beautiful Anna is linked to Guido, a drug trafficker embroiled in shady turns of Milan in the seventies. While pregnant, the woman refuses to have an abortion and gives birth to Paolo, a sick child in need of continuous care. During one of Guido's many detentions, Anna meets Lorenzo, a world-famous Milanese surgeon: the man saves Paolo's life with a delicate operation. Released from prison, Guido tries to hinder in every way the romantic relationship born in the meantime between Lorenzo and Anna. The woman, exasperated by Guido's constant ambushes, reacts by shooting the man who, before dying, manages to wound her. Emergency surgery by Lorenzo, Anna loses her life, and Lorenzo decides to adopt Paolo.

== Cast ==
- Edwige Fenech: Anna
- Richard Conte: Soriani
- John Richardson: Lorenzo
- Corrado Pani: Guido
- Corrado Gaipa: Doctor
- Bruno Corazzari: Albino
- Nino Casale:accomplice of Soriani
- Laura Bonaparte: Loredana
- Shirley Corrigan: Lise
- Ennio Balbo: Frossi
- Paolo Lena:Paul
- Carla Calò: mom of Anna
- Gabriella Giacobbe: Nun
- Umberto Raho: lawyer of Sogliani
- Wilma Casagrande: Susy
- Ettore Manni: Zuco
- Antonio Casale: Sogliani's henchman

== See also ==
- List of Italian films of 1972
