= Paul Greenwood =

British actor (born 1943)

- Born: 2 August 1943 (age 82); Stockton-on-Tees, County Durham, England
- Occupation: Actor
- Years active: 1968–present
- Spouse: Diane Keen (1969–1979)

Paul Greenwood (born 2 August 1943) is a British film, television and theatre actor. He is best known for his role as PC Michael "Rosie" Penrose in the sitcom The Growing Pains of PC Penrose and its successor Rosie, and as Inspector Yelland in Spender.

== Career ==
He has appeared in over twenty-five television productions and also in several films; he has also appeared in theatrical productions including the musical Chitty Chitty Bang Bang and the musical The Wizard of Oz. In 1973, he was a guest on each edition of the 10-part BBC1 variety series It's Lulu.

Greenwood is well known for appearing as PC Michael "Rosie" Penrose in all twenty-seven episodes (1977–1981) of TV comedy series Rosie. His film roles include Sex and the Other Woman (1972), the Hammer horror Captain Kronos - Vampire Hunter (1973), TV comedy spinoff The Lovers! (1973), and Pete Walker's horror Frightmare (1974).

His other television roles include the title role in Captain Zep – Space Detective (1983), a children's series; and Mr. Lucas in three episodes (1985–1987) of the comedy The Secret Diary Of Adrian Mole Aged 13¾ and one episode of Our Friends In The North (1996). In December 2019, he appeared in an episode of the BBC One soap opera Doctors as Charles Webster.
