= Rainbow City (TV series) =

1967 British TV drama series

- Genre: Legal drama
- Created by: John Elliot
- Starring: Errol John; Horace James; Gemma Jones
- Country of origin: United Kingdom
- Original language: English
- No. of series: 1
- No. of episodes: 6

Production
- Producers: John Elliot; Alan Rees
- Running time: 25 minutes

Original release
- Network: BBC1
- Release: 1 July – 9 August 1967

Rainbow City is a British television series made by the BBC and shown in 1967. It was created and produced by John Elliot.

The series was the first British TV series to feature a black actor, Errol John as the lead character. John starred as John Steele, a black solicitor, and the series dealt with his personal and professional problems, living and working in a multi-ethnic part of Birmingham. John Elliot had been approached by the head of programmes for BBC Birmingham to develop a series about the Caribbean community in Great Britain. Elliot wrote several episodes in collaboration with Trinidadian actor, Horace James, who was cast in one of the other main roles. The series was shot at the BBC's Gosta Green studio in Birmingham. Five of the six episodes survived.

Mary, Steele's white wife, was played by Gemma Jones, later the star of the BBC's The Duchess of Duke Street.
