= Kex Gill Bypass =

Future road in North Yorkshire, England

Coordinates: 53.9936°N 1.7813°W

Kex Gill Bypass
- Location: Blubberhouses
- Length: 4.8 km (3.0 mi)
- Existed: 25 August 2026–present

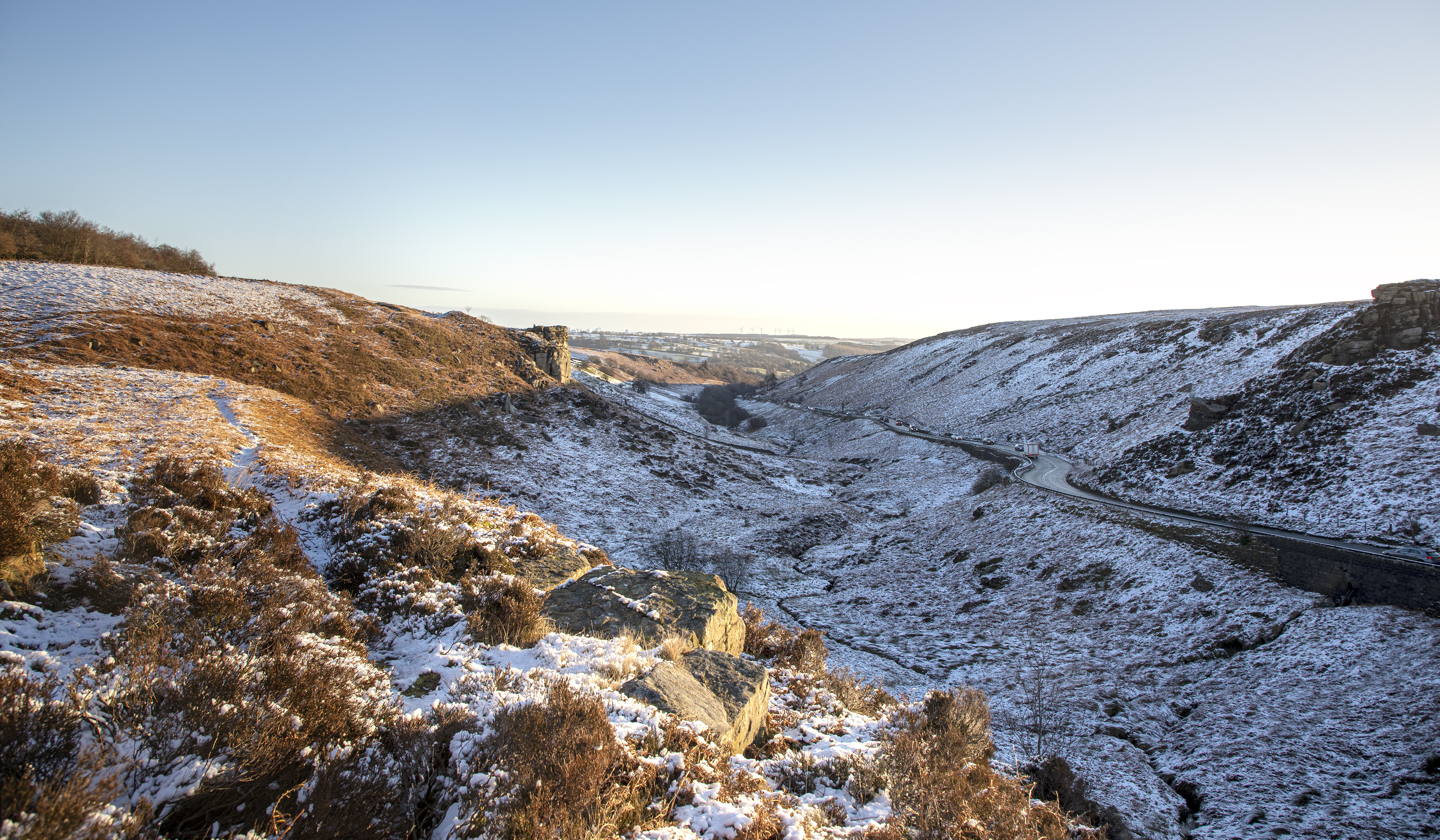
Kex Gill and Dovestone; the new bypass will be just to the left of the image

The Kex Gill Bypass is a future stretch of A-road across Kex Gill Moor to Blubberhouses in North Yorkshire, England. The route is part of the A59 road across the Pennines between Preston and York, with the Kex Gill Bypass being located within the Nidderdale Area of Outstanding Natural Beauty. The bypass is required as the 1820s built bypass is prone to landslips and road cracking, which accounted for eight weeks of closure in 2016. It is expected to be 4.8 kilometres (3 mi) long and was to be opened in spring 2026. This was subsequently revised, and the road opened to traffic on 25 August 2026.

== History ==
The original road past Blubberhouses and over Kex Moor went slightly further north than the current route known as Kex Gill. This road is now called Hall Lane at Blubberhouses (SE160555) and becomes a dirt track on the northern side of the valley carrying Hall Beck. (Note: Hall Beck flows eastwards from Kex Gill Moor towards the River Washburn at Blubberhouses. Kex Beck, flows westwards from the watershed of Kex Gill Moor and flows into the River Wharfe. The original road over Kex Gill Moor was known as Kex Gill Road, which lends its name to the current section of A59 road between Kex Gill Moor and Blubberhouses. The section eastwards, consisting of the small valley drained by Hall Beck is known as Kex Gill. Historically, the whole area was in the ancient parish of Fewston, and Hall Beck was referred to as the lower part of Kex Gill.) This road was developed as a turnpike between 1770 and 1778 (The Skipton and Knaresborough Turnpike), but between 1823 and 1827, the new cut from Blubberhouses to Kex Gill Moor (the present A59) was built, which despite the name of the adjacent stream, became known as Kex Gill (or Kex Ghyll). The underlying geology is Kinderscout Grit, which has formed into several outcrops on the northern side of Kex Gill, including one called The Dovestone. It is thought that parts of the Craven faults in the area, dislodged the strata and allowed water to carve a "rocky gorge". The drop from the edge of the road to the stream at the bottom of the gorge is 20 feet (6.1 m). The road became well-known when it was re-christened Cote de Blubberhouses in the 2014 Grand Depart Tour de France held in Yorkshire.

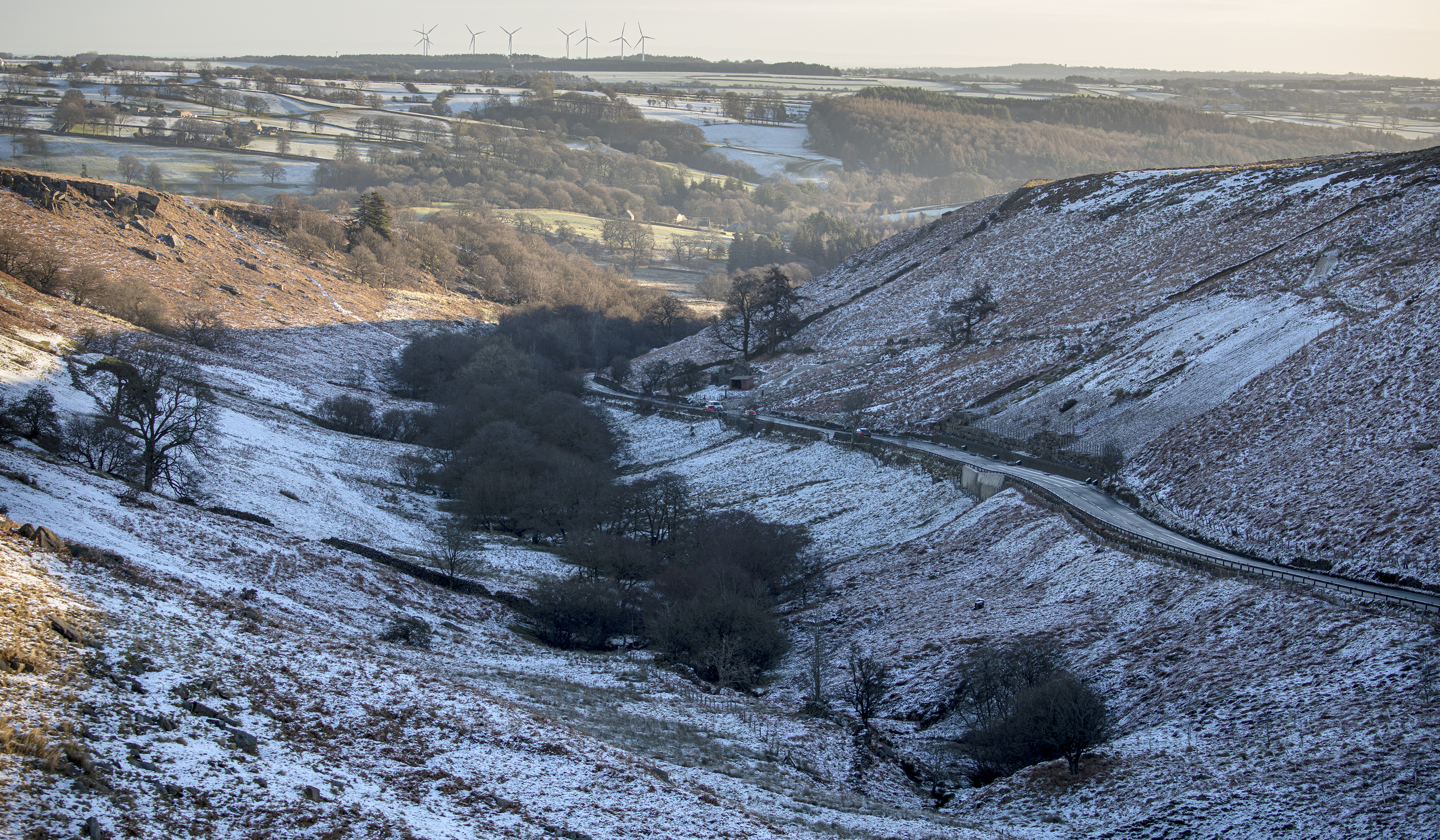
Kex Gill showing reinforced section

The road has suffered from many landslips and cracks as the southern edge of the small valley pushes down upon it. It was estimated that between 2008 and 2017, North Yorkshire County Council (NYCC) spent £1.6 million on remediating landslips and cracks. During the 2007 floods, the road was closed for a week after a landslip trapped a couple in the car. The landslip dislodged 100 tonnes (110 tons) of earth which slid down the embankment. In 2014, over £200,000 was spent on remedial works when heavy rain caused a landslip. In 2016, the road was closed for eight weeks to allow remedial work to be undertaken on the road which had moved 31 inches (790 mm) due to heavy rain over the preceding Christmas period. The road was further restricted for nearly a year from May 2018, and further closures, right up until the start of 2025, meant that the road has been closed for significant periods 13 times between 2002 and 2025.

The proposed bypass was subject to extra planning due to it being located within the Nidderdale Area of Outstanding Natural Beauty (AONB). In January 2022, North Yorkshire County Council announced its intention to proceed with the project as soon as possible. NYCC acknowledged that delays had been incurred by the "statutory processes" it needed to fulfil before the bypass could get underway. The project was costed at £60 million in January 2021; with £56 million from the Department for Transport (DfT) and the rest from NYCC. The proposed route would leave the existing A59 where the road to West End accesses the A59 at Ravens Peak (909 feet (277 m)) at SE135551. It would head north east between the road to West End and the former Blubberhouses Quarry processing site, accessing the original 1778 turnpike on Kex Moor at SE144556. The new road would not use Hall Lane, but turn south before that joining the existing A59 at SE160552. A revised junction at Church Hill (adjacent to Fewston Reservoir), is also part of the scheme to improve safety at that location.

In August 2022, the County Council provided another £7.2 million towards the scheme, with a new projected completion date in November 2025. North Yorkshire County Council deputy leader, Gareth Dadd, stated: "I wouldn't say I'm pleased to be having to recommend a further £7.2m for the Kex Gill project. But nonetheless it shows our commitment to major road improvement." Clearance of the moorland along the route of the new road is expected to start in December 2022, to avoid the nesting season in the following spring. Further delays and problems with poor ground conditions that had been unforeseen, resulted in North Yorkshire Council awarding the scheme a further £11.7 million in May 2025, meaning the expected final cost will be £82.5 million.

The road was opened for vehicular traffic on 25 August 2026, though initially with a 30-mile-per-hour (48 km/h) speed limit whilst ancillary works are completed.

== See also ==
- List of landslips in Yorkshire
