= The Andromeda Breakthrough =

1962 British TV science fiction drama serial

- Opening titles
- Genre: Science fiction serial
- Directed by: John Elliot (Eps 1,3,5); John Knight (Eps 2,4,6)
- Starring: Peter Halliday; Susan Hampshire; John Hollis; Mary Morris
- Country of origin: United Kingdom
- No. of episodes: 6

Production
- Producer: John Elliot
- Running time: 6x45 Minutes

Original release
- Network: BBC TV
- Release: 28 June – 2 August 1962

Related
- A for Andromeda

The Andromeda Breakthrough is a 1962 sequel to the popular BBC TV science fiction serial A for Andromeda, again written by Fred Hoyle and John Elliot.

== Plot summary ==
Kidnapped by Intel representative Kaufman (John Hollis), John Fleming (Peter Halliday) along with Professor Madeleine Dawnay (Mary Morris) and Andromeda, the artificially constructed female humanoid (Susan Hampshire), are brought to Azaran, a small Middle Eastern country.

Upon arrival, the group find a duplicate of the machine Fleming designed has been built by Intel. After many dangers, Fleming finds both the reason for the original message having been sent and the means to bring the machine under human control.

Things take a deadly turn when Fleming discovers the politically unstable leader's hope to make use of his and Dawnay's skills and Andromeda's otherworldly abilities...

One of the final points of the story was the nature of the alien making the signals. The alien was eventually revealed to be a creature or intelligence that was shown as static machine or habitat and fed by pipes on its planet.

== Casting ==
The title star of the previous serial, Julie Christie, was unavailable. She was recast with Susan Hampshire as Andromeda, who survived her fall into the cavern pool.

== Availability ==
The complete TV serial survives in the BBC archives and was released, alongside the surviving episode plus material from A for Andromeda and various extra features, as part of The Andromeda Anthology DVD set in 2006.

== Novelisation ==
Hoyle and Elliot's novelisation was published by Harper and Row in 1964, as Andromeda Breakthrough by arrangement with the BBC, and paperback editions followed from Fawcett World Library (1965) in USA and Corgi (1966) in Britain. Judith Merril reported that although the novelisation suffered from "routine writing, stereotyped characters, and an apparent belief in the Ian Fleming school of international intrigue," the scientists-protagonists were "anything but stereotyped," and "a fair cross-section of the kinds of people who are attracted to scientific work." Merril concluded that the clichéd elements "provide a reasonably amusing background to a genuinely intriguing scientific puzzle."

A major theme of the novel is that the essence of life is information of a type that can be transmitted by radio signal over galactic distances. Hoyle and Elliot published this novel in 1964 and its predecessor “A for Andromeda” in 1962 at a time when the fundamental importance of the biological information encoded in DNA was in the early stages of becoming understood. The biochemist in the novel, Professor Dawnay, had been able to create an initial, but malignant, bacterial life form when "she began a D.N.A. synthesis" using information transmitted from the Andromeda Galaxy. In Chapter 10, to counteract the initial destructive bacterial form, Dawnay carries out synthesis of another "D.N.A. helix" based bacterium which is able to eliminate the former one, thus saving mankind. In the real world of today, whole genomes can actually be built from chemically synthesized DNA sequences, and when inserted into a receptive cellular environment can be brought to life to create a novel organism (see for example Hutchinson et al.). Thus the fictional syntheses of life forms described in the novel are similar to what, today, can actually be realized.

A combined re-issue of the novel with the novelization of A for Andromeda was published by the Orion Publishing Group in 2020 under the title The Andromeda Anthology, as part of the SF Masterworks range. A new introduction was provided by Kim Newman. This edition has also been made into an audiobook, performed by Billie Fulford-Brown.
