= Charles E. Mercer =

Canadian-American author, editor and journalist

Charles E. Mercer (born in Stouffville, Ontario on July 12, 1917 - died December 28, 1988, in Edison, New Jersey) was a Canadian-American author, editor and journalist.

Mercer was the son of Baptist minister Alfred Mercer. After earning a Bachelor of Arts from Brown University in 1939, Mercer worked as a reporter for The Washington Post and later served under US Army Intelligence during World War II and the Korean War, eventually achieving the rank of First Lieutenant.

Mercer worked as a television columnist for Associated Press from 1946 to 1959. In 1956, he published the novel Rachel Cade, which was translated into fourteen languages and sold over three million copies. The book was later adapted into the film The Sins of Rachel Cade (1961), starring Angie Dickinson. Mercer published several other novels during the 1960s and 1970s.

Mercer also had a long career in publishing, beginning as a senior editor at G. P. Putnam's Sons in New York City in 1966, and serving as the Vice President of the publishing house from 1975 until his retirement in 1979.

Mercer died in Edison, New Jersey on December 28, 1988, at the age of 71.

== Bibliography ==
- Rachel Cade (1956)
- The Drummond Traditions (1957)
- Enough Good Men (1960)
- The Reckoning (1963)
- The Trespassers (1964)
- Beyond Bojador (1965)
- Promise Morning (1966)
- The Morning (1969)
