= A come Andromeda =

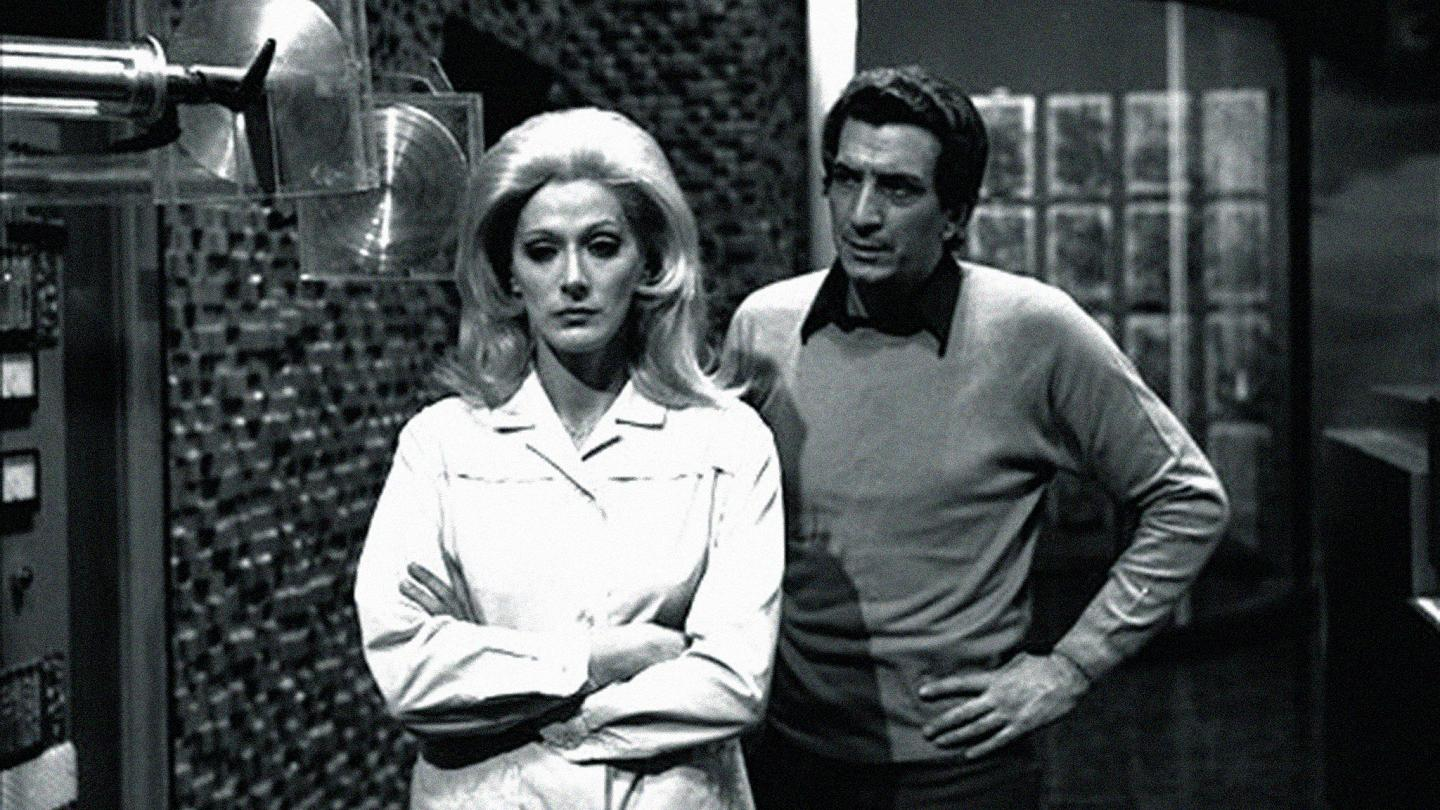
Nicoletta Rizzi and Luigi Vannucchi in a film still on the set of A come Andromeda

A come Andromeda (RAI, 1971) is an Italian television remake of A for Andromeda (1961), the BBC series based on the book of the same name written by cosmologist Fred Hoyle in conjunction with author and television producer John Elliot.

== Cast ==
- Luigi Vannucchi: John Fleming
- Mario Piave: Dennis Bridger
- Tino Carraro: Professor Ernest Reinhart
- Paola Pitagora: Judy Adamson
- Ida Meda: Liz Murray
- Arturo Dominici: Undersecretary for Science Osborne
- Claudio Cassinelli: Harries
- Domenico Perna Di Monteleone: Whelan
- Gabriella Giacobbe: Madeleine Dawnay
- Nicoletta Rizzi: Christine/Andromeda
- Sandro Tuminelli: Barnett, of Intel
- Franco Volpi: General Watling
- Enzo Tarascio: Colonel Geers
- Giampiero Albertini: General Vandenberg
- Edoardo Toniolo: Minister Charles Robert Ratcliff
- Guido De Salvi: Major Quadring
- Gualtiero Isnenghi: Dr. Hunter
- Raffaele Bondini: Egon
- Guido Alberti: Prime Minister
- Inisero Cremaschi: Jas. Olboyd
- Dino Feretti: Alex

== Production ==
The remake was still set in Britain ("in the following year") but filmed at Italian locations, and consists of five episodes of about one hour each. It was adapted by Inisero Cremaschi (who also appeared in a small role) and directed by Vittorio Cottafavi. Music was by Mario Migliardi. The cast includes Paola Pitagora as Judy Adamson, Luigi Vannucchi as Fleming, and Tino Carraro as Reinhart. Nicoletta Rizzi appeared as Andromeda, the person created by the supercomputer, replacing the singer Patty Pravo, who was originally cast in the role, but who did not fulfil her commitments, necessitating re-shooting of several scenes.

== Broadcast ==
This version still exists and has been repeated on Italian television. It has been released on VHS, and latterly on DVD but without English subtitles. It is considered the first science fiction television-series produced by the Italian television.
