= Herbert Stanley Morris =

- Born: 1892; Melbourne, Australia
- Died: 14 August 1919 (aged 26–27); England
- Education: University Cape Town
- Scientific career
- Fields: Botany

Herbert Stanley Morris (1892 – 14 August 1919) was a botanist who served as District Commissioner on the island of Fiji and A.D.C. to the Governor of Fiji, Sir Ernest Bickham Sweet-Escott. He fought in World War I but was killed in a flying accident.

Morris was born in Melbourne, Australia, but attended school in Bedford, Cape Colony. He studied botany at the University of Cape Town and won the 1908 medal for botany. He graduated with an Honours degree in botany in 1909. He subsequently became the District Commissioner for Fiji and A.D.C. to the Governor. He joined the Royal Flying Corps in World War I and rose to the rank of second lieutenant. He was killed in an aircraft accident in 1919 in England and left a wife, Sylvia Ena de Creft-Harford, and two daughters, Mary Morris and Ann Morris.
