= Listed buildings in Stainforth, South Yorkshire =

Stainforth is a civil parish in the metropolitan borough of Doncaster, South Yorkshire, England. The parish contains 13 listed buildings that are recorded in the National Heritage List for England. All the listed buildings are designated at Grade II, the lowest of the three grades, which is applied to "buildings of national importance and special interest". The parish contains the town of Stainforth and the village of South Bramwith, and the surrounding area. The buildings include a small country house, which is listed together with associated structures. The other listed buildings include smaller houses and cottages, a farmhouse and farm buildings, a swing bridge, a war memorial, and two headstocks from a former colliery.

== Buildings ==
Name and location	Photograph	Date	Notes
Timber-framed building 53.60048°N 1.03226°W		1570	The building is timber framed, with some timber framing exposed, and partly encased in rendered brick and weatherboarding. There is a double-pitched metal sheet roof, a single storey, and three bays. The building contains various openings, some blocked.
Town End Farmhouse; 53.60141°N 1.02334°W	—	1698 (probable)	The farmhouse, which has been altered, is in red brick, with dentilled eaves courses, and a twin pantile roof. There are two storeys and attics, the front has three bays, and a flat-topped gable with copings and shaped kneelers. The front contains casement windows with segmental heads and a chamfered datestone. In the right return is a doorway and casement windows, all with segmental-arched heads.
Bramwith Hall; 53.59726°N 1.05901°W	—	18th century	A small country house that was rebuilt in the early 19th century, it is in stuccoed brick on a plinth, with a floor band, an eaves band, and hipped Westmorland slate roofs. There are three storeys, five bays, and a two-storey two-bay extension on the right. In the centre is a Doric stone porch that has a full entablature with floral metopes, and the windows are sashes. In the extension is a casement window in the ground floor, and two sash windows above. At the rear are three bays and a central doorway with a scrolled and eared architrave, and a pediment on consoles, and above it is a stair window with a floating pediment.
Cartshed and granary, Fox Farm; 53.59591°N 1.06242°W		Late 18th century	The farm building consists of a cartshed, a granary, and a dovecote. It is in red brick, and has a pantile roof with coped gables and shaped kneelers. There are three storeys and three bays. In the ground floor is a three-bay arcade on square piers with segmental arches and keystones. External steps lead up to a doorway in the middle floor, and on its right are two casement windows, all with segmental heads. The top floor contains a central opening with a ledge and pigeon holes.
Poplar House; 53.59999°N 1.03415°W	—	Late 18th century	The house is rendered, and has an eaves band and a pantile roof. There are two storeys and attics, and three bays, the middle bay projecting. Steps lead up to a central recessed round arch containing a doorway with a semicircular fanlight and an open pediment, and the windows are sashes.
Gazebo, Bramwith Hall; 53.59750°N 1.05913°W	—	c. 1800	The gazebo is a square turret in stuccoed brick with an embattled parapet. There are two storeys, a single bay, and a two-storey outshut. On the north side are two doors, over which is a balcony with an iron balustrade, and behind it is a doorway with a fanlight flanked by lancet windows. The outshut has a lancet window and a lean-to slate roof.
Barn, Fox Farm; 53.59556°N 1.06217°W		Late 18th to early 19th century	The barn ranges are in red brick, with an eaves band, and a pantile roof with coped gables and shaped kneelers. There are two storeys, and two ranges at right angles, each with six bays. The openings include arched wagon entries, hatches, and slit vents.
Bramwith Bridge; 53.59611°N 1.06313°W		Early 19th century	A swing bridge carrying Low Lane over the River Don Navigation, with gritstone abutment walls, and a platform in steel and wood. The north abutment walls are concave with two round piers on each side. The south walls are convex, and contain the pivoting mechanism in a recess, with steps and a block.
Curtain wall and gate piers, Bramwith Hall; 53.59714°N 1.05967°W		Early 19th century	The walls enclosing the grounds of the house are in limestone facing the road, and in red brick facing the garden. They have stone coping, and are about 2 metres (6 ft 7 in) high. The walls on the northwest side sweep up to projecting gate piers with large ball finials, flanking a wrought iron gate set in a rendered brick panel.
Ha-ha and wall, Bramwith Hall; 53.59702°N 1.05826°W	—	Early 19th century	The ha-ha to the southeast of the house has a ditch, and a retaining wall in sandstone with stone coping that runs for about 70 metres (230 ft). At the northeast end, it continues as a garden wall about 2 metres (6 ft 7 in) high.
Lock Cottages; 53.60406°N 1.02605°W		Early 19th century	A pair of cottages between the River Don and the River Don Navigation, they are in yellow brick with cogged eaves, a pantile roof, and two storeys. On the front are paired doorways with fanlights, and sash windows, all with segmental heads. At the rear are square-headed doorways and horizontally-sliding sash windows.
War memorial 53.59526°N 1.03108°W		c. 1920	The war memorial is in a square enclosure to the east of the chapel in Stainforth Cemetery. It is in sandstone, and consists of the statue of a soldier standing on a square Doric column on a three-stepped plinth. On the base of the column are a carved anchor and a lifebelt. Inscribed on the plinth are the names of those lost in the two World Wars.
Headstocks, Hatfield Main Colliery; 53.59418°N 1.01478°W		1922	The two headstocks served the coal mine which is now closed, No. 1 serving the primary coal drawing shaft, and No. 2 the primary man-riding shaft. No. 1 has steel lattice beams and steel plates on a concrete raft. No. 2 is in steel reinforced concrete.
