= Richard Budge =

Entrepreneur and coal miner

Richard John Budge (19 April 1947 – 18 July 2016) was a coal mining entrepreneur and chairman of the Coal Industry Social Welfare Organisation (CISWO).

== Early life ==
He went to Boston Grammar School in Lincolnshire. He studied Fine Arts at the University of Manchester.

== Career ==
He entered the coal mining industry when he joined the company of Retford-based A.F. Budge, owned by his brother Tony (1939–2010), which ran opencast mines. It was also involved in civil engineering schemes such as the construction of motorways. The company also sponsored the December Gold Cup horse race at Cheltenham Racecourse from 1988 to 1991.

In February 1992, Richard Budge bought the opencast coal and Plant division from the family business with venture capital backing from Schroder Ventures for circa £103m, a transaction approved by Charterhouse Ventures and Prudential Ventures which were preference shareholders of A. F. Budge. A.F. Budge was majority owned by his elder brother Tony Budge.

=== RJB Mining ===
When the UK coal industry was privatised in 1994, Budge bought most of the pits for £815m, forming RJB Mining, which he had started in 1992 after buying his brother's opencast business division for £102.5m. This led to Budge being christened King Coal. He bought three out of five packages of the UK coal industry (17 deep mine pits) on 30 December 1994 for around £700m. At the time there were 19 deep mines left in the UK. The last of these remaining deep mine pits, Kellingley Colliery, closed on 18 December 2015.

When the Labour government came to power, Budge informed the government that the pits would have to close unless he secured long-term contracts from the electricity generators National Power and Powergen (now called E.ON UK).

On 14 July 2001 he quit as CEO of RJB Mining, which later became known as UK Coal.

=== Coalpower ===
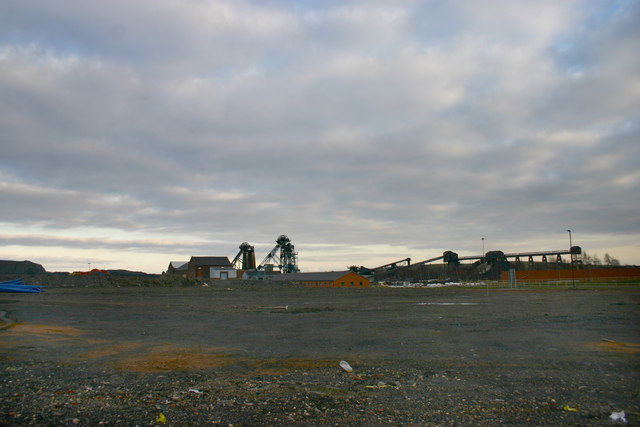
Hatfield Colliery in 2009, site of the 1996 film Brassed Off

He formed the company, Coalpower, in 2001. It bought the Hatfield Colliery, at Stainforth, in April 2004 from Hatfield Coal Company, helped by £7m of state aid.

In late 2003, Coalpower went into administration.

=== Powerfuel ===
His company, Powerfuel, was 48% owned by Budge and 52% owned by KRU, Russia's second biggest coal company. In April 2007, he re-opened the pit at Stainforth, at a cost of £100m. financed by £50m from VTB Bank. Powerfuel went into administration in December 2010 owing £80 m to a combination of VTB Bank and ING Group.

== Personal life ==
In 1968 he married Rosalind White and lived at Wiseton in north Nottinghamshire near Gringley-on-the-Hill, close to the A631. He was a member of the Worshipful Company of Fuellers.

Richard Budge died of prostate cancer on 18 July 2016 in Retford, Nottinghamshire.

== See also ==
- Clean coal technology
- South Yorkshire Coalfield
