= 1960 Society of Film and Television Arts Television Awards =

UK television awards ceremony

Society of Film and Television Arts Television Awards
- Date: 1960

Highlights
- Best Actor: Patrick McGoohan
- Best Actress: Catherine Lacey

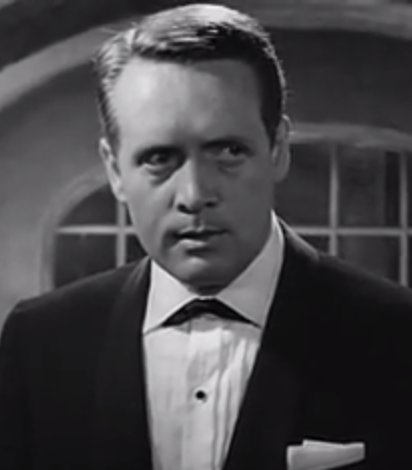
Patrick McGoohan in 1962

The 1960 Society of Film and Television Arts Television Awards is the United Kingdom's premier television awards ceremony. The awards later became known as the British Academy Television Awards, under which name they are still given.

== Winners ==
- Actor
  - Patrick McGoohan
- Actress
  - Catherine Lacey
- Designer
  - Clifford Hatts
- Drama Production
  - William Kotcheff
- Factual
  - Denis Mitchell
- Light Entertainment (Artist)
  - Tony Hancock
- Light Entertainment (Production)
  - Bill Ward
- Personality
  - John Freeman
- Scriptwriting
  - Galton and Simpson
- Special Award
  - John Elliot
- Writers Award
  - Galton and Simpson
