= Holbeck Hall Hotel =

Hotel in Scarborough, North Yorkshire, England; destroyed by 1993 landslide

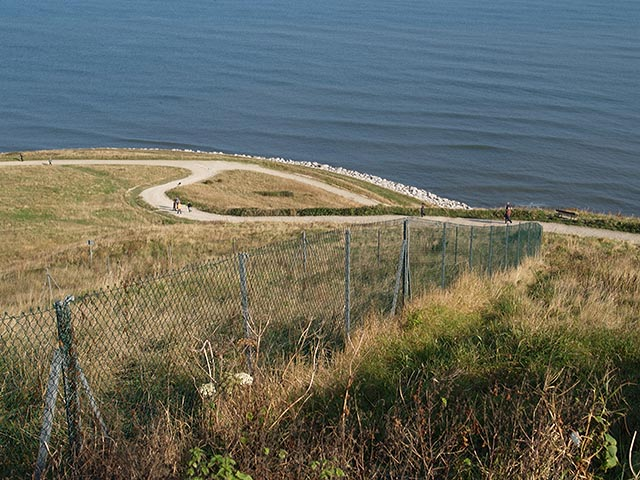
- The site of the Holbeck Hall Hotel
- Former names: Roosevelt Hotel

General information
- Type: Hotel; (originally private house)
- Location: Scarborough, North Yorkshire, England
- Coordinates: 54°16′00″N 0°23′27″W (grid reference TA0486)
- Inaugurated: 1879
- Destroyed: 5 June 1993
- Client: George Alderson Smith
- Owner: The Turner Family

Technical details
- Floor count: 3

The Holbeck Hall Hotel was a clifftop hotel in Scarborough, North Yorkshire, England, owned by the Turner family. It was built in 1879 by George Alderson Smith as a private residence, and was later converted to a hotel.

On 4 June 1993, 55 metres (180 ft) of the 70 metres (230 ft) hotel garden had disappeared from view, the beginning of a landslide which gradually became more severe. The landslip was first reported to the police, early on 4 June, by Peter Swales, who took a morning walk on South Cliff putting green and saw there had been a landslide and the hotel was at risk of collapsing. He went to the police station and reported that the guests were in imminent danger. Finally, on 5 June 1993, after a day of heavy rain, parts of the building collapsed, making news around the world. The hotel's chimney stack collapsed live on television just as Yorkshire TV's Calendar regional news programme went on air covering the building's precarious condition. Richard Whiteley was presenting the item at the time of the collapse. The remainder of the building was demolished for safety reasons. One of the likely contributing causes of the landslide was the substantial rain in the two months before it occurred, estimated to have been around 140 millimetres (5.5 in) of rainfall. The mud flow from the landslide protruded 135 metres (443 ft) beyond the high-water mark.

Landslides are a common problem in Scarborough and along the coast from Filey to Whitby. One reason for this could be that the cliffs are made up of glacial till and Scalby Formation which is easily worn away under heavy rain and pressure.

In 1997, the hotel's collapse became the subject of a significant court case in English civil law (Holbeck Hall Hotel Ltd v Scarborough BC) when the owners of the hotel attempted to sue Scarborough Borough Council for damages, alleging that as owners of the shoreline they had not taken any practical measures at all to prevent the landslip – from soft, to hard engineering, nothing was done. The claim was rejected on the grounds that the council was not liable for the causes of the slip because it was not reasonably foreseeable. Reasonable foreseeability is a requirement for liability in negligence and nuisance in English and Welsh tort law.

== See also ==
- List of landslips in Yorkshire
