= Allan Surtees =

English actor (1924–2000)

- Born: Allan Joseph Dobby; 31 December 1924; Liverpool, England
- Died: 1 November 2000 (aged 75); London, England
- Occupation: Actor

Allan Joseph Surtees (31 December 1924 – 1 November 2000) was an English actor who appeared in many television productions and films over a 30-year period.

== Television appearances ==
His television appearances included roles on Coronation Street as councillor Ben Critchley, Bill Brand (1976), Rosie (1977–1981) as uncle Norman, Lovejoy, Brookside, Peak Practice, The Professionals, The Chinese Detective, Play of the Month, The Bill and The Brothers McGregor as Colwyn Stanley.

== Film appearances ==
His film appearances include: Frankenstein Must Be Destroyed (1969), Eye of the Needle (1981) and Erik the Viking (1989).

Year	Title	Role	Notes
1969	Frankenstein Must Be Destroyed	Police Sergeant	
1969	The Adding Machine	Apartment tenant	
1970	The Reckoning	Bingo MC	Uncredited
1979	Black Island	George Moody	
1981	Eye of the Needle	Colonel Terry	
1988	The First Kangaroos	George the Barman	
1989	Murder on Line One		
1989	Erik the Viking	Thorfinn's Dad	
