= Mary Morris =

British actress (1915–1988)

- Born: Mary Lilian Agnes Morris; 13 December 1915; Lautoka, Fiji
- Died: 14 October 1988 (aged 72); Aigle, Switzerland
- Occupation: Actress
- Years active: 1937–1988

Mary Lilian Agnes Morris (13 December 1915 – 14 October 1988) was a Fijian-born British actress.

== Life and career ==
Morris was the daughter of Australian-born Herbert Stanley Morris, a botanist, and his wife, Sylvia Ena de Creft-Harford. She moved to Britain with her family as an infant, and her father died in an aircraft accident when she was three years old. She trained at the Royal Academy of Dramatic Art.

Morris made her debut in Lysistrata at the Gate Theatre, London in 1936. She performed with Leslie Howard in "Pimpernel" Smith (1941) and Anna Petrovitch in the Ealing war movie Undercover (1943) as the wife of a Serbian guerrilla leader. On television, she played Professor Madeleine Dawnay in the science-fiction television drama A for Andromeda (and its sequel, The Andromeda Breakthrough), Queen Margaret in the BBC's An Age of Kings (a version of Shakespeare's History Plays), Lady Macbeth in the 1960 radio production of Macbeth, and Cleopatra in Antony and Cleopatra (as part of the BBC's adaptation of Shakespeare's Roman plays, The Spread of the Eagle) in 1963.

She played Number Two in The Prisoner's episode "Dance of the Dead". After an absence of many years, she reappeared in diverse film roles such as Madame Fidolia the Russian ballerina and theatre school director in the BBC television serial Ballet Shoes (1975), and the mother of the murdered boy in the 1977 horror film Full Circle. She also appeared on television in Doctor Who in the story Kinda (1982), playing the role of the shaman Panna opposite Peter Davison.

Her other television appearances included the Countess Vronsky in the BBC's Anna Karenina (1977); the macabre, ancient relative in the Walter de la Mare story Seaton's Aunt (1983) in Granada Television's Shades of Darkness series; a recently deceased woman attempting to cheat death in a 1988 episode of HBO's Ray Bradbury Theater; Mrs Browning-Browning in Stephen Wyatt's Claws (BBC 1 1987); and the formidable matriarch in Police at the Funeral, an adaptation of one of Margery Allingham's Albert Campion stories for the BBC's Campion (1989).

In addition to her film role, she played Elizabeth I on a 'Makers of History' LP record, using the queen's spoken and written words and contemporary music, issued by EMI in 1964.

== Death ==
Morris died from heart failure, aged 72, on 14 October 1988 in Aigle, Switzerland.

== Complete filmography ==
=== Feature films ===
- Victoria the Great (1937) – Duchess of Kent
- Prison Without Bars (1938) – Renee
- The Spy in Black (1939) – Chauffeuse
- The Thief of Bagdad (1940) – Halima/the Silver Maiden
- Who Killed Jack Robins? (1940)
- Major Barbara (1941) – A Girl
- "Pimpernel" Smith (1941) – Ludmilla Koslowski
- Undercover (1943) – Anna Petrovitch
- The Man from Morocco (1945) – Sarah Duboste
- The Agitator (1945) – Lettie Shackleton
- Train of Events (1949) – Louise (segment "The Actor")
- High Treason (1951) – Anna Braun
- The Pythoness (1951) – Narrator (voice)
- Full Circle (1977) – Greta Braden

=== Television ===
- The Trial of Madeleine Smith (1949, BBC Television) – Madeleine Smith
- The Young Elizabeth (1953, BBC Television) – Elizabeth Tudor
- The Philco Television Playhouse (1953)
- Six Characters in Search of an Author (1954, BBC Television) – The Step-Daughter
- The Face of Love (1954, BBC Television) – Cressida
- Uncle Harry (1958, BBC Television) – Lettie Quincey
- Under Western Eyes (1962, TV movie) – Tekla
- An Age of Kings (1960) – Queen Margaret, widow to Henry VI
- Interpol Calling (1960) – Ingrid Hoffman
- A for Andromeda (1961) – Professor Madeleine Dawnay
- The Andromeda Breakthrough (1962) – Madeleine Dawnay
- Ghost Squad (1963) – Dr. Ibanez
- The Spread of the Eagle (TV series) (1963) – 3 episodes as Cleopatra
- Theatre 625 (1965–1968) – Sister Leonora / Agatha / Doktor von Zahnd
- Thirty-Minute Theatre (1967) – The woman
- The Prisoner (1967) – Number Two
- Plays of Today: Men of Iron (1969) – "Scotch Ellen
- Village Hall (TV series), Series 1 Episode 5, ‘Dancing in the Dark’ (1974) – Dame
- An Unofficial Rose (1974–1975) – Emma Sands
- Ballet Shoes (1975) – Madame Fidolia
- Play for Today (1976) – Bernarda
- Anna Karenina (1977) – Countess Vronsky
- King Richard II (1978, BBC Television Shakespeare) – Duchess of Gloucester
- Doctor Who (1982) – Panna
- Diana (1984) – Miss Westcott
- The Life and Death of King John (1984, BBC Television Shakespeare) – Queen Elinor
- The Moon Over Soho (1985, TV play) – Frieda King
- Claws (1986)
- The Ray Bradbury Theater (1988) – Matilda Hanks
- Campion (1989; posthumous) – Caroline Faraday
