= St Botolph's Church, Carlton in Cleveland =

Church in Carlton, North Yorkshire, England

Coordinates: 54°26′02″N 1°13′13″W

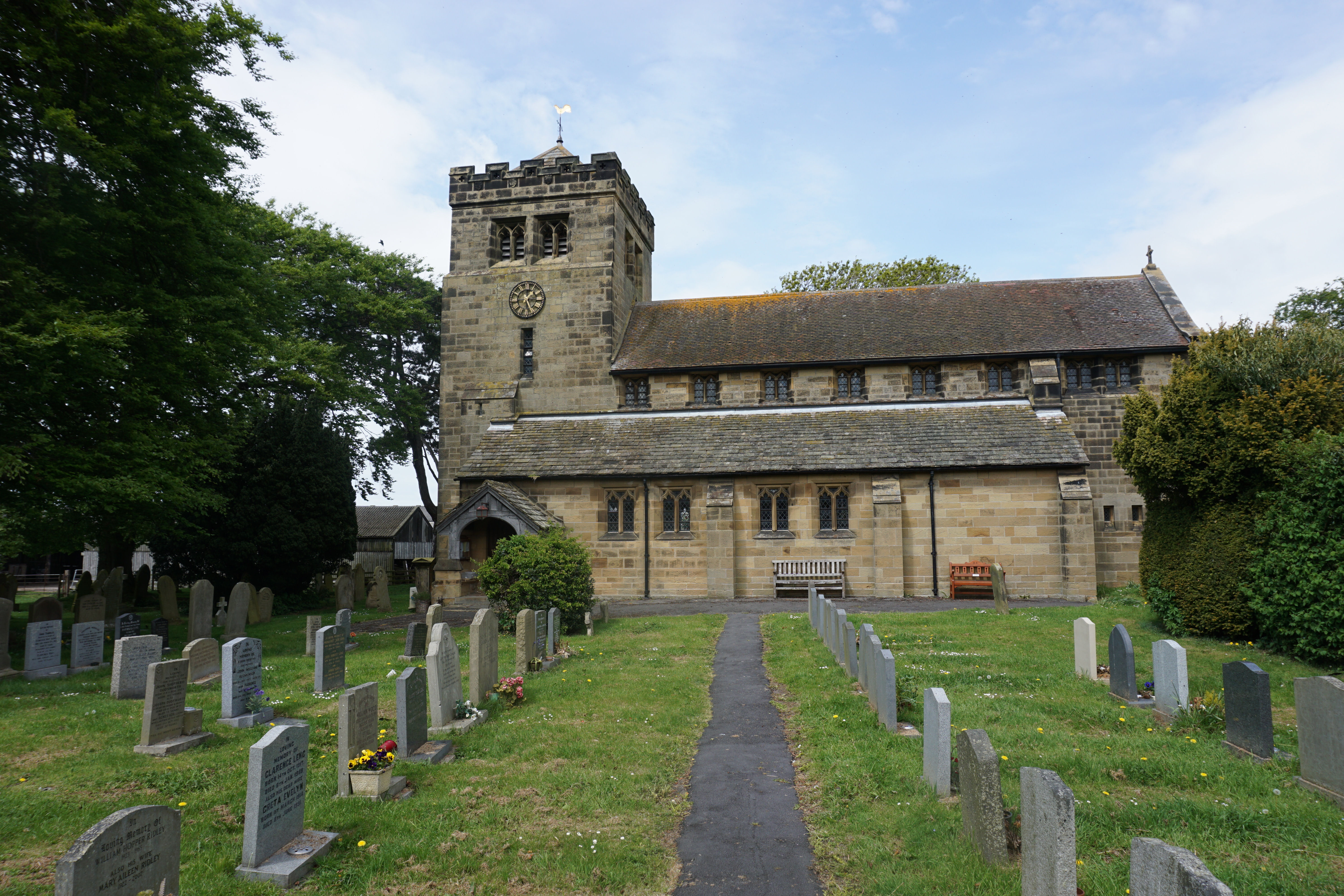
The church, in 2015

St Botolph's Church is the parish church of Carlton in Cleveland, a village in North Yorkshire, in England.

There was a chapel in Carlton in the Mediaeval period, and the village was given its own parish by 1611. In 1808, its church was described as "a small modern-built structure", a simple rectangular building with a south porch and west bell gable. It was renovated from 1878 to 1879, with north and south transepts being added, but it burned down in 1881. George Sanger, the local vicar, was charged with arson, but was acquitted as there was no firm evidence against him. Occasional services were held within the walls of the ruined church, which was not rebuilt until 1896. The new building was designed by Temple Moore, and was in the Arts and Crafts style. It was Grade II listed in 1966.

The church is built of sandstone, the main roof is tiled, and on the aisles and porch are stone flags. It consists of a nave with a clerestory, north and south aisles, a south porch, a chancel, and a west tower embraced by the aisles. The tower has two stages, the lower stage tall, with a staircase on the northeast in a buttress-like projection, square-headed windows, a clock face, paired bell openings with cusped ogee heads, a cornice and an embattled parapet. The windows on the north and south sides are very small, but the east window is large.

== See also ==
- Listed buildings in Carlton in Cleveland
