= Hatfield Colliery =

Former coal mine in South Yorkshire, England

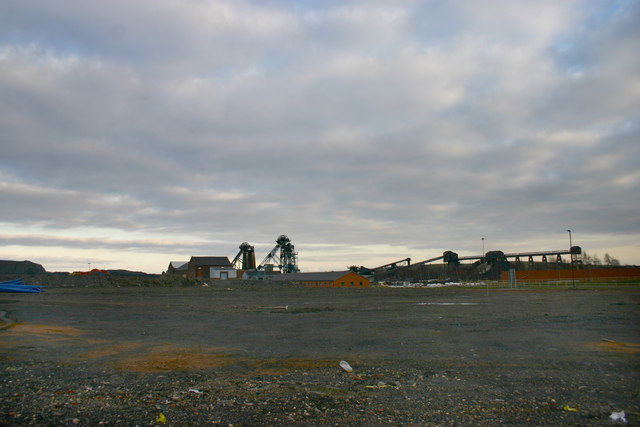
- Hatfield Colliery

- Location in South Yorkshire
- Location: Stainforth, DN7 5TZ, Doncaster, South Yorkshire, England; 53°35′36″N 1°00′52″W
- Products: Coal
- Opened: 1916
- Closed: 2015
- Company: Hatfield Colliery Partnership Limited
- Acquired: 2013

Hatfield Colliery, also known as Hatfield Main Colliery, was a colliery in the South Yorkshire Coalfield, mining the High Hazel coal seam. The colliery was around 1 mile (1.6 km) northwest of Hatfield, South Yorkshire, adjacent north of the railway line from Doncaster to Scunthorpe (former South Yorkshire Railway, or Barnsley to Barnetby Line) northeast of Hatfield and Stainforth railway station.

The colliery opened in 1916. The pit was stopped in 2001, and restarted 2007; the mine passed through a number of different owners in the early part of the 21st century, with subsequent operators entering receivership. During the same period the site was proposed as the location for high-technology coal burning power stations schemes which did not proceed.

In 2013 the major Doncaster-Thorne railway line which connected South Yorkshire to the Humber ports and Scunthorpe was blocked by a landslip at the colliery spoil for around 6 months.

From late 2013 the mine was employee owned by the 'Hatfield Colliery Partnership Limited'. Due to lack of demand for coal products the colliery shut down at the end of June 2015.

== History ==
=== 1910–2001 ===
In December 1910 the Hatfield Main Colliery Company was formed by Emerson Bainbridge. On 11 September 1916 the first main shaft was completed, followed on 1 April 1917 by the second shaft. The pit exploited coal from the High Hazel coal seam (see Coal Seams of the South Yorkshire Coalfield).

In January 1927 it was bought by the Carlton Main Colliery Company. In January 1947 it became part of the National Coal Board. In 1967 the Hatfield and Thorne collieries were merged, becoming separate again in February 1978. They were merged again on 1 February 1986. On 18 November 1993, a time of many pit closures, it was announced the combined pit would close, which took place on 3 December 1993, when under ownership of British Coal.

On 4 January 1994, a team from the pit's management announced they wanted to re-open the pit, forming Hatfield Coal Company Ltd on 25 January 1994. The first coal was dug on 7 July 1994. In its first year of operation the company made a profit of £2.4 million.

On 9 August 2001 the pit closed, resulting in the loss of 223 jobs; the site was mothballed with funding from the Department of Trade and Industry.

=== 2001–2015 ===
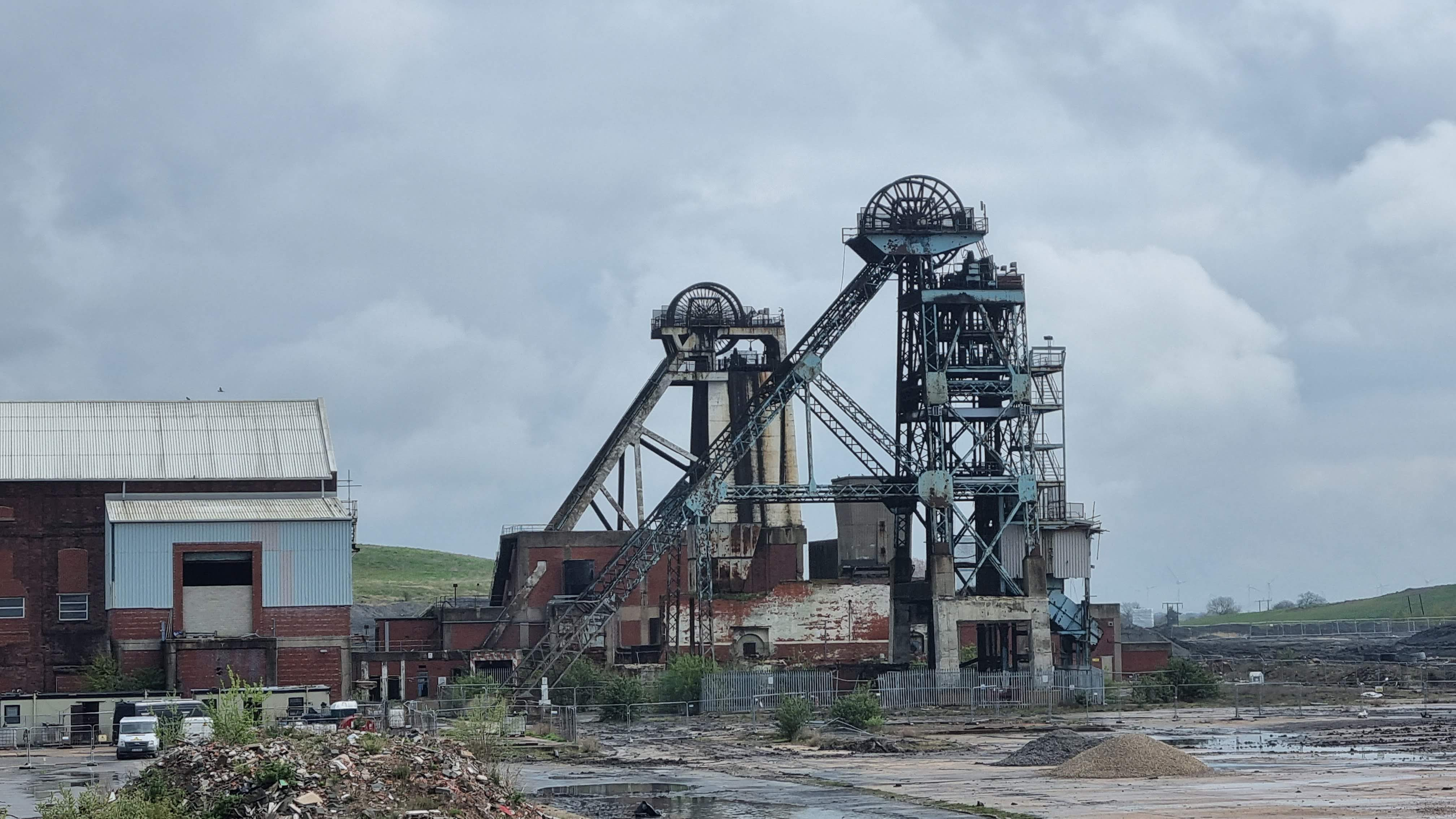
Hatfield Colliery Headstocks

In October 2001, Richard Budge, former owner of RJB Mining, took control of the pit, under ownership of the company Coalpower Ltd.

In 2003 Coalpower published plans for a 450 MW power station at the site. In late 2003 Coalpower went into administration, in part due to geological problems at the coal face affecting production. The pit closed in early 2004.

In 2006 Richard Budge restarted the colliery, and started planning for a carbon capture and storage (CCS) coal burning powerstation at the site, via company Powerfuel. Russian coal company Kuzbassrazrezugol (KRU) acquired a 51% stake in Powerfuel. Coal production at the pit was restarted, producing coal in 2007; with production made economically viable through a doubling in the price of coal between 2004 and 2008. The CCS project was approved to receive £180 million of EU funding in 2009. The CCS project failed to obtain enough investment to proceed. In 2010 Powerfuel entered administration, in part due to coal production problems.

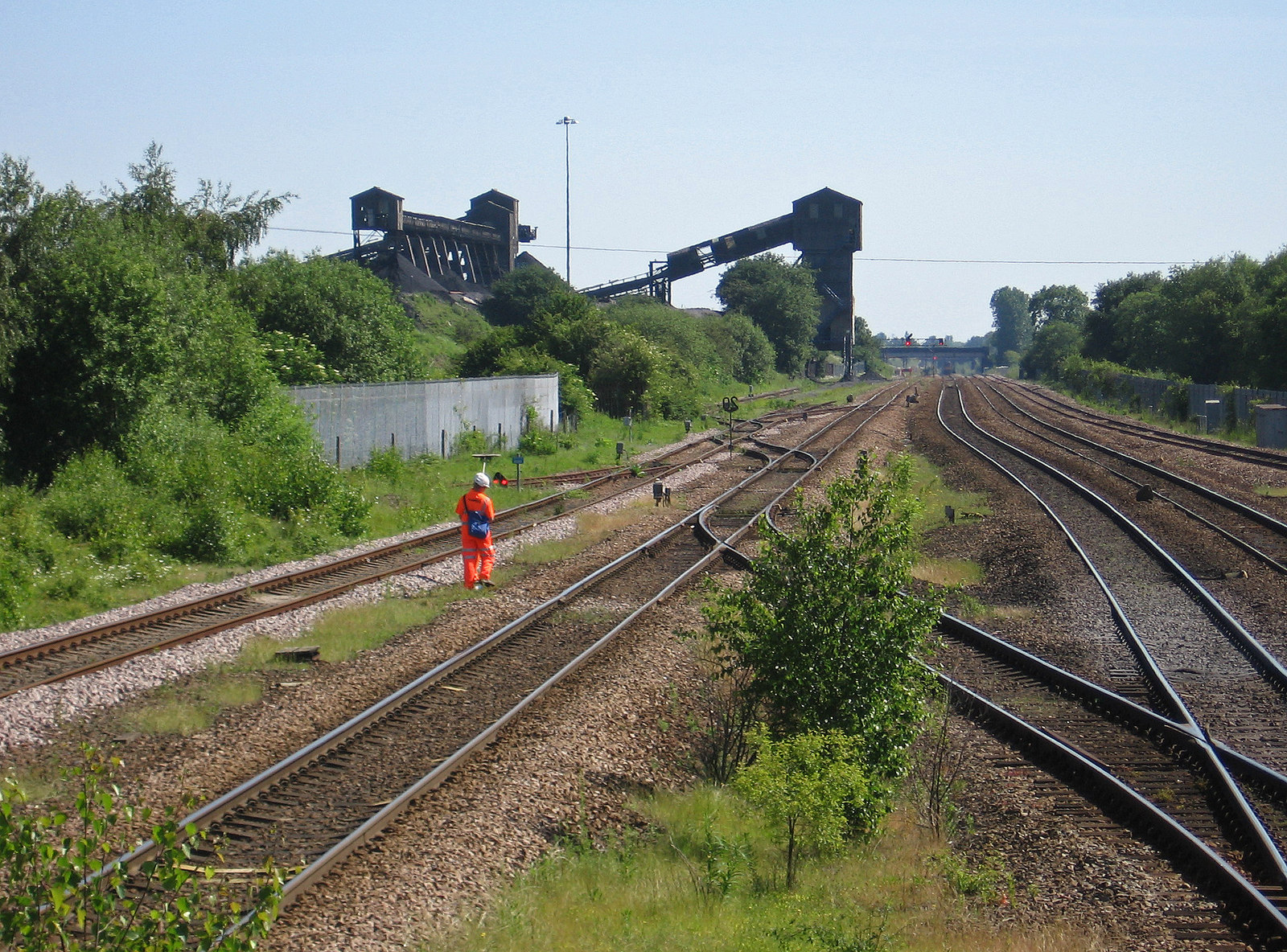
Hatfield Colliery while still open in June 2014

In 2011 2Co Energy Ltd. (via holding Entero BV, backed by ING Bank) acquired the company, and announced it would continue and rename the CCS project as Don Valley Power Project. The colliery was then managed under contract by Hargreaves Services plc. In 2013 70 of approximately 700 employees were made redundant after a return to a three shift pattern due to production issues.

In December 2013 the employee controlled company Hatfield Colliery Partnership Limited (HCPL) purchased the mine from ING Bank. In late 2014 the National Union of Mineworkers provided the pit with a £4 million bridging loan whilst the pit move production to a new pit face.

In June 2015 the colliery ceased production, unable to sell its coal due to increases in the UK carbon tax.

== Hatfield landslip ==
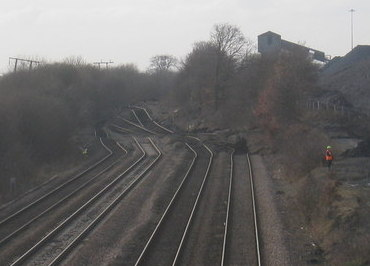
Landslip, 16 February 2013

In February 2013, a landslide occurred on a spoil tip used by the colliery. The landslide displaced and blocked the main railway line (Barnsley to Barnetby, or Doncaster to Thorne Line, formerly the South Yorkshire Railway) north-east of Hatfield and Stainforth railway station. The closure affected rail services between Doncaster and Goole (to Hull) and Scunthorpe (to Cleethorpes). The route is also a major freight line, with around 20% of UK rail freight using the section, and freight services had to be diverted over lines via Brigg and Lincoln.

The slipped material consisted of excavated mudstone waste enclosing a well of 200,000 cubic metres (7,100,000 cu ft) of multi-roll filter slurry, which has a moisture content of 40% and is produced during the process of washing and reclaiming coal fines. The movement of the spoil displaced the four running lines, and a siding, approximately 5 metres (16 ft) vertically and 20 metres (66 ft) horizontally, over a distance of 300 metres (980 ft).

The recovery operation required the movement of around 1,000,000 cubic metres (35,000,000 cu ft) of material in total and the replacement of around 500 metres (1,600 ft) of quadruple-track railway. The line reopened in early July 2013, with a return to a full timetable on 29 July. Movement of the colliery waste continued for several months after the reopening of the railway.

The slip was thought to have been caused by rainfall soaking the spoil heap, which was still being added to, allowing the heap to overcome the resistance of the surrounding loose natural soil lying over a sandstone base.

== See also ==
- Hatfield Main F.C.
- Brassed Off, 1996 film using the colliery as a location
- List of landslips in Yorkshire
- Listed buildings in Stainforth, South Yorkshire
