= L Marsland Gander =

Leonard Marsland Gander (1902–1986), who wrote as L Marsland Gander, was a journalist, war correspondent, and radio and television correspondent, chiefly for The Daily Telegraph. He was also a contributor to the Telegossip section of Television and Short-Wave World magazine.

In 1935 he was appointed as the first ever television critic by the Daily Telegraph, having already worked on the paper as their radio correspondent. During World War II he served as a war correspondent, and was at the Battle of Monte Cassino in May 1944, and the Liberation of Amsterdam in 1945.

In 1946 Gander returned to his earlier post at The Daily Telegraph as the radio and television correspondent and critic, remaining on the paper's staff until his retirement in 1970. His autobiography After These Many Quests was published in 1950.

Gander was a castaway on an edition of the BBC Radio programme Desert Island Discs broadcast on 17 March 1969.

His private papers are in the Imperial War Museum in London.
