= Nicoletta Rizzi =

Italian actress (1940–2010)

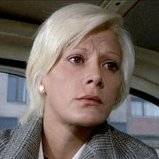
- Born: 1 January 1940; Milan, Italy
- Died: 17 January 2010 (aged 70); Milan, Italy
- Occupation: Actress

Nicoletta Rizzi (1 January 1940 in Milan – 17 January 2010 in Milan) was an Italian television, stage and film actress.

== Life ==
She was mainly active on television, where she was best known for the title role in the television series A come Andromeda.

She was co-founder and secretary of SAI (Society of Italian Actors), later known as Sindacato Attori, a union of actors affiliated to CGIL.

== Selected filmography ==
- Come Play with Me (1968)
- Cuore di mamma (1969)
- A come Andromeda (1971)
- Indian Summer (1972)
- I Nicotera (1972)
- The Last Desperate Hours (1974)
- Gamma (1975)
