= Peter Halliday =

Welsh actor (1924–2012)

- Halliday in A for Andromeda, 1961
- Born: 2 June 1924; Cefn Mawr, Wales
- Died: 18 February 2012 (aged 87); London, England
- Occupation: Actor
- Years active: 1954–2006
- Spouse(s): Simone Lovell (m. 1956; div. 197?)
- Children: 3

Peter Halliday (2 June 1924 – 18 February 2012) was a Welsh actor.

== Early life ==
The son of an auctioneer and estate agent, Halliday was brought up in Welshpool in Montgomeryshire, and attended Oswestry School in Shropshire. On leaving school he became an apprentice auctioneer with his father, but he had no desire to make it his career. He worked briefly for Rolls-Royce in Hucknall, Nottinghamshire before being called up by the Army during the Second World War, serving in Iraq, Palestine and Egypt.

While still in the Army, he auditioned successfully for the Royal Academy of Dramatic Art during time on leave.

== Career ==
Halliday joined the Shakespeare Memorial Theatre Company alongside Richard Burton, Michael Redgrave and Ralph Richardson. He played regularly at Theatr Clwyd for six years, and spent two years at the National Theatre.

He played Dr. John Fleming in A for Andromeda (1961) and its sequel, The Andromeda Breakthrough (1962). He played various roles in Doctor Who, appearing in four stories between 1968 and 1988, and also provided the voices for two alien species in another two Doctor Who stories in 1970. He featured in episodes of other science fiction programmes including Out of the Unknown, UFO, Doomwatch and The Tripods. Although the vast majority of his screen roles were on television, he appeared in a few films, including the Merchant Ivory drama The Remains of the Day (1993).

== Personal life ==
In 1956, Halliday married Simone Lovell, daughter of the Canadian-born actor Raymond Lovell. The couple went on to have three sons, before divorcing.

== Death ==
He died on 18 February 2012 in London aged 87.

== Filmography ==
=== Film ===
- The Battle of the River Plate (1956) – Guani's Secretary (uncredited)
- Dunkirk (1958) – Battery Major
- Captain Clegg (1962) – 1st Sailor Jack Pott
- Dilemma (1962) – Harry Barnes
- Calamity the Cow (1967) – Sergeant Watkins
- Sunday Bloody Sunday (1971) – Rowing Husband
- Clinic Exclusive (1971) – Mr. Fawcett
- Virgin Witch (1971) – Club Manager
- Madhouse (1974) – Psychiatrist
- The Swordsman (1974) – Rabelais
- Keep It Up Downstairs (1976) – P.C. Harbottle / Old Harbottle
- Giro City (1982) – Government Minister
- The Remains of the Day (1993) – Government Minister
- Lassie (2005) – Vicar (final film role)

=== Television ===
- Scotland Yard (1954) - Gypsy
- The Time Has Come (1960) – George Harris
- A for Andromeda (1961) – Dr. John Fleming
- The Andromeda Breakthrough (1962) – Fleming
- The Invasion, in Doctor Who (1968) – Packer & Cybermen voice
- A Question of Priorities, in UFO (1969) – Dr. Segal
- Doctor Who and the Silurians, in Doctor Who (1970) – Silurians (voice)
- The Ambassadors of Death, in Doctor Who (1970) – Aliens' Voices (voice)
- Carnival of Monsters, in Doctor Who (1973) – Pletrac
- Looking for Clancy (1975) – Sam Cook
- City of Death, in Doctor Who (1979) – Soldier
- Remembrance of the Daleks, in Doctor Who (1988) – Vicar
- Hearts and Minds (1995) – Shotton
