= John Elliot (author) =

English writer

- Born: 4 July 1918; Reading, England
- Died: 14 August 1997 (aged 79); Clifton, England
- Occupations: Screenwriter and television producer.
- Spouse: Elizabeth Haynes (m. 1945)
- Children: two daughters, and one son (deceased)
- Writing career
- Period: 1954–1993
- Genres: Drama, adventure, science fiction

John Herbert Elliot (4 July 1918 – 14 August 1997) was a British novelist, screenwriter, director, and television producer He co-wrote the science fiction serial A for Andromeda (1961) with the astronomer Fred Hoyle, and created the BBC drama series Mogul, renamed The Troubleshooters (1965–1972).

== Early life ==
Elliot was born in Reading in 1918. He spent much of the Second World War in the Middle East, mainly in the desert.

== Career ==
=== Documentary films ===
After the war Elliot served what he called a film apprenticeship with a documentary company whose sponsors included the Central Office of Information and the Anglo-Iranian Oil Company. He joined Greenpark Productions in 1946 and directed documentaries there until 1949, among them Village in the Wheatfield (1948). From 1949 to 1953 he was head of documentary and sequence film production at BBC Television, where his films included Henry Moore (1951), which won an award at the Venice Film Festival. He wrote and produced War in the Air (1954–1955), a fifteen-part history of the air war and the BBC's first television film series, and in 1955–1956 was film and television officer at the United Nations in New York.

=== BBC drama ===
Elliot joined the BBC Drama Department as a writer-producer in 1956. His productions included A Man from the Sun (1956), a pioneering drama aimed at a West Indian audience, and The Golden Egg (1958), a dramatised documentary about big business. He shared the Guild of Television Producers and Directors' special award for 1959 with the interviewer John Freeman, and was producer of the BBC's Sunday-night plays. In 1961–1962 he was Assistant Head of the Television Script Department, and in those years he wrote A for Andromeda and its sequel, The Andromeda Breakthrough (1962), with Hoyle. He then produced the drama series First Night (1963–1964).

=== Mogul and The Troubleshooters ===
Elliot left the BBC staff in 1964 to work as a freelance writer. His proposal for a drama series about the oil industry became Mogul, first broadcast in July 1965 and renamed The Troubleshooters from its second series in 1966. He devised the format, wrote 29 of its 136 episodes and commented on the scripts of the other writers. Its producer, Peter Graham Scott, won the Guild of Television Producers and Directors' award for a dramatic series for 1966, and in 1971 Elliot received the Shell International Award of the Society of Film and Television Arts (now BAFTA) for the series. Elliot described the making of the series in Mogul: The Making of a Myth (1970).

=== Bristol and later work ===
From 1967 to 1970 Elliot was Head of Programmes for BBC South and West in Bristol, after which he returned to freelance writing and directing. His other works include programmes such as Rainbow City, Fall of Eagles and The Double Dealers (which he created with Stephen Barlay), as well as novels, namely Long River, Duel and Blood Upon the Snow. He additionally worked with Fred Hoyle to produce novelisations of A for Andromeda and The Andromeda Breakthrough.

== Writing credits ==
Production	Notes	Broadcaster
War in the Air	15 episodes (1954–1955)	BBC Television
A Man from the Sun	Television film (1956)	BBC Television
The Golden Egg	Dramatised documentary (1958)	BBC Television
Television Playwright	"High Fidelity" (1959)	BBC Television
Who Pays the Piper?	Television film (1960)	BBC Television
BBC Sunday-Night Play	"Off Centre" (1961)	BBC Television
They Met in a City	"Ladies from a Spa" (1961)	BBC Television
A for Andromeda	7 episodes (co-written with Fred Hoyle, 1961)	BBC Television
The Andromeda Breakthrough	6 episodes (co-written with Fred Hoyle, 1962)	BBC Television
Maigret	"Death in Mind" (1962)	BBC Television
First Night	"The Youngest Profession" (1963); "Hunt the Man" (1964)	BBC1
Love Story	"The Truth Game" (1964)	ITV
Z-Cars	"A Morning's Sport" (1965)	BBC1
Mogul	29 episodes (1965–1972)	BBC1
Rainbow City	"What Sort of a Boy?" (1967); "Why You Marry?" (1967); "A Better Fortune" (1967); "Always on Sunday" (1967)	BBC1
A Stranger on the Hills	Television film (1970)	BBC1
BBC Play of the Month	"Platonov" (1971)	BBC1
Brett	"The Saxby Route" (1971)	BBC1
Play for Today	"Better Than the Movies" (1972); "The Chief Mourner" (1979)	BBC1
The Shadow of the Tower	"The White Hart" (1972)	BBC2
Shelley	Television film (1972)	BBC2
The Fox	Television film (1973)	BBC2
Fall of Eagles	Television miniseries (1974)	BBC1
The Double Dealers	Series co-created with Stephen Barlay (1974); "Come in Number One" (1974); "Cut Down Like a Flower" (1974)	BBC2
The Madness	Television film (1976)	BBC2
According to Hoyle	Television film (1977)	BBC2
A Life at Stake	"So, Who's Sick?" (1978)	BBC
Spy!	"The Murder Machine" (1980); "The Venlo Incident" (1980)	BBC1
Escape	"Hijack to Mogadishu" (1980)	BBC2
The Brack Report	"Chapter 3" (1982); "Chapter 4" (1982); "Chapter 9" (1982)	ITV
Natural World	"Man Eaters of India" (1986)	BBC
Flying for Fun: An Affair with an Aeroplane	Television film (1987)	BBC1
A Chance to Dance	Television film (1993)	ITV
A for Andromeda	Television film (2006)	BBC

== Awards and nominations ==
Year	Award	Work	Category	Result	Reference
1951	Venice Film Festival	Henry Moore		Won	
1960	Society of Film and Television Arts Awards	Television	Special	Won	
1971	British Academy Television Awards	The Troubleshooters	Shell International Award	Won	

== Books by John Elliot ==
- A for Andromeda (with Fred Hoyle), 1962, Souvenir Press, ISBN 978-0-285-63588-3
- Andromeda Breakthrough (with Fred Hoyle), 1964, Souvenir Press; 1966, Corgi Books
- Long River, 1967, Souvenir Press, ISBN 9780330024617
- Duel, 1969, Souvenir Press, ISBN 9780285502383
- MOGUL: The Making of a Myth, 1970, Barrie & Jenkins, ISBN 9780214650789
- Fall of Eagles, 1974, British Broadcasting Corp., ISBN 9780563124702
- Blood Upon the Snow, 1977, Souvenir Press, ISBN 9780285622470
