= Barnby Dun =

Village in Doncaster, South Yorkshire, England

Coordinates: 53.57°N 1.07°W

- Village
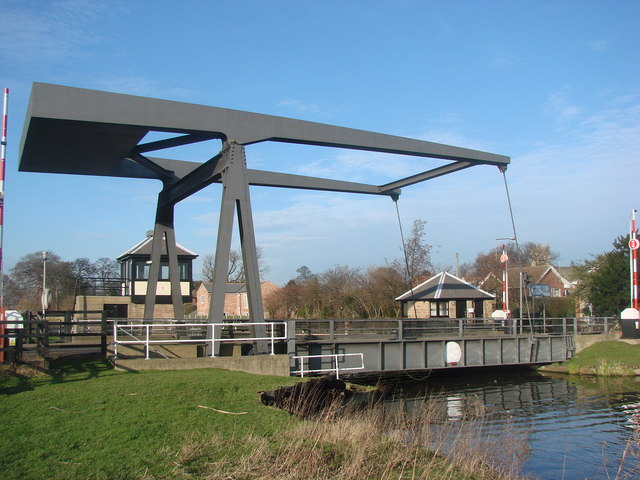
- Lifting bridge

- Location within South Yorkshire
  - London: 148 mi (238 km)
- Civil parish: Barnby Dun with Kirk Sandall
- Metropolitan borough: Doncaster
- Metropolitan county: South Yorkshire
- Region: Yorkshire and the Humber
- Country: England
- Sovereign state: United Kingdom
- Post town: Doncaster
- Postcode district: DN3
- Dialling code: 01302
- Police: South Yorkshire
- Fire: South Yorkshire
- Ambulance: Yorkshire
- UK Parliament: Doncaster North

Barnby Dun (/ˈbɑːnbɪ/) is a village in Doncaster, South Yorkshire, England. Together with Kirk Sandall it forms the civil parish of Barnby Dun with Kirk Sandall. It lies between Arksey and Stainforth. It is located about 4 miles north-east of Doncaster city centre.

Barnby Dun has a long history and was mentioned in the Domesday Book of 1086. The village has a church dedicated to Saint Peter and Saint Paul, the structure of which dates back to the 13th century. Throughout its history, it has been a primarily agricultural village with later ties to industry; railways arrived at the village in the 1840s, and the nearby Thorpe Marsh Power Station opened in 1963. Today, Barnby Dun is a residential area with a mix of modern and older properties.

There are local shops, a primary school, and recreational facilities, such as a village hall and playing fields, in the area. The village is known for its friendly community and good transport links to nearby towns and cities, making it a popular choice for families and commuters.

The parish church of St Peter & St Paul is Grade I listed.

The village is located 21.3 miles (34.2 km) from Sheffield. The village has 3,362 inhabitants (2016). Barnby upon Don was a civil parish until 1921 when it became part of Barnby Dun with Kirk Sandall. The civil parish had 774 inhabitants in 1921.

== Geology ==
The bedrock on which Barnby Dun is built is primarily sedimentary and composed of sandstone and gravel. The village sits atop the Chester Formation, the bedrock of which was formed around 247.1 million years ago during the Olenekian age of the Triassic period. Its parent rock unit is the Sherwood Sandstone Group.

In the newer parts of the village to the east, River Terrace Deposits are found dating to the present Quaternary period, composed primarily of sand and gravel. Late Pleistocene alluvium deposits can be found in the far west of the village around the River Don Navigation canal, due to silt, clay and gravel deposition on the River Don floodplain.

In a few areas in the north of the village, Pleistocene Glaciofluvial Deposits can be found dating to between 860 and 116 thousand years ago, likely corresponding to the Middle Pleistocene Glacial Maximum of 140 thousand years ago. The village is bounded to the north and west by the Hemingbrough Glaciolacustrine Formation of the Devensian Stage, deposits of which can be found within the parish of Barnby Dun at Thorpe Marsh.

== History ==
=== Pre-Norman era (pre–1066) ===
Evidence of farming, upwards of 2,000 years ago, has been discovered in the north of Barnby Dun near Ling House, where a brickwork pattern field system was identified. One human cremation was also identified, potentially dating back further to the Bronze Age.

Before the arrival of the Normans in 1066, there are mentioned in the Domesday Book three landholders. These were Anglo-Saxon men named Ulfkil, Ketilbert and Oswulf, the first of whom was lord of the manor and held two taxed bovates. Ketilbert and Oswulf, however, both held nine bovates in the parish and a priest and church are named in the lands of Oswulf, constituting the first reference of a religious site in Barnby Dun.

In the Domesday Book, Barnby Dun is referred to as "Barnebi", highlighting the village's name as of Norse origin when part of the Danelaw. The most prominent explanation for its etymology pertains to a "village of the children", most likely referring to a settlement held jointly by multiple heirs. Some interpretations, however, claim the village's etymology links to being a boundary of the Forest of Barnsdale, an ancient forest (later royal forest) which may have once rivalled Sherwood Forest in area.

=== Post-Norman medieval period (1066–1453) ===
By 1086, upon the publication of the Domesday Book, the lands of Ulfkil and lordship of the manor had been granted to the Count of Mortain, comprising 18 bovates, while the lands of Ketilbert and Oswulf had been respectively granted to Roger of Bully and William de Percy, who each held nine bovates as their predecessors had. The latter's land was managed as lord by Mauger le Vavasour, who also held land near the present-day centre of Doncaster, and whose son of the same name was born in Barnby Dun.

In 1221, the first reference is made to a church leader of "St Peter in Barnebi", during a dispute between the monks of Roche Abbey and Hugh, parson of the church in Barnby Dun, who had been accused of interfering with the right of the monks to collect tithes of grain in the village. The outcome of the dispute, adjudicated by the Abbot of Selby and two priors in York, was that the monks would continue to collect tithes in Barnby Dun as long as payment of eleven pounds of incense were made to the church annually, and that an adequate area of land was cultivated by the monks.

In 1244, the second recorded church leader – Benedict – can be found as rector of the church of St Peter and St Paul, Barneby. Later on in the 13th century, likely during the term of rector William de la Ryvere, the original wooden structure of the church was replaced by the beginnings of the present-day limestone building, though many additions and alterations have been made throughout the intervening centuries.

During the 1221 dispute, one Hugh Folioth or Foliot is named, and it appears that throughout 13th century the Foliot family were landholders in Barnby Dun, including Richard Foliot who held one quarter of the village by 1292. Some five years later, in 1297, the manor of Barnby Dun is referenced as being held by Richard de Barnby and his family and other de Barnbys are referenced as potential lords in Barnby Dun around this time. In 1347, the widow of Frank de Barnby – Idonia – leased the manor of Barnby-upon-Don to Piere de Marchelay for the remainder of his life. Also in the 1340s, during the term of John de Barneby, the rectory of Barnby Dun was replaced by a vicarage. It remains as such to the present day.

The Poll Tax of 1379 records 108 households in Barnby Dun, here referred to as Barmby super Done, and the tax collected from the village totalled 36 shillings and three pence. The village's vicar at the time, John Prest, can be seen on the tax as Johannes Presteson, and many other surnames display the agrarian nature of the village and of the time. The church tower was constructed in 1450 during the vicariate of William Russel.

On 27 October 1452 occurred the rape and abduction of Joan Beaumont in the village of Thorpe in Balne, which lies in the parish of Barnby Dun. Joan, the widow of Sir Henry Beaumont (1411–1447), was abducted at high mass from the 12th-century chapel beside the manor house by a group of some forty men led by Edward Lancaster of Skipton – who raped, threatened and forcefully married her – and including John Paslewe [Pashley], a resident of Barnby Dun proper. Beaumont's servants, John Cooke and John Louth, were also assaulted and 100 shillings were stolen from the Beaumont estate. A petition was made to parliament in 1453 by Joan's son Henry and contracted husband Charles Nowell, Esq. which resulted in Lancaster's imprisonment and the reformation of marriage annulment laws to reduce the vulnerability of widowed women.

=== Portington family (1480–1798) ===
In 1480, John Portington was born in Barnby Dun, the son of Thomas Portington who himself was son of Robert Portington, who both lived in the village but had originally hailed from Portington, East Riding of Yorkshire. The 1480s mark the arrival of the Portington family, who would go on to become lords of the manor in Barnby Dun and be associated with the village for the best part of 300 years after their arrival.

By the end of the 16th century, the Portingtons had lived in Barnby Dun for over a century and had been involved in land disputes through the 16th century, including the seizure of tithe payment to the parsonage in Hatfield in the 1530s. In the 1530s and 40s, Lionel Portington and Thomas Hungate were involved in disputes over the manor of Barnby Dun and Hungate was leased part of the manor by Mary I in 1553. A similar set of manors including Barnby Dun were in 1581 leased by Elizabeth I to Thomas Heneage.

The manor of Barnby Dun by the late 16th century mostly belonged to the Blyth family. Throughout the 1580s and 90s, John Blyth, William Blyth and Anthony Blyth – who also owned part of the manor of Quarmby – were involved in a series of conveyances and indentures primarily including the Kaye family, William West, John Farrar, Edward Bathecombe and Roger Gregory – of the prominent and ancient Gregory family – which resulted in a complicated moiety comprising several lords.

Parish records at Barnby Dun's church of St Peter and St Paul began in 1599.

Approach boldly, reader, whosoe’er thou art, if an honest man and one who follows the King, but if less than that depart, lest unknowingly, and by chance, thou shouldst press with thy heel these pious ashes, for Roger Portington’s bones lying beneath can ill bear a rebel’s foot. A man of ancient lineage and faithful to his chief illustrious, broken down by plunder and imprisonment, weary of years, as it were heavy with sleep, has gone to sleep, awaiting the morn of resurrection with Jane his wife, till the last trumpet shall sound.

— 17th-century memorial to Roger Portington, Church of St Peter and St Paul, Barnby Dun (translated from original Latin)

In 1637, Charles I granted – among other lands and tenements – free rents and tenancies in Barnby Dun to his third cousin The Earl of Lennox, which may have pre-emptively evidenced a strong royalist sentiment on behalf of the most senior Portington and lord at the time, Roger Portington. Thus, at the outbreak of the English Civil War in the 1640s, Portington enlisted as a Lieutenant-Colonel and fought for his monarch but was taken prisoner for 16 years in Hull, his commitment being remembered after his liberation in 1660 on a 17th-century memorial which remains to the present day in Barnby Dun's church.

Seemingly as a result of his service to the royalist cause, by 1673 Portington – now in his seventh decade – was solely referred to as the lord of the manor of Barnby Dun. He died in late 1683 and the manor passed to his eldest son, also named Roger. The Portingtons remained as lords of the manor until the death of his grandson, a fourth Roger Portington, on 13 May 1751. The last remaining Portington in Barnby Dun was Ann Portington, sister of the final Roger Portington, who in November 1793 aged 73 was declared a lunatic. She died in January 1798.

=== Arrival of industry (1730–2012) ===
After significant deliberation in the 1720s, the passage of the River Dun Navigation Act 1725 (12 Geo. 1. c. 38) and River Dun Navigation Act 1726 (13 Geo. 1. c. 20) and later disagreements in the early 1730s, a cut was made for the construction of the River Dun Navigation canal, and a lock and flood banks were constructed at Barnby Dun.

Barnby Dun Inclosure Act 1766
- Act of Parliament
- Parliament of Great Britain
- Long title: An Act for enclosing and dividing a Common, called Thorpe Marsh, and a Piece of Land called Grumble Hirst, within the Parish of Barmby upon Dunn, in the County of York.
- Citation: 6 Geo. 3. c. 72 Pr.
- Territorial extent: Great Britain

Dates
- Royal assent: 14 May 1766
- Commencement: 17 December 1765 (Note: Start of session.)

Status: Current legislation

In 1766, Thorpe Marsh and Grumble Hurst – both lands in the parish of Barnby Dun, though parts of Grumble Hurst lied in the parish of Arksey – were enclosed by the Barnby Dun Inclosure Act 1766 (6 Geo. 3. c. 72 Pr.). The enclosure award was granted two years later. Barnby Dun would itself later be enclosed in 1803, the award being granted in 1808.

On 10 July 1798, a 29-year-old James Bruce, fifth son of the 5th Earl of Elgin and former Member of Parliament for Marlborough, was drowned in the River Don while attempting to cross at Barnby Dun on horseback.

The following year, flooding was mentioned at the River Don in Barnby Dun. In 1822, the population of the village was 495, excluding an additional population of 122 in Thorpe in Balne, of the same parish. There was also recorded one house in an area of the parish known as Reedholme, which was ruined by 1849. Reedholme and the ruins of Reedholme House are now part of Thorpe Marsh Nature Reserve.

By the early 1820s, plans were being produced for the construction of a railway which would pass through Barnby Dun. The original South Yorkshire Railway opened in 1849, but did not pass through Barnby Dun until 1856 when a line along the River Dun Navigation was created between Doncaster and Thorne. The line was opened on 7 July 1856, along with the first railway station in Barnby Dun.

In 1860, prominent landowner George Frederick Milnthorp – who also held part of the manor alongside Richard Heptonstall and one Mr. Ross in 1881 – built the first of three malt kilns in the village, located near to the boundary with Kirk Sandall. This represented one of the first shifts in employment opportunity after the agricultural era for residents of Barnby Dun.

The West Riding and Grimsby Railway opened in 1866, intersecting the north of Barnby Dun. This railway line is now crossable in the parish at Applehurst Lane (private), Thorpe Road, Bramwith Road and Stainforth Road.

Although schools had been mentioned in Barnby Dun throughout the 19th century, the first official school opened in the village came in 1871 by the vicar of the time, John Duffin. The first headmaster was Charles Newbound. Also in 1871, the population of the parish was recorded as 484. Duffin, who had studied at St John's College, Cambridge, became the longest serving church leader on record at St Peter and St Paul by 1890, and he died on 3 April 1906 at the age of 80, having served as vicar in Barnby Dun for 50 years. During his term, in 1887, the number of bells in the church were increased to six.

Barnby Dun's methodist church records began in 1875.

In 1909, a pipe organ was installed in the church by Norman & Beard, which was given by George Frederick Milnthorp and Andrew Carnegie of Skibo Castle. It replaced an earlier 1862 organ by Samuel Meacock (1826–1903), given by John Henry Newsome, who had also given to the church a stained glass window to the memory of his father, James Newsome, his mother and his elder brother. Milnthorp died on 5 May 1923 aged 81 after having sold much of his land on the boundary with Kirk Sandall to Pilkington's Glass Works.

Sandhurst was built on Station Road by Samuel Porter in 1910 alongside significant sand and gravel workings in the area and near Park Hill around the same time. The Star Inn, originally located closer to the canal, was rebuilt opposite Ramper Lane by architect Harry Armitage Hickson in the early 1920s.

The construction of Thorpe Marsh Power Station began in 1959 and the station opened in 1963, providing a new, significant opportunity for employment in Barnby Dun. Four workmen were accidentally killed at Thorpe Marsh on 7 January 1973, and a memorial stone was placed by the site of the power station. It has since been relocated to the church of St Peter and St Paul.

It was announced on 8 June 1993 that Thorpe Marsh Power Station would be closing following the privatisation and dissolution of the Central Electricity Generating Board in 1991. The station closed in 1994 and its six cooling towers were progressively demolished on 1 April 10 June, 5 and 19 August 2012. No explosives were used to protect the River Don, and bulldozers were used instead.

=== Recent history (1967–present) ===
On 4 September 1967, Barnby Dun railway station was closed and later demolished in July 2008.

The Old Manor House at Barnby Dun was demolished in 1969 and its surrounding land replaced by a housing estate.

Thorpe Marsh Nature Reserve, on the ancient pasture and marshland site adjacent to Thorpe Marsh Power Station, was opened on 16 May 1980. It is now managed by Yorkshire Wildlife Trust, while the banks of Thorpe Marsh Drain are maintained by the Environment Agency.

In 1982, the old wooden swing bridge across the River Dun Navigation canal connecting Madam Lane and Fordstead Lane was demolished and replaced by a new bascule bridge which remains to the present day.

In 1994, Barnby Dun Old School closed and was replaced by Barnby Dun Primary Academy. The Old School was reopened in July 2005 as a community centre, and the site is leased to local businesses.

Large housing developments were undertaken in the east of Barnby Dun in 2000, followed by further plans to develop housing on a 27.7-acre site north of Hatfield Lane in 2019. The construction of 166 houses were proposed by Stonebridge Homes, though such plans are yet to come to fruition.

== Transport ==
Boats are used on the canal and River Don. Barnby Dun railway station operated here until its closure. Kirk Sandall railway station still operates close by.

== Education ==
Barnby Dun Primary School is here. Arksey School is in the neighbouring village of Arksey.

== See also ==
- Listed buildings in Barnby Dun with Kirk Sandall
