= St. Sepulchre's Palace =

Oldest surviving mansion in Dublin

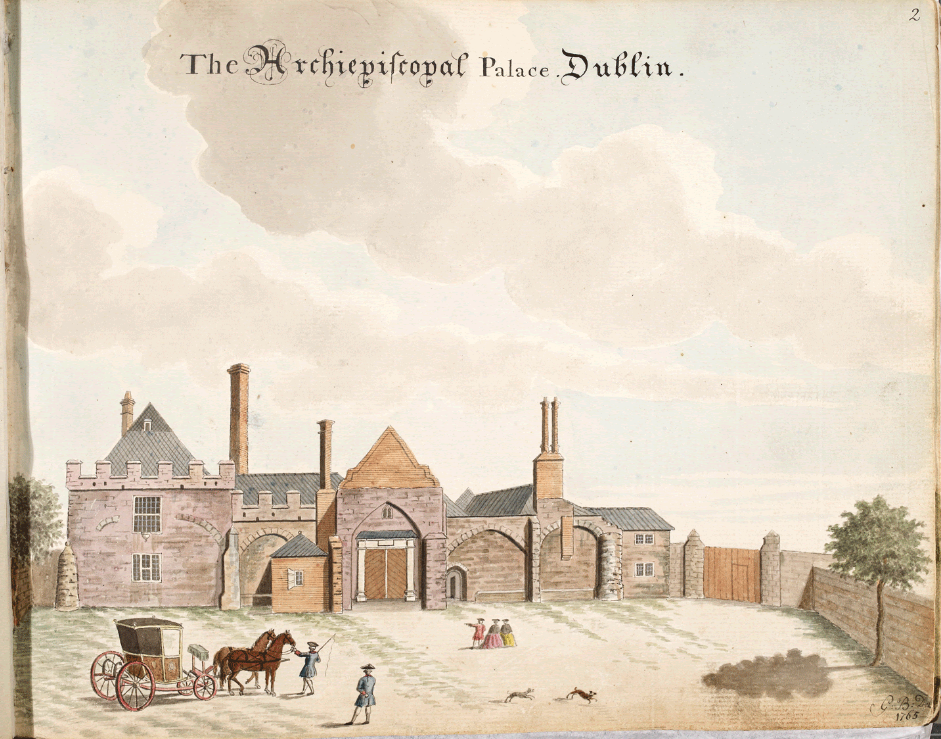
- St Sepulchre's palace from an illustration by Gabriel Beranger in 1765.
- Alternative names: Archishop's Palace, Kevin Street Episcopal Palace, Old Kevin Street Garda Station

General information
- Location: Kevin Street and Bride Street
- Coordinates: 53.3388°N 6.2701°W
- Current tenants: Garda Síochána
- Construction started: c. 1170
- Owner: Dublin City Council

St. Sepulchre's Palace is a 12th-century building complex incorporating an archbishop's palace in the The Liberties area of Dublin, Ireland. It was built around 1170–1184 by John Comyn, the first Anglo-Norman Archbishop of Dublin, and served as the official residence of the Archbishops of Dublin (Catholic then Protestant after the Reformation) for most of the time until 1806.

It is one of the few structures in the city to have been continuously occupied since the Norman period and one of the oldest surviving structures in Dublin. Most parts of the palace are still preserved to this day. The buildings and surrounding area are not accessible to the public and are currently used by a specialised unit of the Garda Síochána.

== Location ==
It is located at the corner of Bride Street and Kevin Street adjacent to Marsh's Library. While it served as the headquarters of the city manor and of the wider St. Sepulchre manorial administration, the main palace buildings are currently not accessible to visitors or to the general public.

== Early history ==
=== Foundation and naming ===
Before the palace was built, the archbishops of Dublin already held a residence near Christ Church. Under Archbishop Lawrence O'Toole, the constitution of Christ Church was changed in 1163 from a secular order to a regular order of Arroasian canons. The palace was built by John Comyn, a Benedictine monk from Evesham with a reputation as a learned judge, diplomat and administrator. Comyn was appointed for political rather than religious reasons, the Normans having recently gained control of Dublin as Henry II sought to extend royal influence over the Irish church. A deacon at the time of his appointment, he was not ordained a priest until 1181, shortly after which he was consecrated bishop and enthroned as Archbishop of Dublin. Between 1181 and 1189 he was granted lands for the See of Dublin by the monarchy; he made a brief visit to the city in 1184 in the company of Prince John, heir to the English throne, before settling in Dublin in 1185.

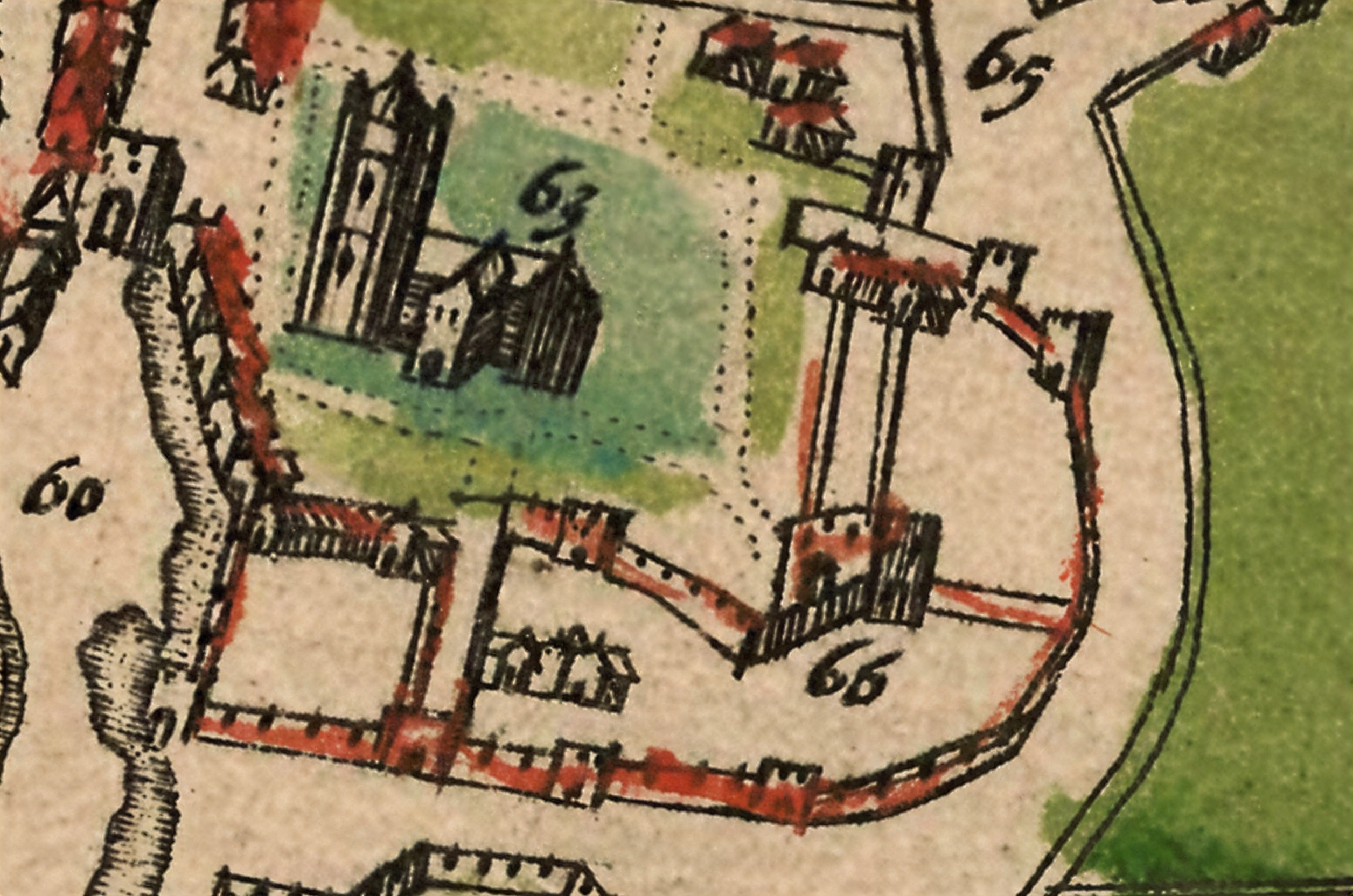
Part of John Speed's Map of Dublin showing St. Sepulchre's Palace marked as location number 66 (1610)

=== Construction ===
The name of the palace was suggested by the campaigns being waged by the Crusaders for the recovery of the Holy Sepulchre from the Muslims. Comyn was granted land by the monarchy for the See of Dublin, which provided the basis for the manor. This palace remained the seat of the Archbishops of Dublin until 1806. It then became a police station.

The first historical mention of the palace dates from 1216. In 1316 the buildings were burned by the troops of Edward Bruce during his campaign against Dublin, and a contemporary account of 1326 described the palace as having a stone hall badly roofed with shingles, an annexed chamber, a kitchen and a chapel. The buildings were repaired and extended in 1523 by Hugh Inge, archbishop from 1521 to 1528, after which the palace became a desirable residence. Narcissus Marsh oversaw the building of the adjoining Marsh's Library, originally part of the complex.

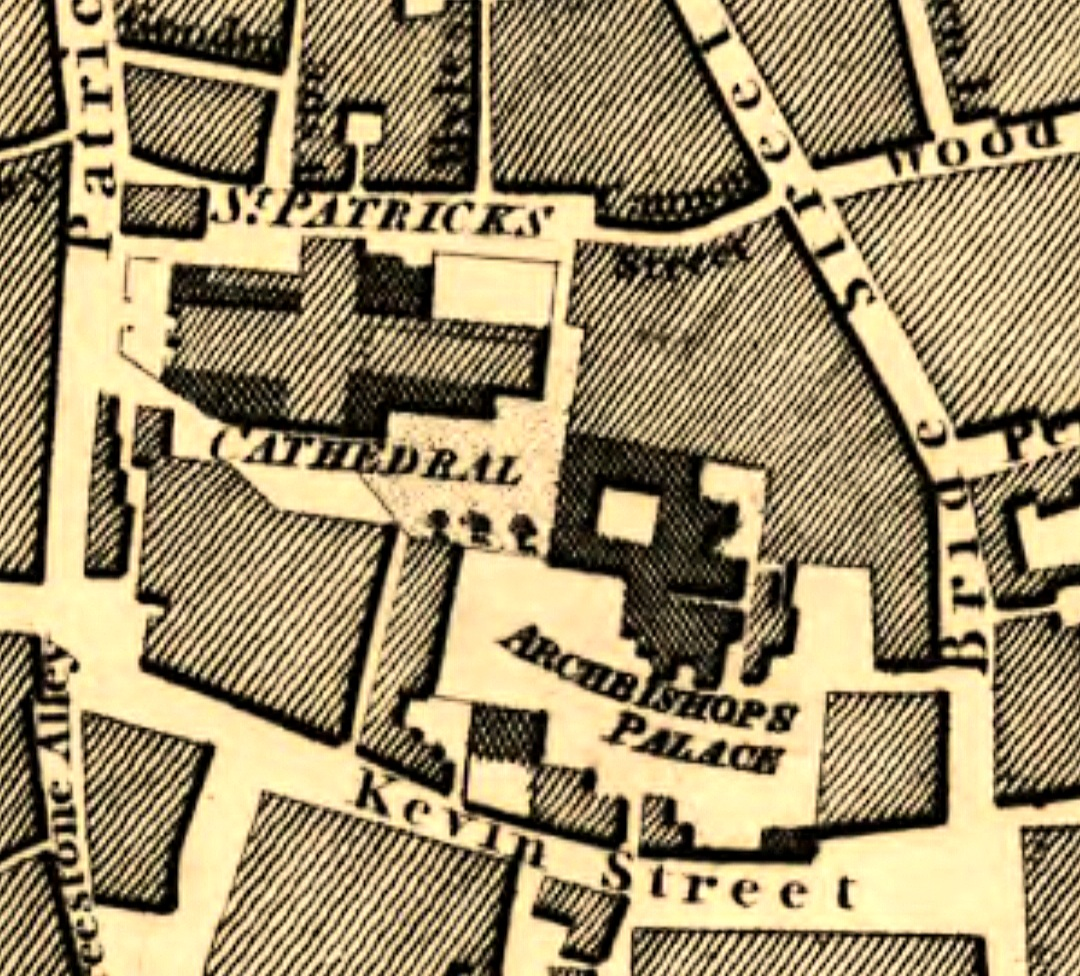
Dublin Map showing the Archbishops Palace (1797)

=== Residence of the Archbishops (1185-1806) ===
In April 1619, Archbishop Thomas Jones died at the palace. By the late 17th century, the palace outbuildings were replaced by brick houses along the street frontage, built by Dutch immigrants escaping religious persecution.

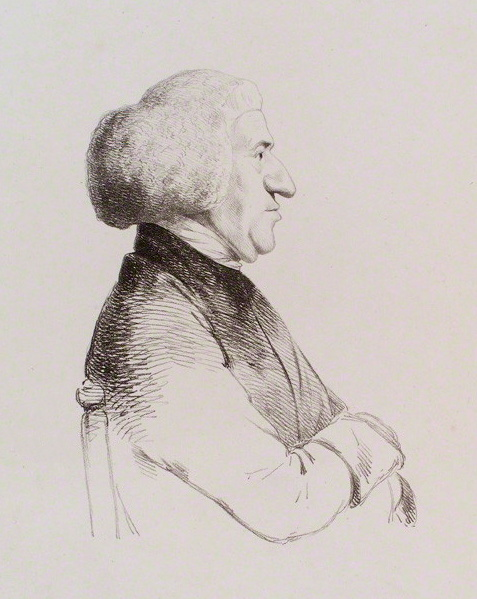
The last Archbishop of Dublin who lived at the palace, Charles Agar (1809)

Between 41 and 43 archbishops lived in the palace over six centuries. Archbishop Charles Cobbe died there in 1765. Following the Archbishop's Palace Dublin Act 1804, the premises were vested in the Crown; the last archbishop to occupy it, Charles Agar, Earl of Normanton, moved his residence to 16 St Stephen's Green in 1806, by which time the surrounding Liberties had declined into a slum. The 1804 Act directed that the purchase money be applied to acquiring ground for a new residence for the archbishop and a courthouse for the seneschal of the Liberty of St. Sepulchre's. Writing in 1806, the traveller John Carr remarked that the former palace had been converted into barracks and stood amid surroundings he considered more wretched than the poorest quarters of London.

=== Aleyn's Hospital (c. 1500) ===
Archbishop Walter FitzSimons granted a vacant site between the palace of St. Sepulchre and Kevin Street for a stone house for ten poor men c.1500. On 18 June 1504, John Aleyn, dean of St. Patrick's, founded a hospital on this land intended for the sick poor of Dublin and Meath dioceses. The hospital survived suppression and was maintained as an almshouse into the later sixteenth century.

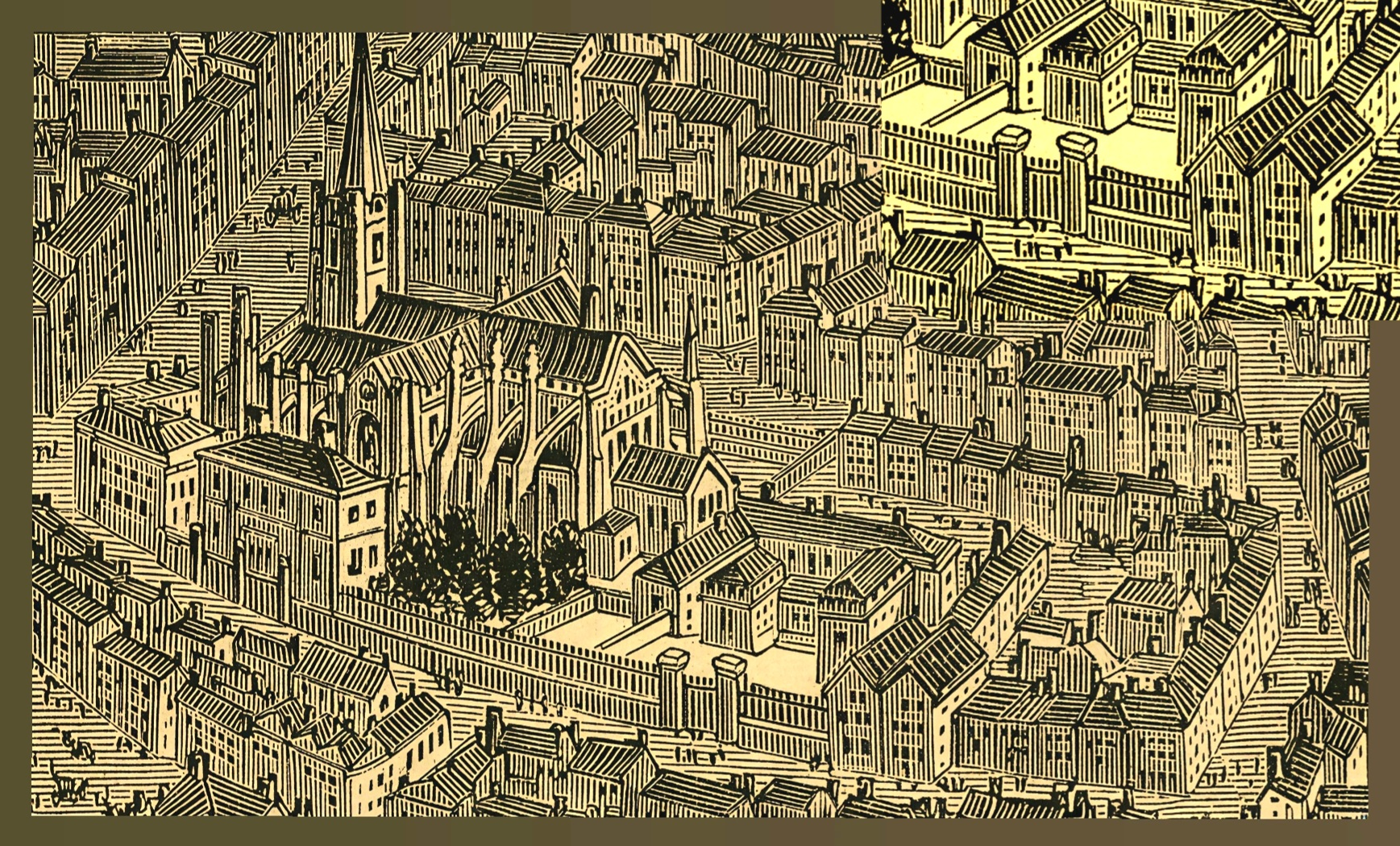
The palace as represented in SMYTH's bird-eye view engraving of Dublin (1846)

=== St. Sepulchre's Library (1707-present) ===
St. Sepulchre's Library, better known as Marsh's Library today, is a rare example of an intact 18th-century library still in use for its original purpose which was originally built as an integrated part of the palace demesne. Founded in 1707 by Archbishop Narcissus Marsh on the land of St. Sepulchre's Palace, adjacent to St. Patrick's Cathedral, it was the first public library in Ireland. Designed by Sir William Robinson, the library opened with Marsh's personal collection of over 10,000 volumes, supplemented by donations from the first keeper, Dr. Elias Bouhereau, and subsequent benefactors.

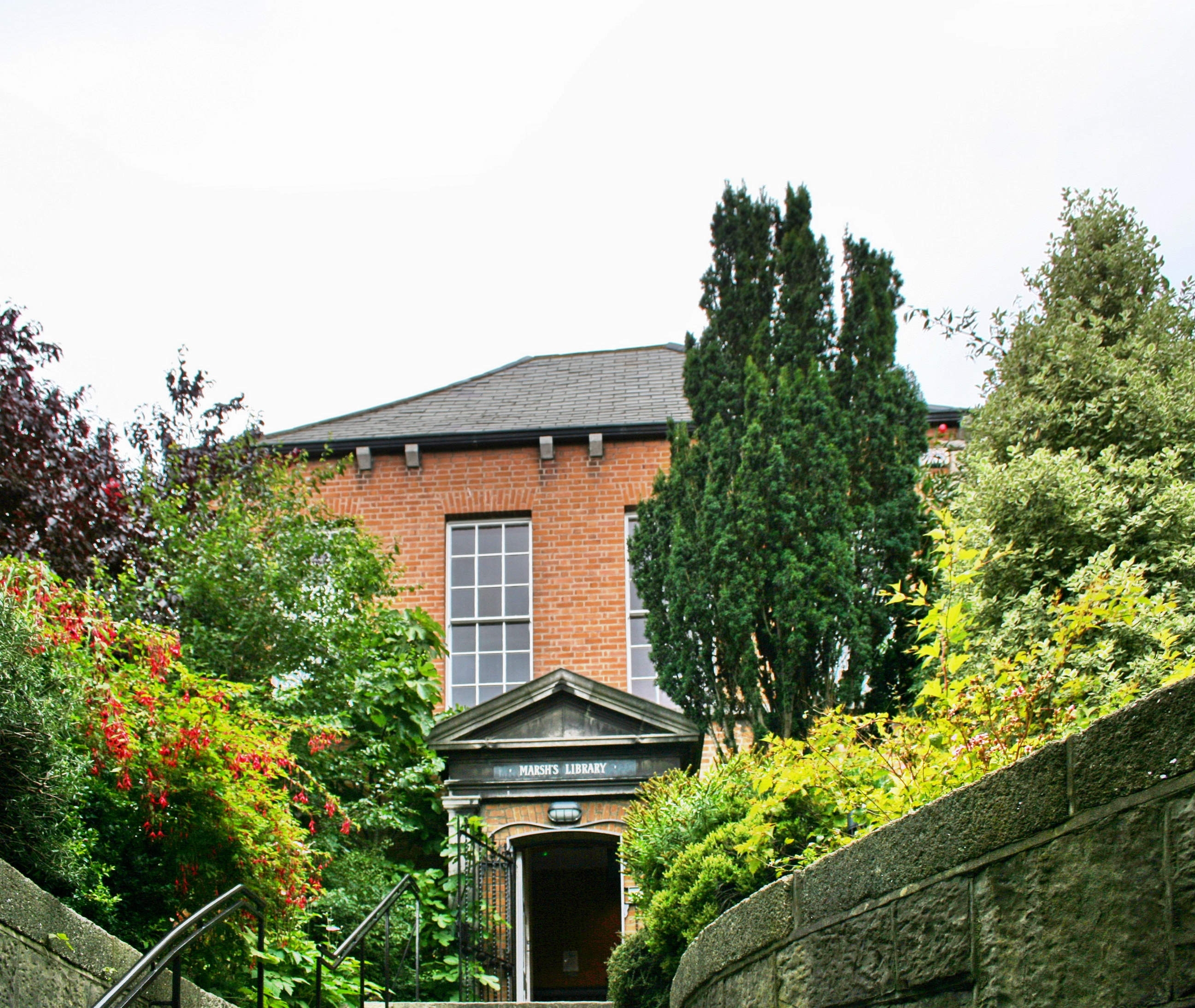
St. Sepulchre's Library known as Marsh´s Library (2007)

The collection of approximately 26,000 books and 300 manuscripts reflects the intellectual concerns of the Renaissance and Enlightenment periods, with particular strengths in theology, law, medicine, science, and classical literature. Notable holdings include 80 incunabula (books printed before 1501), important collections of Hebrew and Judaica texts, French historical works, and Irish manuscripts acquired from Dudley Loftus in 1695. The library's architectural features—including original oak bookcases, wire "cages" installed to prevent theft, and evidence of bullet holes from the Easter Rising—preserve a tangible record of its long history.

Since its foundation, the library is overseen by the Governors and Guardians of the Library, Marsh's Library remains open to scholars and tourists alike, maintaining its role as a functioning research library and cultural institution in Dublin.

=== Barracks, courthouse and jail (1804-1836) ===
In 1804 the British Crown gained ownership and control over the premises. A courthouse and gaol for the use as part of the complex were built in the early 19th century near the palace at the corner of Long Lane and Bride Street.

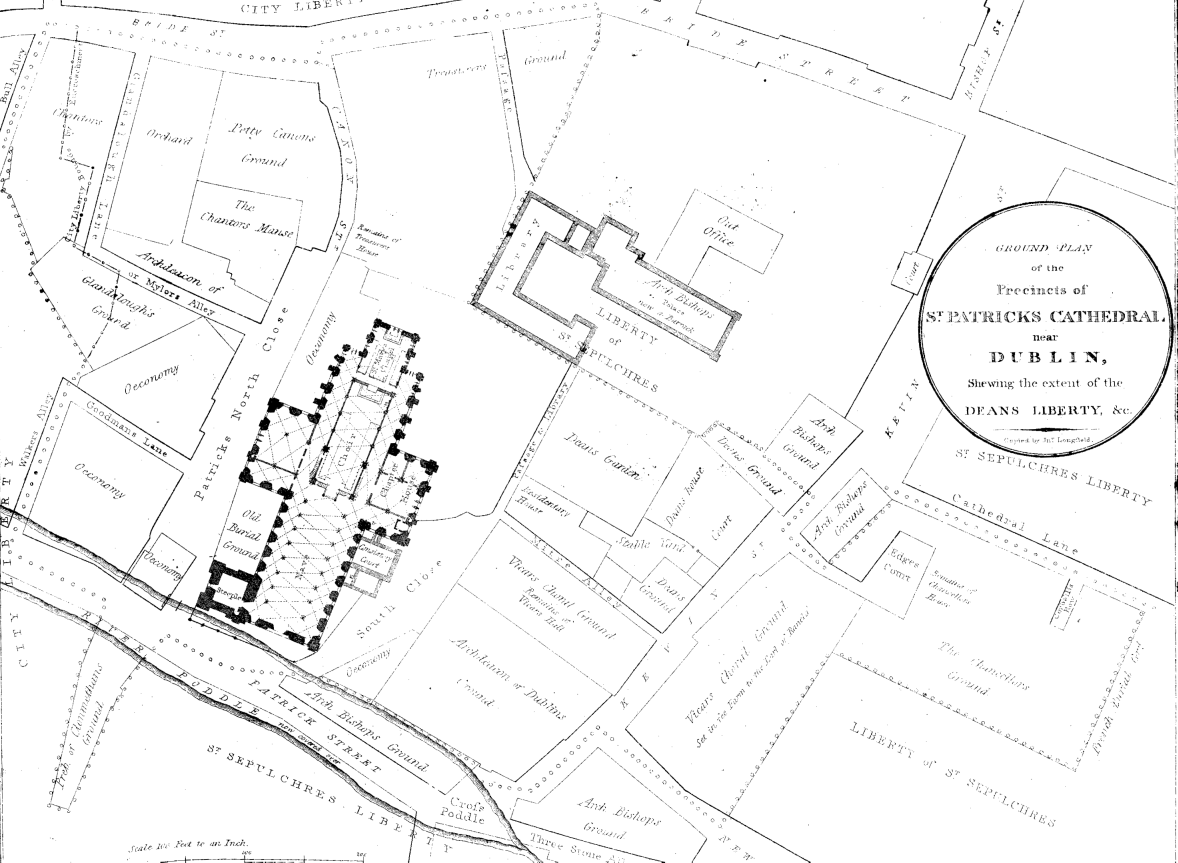
Plan of St. Patrick's cathedral also showing the palace and its surrounding buildings (1876)

Most of the prisoners were said to be insolvent debtors. The court predominantly dealt with trading, fairs, weights and measures matters. Attending court was difficult for those residents living completely outside the city, in Swords, Lusk or elsewhere, most of whom were quite poor. The same difficulty applied to jurors, who were fined for not attending court when summoned. A court as well as a jail had already been operating in earlier times when the palace was still occupied by the Archbishops as demonstrated by excavations on the adjoining sites. These uncovered a severed head buried about three metres below ground level, consistent with the medieval practice of displaying the remains of the executed as a warning, alongside French, German and Dublin earthenware of the medieval period. Military barracks were developed by the British Crown for a later use by the Mounted Police.

== Police station ==
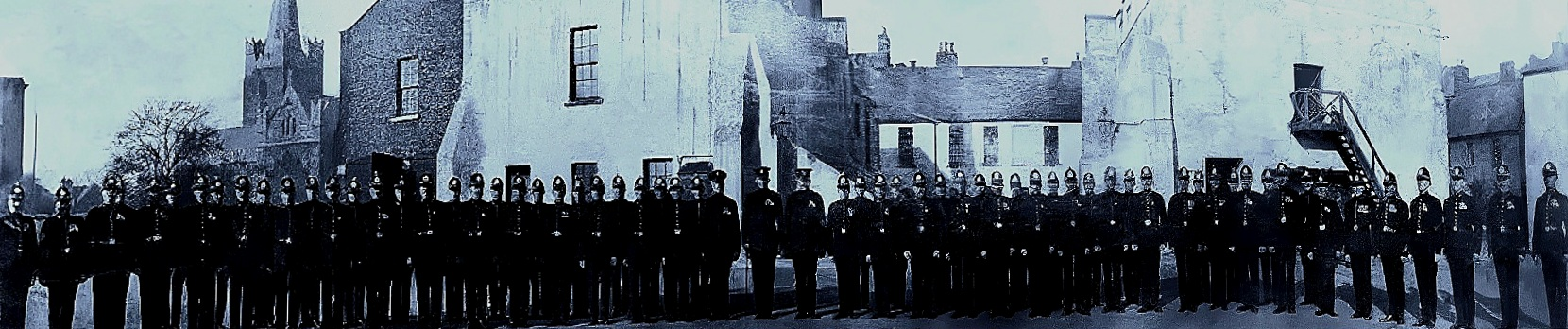
The Dublin Metropolitan Police at St. Sepulchre's Palace (1922)

=== Dublin Metropolitan Police (1836-1925) ===
The former palace was given to the Dublin Metropolitan Police and used as a barracks, becoming the force's headquarters. In its earlier role the archbishop also acted as a judge, and executions were carried out at the site, the bodies reportedly dropped into a deep well that drained into the River Poddle. Rings to which horses were once tethered survive on the external walls, and a set of ornate doors said to have originated in France remained in place into the building's final years as a station.

=== The Kevin street station of the Garda Síochána (1925-present) ===
In 1925, Kevin Street Garda Station was occupying the palace buildings. The keys had been handed over to the newly formed Irish Free State. The premises remained a station of the Garda Síochána following the foundation of the state. Kevin Street was the longest operational Garda station in the country when it closed in May 2018, its functions transferring to a new building next door. The old station buildings had been in continuous police use for more than 200 years.

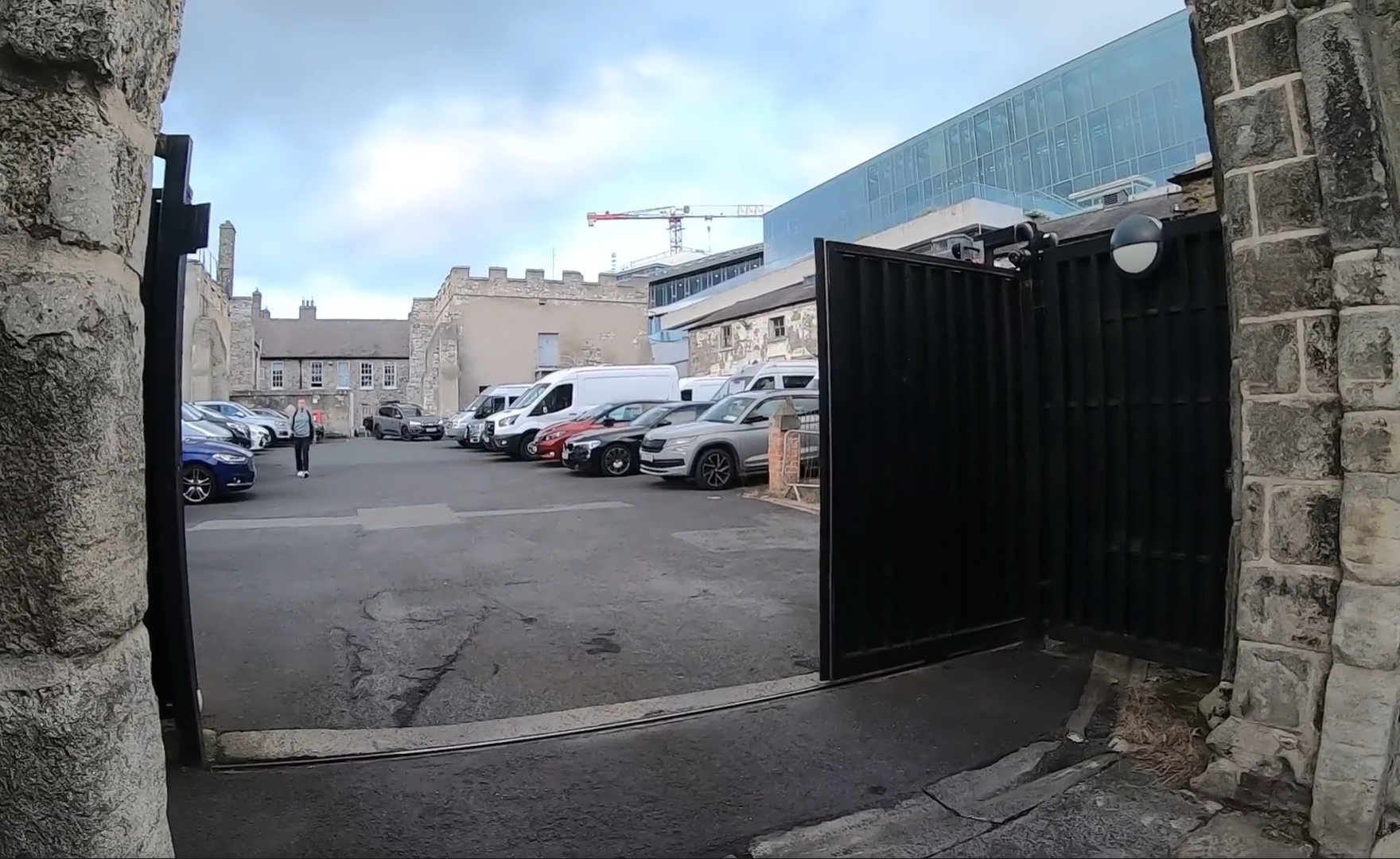
Garda Síochána premises within the old St. Sepulchre's Palace (2024)

Large-scale building works for the replacement Garda Divisional Headquarters began on 19 February 2015 on the adjoining Bride Street site, with a contract value of about €31 million awarded to J. J. Rhatigan, whose published programme ran from February 2015 to July 2017. The new headquarters provided some 6,840 square metres of floor space, including a double basement designed to accommodate underground parking; the demolished buildings were later additions made after the police took over the palace rather than part of the original archiepiscopal complex. In 2019, the OPW completed the new contemporary Divisional Headquarters on the site. This was followed by the opening of the Walter Scott House facility in November 2022, which allowed for the relocation of several specialised units. The OPW has stated its intention to identify a "suitable heritage purpose" for the medieval palace fabric once its temporary use by police concludes. The proposals for the future use of the building included its incorporation into a Jonathan Swift tourist trail, advanced by Jason McElligott, keeper of the neighbouring Marsh's Library, on the basis of Swift's associations with the area as dean of nearby St. Patrick's Cathedral. The Dublin Civic Trust has also suggested a civic museum, knitting the building together with St. Patrick's Cathedral and Marsh's Library as a cultural precinct. Archaeological survey work carried out by the OPW in the interim recorded surviving medieval walls and deposits, together with damage caused by earlier, archaeologically unsupervised pipe-laying.

== Architecture ==
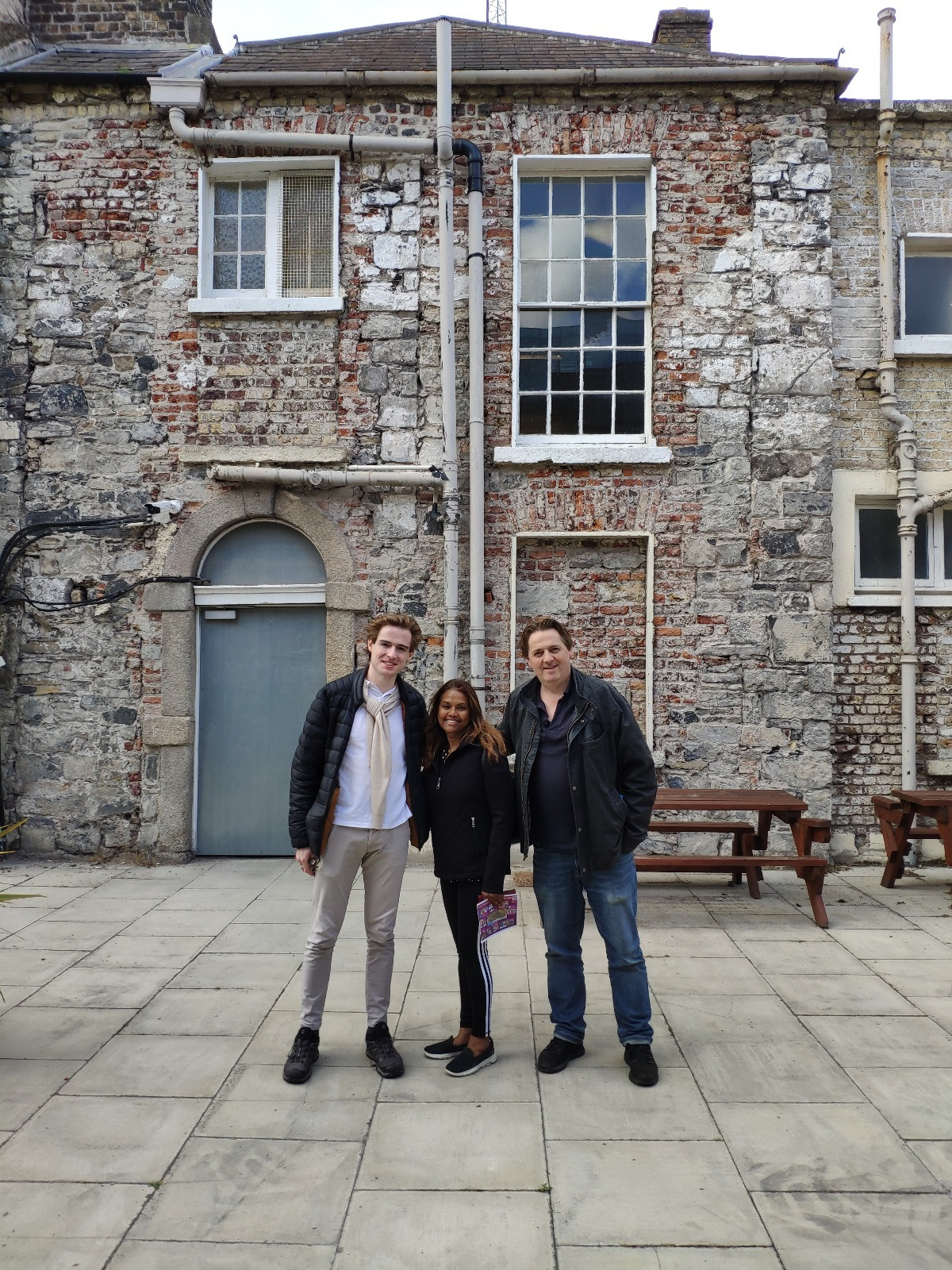
Surviving buildings of the palace (2024)

The west range includes a tower at its northwest corner and three groin-vaulted cellars in which traces of the wickerwork centring used during their construction remain visible. Its features include an early-16th-century moulded limestone doorway, a finely executed late-17th-century carved doorcase, and an 18th-century Gibbsian doorway. A moulded limestone plaque bears a sculpted coat-of-arms with the Latin motto Virtus Nobilitat and the date 1723, while interior features include an 18th-century staircase, medieval roof corbels and 19th-century quarry-tiled floors.

The buildings are rated of national importance and carry archaeological, architectural, artistic, historical and social special-interest categories on the National Inventory of Architectural Heritage, which dates the fabric to the period 1180–1705. The north range is the most regular of the structure, presenting seven bays to its front, while the west range is the most irregular; stepped clasping buttresses with evidence of a base batter mark the front corners of the east and west ranges. A lantern above the former carriage-arches on the west range bears the lettering "Police Station".

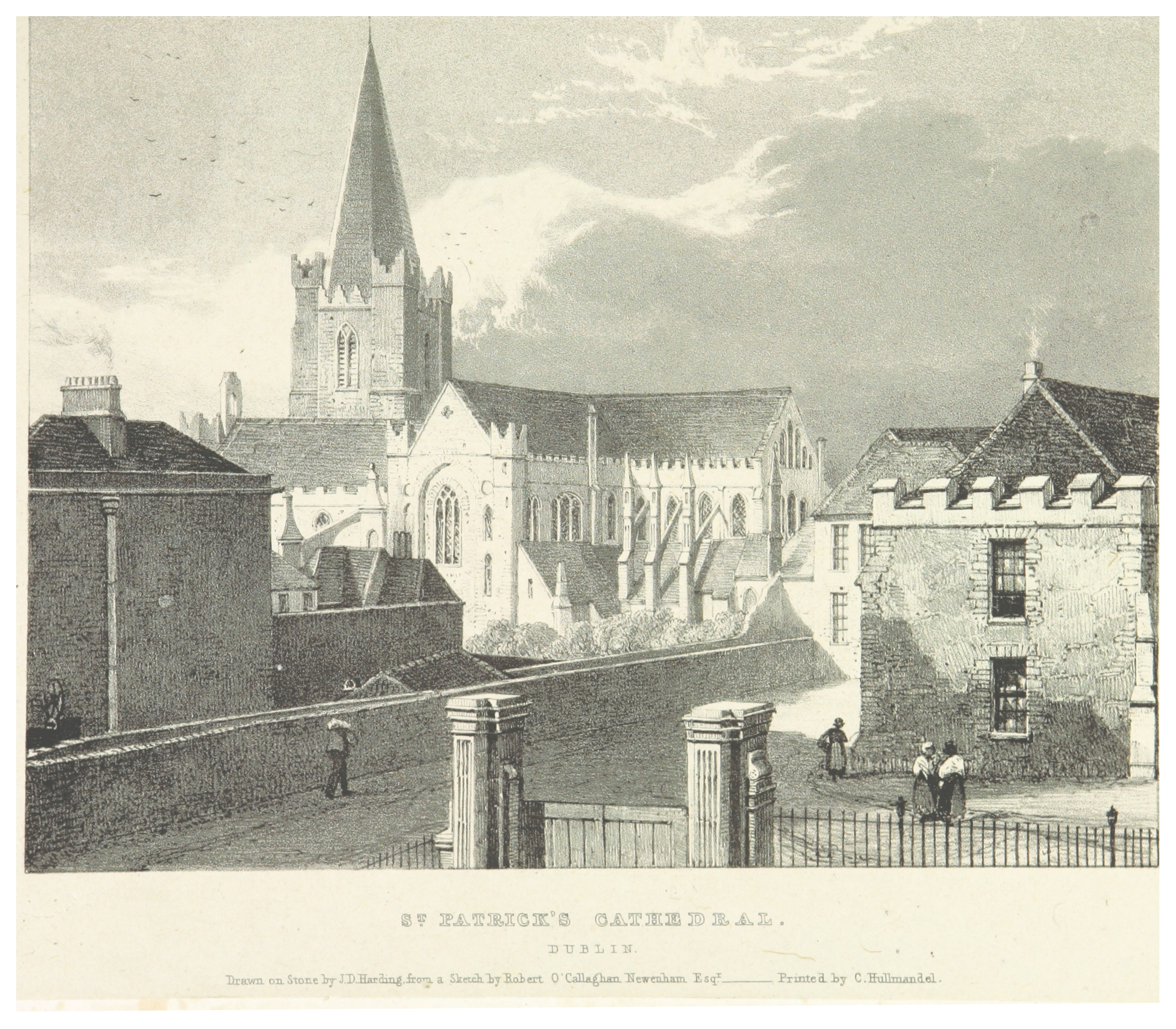
Engraving of part of the palace (right) with St. Patrick's Cathedral (left) (1830)

Early depictions of the palace include a detailed watercolour illustration by Gabriel Beranger from 1765. It shows the building with unusually tall chimney-stacks (totaled 29 as described in 1792), a decorated gable above the doorway and a small sentry box. Among the chimney-stacks, are red brick ones, positioned laterally along the long elevations of the west and east ranges, indicating successive phases of modification to the complex over several centuries.

Another structure, the Archbishop's Pillory, was located within the precinct of St. Sepulchre's Palace, near the entrance gates to Kevin Street Garda Barracks.

In 1825, the builder Patrick Byrne was employed to construct gate piers and erect railings around the compound which form the border as of 2024. The two large gate-posts at the entrance have been dated to around 1720.

== Notable individuals ==
=== Archbishops who lived within - or oversaw the palace premises ===
- John Comyn (1181–1212), cited as having commissioned the initial palace ✟
- Henry de Loundres (1213–1228) ✟
- Luke (1230–1255) ✟
- Fulk Basset (1256–1271) ✟
- John de Derlington (1279–1284) ✟
- John de Sandford (1286–1294) ✟
- Thomas de Chaddesworth (1295–1299) ✟
- William Houghton (1296–1298) ✟
- Richard de Ferings (1299–1306) ✟
- Richard de Havering (1307–1310) ✟
- John de Leche (1311–1313) ✟
- Alexander de Bicknor (1317–1349) ✟
- John de St Paul (1349–1362) ✟
- Thomas Minot (1363–1375) ✟
- Robert Wikeford (1375–1390) ✟
- Robert Waldby (1390–1395) ✟
- Richard Northalis (1395–1397) ✟
- Thomas Cranley (1397–1417) ✟
- Richard Talbot (1417–1449) ✟
- Michael Tregury (1449–1471) ✟
- John Walton (1472–1484) ✟
- Walter Fitzsimon (1484–1511), opened Aleyn's Hospital within the palace premises ✟
- William Rokeby (1512–1521) ✟
- Hugh Inge (1523–1528) ✟
- John Alen (1529–1534) ✟
- George Browne (1536–1554), first post-Reformation Archbishop at the palace ✞
- Hugh Curwen (1555–1567) ✟ ✞
- Adam Loftus (1567–1605), first Provost of Trinity College Dublin, died at the palace ✞
- Thomas Jones (1605–1619), died at the palace✞
- Lancelot Bulkeley (1619–1650) ✞
- James Margetson (1661–1663) ✞
- Michael Boyle (1663–1679) ✞
- John Parker (1679–1681) ✞
- Francis Marsh (1682–1693) ✞
- Narcissus Marsh (1694–1703), established the Marsh's Library formerly known as St. Sepulchre's Library on the palace estate ✞
- William King (1703–1729), died at the palace ✞
- John Hoadly (1730–1742) ✞
- Charles Cobbe (1743–1765), died at the palace ✞
- William Carmichael (1765) ✞
- Arthur Smyth (1766–1771) ✞
- John Cradock (1772–1778) ✞
- Robert Fowler (1779–1801) ✞
- Charles Agar (1801–1806) ✞

✟: Catholic; ✞: Protestant; (dates-) refer to their time acting as Archbishop while the palace was logically under their control.

=== Lord Deputy of Ireland ===
- Walter Fitzsimon in addition to holding the office of the Archbishop was also Lord Deputy between 1492-1493

St. Sepulchre's Palace was requisitioned at multiple occasions by Lords Deputy for a brief period of time:

- Thomas Radclyffe, 3rd Earl of Sussex in 1558
- Sir Henry Sidney
- Other Lords Deputy/Justice during the reigns of Henry VIII, Edward VI, Mary I, and Elizabeth I

=== Prisoners held ===
During its use as a police station the building held a number of well-known prisoners, among them:

- John Gilligan
- Tony Felloni
- Individuals connected to the later Hutch–Kinahan feud
- Fat Freddie Thompson
- Fenian prisoners
- Other individuals related to the Kinahan Organised Crime Group such as Gareth Brophy

=== Modern days ===
==== Notable individuals posted at Kevin Street Garda station ====
- James "Lugs" Branigan, well-known Irish boxer and member of Garda at Kevin Street station
- Deputy Commissioner John Twomey, famous for his investigations on the Kinahans

== Archaeology ==
Archaeological excavations at the corner of Kevin Street and Bride Street identified the main standing structure of the former Garda station as the medieval palace of St. Sepulchre, with the western wing of its quadrangular walled precinct found largely intact within the existing buildings. Excavations in 2007–2008 found the area had been laid out in rural property plots by the late 12th century, with timber-lined cesspits and a kiln possibly associated with metalworking; the archiepiscopal precinct was subsequently enclosed within a defensive ditch, recut on several occasions through the 13th and 14th centuries. One pit contained a stone setting covered by a wattle mat bearing the skull of a young man (aged 17–25) with apparent sword wounds, placed alongside the intact skeleton of a dog.

Danielle O'Donovan's structural analysis confirmed that the medieval quadrangle survives substantially within the existing buildings, the western range being particularly well-preserved. The complex originally contained a great hall, private chamber, chapel and possibly two towers, one sited near Marsh's Library. The south-west structure (officers' mess) was originally a tower, evidenced by abnormally thick walls and internal stone corbels for roof support; the western facade retains a doorway inserted by Archbishop Hugh Inge (1521–1528).

The preliminary assessment in June 2004 and supplementary evaluation trenches with monitoring from September to December 2007 involved test-trenches, excavation of service conduits, engineering test-pits and boreholes. Settlement patterns from the late 12th century demonstrated property divisions marked by ditches in a rural landscape. Two medieval wells in the southern area yielded substantial ceramic assemblages, including a complete 13th-century jug. A curving metalled roadway at the site's southern end represents the original medieval alignment of Kevin Street and Bride Street. The post-medieval phase included at least two large timber structures erected from imported spruce lumber, along with brick Dutch Billy buildings constructed by Dutch settlers escaping religious persecution in the late 17th century. Three barrel-vaulted cellars with surviving wickerwork centring were identified within the standing buildings.

Archaeological survey works commissioned by the Office of Public Works between the station's closure and any future reuse recorded surviving medieval walls and deposits beneath the courtyard, along with pottery sherds, floor and roof tile fragments, decorative plaster, part of a 17th-century wine glass, and four fragments of Dundry stone — a material used in Ireland from the 12th century onward. The survey also documented damage from earlier unsupervised pipe-laying, and concluded that further excavation to expose and display the medieval great hall and kitchens would be merited.
