= Nicholas Queytrot =

Mayor of Dublin, Ireland

Nicholas Queytrot (t) (c. 1475 – c. 1550), also called Nicholas Greytrot or Nicholas Coitrotte, was a wealthy merchant and citizen of Dublin city in the sixteenth century, who served one term as Mayor of Dublin from 1523 to 1524.

He is first heard of in the spring of 1504, when the Dublin city fathers employed him to build a flight of stairs leading up to the City Assembly Rooms. His business affairs prospered: in the 1520s he held 30 acres of land at Ballimo, County Dublin, jointly with William More. In 1537 he took a lease for 41 years of a property at Dame's-gate (or the Gate of St. Mary), off present-day Dame Street in Dublin city centre, which had been formerly owned, before the Dissolution of the Monasteries, by the Abbey of St. Augustine (now Bristol Cathedral). In 1543 he was leasing three shops in St. Audoen's parish, for which he managed, through a legal technicality, to pay no rent (an indication of his shrewd business sense). He was Mayor of Dublin in 1523–1524, and the city auditor from 1530 to 1537.

He was an Alderman of the city of Dublin in 1527. In that year he sat on a panel of four arbitrators who were appointed to determine a number of disputes between the Dublin City authorities and the Abbey of St. Thomas the Martyr, Dublin. Their decision is usually known as the Tolboll decree, as the principal dispute was over the so-called Tolboll, the right of the Abbot of St. Thomas to levy a tax on every brewery in Dublin, which had evidently aroused a good deal of resentment, and was referred to by the Abbot's critics as a "pretended right". The arbitrators' remit did not extend to questioning the lawfulness of the Tolboll itself: their task was to set the tax at a level which it was hoped would be acceptable to all parties, and thus achieve a full and final settlement of the dispute. The arbitrators, in an unrelated ruling, found that the Dublin city fathers had the sole right to control the supply of water from the River Dodder, which was then, and remained for several centuries afterwards, the main source of drinking water for the citizens of Dublin.

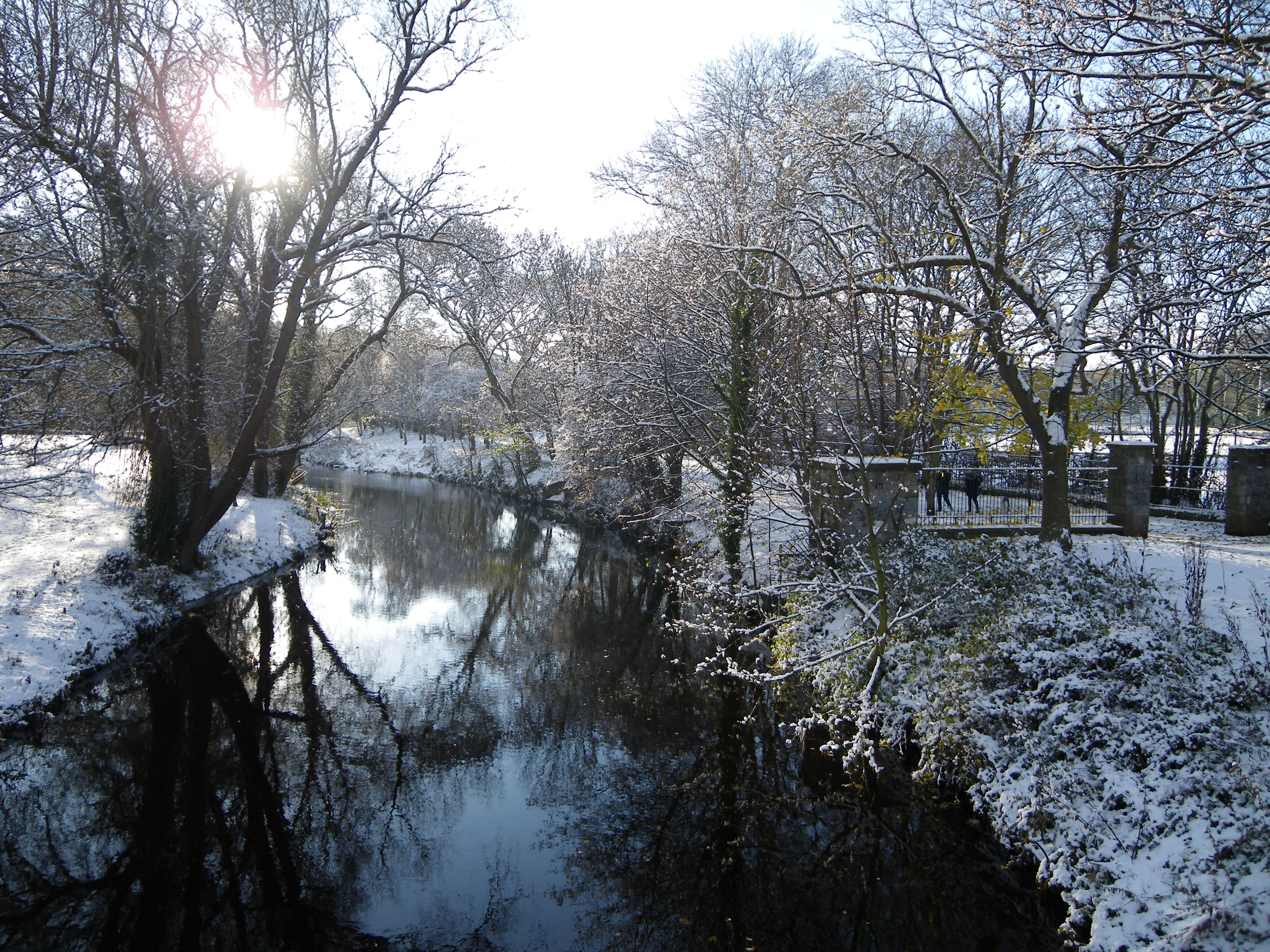
River Dodder, for centuries the main source of drinking water for the citizens of Dublin. Nicholas was one of the arbitrators who ruled in 1527 on who controlled the supply of water from it.

Despite his success as a businessman and as a local politician, his career was not free from controversy. As Mayor of Dublin, he clashed with the highly respected Archbishop of Dublin, Hugh Inge. Archbishop Inge complained to the Privy Council of Ireland that the Dublin city fathers, led by Queytrot, had unlawfully seized the Manor of St. Sepulchre (this consisted of several adjoining manors which between them covered much of present-day Dublin city south of the River Liffey). The Archbishop claimed the manor as part of the liberty of the Archdiocese of Dublin. The Council referred the matter to a panel consisting of the Chief Justices of the three Courts of Common Law. The judges determined that the disputed property was indeed within the liberty of the Archbishop and that he and his successors had the right to it in perpetuity, without let or hindrance from the Mayor of Dublin. It became colloquially known as the Archbishop's Liberty

Queytrot was also rather lax in his observation of the English statute, the Labourers Act 1405 (7 Hen. 4. c. 17), which prohibited a master from hiring an apprentice whose father's annual income was less than 20 shillings. In 1525 and again in 1541, he was summoned before the Court of Exchequer (Ireland) for breach of the statute and fined; but the fines imposed must have been small, since he continued to prosper in his business dealings.

More creditably he was a member, and for a time the Master, of Saint Anne's Guild, the leading religious guild in medieval Dublin, which was based at St. Audoen's Church.

His date of death is not recorded, but he probably died before 1552, when Walter Tyrrell was renting the house at Dame's-Gate which Queytrot had leased in 1537 for a term of years. James Queytrott (fl. 1567), also a merchant of Dublin, was most likely his son. In 1567 James Queytrott and Henry Browne leased lands at Dunboyne, County Meath, and Mullingar, County Westmeath, from the English Crown for 21 years.

== Sources ==
- Calendar to the Fiants of the reign of Queen Elizabeth I
- Gilbert, John T. editor Calendar of Ancient Records of Ireland 19 volumes Joseph Pollard Dublin 1889
- Griffiths, Margaret C. editor Calendar of Inquisitions formerly in the Office of the Chief Remembrancer of the Exchequer Stationery Office Dublin 1991
- O'Brien, Niall "Dublin masters and apprentices in the time of Henry VIII" Medieval News 17 May 2014
- Warburton, John; Whitelaw, James; Walsh, Robert History of the City of Dublin from the earliest accounts to the present day Cadell and Davies Dublin 1818

Civic offices
Preceded by No entry	Mayor of Dublin; 1523–1524	Succeeded by No entry
