= Barnby Dun with Kirk Sandall =

Coordinates: 53.57°N 1.07°W

- Civil parish
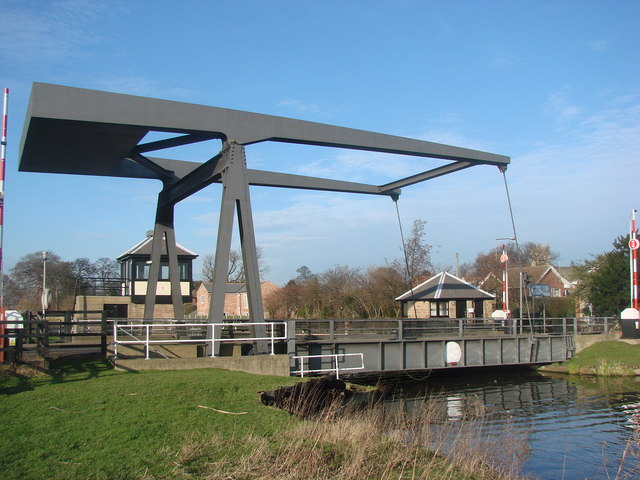
- Lifting bridge in Barnby Dun

- Location within South Yorkshire
- Area: 5.18 sq mi (13.4 km^{2})
- Population: 8,592 (2011 census)
  - Density: 1,659/sq mi (641/km^{2})
- Metropolitan borough: Doncaster
- Metropolitan county: South Yorkshire
- Region: Yorkshire and the Humber
- Country: England
- Sovereign state: United Kingdom
- Post town: DONCASTER
- Postcode district: DN3
- Dialling code: 01302
- Police: South Yorkshire
- Fire: South Yorkshire
- Ambulance: Yorkshire
- UK Parliament: Doncaster Central

Barnby Dun with Kirk Sandall is a civil parish in the Metropolitan Borough of Doncaster in South Yorkshire, England. According to the 2001 census it had a population of 8,524 and by 2011 this had risen to 8,592. The parish covers Barnby Dun and Kirk Sandall, both parts of the Doncaster urban area.

== History ==
The parish was formed in 1921 by the amalgamation of Barnby upon Don with Kirk Sandall. Until 1956 it also included Edenthorpe.

Barnby Dun was home to the Thorpe Marsh Power station before its closure in the middle 1990s. The left over cooling towers were demolished in 2012. It was decided that whilst being demolished explosives should not be used as they could rupture the nearby canal.

Barnby Dun was first named House-on-Dun after the River Don running beside it, however, the name was changed in the late 19th century to Barnby Dun due to the farms and farming lands surrounding the area on the north and west sides.

== Education ==
Barnby Dun has had elementary education since around 1872. The old school, as it is known now, with one classroom was paid for originally from local charities and the church fund. The property lies on Top Road, Barnby Dun. The first headteacher of the new school was Charles Newbound 1872–1895. During the last century extensions and additions to the school were made. As the village grew, so did the school but in 1977 a new infant school was built on Church Road and the original school became a junior school educating 7- to 12-year-old boys and girls. Due to a falling population it was decided that both schools be amalgamated and the infant school site was chosen as the new Primary school. Kirk Sandall has an infant and junior school which range from the ages of 4 to 11.

== Religious sites ==
Barnby Dun has a fourteenth-century church, St Peter & St Paul's. St Oswald's Church, Kirk Sandall is in the care of the Churches Conservation Trust

== Transport ==
Barnby Dun was served by Barnby Dun railway station, it is now closed. Kirk Sandall railway station is still operating. The village is directly linked to Doncaster town centre by bus. As of June 2020 the bus service is run by FirstBus.

== See also ==
- Listed buildings in Barnby Dun with Kirk Sandall
