= Hugh Inge =

English-born judge and prelate

Hugh Inge or Ynge(c. 1460 – 3 August 1528) was an English-born judge and prelate in sixteenth century Ireland who held the offices of Bishop of Meath, Archbishop of Dublin and Lord Chancellor of Ireland.

== Biography ==
Inge was born at Shepton Mallet in Somerset in about 1460. Not much is known about his parents, although it is said that they intended him for a career in the Church from an early age. He was educated at Winchester College, became a fellow of New College, Oxford in 1484, BA in 1491 and a Doctor of Divinity in 1511. He was ordained a priest in 1491. He held a number of minor benefices in England including the Church of St Mary the Virgin, Westonzoyland from 1508. After travelling around Europe, he became attached to the household of Adriano Castellesi, the Italian-born Bishop of Bath and Wells, and went with him to Rome in 1504. He became Warden of the English hospice in Rome and held the position until 1508. In about 1511 he came to the notice of Cardinal Wolsey, who recognised his gifts, took him into his household and advanced his career: he later admitted that he owed everything he achieved to Wolsey, and that "without him I had no comfort in this world".

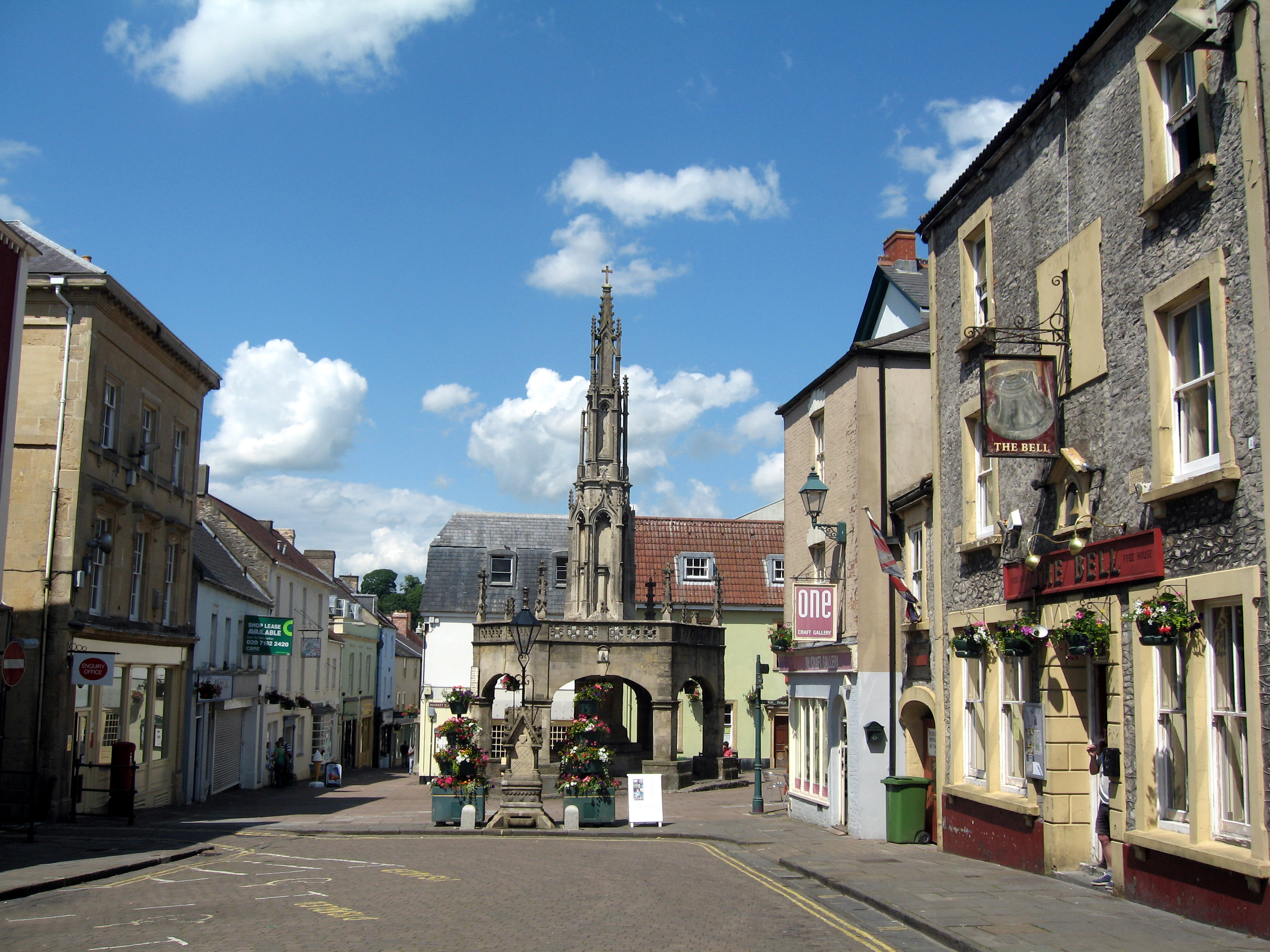
Shepton Mallet: The Market Cross, Shepton Mallet, present day. Hugh Inge was born here in about 1460

=== Inge in Ireland ===
In 1512, through Wolsey's influence, he was made Bishop of Meath. There was a quarrel between the two men which led to a brief estrangement, and in 1514 Inge wrote to Wolsey imploring him not to "cast him away". The cause of the quarrel appears to have been Wolsey's request that Inge surrender his office of Archdeacon of Meath, which he held jointly with the bishopric, to the royal physician. The quarrel was short-lived, and with Wolsey's renewed support Inge followed the same career path as William Rokeby, whom he succeeded both as Archbishop of Dublin and Lord Chancellor of Ireland in 1521. He was appointed to the Privy Council, apparently in an attempt to strengthen the "English party" on the Council. He was a popular and respected figure in Ireland, and enjoyed the friendship of Gerald FitzGerald, 9th Earl of Kildare, the dominant figure in Irish politics for many years. His regular letters to Wolsey stress that a key difficulty of the Dublin administration was the shortage of ready money.

Inge carried out extensive repairs to the episcopal palace of St. Sepulchre, which was then the Archbishop's principal residence in Dublin. His name is commemorated in Hugh Inge's door, which was restored in the eighteenth century; a few fragments of the door were discovered during excavations some years ago, at present-day Kevin Street. The door was described as having an unusual three-centred head.

The Archbishop was vigilant in protecting the rights and privileges of the See of Dublin, and in 1524 he complained to the Privy Council of Ireland that the city fathers of Dublin, headed by Nicholas Queytrot (or Coitrotte), who had lately held office as Lord Mayor of Dublin, had unlawfully occupied the Manor of St. Sepulchre (St. Sepulchre consisted of several adjoining manors, which covered most of present-day Dublin city south of the River Liffey). According to Inge, the manor was a "liberty" under the jurisdiction of the Archbishop. Queytrot was a formidable opponent, a prominent Dublin merchant and builder, who later served as the city auditor. The Council referred the matter to the three Chief Justices of the Courts of Common Law, who ruled that the disputed lands were indeed within the liberty of the Archbishop, and that he and his successors were entitled to hold them in perpetuity without let or hindrance by the Mayor of Dublin. At the same time he was engaged in a lawsuit with the Dean and Chapter of the Diocese of Kildare as to his rights of visitation in the Diocese if the office of Bishop of Kildare happened to be vacant: the outcome of this lawsuit is unknown

=== Death and reputation ===
In 1528 the fourth and most severe outbreak of the mysterious plague called the sweating sickness swept through England and Ireland, and also ravaged much of the continent of Europe. Inge was among its victims: he died on 3 August 1528 and was buried in St. Patrick's Cathedral, Dublin

The Victorian historian O'Flanagan praises him as a judge who was noted for his honesty, good sense and desire to do impartial justice; though his recorded judgements are few, they are said to have carried great weight. In his own lifetime Polydore Vergil praised him as an honest man who brought a measure of order and good government to a notoriously troubled kingdom. D'Alton calls him a man noted for "great justice and probity".

Catholic Church titles
Preceded by William Rokeby	Archbishop of Dublin; 1523–1528	Succeeded by John Alen
