= William Rokeby =

Bishop of Meath, Archbishop of Dublin and Lord Chancellor of Ireland

- Archbishop of Dublin
- Archdiocese: Dublin
- Appointed: 28 January 1512
- Predecessor: Walter Fitzsimon
- Successor: Hugh Inge
- Other post: Primate of Ireland
- Previous post: Bishop of Meath (1507)

Orders
- Ordination: 1487

Personal details
- Born: Kirk Sandall, England
- Died: November 29, 1521 Kirk Sandall, England
- Buried: St Oswald's Church; Church of St John the Baptist
- Denomination: Roman Catholic
- Occupation: Statesman, cleric

Lord Chancellor of Ireland
- In office 1516–1521
- Monarch: Henry VIII
- Preceded by: Sir William Compton
- Succeeded by: Hugh Inge
- In office 1512–1513
- Preceded by: Walter Fitzsimon
- Succeeded by: Sir William Compton

William Rokeby (died 29 November 1521) was a leading statesman and cleric in early sixteenth-century Ireland, who held the offices of Bishop of Meath, Archbishop of Dublin and Lord Chancellor of Ireland. He is commemorated in the Rokeby Chapels in two Yorkshire churches, St Oswald's Church, Kirk Sandall, and Halifax Minster.

== Early life ==
He was born at Kirk Sandall, near Doncaster, eldest of the five sons of John Rokeby (died 1506). His younger brother Sir Richard Rokeby (died 1523) was Comptroller of the Household to Cardinal Wolsey and later Treasurer of Ireland.William retained a deep affection for Kirk Sandall and returned there to die. He went to school at Rotherham; studied at Oxford and became a fellow of King's Hall, later Trinity College, Cambridge. He became vicar of his home parish in 1487 and was transferred to Halifax, another town for which he had a deep attachment, in about 1499.In 1507 he was made Bishop of Meath.

== Later career ==
On the death of Walter Fitzsimon in 1511, Rokeby became Archbishop of Dublin. It has been suggested that his elevation was due at least in part to his English birth, as the Crown was anxious to place Englishmen high up in the Irish hierarchy. No doubt his brother's close connection to Wolsey also played a part. He was Lord Chancellor of Ireland from 1512 to 1513 and from 1516 to 1522.

O'Flanagan believes that he was a good and diligent Lord Chancellor, although he did not leave behind many written judgments. He was clearly a trusted servant of the Crown: in particular, the Lord Deputy, Surrey, with the approval of Henry VIII, chose Rokeby in 1520 as mediator in the feud, which had become exceptionally bitter, between Maurice FitzGerald, 9th Earl of Desmond and Piers Butler, 8th Earl of Ormond.

As Archbishop he made a reputation as a peacemaker, settling a long and bitter dispute between the Dean and Chapter of St. Patrick's Cathedral.He gave permission to Gerald FitzGerald, 9th Earl of Kildare for the original foundation of Maynooth College, which was suppressed in 1535. He was frequently at the English Court, so often indeed that he was accused of neglecting his official duties back in Ireland. He participated in the christening of the future Queen Mary I in 1516 and the ceremony by which Wolsey received his cardinal's hat.

As Archbishop of Dublin, he is best remembered for the Synod of 1518.The Synod prohibited the use of any tin chalice at Mass, and the disposal of Church property by laymen; and attempted to regulate the procedure for dealing with intestate estates, the payment of tithes and burial fees and the rules for admission to the clergy.Rather comically, Rokeby strictly forbade clergymen to play football.

He was appointed Archdeacon of Surrey on 27 March 1519. By 1521 his health was failing: he retired to Kirk Sandall and died there on 29 November. In his will he left £200 to rebuild St. Mary's Church, Beverley, whose tower had collapsed the previous year.

== The Rokeby Chapels ==
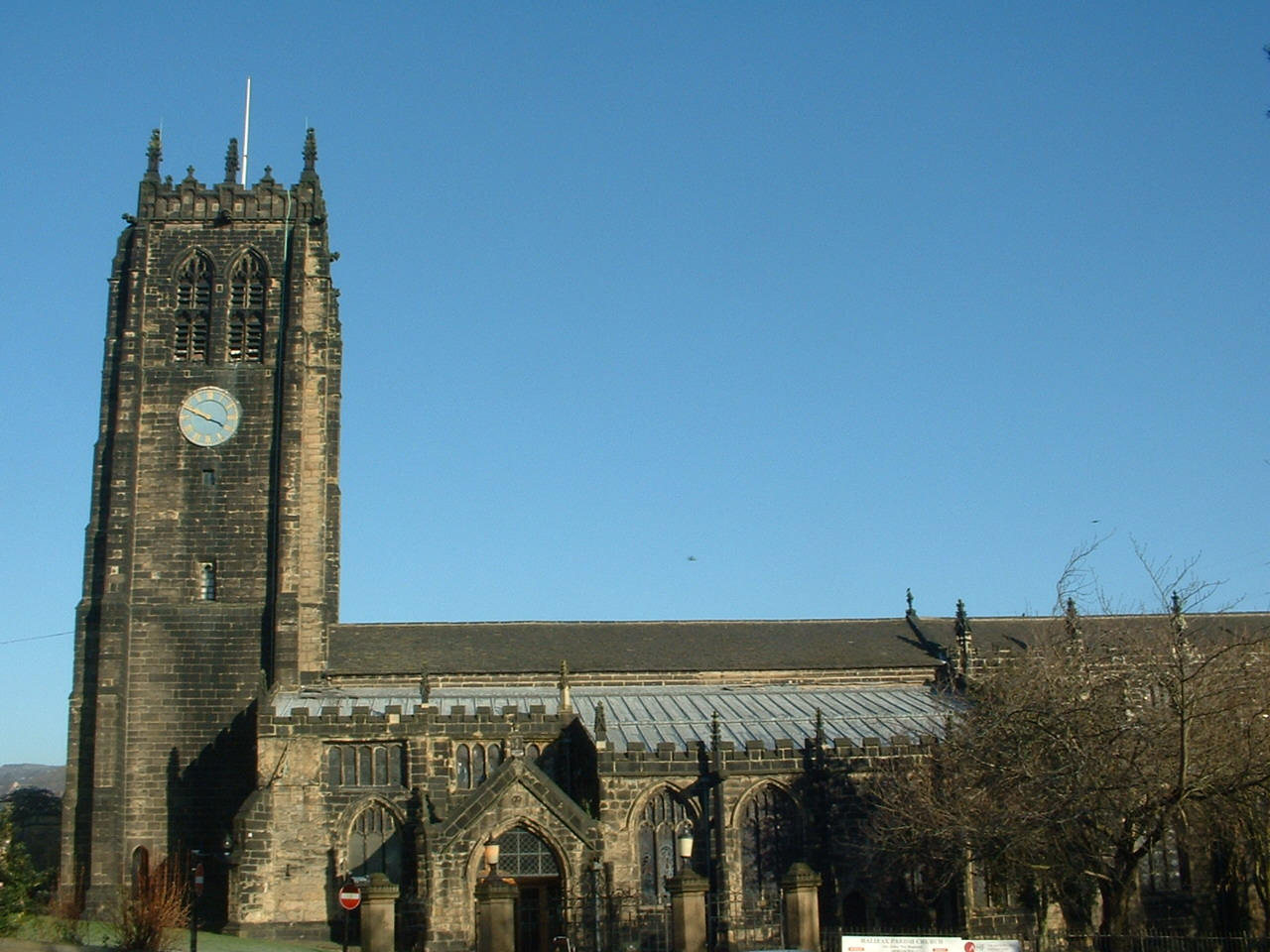
Halifax Minster, where Rokeby's heart is buried

Rokeby made elaborate provisions in his will for the disposal of his remains. In accordance with his wishes, his body was buried in St Oswald's Church, Kirk Sandall, but his heart and bowels were buried in the Church of St John the Baptist, Halifax (now known as Halifax Minster). Mortuary chapels were erected at both spots, which still exist today.

== Character ==
O'Flanagan praises Rokeby as a good man, a good bishop and, so far as we can tell from the scanty records, a good judge. Elrington Ball, while acknowledging his good qualities, suggests that he was a failure as Irish Lord Chancellor, due partly to his frequent absences in England.

Catholic Church titles
Preceded by Walter Fitzsimon	Archbishop of Dublin; 1512–1521	Succeeded by Hugh Inge
