= John Comyn (bishop) =

Anglo-Norman bishop

- Archbishop of Dublin
- Archdiocese: Dublin

Personal details
- Born: 1150 England
- Died: 25 October 1212 (aged 61–62) Dublin, Ireland
- Buried: Christ Church Cathedral
- Denomination: Roman Catholic
- Residence: Dublin Castle

John Comyn (c. 1150 – 25 October 1212) was Archbishop of Dublin, Ireland, from 1180 to 1212. He was born in England and moved to Ireland in 1184.

== Life ==
John Comyn was chaplain to Henry II and on his "urgent" recommendation was elected Archbishop of Dublin following the death of St. Laurence O'Toole in 1180. He had been a Benedictine monk at the Evesham Abbey.

In 1181, he was elected to the archbishopric of Dublin by some of the clergy of Dublin, who had assembled at Evesham for the purpose. He was not then a priest, but was subsequently, in the same year, ordained such, at Velletri, and on Palm Sunday (21 March) was there consecrated archbishop by Pope Lucius III. The following year the pope granted him manors and lands in and around Dublin, which subsequently formed the Manor of St. Sepulchre, which remained under the authority of the Archbishop of Dublin until the 19th century. The pope also, in an effort to protect the Dublin archbishopric from claims from Canterbury, extended certain privileges to Comyn, which intensified the rivalry between the sees of Dublin and Armagh for the Primacy of Ireland.

Comyn waited three years before visiting Ireland, until he was sent there by King Henry to prepare the reception of his son, Prince John. The king granted him lands and privileges which made him a Lord of Parliament. After his arrival in Ireland, John granted Comyn the Bishopric of Glendalough, with all its appurtenances in lands, manors, churches, tithes, fisheries and liberties, although Comyn never had an opportunity to take this up in his lifetime. Under Pope Urban III carried out a number of reforms of the Irish church to bring it into line with the church in England and in continental Europe.

In 1189, Archbishop Comyn assisted at the coronation of Richard I. The following year he demolished the old parish church of St. Patrick, south of Dublin, and erected a new building, next to his Palace of St. Sepulchre, which he elevated to the status of a collegiate church, and which later became St. Patrick's Cathedral. This enabled him to rule in his own Liberty, without the interference of the mayor and citizens. About the same time he enlarged the choir of Christ Church Cathedral.

Prince John granted Comyn further legal rights throughout the country of Ireland, while Comyn also received the church and lands of All Hallows, to the northeast of Dublin. Between Lusk and Swords he founded the convent of Grace Dieu, which later became wealthy through grants from the Anglo-Norman prelates and magnates. However, when Hamo de Valoniis (alias de Valois), was appointed Justiciar of Ireland he seized some of these lands for the treasury (with a good portion for himself), and a dispute arose which caused Comyn to flee for his own safety to Normandy. Comyn appealed to Pope Innocent III, who settled the dispute, but John was angered by the actions of Comyn, and did not reconcile himself with him until 1206.

Comyn died six years later and was buried in Christ Church Cathedral, where a marble monument was erected to his memory. Two years later William Piro, Bishop of Glendalough, died, whereupon the union of the sees granted by King John took place.

Religious titles
Preceded by Lorcan Ua Tuathail	Archbishop of Dublin; 1181–1212	Succeeded by Henry de Loundres
