= Barnby Dun railway station =

Disused railway station in Barnby Dun, Doncaster, England

Barnby Dun
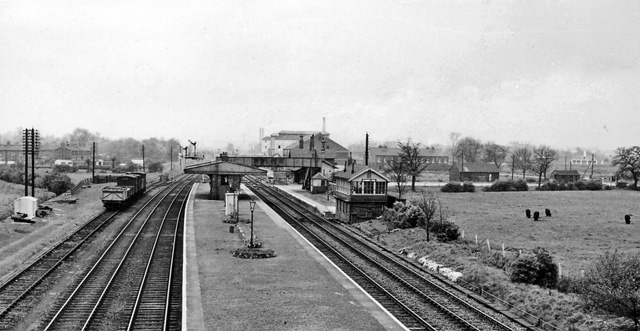
- Barnby Dun railway station in 1961

General information
- Location: Barnby Dun, Doncaster; England
- Coordinates: 53.5680°N 1.0658°W
- Grid reference: SE619083

Other information
- Status: Disused

History
- Original company: South Yorkshire & River Dun Navigation

Key dates
- 1 July 1856: Opened
- 1866: Closed and replaced with new station
- 4 September 1967: closed
Location

Barnby Dun railway station was a small station on the South Yorkshire Railway's line between Doncaster and Thorne. It served the village of Barnby Dun, near Doncaster, South Yorkshire, England. The original line followed closely the canal bank and the station was resited when the line was 'straightened' in the 1860s.

The original station, which was situated across the canal from the village, was opened with the line on 1 July 1856 and closed on 1 October 1866 when the new station, at the opposite side of the village was opened.

The rebuilt station consisted of flanking platforms with its main buildings, in yellow engineers brick, on the Thorne-bound (up) platform. This platform was long, with a ramp to a barrow crossing to the 'down' side at its centre. The station was again rebuilt to accommodate four tracks in the Doncaster to Thorne widening of 1913 when the Doncaster-bound (down) platform was moved back. The station closed on 4 September 1967. The station building was demolished in July 2008.

| Preceding station | Disused railways | Following station |
|---|---|---|
| Kirk Sandall | South Yorkshire Railway & River Dun Navigation; Doncaster to Thorne Railway | Bramwith |
