= Listed buildings in Barnby Dun with Kirk Sandall =

Barnby Dun with Kirk Sandall is a civil parish in the metropolitan borough of Doncaster, South Yorkshire, England. The parish contains four listed buildings that are recorded in the National Heritage List for England. Of these, one is listed at Grade I, the highest of the three grades, one is at Grade II*, the middle grade, and the others are at Grade II, the lowest grade. The parish contains the villages of Barnby Dun and Kirk Sandall, and the surrounding area. The listed buildings consist of two churches, a churchyard cross, and a barn and cart shed.

== Key ==
Grade	Criteria
I	Buildings of exceptional interest, sometimes considered to be internationally important
II*	Particularly important buildings of more than special interest
II	Buildings of national importance and special interest

== Buildings ==
Name and location	Photograph	Date	Notes	Grade
St Oswald's Church, Kirk Sandall; 53.56628°N 1.08155°W		Early 12th century	The church was extended and altered in the later centuries, restored in 1864 and in 1935, and later made redundant. It is built in limestone and river cobbles, with a roof of lead and tile. It consists of a nave, north and south aisles, a south porch with a truncated tower behind, and a chancel with a larger north chapel. The top stage of the tower was removed in 1935, and replaced by a pyramidal roof with louvred gablets. The chapel was added in the early 16th century, it is in Perpendicular style, and has an embattled parapet.	II*
St Peter and St Paul's Church, Barnby Dun; 53.58061°N 1.07383°W		Early 14th century	The tower dates from the 15th century, and the chancel was rebuilt in 1859–62. The church is built in magnesian limestone, with roofs of slate and lead. It consists of a nave with a clerestory, north and south aisles, a south porch, a chancel, and a west tower. The tower is in Perpendicular style, and has three stages, angle buttresses, a three-light west window, a string course with gargoyles, and an embattled parapet with eight crocketed pinnacles. In the body of the church, two of the buttresses contain ogee-headed niches.	I
Churchyard cross 53.56611°N 1.08149°W	—	Late medieval (probable)	The remains of the cross are in the churchyard of St Oswald's Church, Kirk Sandall, and are in magnesian limestone. There is an octagonal base with pyramidal corner stops, and a shaft in a square socket.	II
Barn and cartshed 53.56599°N 1.08074°W		1824	The barn and cart shed near St Oswald's Church, Kirk Sandall are in red brick with stone slate eaves courses, dentilled eaves, and a hipped pantile roof. The barn has two storeys and five bays, and attached to the front is a single-storey five-bay cart shed. The barn has a central arched wagon entry with a keystone, slit vents, hatches, and a doorway over which is an arched recess containing a datestone. On the front of the cart shed are three open bays with cylindrical brick piers, the other piers infilled.	II
