= Manor of St. Sepulchre =

Manors in Dublin, Ireland

Coordinates: 53.330°N 6.264°W

The Manor of St. Sepulchre (also known as the Archbishop's Liberty) is one of several manors, or liberties, that existed in Dublin, Ireland, since the arrival of the Anglo-Normans in the 12th century. They were townlands united to the city, but still preserving their own jurisdiction. St. Sepulchre's was under the jurisdiction of the Archbishop of Dublin, although from time to time the Dublin city government claimed ownership of it.

Parts of the manor's main palace are still preserved to this day, representing some of the oldest surviving construction in Dublin's city centre. It is now used by a unit of the Garda Síochána and is not accessible to the public.

== History ==
=== Medieval period ===
The district was originally known as the Manor of Colonia (or the lordship of Colonia). The transition to the name Saint Sepulchre occurred during the late 13th century; by 1301, manorial receipts were formally recorded under the name Manor of St. Sepulchre with Cullen. The nomenclature is attributed to the influence of the Crusades; in 1184, Heraclitus, the Patriarch of Jerusalem, visited England and Ireland to seek military aid, an event that likely prompted Archbishop John Comyn to name his new palatial seat in honour of Jerusalem's Church of the Holy Sepulchre.

Archaeological evidence indicates that before the formal enclosure of the palace precinct, the area was settled in the late 12th century as a rural landscape of property plots. Excavations conducted by Linzi Simpson between 2004 and 2008 discovered a ritual deposit from this early phase containing a male human skull with violent sword trauma buried alongside a fully fleshed dog skeleton. Following this period, the palace was enclosed by a substantial defensive ditch along the alignment of modern Kevin Street and Bride Street.

In 1326, an inquisition following structural damage sustained between 1315–1318 described the palace as having a "stone hall, badly roofed with shingles and weak," alongside a chapel and kitchen in poor repair, and a manor prison that had been "broken and thrown to the ground."

=== Tudor and early modern transition ===
During the 16th century, the Archbishops of Dublin were frequently displaced from the palace due to administrative shifts. Under Edward VI, the palace was assigned as the residence for the Lord Lieutenant of Ireland (the "Deputy of our Realm"), forcing the Archbishop to move to the Deanery. Although the Archbishop was briefly reinstated under Mary I, the palace was used again by the Archbishop in the early Elizabethan period. By the late 16th century, Archbishop Adam Loftus restored the complex, which was then described as a "semi-regal abode."

By the late 17th century, the palace outbuildings were replaced by brick houses along the street frontage, built by Dutch immigrants escaping religious persecution.

=== End of the Liberty ===
By the early 19th century, the palace was no longer used as an archiepiscopal residence and was described by contemporaries as being in a state of "mud, rags and wretchedness." Under the Archbishop's Palace, Dublin Act 1804 (44 Geo. 3. c. 63), the property was vested in the Crown for public use. In 1806, it was formally converted into a barracks for the Mounted Division of the Dublin Metropolitan Police (DMP).

The jurisdiction of the Liberty was formally abolished by the Manor Court of St. Sepulchre Abolition Act 1856 (19 & 20 Vict. c. 57).

== Location ==
The importance of the Manor of St. Sepulchre was enhanced in that it consisted of a number of manors, many of which lay outside the city or even the county of Dublin. The manor of St. Sepulchre in the city was the principal manor. The city manor boundaries stretched from Bishop Street to St. Stephen's Green, along Harcourt Street to Donnybrook, across Rathgar to Harold's Cross and back along Clanbrassil Street. In 1523-4 Archbishop Hugh Inge was engaged in a legal dispute with the Mayor and Corporation of Dublin, who had apparently taken possession of the manor.

An Act of the Parliament of Ireland of 2 June 1774 (13 & 14 Geo. 3 c. 34 (Ir)) formed a barony, the Barony of St. Sepulchre, from that part of the manor lying north of the South Circular Road. This had previously been part of the barony of Uppercross. Within it were the civil parishes of St. Kevin, St. Nicholas Without and part of St. Peter's. The barony was abolished by the Dublin Baronies Act 1842 (5 & 6 Vict. c. 96), when the area was transferred from the county to the city.

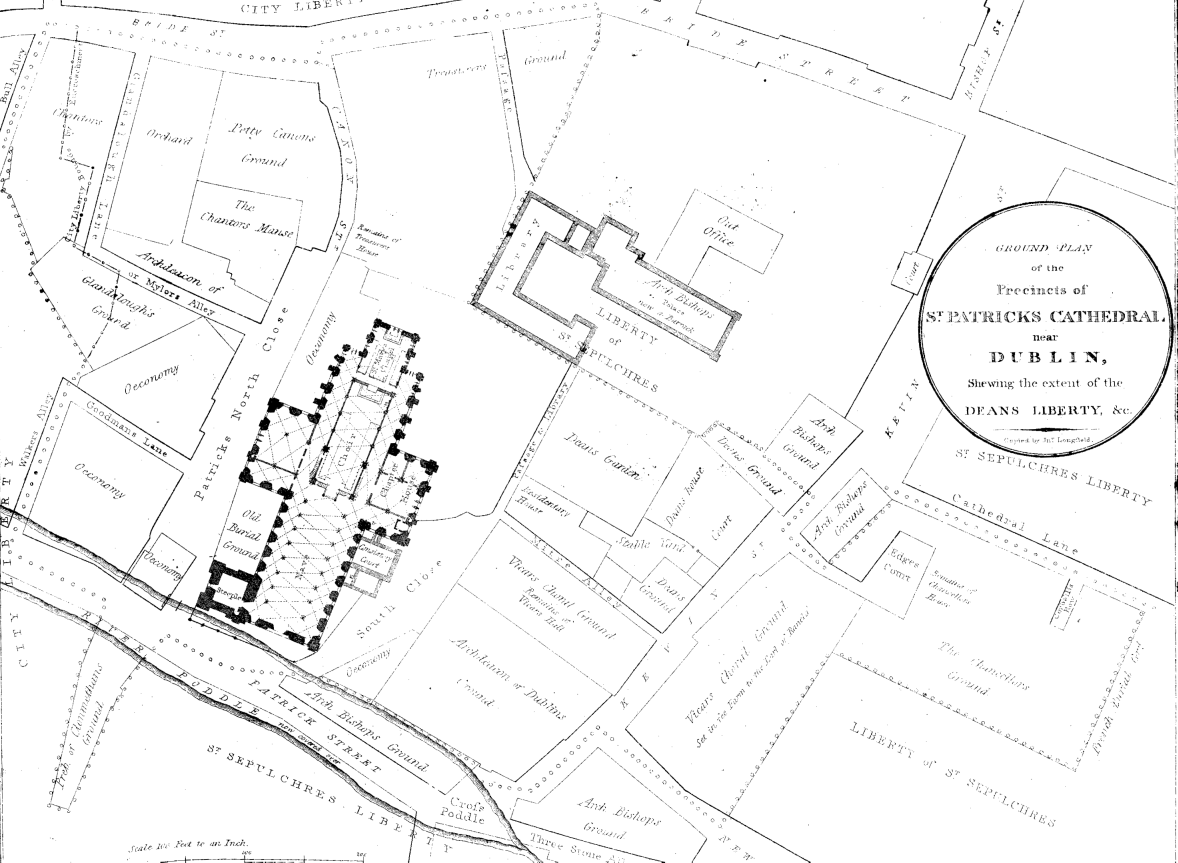
A 19th-century plan of the precincts of St. Patrick's Cathedral, showing the Manor of St. Sepulchre and its palace

Outside the city, there were manors belonging to St. Sepulchre's in Swords, Lusk, Shankhill, Tallaght, Finglas and other places. Each of these manors was governed by a portreeve, who was sworn in each Easter by the seneschal of St. Sepulchre.

== Privileges ==
In return for the support of the Archbishop, or to alleviate certain hardships suffered by Englishmen or the church in Ireland, privileges were granted to the manor (that is, to the archbishop and his successors) at various times and by various kings of England. These allowed the city manor (and its constituent manors outside the city) to have their own courts of justice (Courts Leet, Courts Baron and a Court of Record, where they were allowed to try all crimes except "forestalling, rape, treasure-trove and arson"), free customs, freedom from certain taxes and services, impose their own fines, have their own coroners, rights of salvage, maintain their own fairs and markets, regulate weights and measures, etc. For those condemned to death, the archbishop had his own gallows at Harold's Cross.

Manor Court of St. Sepulchre Abolition Act 1856 (Note: Section 1.)
- Act of Parliament
- Parliament of the United Kingdom
- Long title: An Act to abolish the Jurisdiction of the Court of the Liberties and Manor of Saint Sepulchre in and near Dublin, and for the future Regulation of certain Markets of the said Manor.
- Citation: 19 & 20 Vict. c. 57
- Territorial extent: United Kingdom

Dates
- Royal assent: 21 July 1856
- Commencement: 1 September 1856 (Note: Section 3.)

Status: Current legislation

Text of statute as originally enacted

These rights and privileges were ended by the Manor Court of Saint Sepulchre Abolition Act 1856 (19 & 20 Vict. c. 57), the last such jurisdiction remaining in Ireland.

== St. Sepulchre's Palace ==
The Manor of St Sepulchre was administered from St. Sepulchre's Palace, the residence of the Archbishops of Dublin and the seat of the manorial court. The palace, located beside St Patrick's Cathedral, served as the administrative and judicial centre of the manor until the liberty was abolished in the nineteenth century.

== Demographics ==
In 1813 the population of this manor was 3,728 males and 5,273 females.

== Bibliography ==
- Clarke, H.B. (2016) [2002]. Dublin, part I, to 1610. Irish Historic Towns Atlas. Vol. 11 (Online ed.). Royal Irish Academy. Archived from the original on 25 December 2018.
  - For medieval liberty boundaries see "Map 4, Historical Map for Dublin, c.840–1540" (PDF).
