= St Oswald's Church, Kirk Sandall =

Coordinates: 53.5663°N 1.0815°W

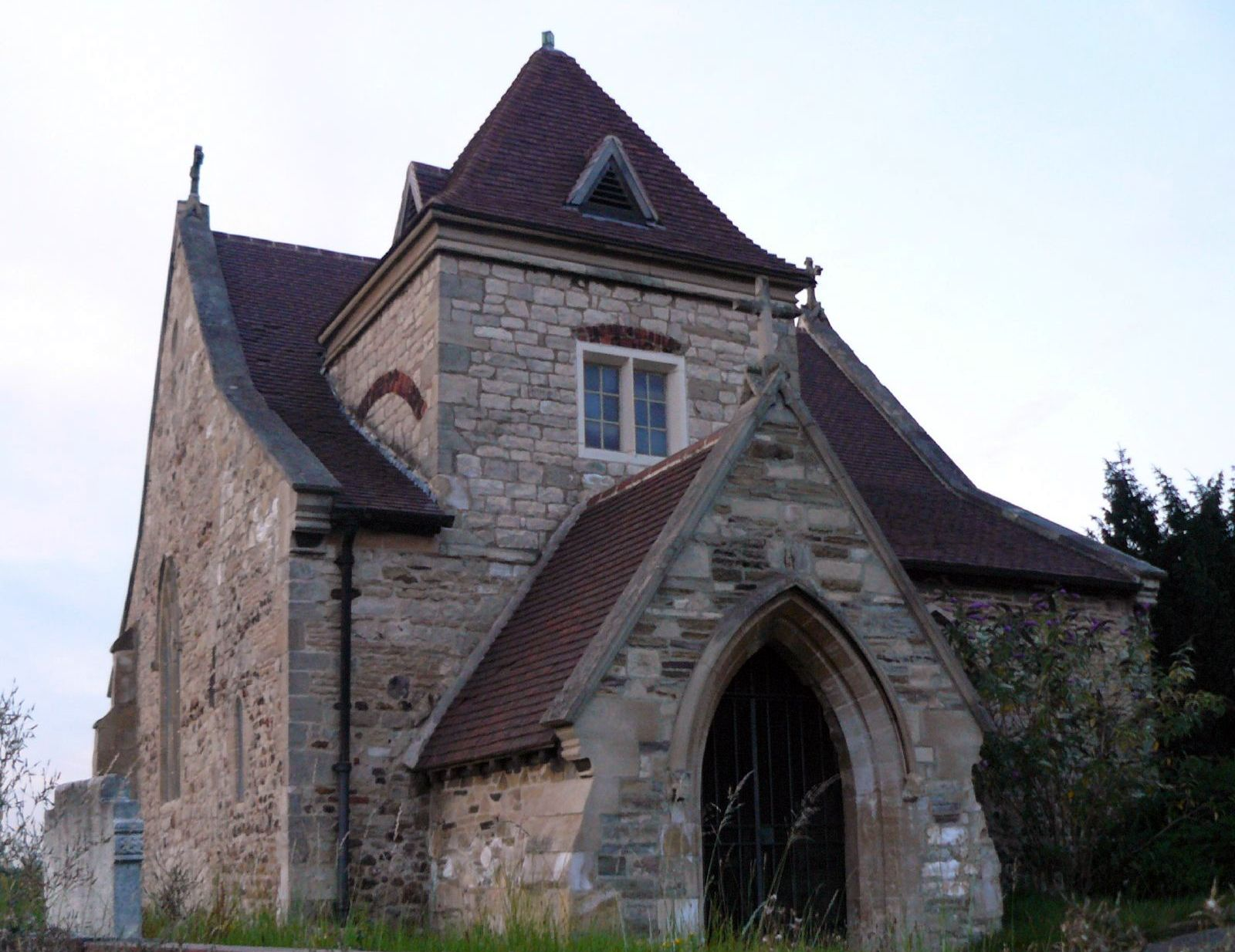
- St Oswald's Church, Kirk Sandall, from the southwest

- Location in South Yorkshire
- OS grid reference: SE 609 081
- Location: Kirk Sandall, Doncaster, South Yorkshire
- Country: England
- Denomination: Anglican
- Website: Churches Conservation Trust

History
- Dedication: Saint Oswald

Architecture
- Functional status: Redundant
- Heritage designation: Grade II*
- Designated: 5 June 1968
- Architectural type: Church
- Style: Norman, Gothic
- Groundbreaking: 12th century
- Completed: 1935

Specifications
- Materials: Limestone, lead and tile roofs

St Oswald's Church is a redundant Anglican church in Kirk Sandall, near Doncaster, South Yorkshire, England. It is recorded in the National Heritage List for England as a designated Grade II* listed building, and is under the care of the Churches Conservation Trust.

== History ==
The church is dedicated to Saint Oswald, king of Northumbria, and there is a legend that his body rested on the site after he was killed in 642. A church was present at the time of the Domesday Book in 1086. Most of the present church was built in the 12th century, with additions and alterations in the 14th and 16th centuries. It was restored in 1864 by James Massingbird Teale, and again in 1934. The Rokeby Chapel is named after William Rokeby, rector of Kirk Sandall from 1487 to 1502. He later became vicar of Halifax, then Bishop of Meath, Lord Chancellor of Ireland, and Archbishop of Dublin. The chapel was built soon after his death in 1521. The tower was added in 1828 but was truncated in 1935. By the 1960s the local population had declined, a new church was built in a nearby growing village. St Oswald's was declared redundant on 1 March 1979, and was vested in the Trust on 27 July 1980.

== Architecture ==
=== Exterior ===
St Oswald's is constructed in rubble and ashlar limestone, and has lead and tile roofs. Its plan consists of a two-bay nave with north and south aisles, a south porch and a west tower rising from the south aisle. The chancel has two bays and to its north is the larger two-bay Rokeby Chapel. The style of the nave and aisles is essentially Norman, while the chancel is Gothic and, within the latter style, the Rokeby Chapel is Perpendicular. The tower had to be shortened in the 1930s because it was unsafe. It functions as a belfry and contains one bell, cast in 1690. In its south face is a two-light window, its roof is pyramidal and it contains a small louvred gable on each side. The porch has a pointed arch over which is a gable carrying a cross. The doorway to the church is Norman is style with a two-order round arch. In the west wall of the nave is a three-light window. Above the window are stones arranged in a herring-bone pattern. It is thought that these stones date from the Anglo-Saxon era and were formerly part of the fabric of the original church on the site. The east window has three lights. The Rokeby Chapel has an embattled parapet and a string course carved with animals. Its blocked east window has five lights, and on its north wall is a diagonal west buttress and a further buttress between two four-light windows.

=== Interior ===
The arcades between the nave and the aisles are Norman in style and consist of octagonal piers, with broad square capitals and round arches. The nave roof dates from the 19th century. In the south aisle is a round-headed piscina. The cylindrical font is Norman in style and stands on a plinth with two steps. There are two traceried wooden screens, one to the west of the chancel, the other to the west of the chapel. On the north wall of the chapel is the tomb of William Rokeby. On the east wall, blocking the former window, is a marble monument to Thomas Rokeby who died in 1699. On the south wall is a monument to another William Rokeby who died in 1662. Elsewhere in the chapel are memorial floor slabs and brasses. In one of the windows is stained glass dating from the 16th century.

== External features ==
In the churchyard are the remains of a cross dating probably from the medieval period. It is constructed with Magnesian Limestone and consists of an octagonal base with a weathered shaft about 1 metre (3 ft) in height. It is a Grade II listed building.

== Present day ==
The church is available for visiting, its keyholder living nearby. The work of the Trust is supported locally by a group known as the Friends of St Oswald's, Kirk Sandall. Various activities are organised in the church. These include exhibitions, and occasional services arranged in cooperation with the local parish Church of The Good Shepherd.

== See also ==
- List of churches preserved by the Churches Conservation Trust in Northern England
- Grade II* listed buildings in South Yorkshire
- Listed buildings in Barnby Dun with Kirk Sandall
