= Kirk Sandall =

Village in South Yorkshire, England

Coordinates: 53.5500°N 1.0833°W

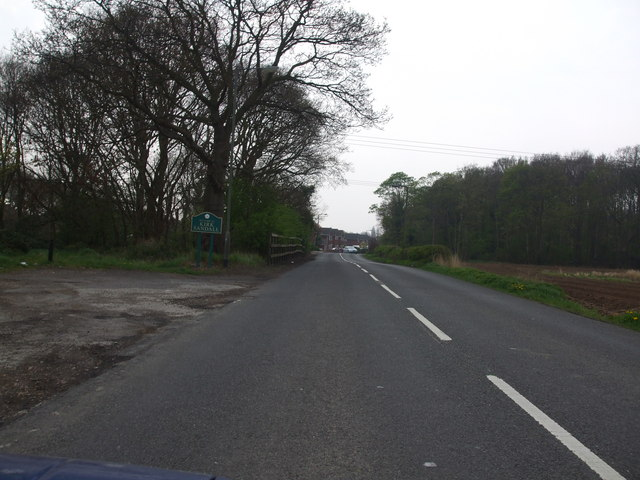
- Entering Kirk Sandall

- Location within South Yorkshire
- Civil parish: Barnby Dun with Kirk Sandall
- Metropolitan borough: Doncaster
- Metropolitan county: South Yorkshire
- Region: Yorkshire and the Humber
- Country: England
- Sovereign state: United Kingdom
- Post town: DONCASTER
- Postcode district: DN3
- Dialling code: 01302
- Police: South Yorkshire
- Fire: South Yorkshire
- Ambulance: Yorkshire

Kirk Sandall is an outer suburb of Doncaster, located around 4 miles (6.4 km) north-east of the city centre, in the civil parish of Barnby Dun with Kirk Sandall, in the county of South Yorkshire, England.

It is served by Kirk Sandall railway station.

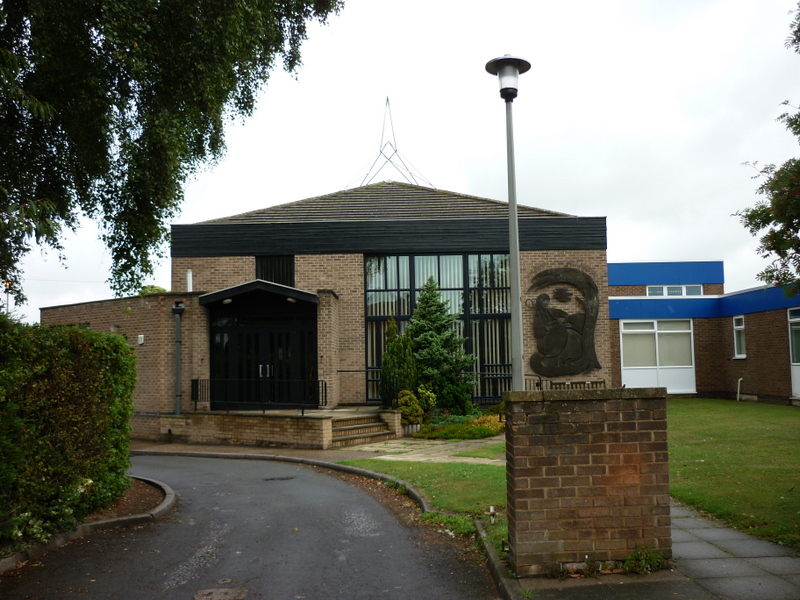
Church of the Good Shepherd

In 1921 the parish had a population of 606. On 1 October 1921 the parish was abolished to form "Barnby Dun with Kirk Sandall".

The name Sandall derives from the Old English sandhalh meaning 'sandy nook of land'. Kirk derives from the Old Norse kirkja meaning 'church'.

== See also ==
- Listed buildings in Barnby Dun with Kirk Sandall
- St Oswald's Church, Kirk Sandall
- The Church of the Good Shepherd, Kirk Sandall and Edenthorpe
