= Kirk Sandall railway station =

Railway station in South Yorkshire, England

Kirk Sandall
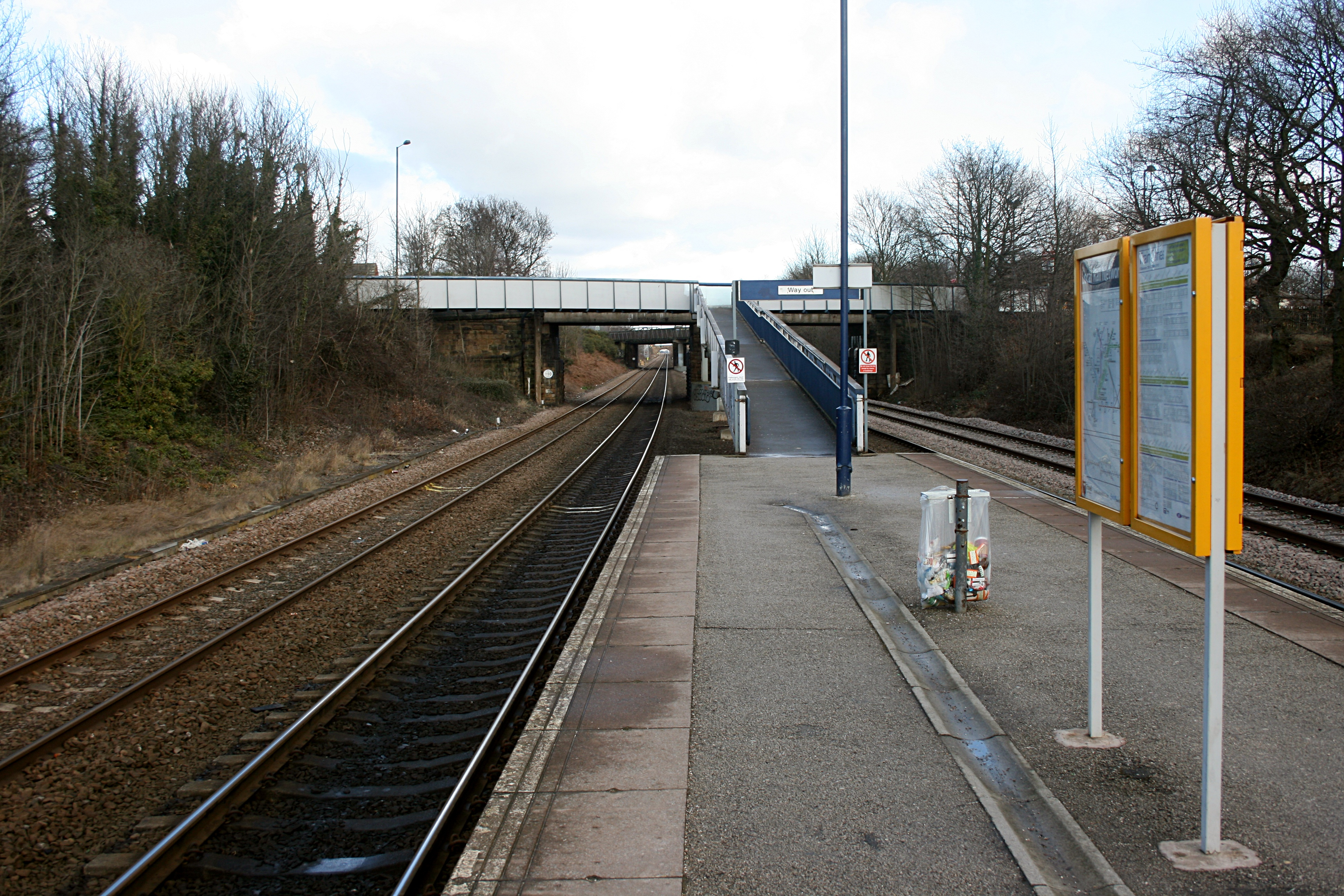

General information
- Location: Kirk Sandall, Doncaster; England
- Coordinates: 53.563130°N 1.075480°W
- Grid reference: SE613077
- Managed by: Northern
- Transit authority: South Yorkshire
- Platforms: 2

Other information
- Station code: KKS
- Fare zone: Doncaster
- Classification: DfT category F1

Passengers
- 2020/21: ▼20,996
- 2021/22: ▲60,020
- 2022/23: ▼49,350
- 2023/24: ▲71,328
- 2024/25: ▲85,804
Location
Notes
- Passenger statistics from the Office of Rail and Road

Kirk Sandall railway station serves the suburb of Kirk Sandall in Doncaster, South Yorkshire, England. The station is 4 miles (6 km) north of Doncaster on the South Humberside Main Line. The current station opened by British Rail in 1991 and is not on the site of the original station, which was about 0.5 miles (1 km) up the line eastwards.

== Facilities ==
The station consists of a single concrete island platform located between the inner 'fast' lines on the quad track section of route between Marshgate Junction, Doncaster and Thorne Junction. It is unstaffed but there is a ticket machine near to the car park entrance. A single waiting shelter is the only structure on the platform apart from bench seating, timetable posters and customer information screens. Both platforms are fully accessible by means of a long inclined ramp from the main entrance on the road above.

== Service ==
The station provides an hourly service Eastbound to Hull during the daytime Monday to Saturday. Additionally, there is usually 1 service per second hour to Scunthorpe and a single morning service to Bridlington and Scarborough. Westbound service comprises three trains per two hours to Doncaster. There are no longer regular through trains from here to Meadowhall and Sheffield (these having ended at the winter 2019 timetable change), though a pair of services still operate - one in the morning peak and the other in the late evening. The service towards Scunthorpe formerly ran hourly, but was curtailed during the pandemic in 2020 and has not been fully reinstated.

TransPennine Express serves the station with a single eastbound Monday-Saturday service to Cleethorpes in the late evening. There is no return service westbound.

== Notes ==
Preceding station	National Rail	Following station
Doncaster	Northern South Humberside Main Line	Hatfield and Stainforth
Doncaster	TransPennine Express South TransPennine; Limited Service	Hatfield and Stainforth
