= Low Burnham =

Village in North Lincolnshire, England

Coordinates: 53.5106°N 0.8252°W

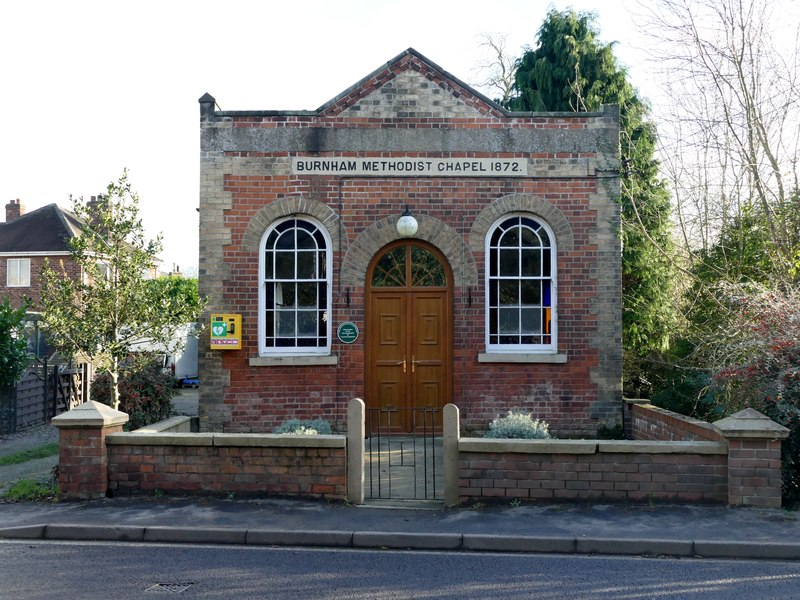
- The Former Burnham Methodist Chapel, is now the village hall.

- Location within Lincolnshire
- Population: 409 (2021 Census)
  - London: 172 mi (277 km) S
- Civil parish: Haxey
- Unitary authority: North Lincolnshire
- Ceremonial county: Lincolnshire
- Region: Yorkshire and the Humber
- Country: England
- Sovereign state: United Kingdom
- Post town: Doncaster
- Postcode district: DN9
- Dialling code: 0147
- Police: Humberside
- Fire: Humberside
- Ambulance: East Midlands
- UK Parliament: Doncaster East and the Isle of Axholme

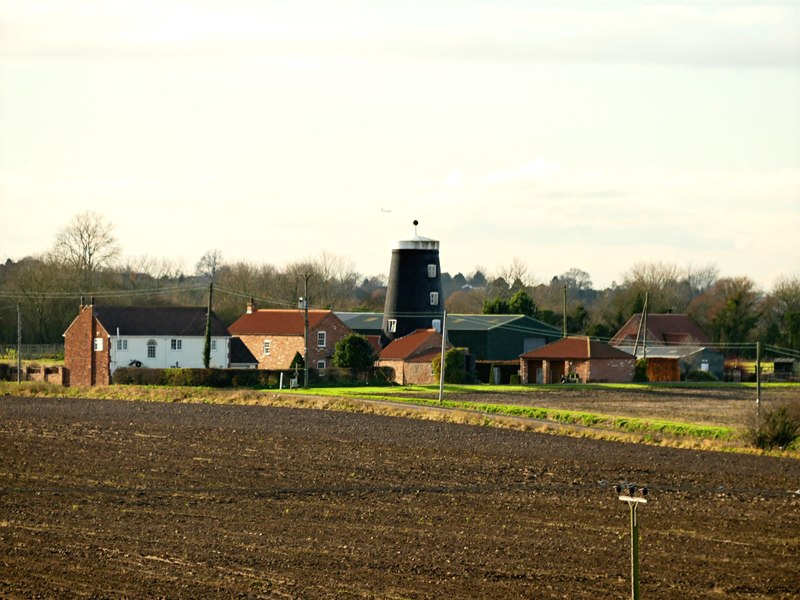
Burnham Mill

Low Burnham is a small village in the civil parish of Haxey on the Isle of Axholme in the unitary area of North Lincolnshire in Lincolnshire, England. The village is located to the south of the market town of Epworth and the north of the town of Haxey. The village is home to a local attraction known as the Holy Well which is a small spring of water believed to date back to when King Oswald was slain. The well holds importance as a historical landmark due to its location at one of the many battlefields of the Battle of Maserfield in 614 A.D. The village is also home to Lower Burnham Mill and the former Burnham Primitive Methodist Church. The hamlet of High Burnham is to the southeast of the village.
