= East Butterwick =

Village and civil parish in North Lincolnshire, England

Coordinates: 53.540°N 0.73847°W

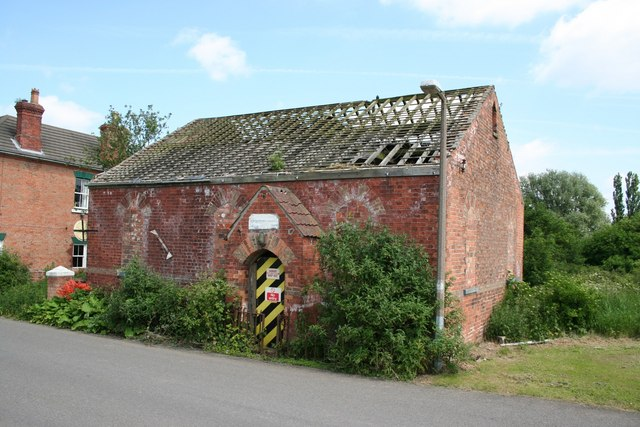
- Primitive Methodist Chapel, East Butterwick

- Location within Lincolnshire
- Population: 135 (2011)
- OS grid reference: SE836056
  - London: 140 mi (230 km) S
- Unitary authority: North Lincolnshire
- Ceremonial county: Lincolnshire
- Region: Yorkshire and the Humber
- Country: England
- Sovereign state: United Kingdom
- Post town: SCUNTHORPE
- Postcode district: DN17
- Police: Humberside
- Fire: Humberside
- Ambulance: East Midlands
- UK Parliament: Scunthorpe

East Butterwick is a village and civil parish in North Lincolnshire, England. It lies in the Isle of Axholme, about 4 miles (6 km) north-east from Epworth and 4 miles north from Owston Ferry, on the eastern bank of the River Trent opposite its neighbour West Butterwick. The population of the civil parish as at the 2011 census was 135.
