= Haxey Hood =

Traditional event throughout the civil parish of Haxey, North Lincolnshire

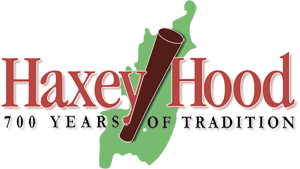
- First played: 14th century, Haxey, Lincolnshire

Characteristics
- Contact: Contact

The Haxey Hood is a traditional event in Haxey, North Lincolnshire, England. It consists of a game in which a large rugby scrum (the "sway") pushes a leather tube (the "hood") to one of four pubs in the town, where it remains until the following year's game. The game is played on 6 January, the Twelfth Day of Christmas (unless the 6th falls on a Sunday, in which case the event is held on the Saturday).

== History ==
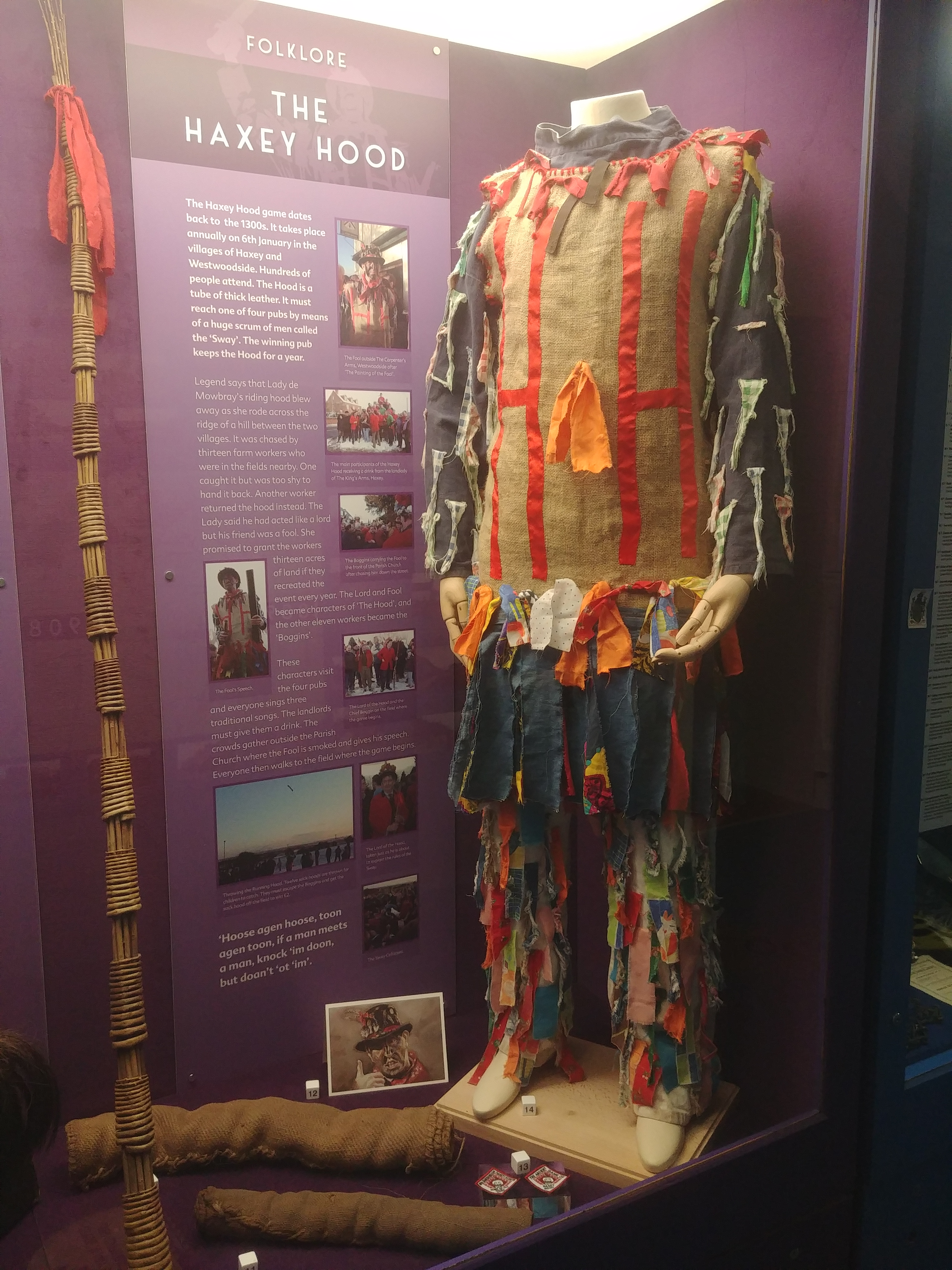
Haxey Hood display (North Lincolnshire Museum)

Haxey, Upperthorpe and Westwoodside lie in an area of North Lincolnshire known as the Isle of Axholme. The official story is that in the 14th century, Lady de Mowbray, wife of an Isle landowner, John De Mowbray, was out riding towards Westwoodside on the hill that separates it from Haxey. As she went over the hill her silk riding hood was blown away by the wind. Thirteen farm workers in the field rushed to help and chased the hood all over the field. It was finally caught by one of the farm workers, but being too shy to hand it back to the lady, he gave it to one of the others to hand back to her. She thanked the farm worker who had returned the hood and said that he had acted like a Lord, whereas the worker who had actually caught the hood was a Fool. So amused was she by this act of chivalry and the resulting chase, that she donated 13 acres (53,000 m^{2}) of land on condition that the chase for the hood would be re-enacted each year. This re-enactment over the centuries has become known as "The Haxey Hood".

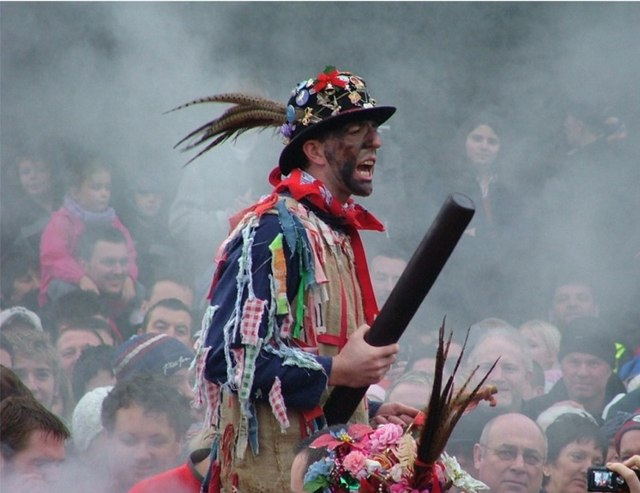
The Fool's Speech

In folklore, when a custom is too old for its origins to be remembered, a story is often devised to rationalise what would otherwise be baffling. However the "official" story of the Hood's origins is not that unlikely. Others have noted possible similarities between the Hood and hoods worn by bog burials in Northern Europe and noted that the game takes place on the border of bogs where naturally-preserved mummies of supposed prehistoric sacrifices have been found. However, hoods have been found on deposited bodies in Scandinavia but not in Britain or in Ireland.

The nobles mentioned in the story did exist. Records show that John De Mowbray (29 November 1310 – 4 October 1361), the 3rd Baron Mowbray of Axholme, would be the most likely candidate for the husband of the lady. This would date the Hood to about 1359 when a deed granting land to commoners was enacted by the baron. This would make the Hood around 650 years old, making it likely to be the oldest surviving tradition in England.

It has similarities to other village combats, such as Ashbourne's Royal Shrovetide Football, the Shrove Tuesday Football Games in Sedgefield, Durham and Alnwick, Northumberland and the Hallaton Bottle Kicking contest in Leicestershire.

The song "Drink Old England Dry" (Roud 882) is associated with the hood and has only rarely been recorded elsewhere.

== Preparations ==
In the weeks before the event, the Fool and the Boggins tour nearby villages in order to collect money (traditionally to pay for the event, but now to raise money for local charities). Traditionally they sing a number of well-known folk songs including "John Barleycorn", "Cannons (Drink England Dry)" and "The Farmer's Boy". All wear their full festival costumes, the only exception being that the Fool's face is not marked.

At 12 noon, work in the parish comes to a standstill and people start to make their way to Haxey village to gather and take part in the traditional ritual. At about 12:30 the officials start a tour of the ale houses involved, and drink free drinks at each pub, provided by the landlord as a token of good luck to try to bring the Hood its way. Many people follow this tour and consider it a vital part of the day. They start at the Carpenters Arms where they sing the traditional folk songs and ceremoniously paint the Fool's face. Then they move to the Kings Arms and then up towards the church, taking in the Loco and the Duke William on the way, drinking and singing as they go. Around 2:30 pm the officials leave the Duke and process up to the church.

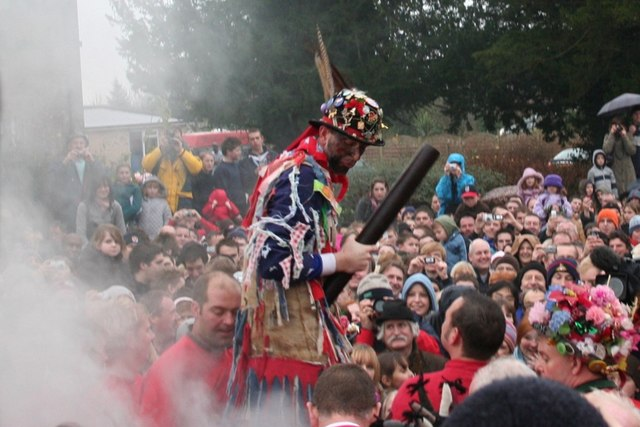
Smoking the Fool

The Fool leads the procession and has the right to kiss any woman on the way. Once at the green in front of the Parish Church, at around 2:30, the Fool makes his traditional speech of welcome standing on an old mounting block in front of the church known as the Mowbray Stone. During this speech a fire is lit with damp straw behind him. The smoke rises up and around him and this is known as "Smoking the Fool". This is a watered-down version of the earlier custom (abandoned at the beginning of the 20th century due to its obvious danger) in which a more substantial fire was lit with damp straw beneath a tree. The Fool was then suspended over the fire and swung back and forth until he was almost suffocated before being cut down and dropped into the fire, from where he had to make his escape as best he could. The Fool finishes his speech with the traditional words that the crowd chant along with him. They are: "hoose agen hoose, toon agen toon, if a man meets a man knock 'im doon, but doan't 'ot 'im," which translates as: "house against house, town against town, if a man meets a man, knock him down but don't hurt him."

The Towns mentioned are the villages of Westwoodside and Haxey, and Houses are the public houses (pubs) of those villages. The pubs are:

- The Carpenters Arms – Newbigg, Westwoodside
- Duke William – Church Street, Haxey
- The Loco – 31 Church Street, Haxey
- The Kings Arms – Low Street, Haxey

After the speech, the Fool leads the crowd to the middle of a field where the game is to be played.

== Venue ==
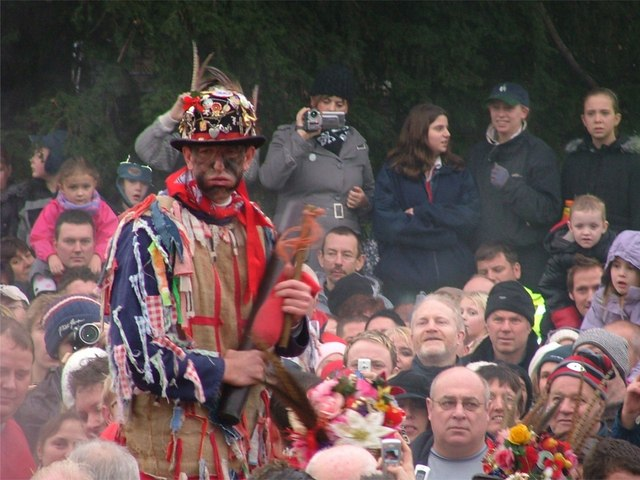
The Fool

Haxey is a large parish on the southern border of the Isle of Axholme. It consists of the villages of Haxey and Westwoodside with the hamlets of High Burnham, Low Burnham, East Lound and Graizelound. In earlier days, Westwoodside was divided into Park, Newbigg, Nethergate, Upperthorpe (or Overthorpe) and Commonside.

== Playing the game ==
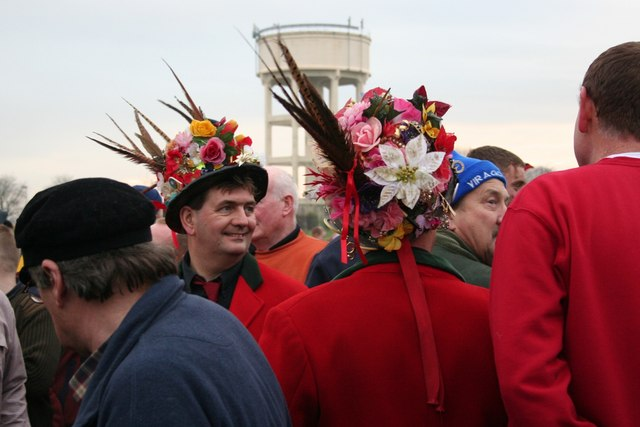
Lord of the Hood and Chief Boggin

The thirteen characters from the original story are represented as follows: there is the Lord, the Fool and eleven Boggins, one of the Boggins being the chief Boggin.

The Lord and chief Boggin are dressed in hunting pink (red) coats and top hats decorated with flowers and badges. The Lord also carries his wand of office. This is a staff made from twelve willow wands with one more upside down in the centre. These are bound thirteen times with willow twigs and a red ribbon at the top. The thirteen willow wands are supposed to represent the twelve apostles and the upside down one represents Judas. The staff is supposed to represent the sword and the blood from when the game was played with a bullock's head after it had been slaughtered. The Fool has multi-coloured strips of material attached to his trousers and top. He wears a feathered hat decorated with flowers and rags, and his face is smeared with soot and red ochre. He carries a whip and sock filled with bran, with which he belabours anyone who comes within reach. The remaining ten Boggins wear red jumpers. The game is played by locals, although anyone can join in. There are no official teams, but everyone involved tries to push the Hood towards their favoured pub.

Proceedings start at around 3pm with the throwing of twelve Sack Hoods. These are rolled hessian sacks sewn up to prevent them unrolling. This is a prequel to the main game, mainly for children. The youngsters in the crowd run for them when thrown and attempt to get them off the field. If they are tackled then they must immediately throw it in the air unless the challenger is a Boggin in which case the hood is ‘boggined’ and it is returned to the Lord who starts it off again.

The first two or three of these are stopped by the Boggins on the edge of the field and the hoods returned to the Lord. After a while the Boggins let the Sack Hoods be taken off the field in which case they can be returned later for a cash reward, currently five pounds.

After this bit of fun to warm up the crowd the Sway Hood is then thrown up in the air. The rugby type scrum (or Sway to give it its official title) then converges on the Hood and the game starts in earnest. The idea is to get the Sway Hood into one of the four pubs in either Haxey or Westwoodside.

The Hood, which cannot be thrown or run with, is moved slowly by 'swaying', that is pushing and pulling the Hood and people within the 'Sway' toward the direction of their pub. Although everyone is trying to push in a particular direction, there are no real organised teams. The Sway makes very slow progress, as it snakes around, stopping quite often when it collapses, in order to pull bodies out, that became crushed into the mud. Safety is of prime concern and the whole thing is supervised by the Boggins. The Lord is referee and sees that the game is played fairly. At any one time there are usually around 200 people in the Sway and about one thousand people watching. Games can last anything from a couple of hours onwards and have been known to go on well into the night. Everything in the path of the Sway goes down before it, including hedges and walls. Another of the Boggins' jobs is to stop the Sway destroying everything in its path.

Nobody parks on the roads where the Sway may go, and with good reason. In 2002, a couple of drivers parked opposite the Duke William. The Sway headed right for them and pushed one of the cars 10 feet down the road and into the other.

The game ends when the Hood arrives at one of the pubs and is touched by the landlord from his front step. The landlord then takes charge of the Hood for the year, and is supposed to give everyone a free drink. The winning pub pours beer over the Hood and then hangs it behind the bar (each pub has two hooks especially for this purpose). According to legend, it used to be roasted on a spit over the pub fire having been doused with ale, which was then drunk by those present.

The Hood hangs in the winning pub until New Year's Eve when it is collected by the Boggins in time for the next game.

== Winners since 2000 ==
Year	Pub	Time taken	Comments
2026	Carpenters Arms	~2:00	
2025	The Loco		666th running
2024	Kings Arms		
2023	The Loco	~2:00	
2022	-	-	Cancelled due to COVID-19 Pandemic
2021	-	-	Cancelled due to COVID-19 Pandemic
2020	Kings Arms		
2019	Carpenters Arms	~3:00	The hill played a massive part again in this year's Haxey hood, with Frankie dominating throughout. Haxey were unable to break through the barrier that the carps created.
2018	Carpenters Arms	~2:00	As soon as the hood started to move up the hill it was clear it was going to Westwoodside. The hood continued towards the Carpenters Arms with little resistance offered by Haxey.
2017	Kings Arms		
2016	Carpenters Arms	2:00	It was obvious from the start there was a determined effort this year to move the sway in a westerly direction. It never made any progress towards Haxey, moving instead north onto Upperthorpe Road, then west towards Westwoodside. The organisers attempted to divert it back down onto Tower Hill via Mill Lane, but the sway cannot be corralled so easily; it merely continued down Upperthorpe before turning south at Gollards Lane. The Haxey supporters continued to offer token resistance to the last, even making a final stand right outside the Carpenters Arms; creating a few difficulties for the landlord trying to grab the hood from the sway in his doorway.
2015	The Loco	1:35	After a ten-year wait, the hood finally returned to the Loco. Starting at 15:50, the hood initially looked as if it were going to Westwoodside. However once it got over the brow of the hill, there was only one place it was headed as it raced past the Duke William. Loco landlord Jamie Bentham eagerly took the hood from the Sway, as the crowd cheered. A record time in perfect conditions.
2014	Kings Arms	2:05	A fast hood on a very mild and well attended weekday.
2013	Kings Arms	2:55	With the event falling on a Saturday, locals described the attendance as one of the best they have ever seen. And with conditions near perfect for early January, the sway got off to a quick start across the fields. Battle for control of the Hood lasted three and half hours in 2012, but this year the game seemed to be up after just two. Brief resistance outside Haxey was quickly overcome and the Hood rolled past The Loco and the Duke William, last year's winner. The exhausted sway then drove the Hood on to The Kings Arms for a glorious victory in just under three hours, with the pub already packed to the rafters with cheering patrons.
2012	Duke William	3:30	The Duke William pub in Haxey took the hood for the first time since 2003, after a long struggle in the bitter January cold.
2011	Carpenters Arms	3:35	Once over the hill and onto the road, the Haxey boys accepted defeat; it was then an easy push down to Westwoodside.
2010	Kings Arms	1:35	The Kings Arms took the hood for the third year on the trot in an easy win.
2009	Kings Arms	??:??	The Kings Arms take the title for the second year running, gaining possession of the hood at a respectable 18:23.
2008	Kings Arms	3:48	A late start to the hood saw the main event commencing at 15:50. Both Haxey and Westwoodside supporters were out in force, ensuring that the Sway stayed on the field for over two hours and only made it to the main road at 18:00. After another 15 minutes battle, the sway was soon moving towards Haxey, stopping only momentarily at Church Lane, where a defiant counterattack by Westwoodside occurred at 18:30. This was soon over and the Sway glided virtually unhindered past the Duke William at 18:35 and the Loco at around 18:50. Once past the Loco progress was reasonably swift ending at the Kings Arms with the landlady taking possession at 19:38.
2007	Carpenters Arms	4:00	Westwoodside supporters struggled to get the hood pushed over the hill into Westwoodside, but once done it quickly went down to the Carpenter's Arms, a journey lasting about four hours altogether.
2006	Kings Arms	??:??	The hood made its way slowly towards Haxey, and there was a brief pause whilst outside the Duke William; once it was passed through, there was no real attempt to stop the hood going to the Kings.
2005	The Loco	??:??	The Hood entered the Loco via the side door. The door opened outwards and was subsequently sheared off under the weight of the sway.
2004	Kings Arms	??:??	????
2003	Duke William	1:50	For over an hour the Sway went nowhere, but then a concerted effort made it move to the road and on its way to Haxey. It lingered around the Duke William for about 30 minutes while a fierce battle took place over whether it should pass the Duke or not. At one point it actually passed the Duke on the other side of the road, but after several stops it finally headed backwards and to the other side of the road and eventually to the Duke.
2002	Kings Arms	2:15	The Hood made a very fast journey to the Kings Arms. It took 2 hours and 15 minutes—the same time it took just to reach the Duke William the year before.
2001	Duke William	2:15	
2000	Carpenters Arms	??:??	
1991	Kings Arms	??:??	
1977	Duke William	??:??	

== See also ==
- English folklore
