= Graizelound =

Hamlet in the civil parish of Haxey in North Lincolnshire, England

Coordinates: 53.479721°N 0.83843708°W

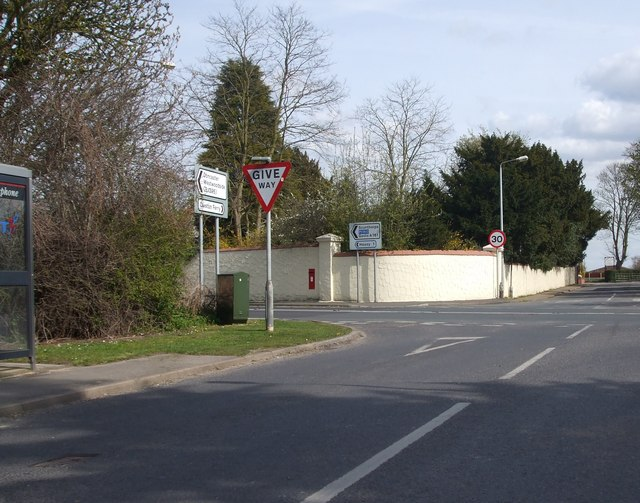
- Crossroads at the centre of Graizelound

- Location within Lincolnshire
- OS grid reference: SK771987
  - London: 130 mi (210 km) S
- Unitary authority: North Lincolnshire
- Ceremonial county: Lincolnshire
- Region: Yorkshire and the Humber
- Country: England
- Sovereign state: United Kingdom
- Post town: DONCASTER
- Postcode district: DN9
- Dialling code: 01427
- Police: Humberside
- Fire: Humberside
- Ambulance: East Midlands

Graizelound is a hamlet in the civil parish of Haxey in North Lincolnshire, England. It is approximately 22 miles (35 km) to the north-west of Lincoln, and centred on the crossroad junction of Haxey Lane, Station Road, Akeferry Road and Ferry Road. The town of Haxey is 1 mile (1.6 km) to the north. Owston Ferry on the River Trent is 3 miles (4.8 km) to the north-east. Graizelound forms part of the Isle of Axholme.

== History ==
According to A Dictionary of British Place Names, the 'lound' in Graizelound derives from the Old Scandinavian 'lundr' for "a small wood or grove". Graizelound is recorded in the 1086 Domesday Book as "Lund", being a name for both the later East Lound and Graizelound, in the hundred of Epworth and the West Riding of Lindsey. The settlement contained ten households, four villagers, four freemen, two tributaries, 0.6 ploughlands, 3.5 men's plough teams, and a fishery. The lords of the manor in 1066 were Alnoth and Ulf Fenman. Following Domesday, lordship was given to Geoffrey de La Guerche who was also Tenant-in-chief to King William I.

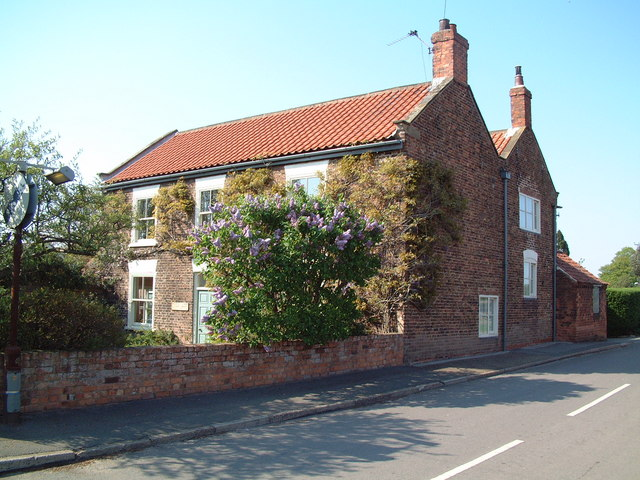
Manor House, Grade II listed

Graizelound is recorded in the 1872 White's Directory as a hamlet of Haxey parish with a list of occupations and residents that included thirty farmers, two of whom were also shopkeepers, a joiner & wheelwright, a blacksmith, a shoemaker, and an occupant of a day school. At Cumberworth Lodge lived Thomas Wharton Emerson, and at Sobraon Lodge, Captain William Henry Emerson, who were brothers, and nephews to Sir Wharton Amcotts, 1st Baronet of Kettlethorpe Hall.

Cumberworth Lodge on Ferry Road (Main Street), is today a care home, and is a Grade II listed rendered brick building that dates to the mid-18th-century. Further Grade II listed buildings are the 18th-century red brick Lound House on Main Street, and on Graizelound Fields Roads, Manor House, of brown brick built in 1791, and the early 19th-century red brick Croft House.
