= Upperthorpe =

Upperthorpe may refer to one of these places in England:

- Upperthorpe, Derbyshire
- Upperthorpe, Lincolnshire
- Upperthorpe, Sheffield, a suburb of Sheffield
