= East Lound =

Hamlet in the civil parish of Haxey in North Lincolnshire, England

Coordinates: 53.488812°N 0.815701°W

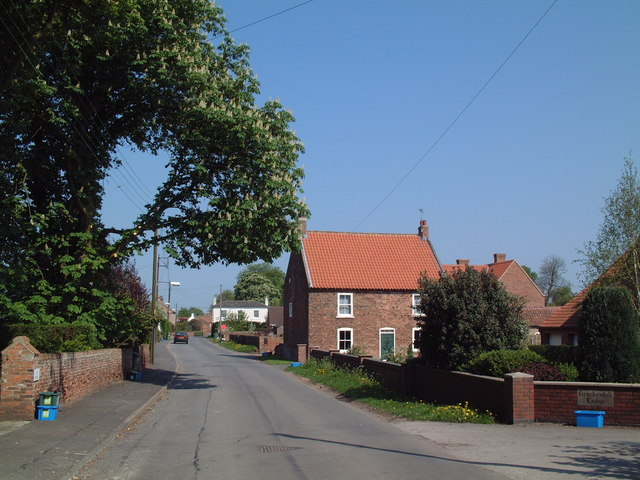
- East Lound

- Location within Lincolnshire
- OS grid reference: SK786997
  - London: 130 mi (210 km) S
- Unitary authority: North Lincolnshire
- Ceremonial county: Lincolnshire
- Region: Yorkshire and the Humber
- Country: England
- Sovereign state: United Kingdom
- Post town: DONCASTER
- Postcode district: DN9
- Dialling code: 01427
- Police: Humberside
- Fire: Humberside
- Ambulance: East Midlands

East Lound is a hamlet in the civil parish of Haxey in North Lincolnshire, England. It is situated approximately 22 miles (35 km) to the north-west from Lincoln, and on Brackenhill Road within the parish of Haxey, a town around 1 mile (1.6 km) to the west. Owston Ferry on the River Trent is 2 miles (3.2 km) to the east. East Lound forms part of the Isle of Axholme.

== History ==
East Lound is recorded in the 1086 Domesday Book as "Lund", being a name for both the later East Lound and Graizelound, and under both the entry for Haxey and Owston Ferry in the hundred of Epworth. The lord of the manor following Domesday was Geoffrey of la Guerche, who was also Tenant-in-chief to King William I.

In 1855 East Lound occupations included fifteen farmers, two wheelwrights, and a shopkeeper who was also a shoemaker. By 1885 the number of farmers had reduced to twelve and there was only one wheelwright. In 1933 there were ten farmers and a smallholder, a seed grower, and one shop with two shopkeepers. A Primitive Methodist chapel was built at East Lound in 1862, and was closed in 1958.
