= Burton upon Stather =

Village and civil parish in North Lincolnshire, England

Coordinates: 53.64941°N 0.68485°W

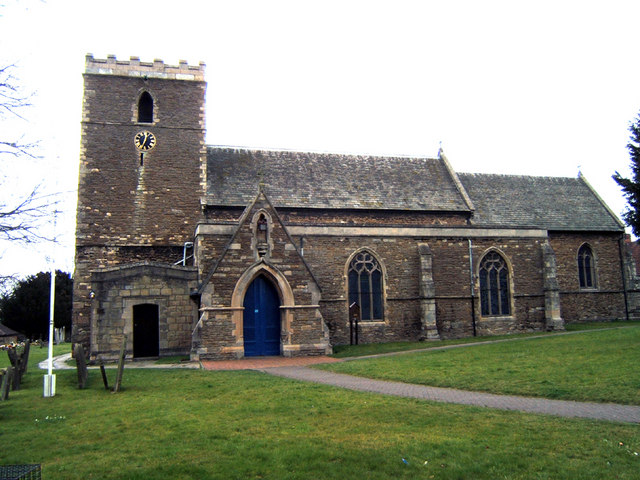
- Church of St Andrew, Burton upon Stather

- Location within Lincolnshire
- Population: 2,753 (2011 Census)
- OS grid reference: SE875175
  - London: 150 mi (240 km) S
- Unitary authority: North Lincolnshire
- Ceremonial county: Lincolnshire
- Region: Yorkshire and the Humber
- Country: England
- Sovereign state: United Kingdom
- Post town: Scunthorpe
- Postcode district: DN15
- Dialling code: 01724
- Police: Humberside
- Fire: Humberside
- Ambulance: East Midlands
- UK Parliament: Scunthorpe

Burton upon Stather, also hyphenated as Burton-upon-Stather, is a village and civil parish in North Lincolnshire, England. The village is situated 5 miles (8 km) north from Scunthorpe, and is near the east bank of the River Trent. The civil parish consists of Burton upon Stather and the hamlets of Normanby and Thealby; its population at 2001 was 2,737.

== History ==
The name Burton is an Old English word meaning "fortified farm" and Stather is Old Norse, meaning a landing-stage.

Up to 1914, the river landing was used as a calling place by steamers between Gainsborough and Hull.

A large slipway of concrete and wood to the north of Burton Stather was built in 1944 by the 79th Armoured Division (United Kingdom). It was used for testing and training with amphibious Duplex Drive tanks during the Second World War.

In 2009 a voluntary group was set up to protect, restore and provide access to the old Tank Ramp on the River Trent.

== Community ==
The Grade I listed Anglican parish church is dedicated to St Andrew. It was initially built in 1160, and had a tower added in 1230. The church was restored and altered in 1865, and restored again in 1889; remaining features are Perpendicular. There are monuments saved and removed from Owston resited within the church: an effigy of a knight with sword brought from Boston, a cannonball from the Battle of Solebay, and many monuments of the Sheffield family.

Burton Playing Fields is a section of land on the outskirts of the village, with facilities including a children's play area, a basketball court, various sports fields and a pavilion. It is also used for training and play by various local football teams.

== See also ==
- Burton, Lincolnshire, a civil parish just outside Lincoln
