= West Butterwick =

Village and civil parish in North Lincolnshire, England

Coordinates: 53.542663°N 0.743358°W

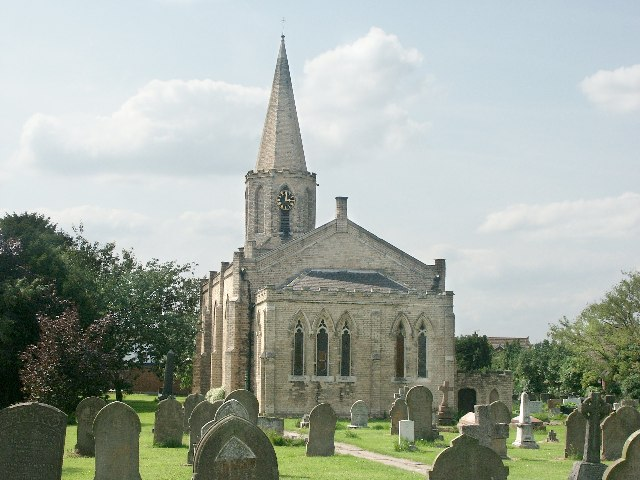
- St Mary's church, West Butterwick

- Location within Lincolnshire
- Population: 795 (2011)
- OS grid reference: SE 83370 05848
  - London: 145 mi (233 km) S
- Unitary authority: North Lincolnshire
- Ceremonial county: Lincolnshire
- Region: Yorkshire and the Humber
- Country: England
- Sovereign state: United Kingdom
- Post town: Scunthorpe
- Postcode district: DN17
- Police: Humberside
- Fire: Humberside
- Ambulance: East Midlands
- UK Parliament: Doncaster East and the Isle of Axholme

West Butterwick is a village and civil parish in North Lincolnshire, England. It lies in the Isle of Axholme, approximately 4 miles (6 km) north-east from Epworth and 4 miles north from Owston Ferry, on the western bank of the River Trent opposite its neighbour East Butterwick.

The name 'Butterwick' comes from the Old English butere-wick meaning 'butter farm'.

West Butterwick Grade II listed Anglican parish church is dedicated to St Mary. It was built in 1841 of beige brick, with a thin octagonal west tower. A further Grade II listed building is The Old Vicarage, built in 1863 by James Fowler of Louth. An 1824 listed windmill tower is at Mill Farm on North Street.

In 1885 Kelly's Directory recorded a Primitive Methodist and a General Baptist chapel. Within a parish area of 2,307 acres (9 km^{2}) were grown potatoes, wheat, oats and beans.

Originally a township in Owston parish, West Butterwick was made an ecclesiastical parish in its own right in 1841.

The 2001 Census found 776 people in 312 households, increasing to a population of 795 in 341 households at the 2011 census.
