= Selion =

Small acre-size lot for farming in medieval societies

A selion is a medieval open strip of land or a small field used for growing crops, usually owned by or rented to peasants. A selion of land was typically one furlong (660 ft) long and one chain (66 ft) wide, so one acre in area. However exact measurements could vary depending on the geography of the land. Monasteries or similar institutions were often bequeathed selions and derived an income by letting them.

== Relationship to strip farming ==
A strip of land consisted of one, two or three selions, although Rackham reports that a strip might be "a block of up to forty selions".
