= Beltoft =

Hamlet in the civil parish of Belton, North Lincolnshire, England

Coordinates: 53°32′N 0°47′W

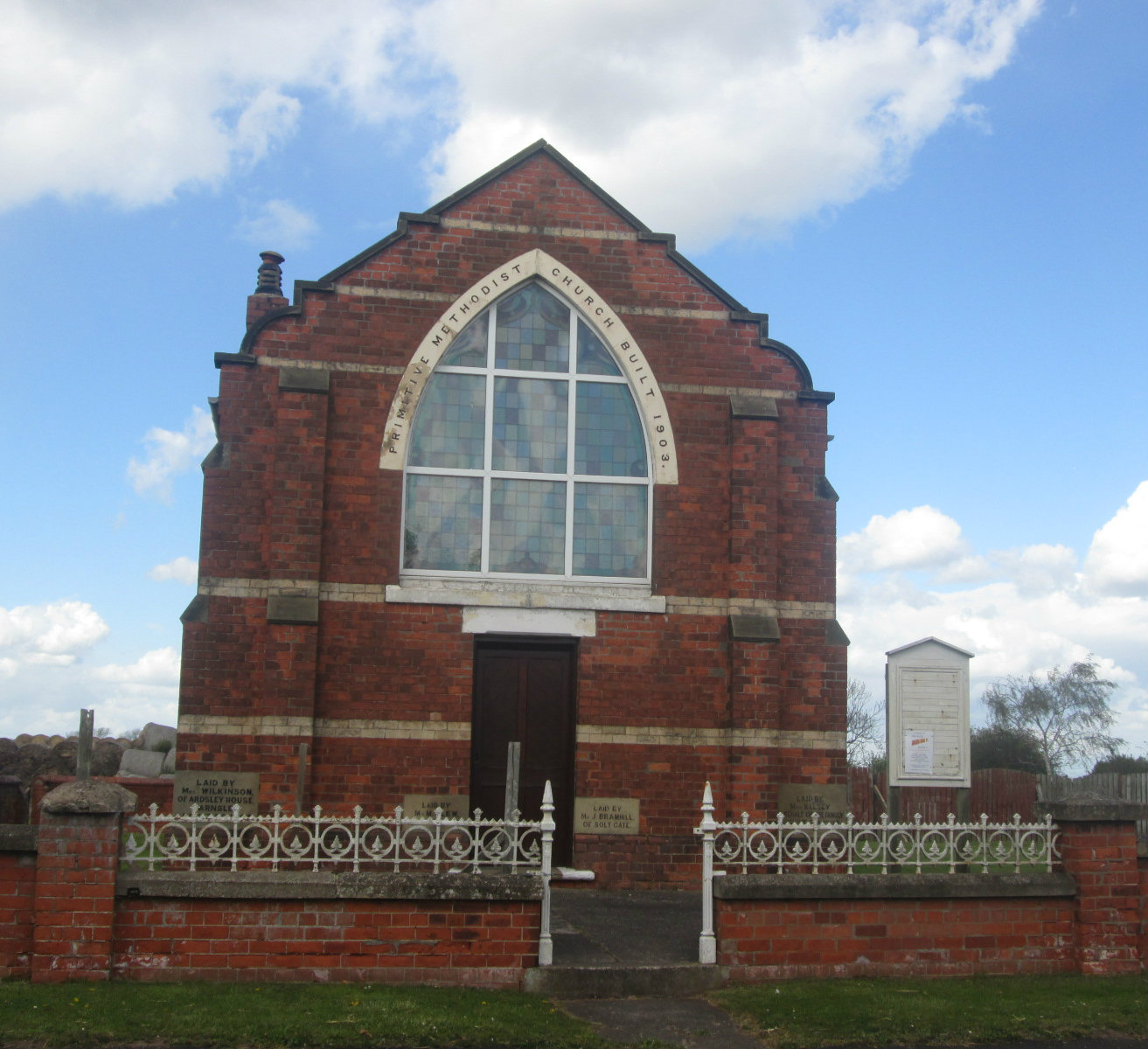
- The Methodist Chapel in Beltoft

- Location within Lincolnshire
- Population: 150
- OS grid reference: SE8006
  - London: 140 mi (230 km) S
- Unitary authority: North Lincolnshire
- Ceremonial county: Lincolnshire
- Region: Yorkshire and the Humber
- Country: England
- Sovereign state: United Kingdom
- Post town: Doncaster
- Postcode district: DN9
- Police: Humberside
- Fire: Humberside
- Ambulance: East Midlands

Beltoft is a hamlet in the civil parish of Belton, North Lincolnshire, England. The village lies within the Isle of Axholme and is 4 miles (6 km) south-east of Crowle.

There is a gas offtake from the National Transmission System at Beltoft, which is run by Scottish Power. It is connected by a 9.3-mile (15.0 km) pipeline to a gas compression station on Hatfield Moor, which pumps gas into a depleted natural gas field located 1,450 feet (440 m) below the moor. When more gas is required, the gas is extracted again, and re-enters the National Transmission System at Beltoft.

The only public building in the village is the Methodist Chapel. In the 18th century, the Quakers were quite active in the area and had their own burial ground in the village. This site was reused by the Methodists, who built the first chapel there in 1833. That building was demolished, and a new chapel was built in 1904, and the premises were extended in 1923, when a Sunday School was added. The building sits on a wide plot, with a grassed area to the east of it, which was the former burial ground.

Beltoft was one of the first villages to benefit from the third phase of the Northern Lincs Broadband initiative, a programme designed to ensure that rural communities were not left out in the provision of super-fast and ultra-fast broadband services. The multi-million-pound programme uses Fibre to the premises (FTTP) technology, which involves running fibre-optic cables from the telephone exchange into the business premises or homes of customers. Many other parts of North Lincolnshire will have a Fibre-to-the-Cabinet (FTTC) service, which provides super-fast broadband but not the ultra-fast service available in Beltoft. The scheme is funded by North Lincolnshire Council and benefitted from £2.9 million saved by efficiencies during the first phase of the programme.
