= Highland carrier =

In the field of land drainage, a highland carrier is a watercourse that conveys drainage water coming from higher in the catchment across or around a lower, drained area of land, but has little or no connection with the drainage network of that drained area. Such a carrier is enclosed by levees.
