= Haxey =

Town and parish in North Lincolnshire, England

Coordinates: 53.486838°N 0.846189°W

- Town and civil parish
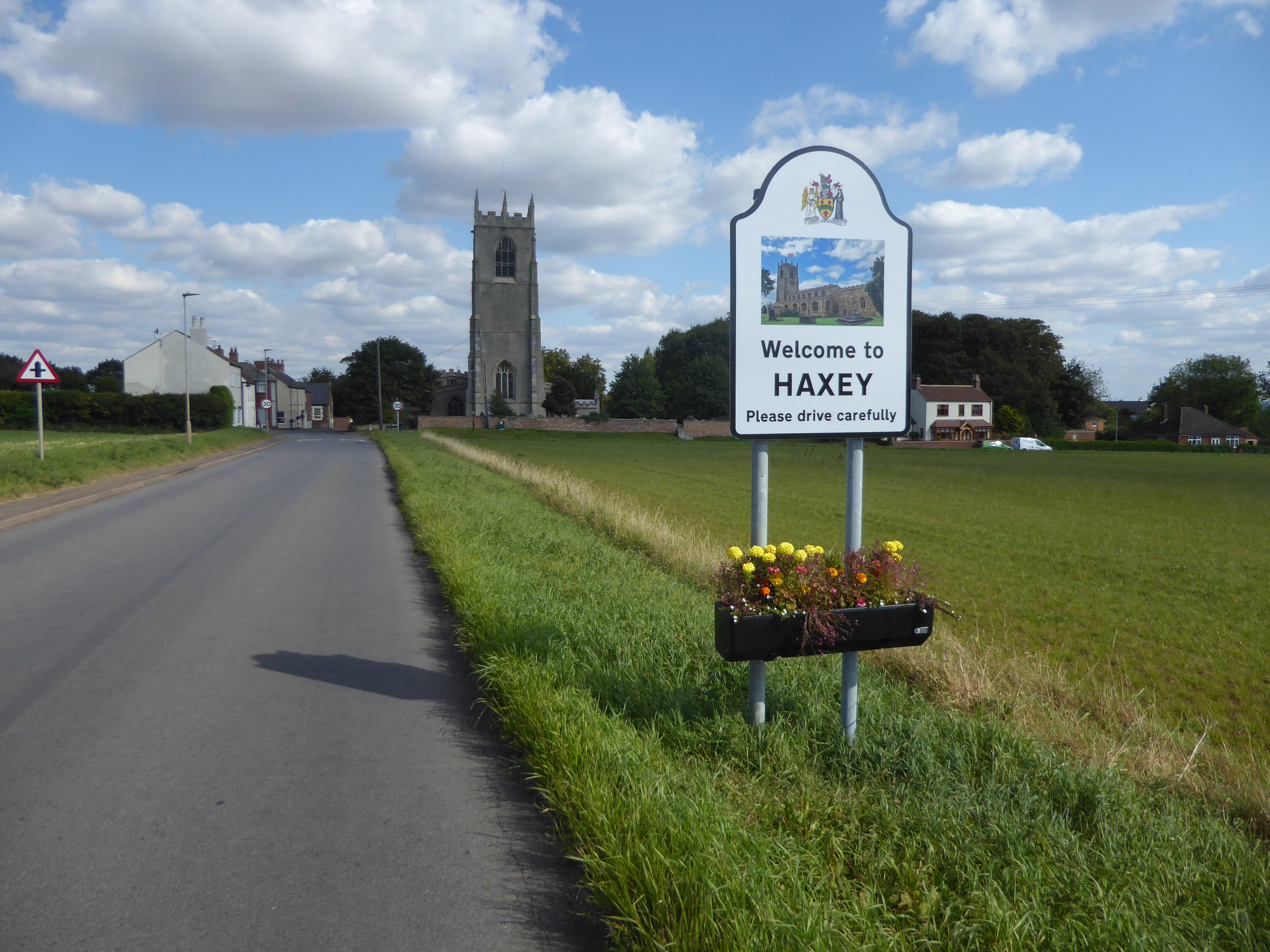
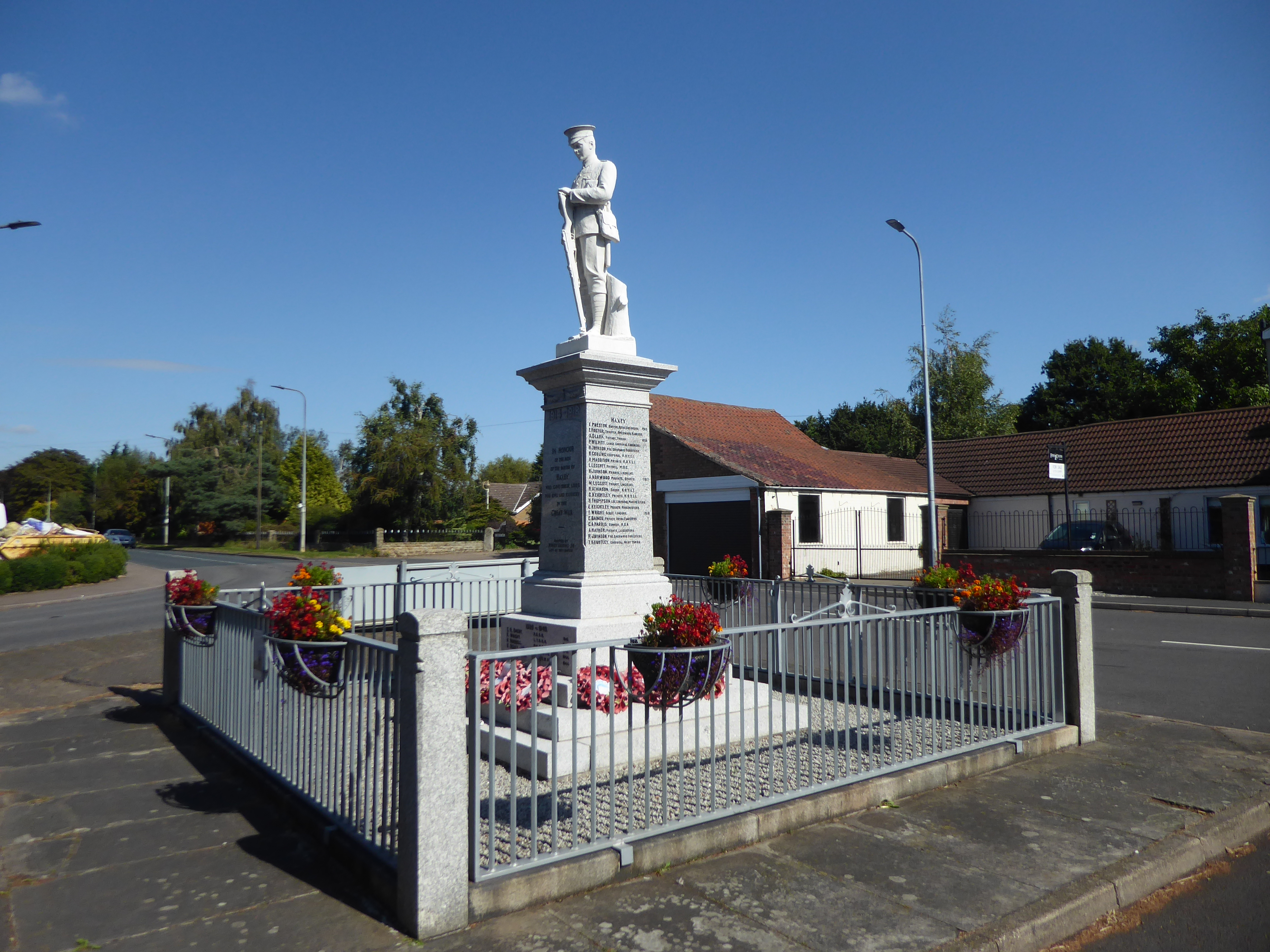
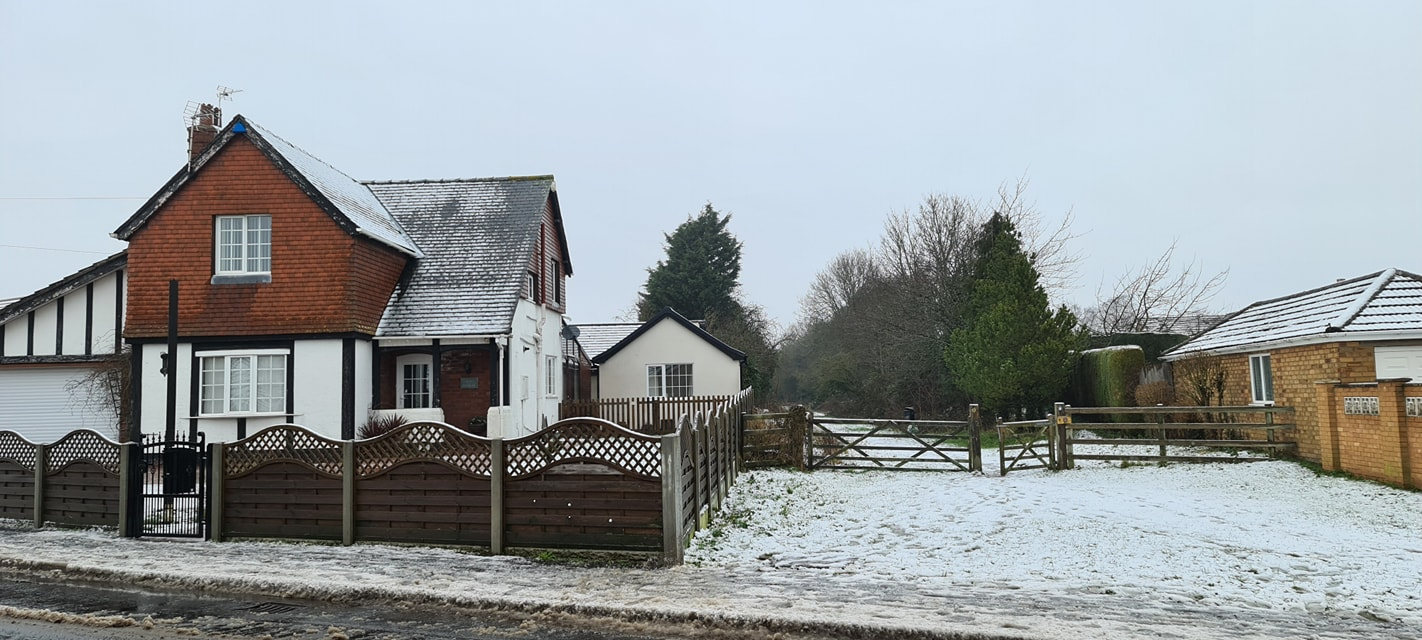
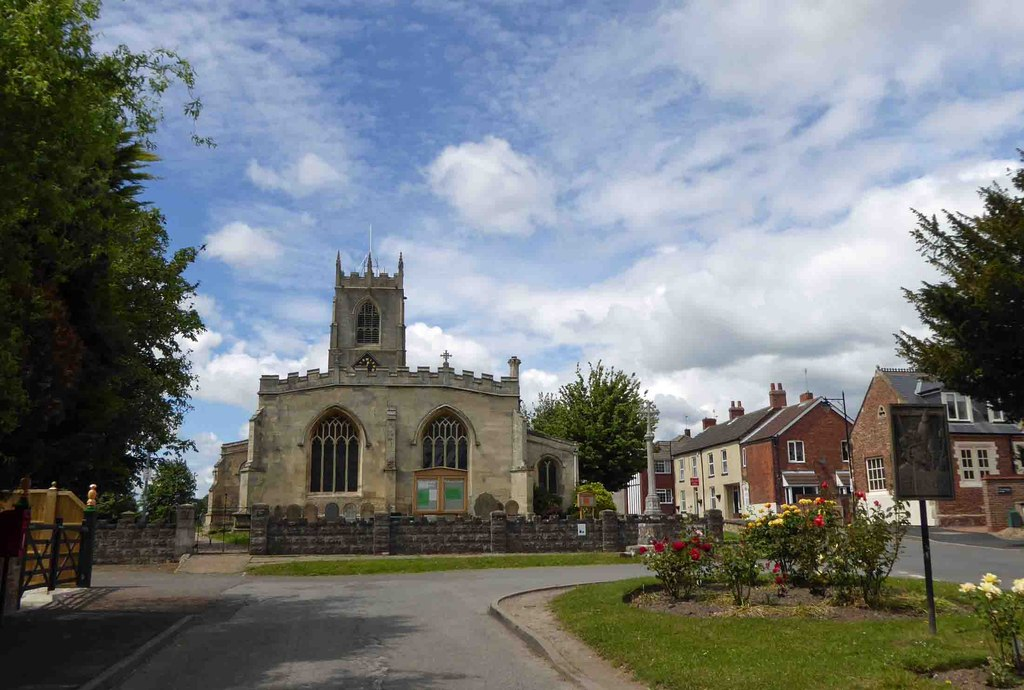
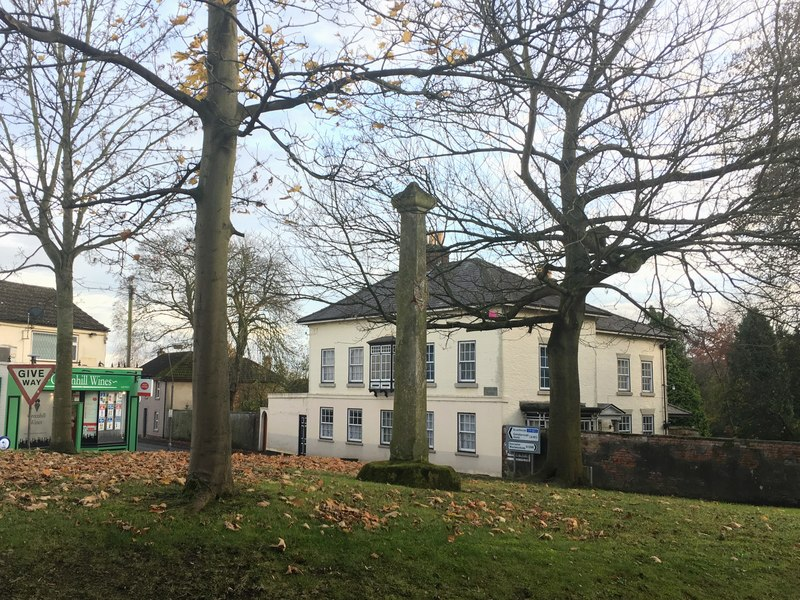
- From the top, Haxey Tower Hill, Old railway station, The Cross, St Nicholas Church and War Memorial

- Location within Lincolnshire
- Area: 13.92 sq mi (36.1 km^{2})
- Population: 4,485 (2021 census)
  - Density: 322/sq mi (124/km^{2})
- OS grid reference: SK765995
  - London: 130 mi (210 km) S
- Unitary authority: North Lincolnshire
- Ceremonial county: Lincolnshire
- Region: Yorkshire and the Humber
- Country: England
- Sovereign state: United Kingdom
- Areas of the town: List: East Lound; Graizelound; Haxey Carr; High Burnham; Low Burnham; Owston Ferry; Upperthorpe; Westwoodside
- Post town: DONCASTER
- Postcode district: DN9
- Dialling code: 01427
- Police: Humberside
- Fire: Humberside
- Ambulance: East Midlands
- UK Parliament: Doncaster East and the Isle of Axholme
- Website: www.haxeyparishcouncil.gov.uk

Haxey is a town and civil parish on the Isle of Axholme in the North Lincolnshire unitary authority of Lincolnshire, England. It is directly south of Epworth, south-west of Scunthorpe, north-west of Gainsborough, east of Doncaster and north-north-west of Lincoln, with a population of 4,584 at the 2011 census. The town was regarded as the historic capital of the Isle of Axholme.

Haxey lies between the villages of Westwoodside and Owston Ferry, part of the Isle of Axholme, and is notable for Haxey Hood, a local event with over 700 years of history.

== Geography ==
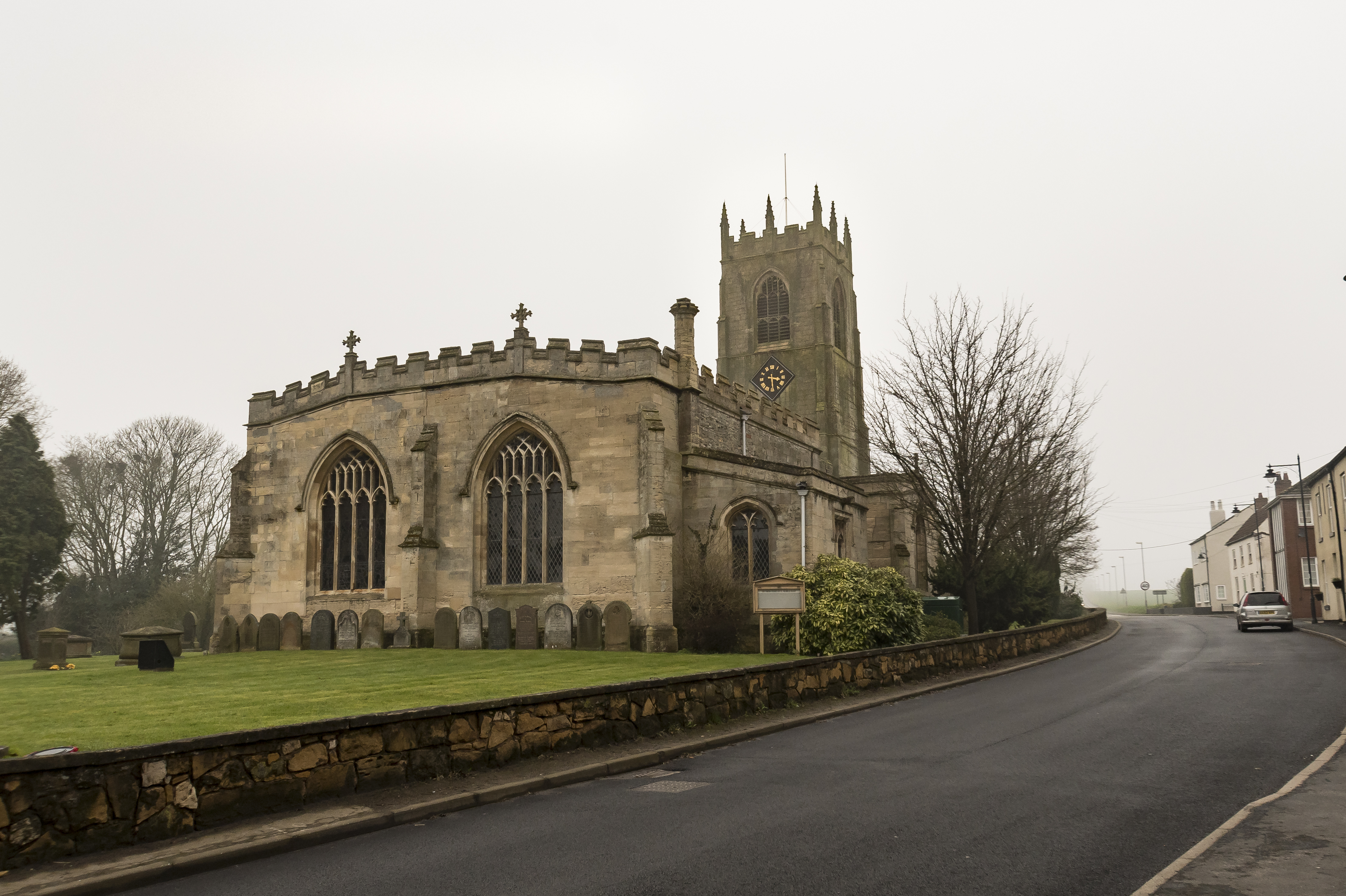
St Nicholas’s Church, Haxey

Haxey is on a series of low-lying hills that reach a maximum height of 133 feet (41 m) out of the surrounding marshland. The River Trent lies to the east, beyond Owston Ferry.

The civil parish includes the town of Haxey and the village of Westwoodside, and the hamlets of Haxey Carr, High Burnham (the highest elevation of the Isle of Axholme), Low Burnham, East Lound, Graizelound and Upperthorpe which is conjoined to Westwoodside.

== Community ==
Haxey, previously the capital of the Isle of Axholme, was destroyed by fire in 1741.

The town's Grade I listed Anglican parish church, dedicated to Saint Nicholas, originates from the 12th and 13th centuries. It mainly consists of Perpendicular Gothic architecture. The tower is of three stages, with an embattled parapet. Piers of the north arcade are Norman, and those of the south, with the chancel arch and chantry chapel, mainly Early English.

Haxey has a Church of England primary school and a private day nursery.

The town contains three public houses, The Duke William, The Loco, and The King's Arms, two convenience stores, a doctor's surgery, and a local estate agency. Lincolnshire Co-op opened a £1.2 million store in 2013 to some local opposition over the loss of town character and other businesses. In 2018, an application was submitted to demolish the Duke William pub – which was subsequently revised to retain the frontage of the historic building housing the pub.

Thomas Buckle was born here in 1886. He is known throughout the area as the original champion of the Haxey Hood. There is a plaque in the local pub The King's Arms dedicated to his efforts, as well as a small charity-run museum located near the church, the site of his original home.

== Demographics ==
According to the 2021 Census, the population of the town was recorded at 4,485 which makes it one of the most populous settlements on the Isle of Axholme. The demographic makeup of the town was recorded at 98.2% White British, followed by 1% British Asian, 0.5% Mixed Race and 0.3% Black British and other ethnics. Christianity is the largest practiced religion in the town at 66.3%, with irreligious at 32.5% and Islam at 0.7%. Other religions and faiths were recorded at less than 0.5% of the population of the town.

== Transport ==
Haxey is served by buses provided by Isle Coaches, Stagecoach Buses and First South Yorkshire which give the town services to towns like Doncaster, Scunthorpe and Epworth. The town was served by three railway stations. The central one was Haxey Town on the Axholme Joint Railway which ran from Goole to Lincoln via a connecting spur to the Doncaster to Lincoln Line. The station closed to passengers in 1933 and the line closed to freight and excursion services in 1956. The site forms a trail between Belton and Haxey. Another station was opened north on the Doncaster to Lincoln Line on the outskirts of the town. It closed in 1933 too. However, the other station named Haxey and Epworth closed in 1964 lasting longer than the previous stations. The nearest mainline stations are now in the nearby towns of Crowle and Gainsborough Lea Road.

== Media ==
Television signals can be received from either the Belmont or Emley Moor TV transmitters. The town is served by both BBC Radio Sheffield and BBC Radio Humberside, BBC Radio Lincolnshire can also be received. Other radio stations are Greatest Hits Radio Yorkshire, Hits Radio East Yorkshire & North Lincolnshire, Hits Radio Lincolnshire and TMCR 95.3, a community-based radio station that broadcast from its studios in Thorne. The local newspaper is the Doncaster Free Press.
