= Westwoodside =

Village in North Lincolnshire, England

Coordinates: 53.488255°N 0.86839°W

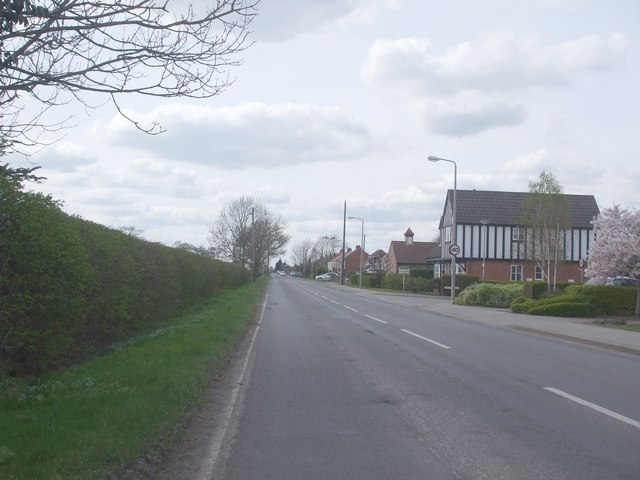
- Westwoodside village

- Location within Lincolnshire
- Population: 2,000 (2021)
- OS grid reference: SK751996
  - London: 140 mi (230 km) SSE
- Civil parish: Haxey
- Unitary authority: North Lincolnshire
- Ceremonial county: Lincolnshire
- Region: Yorkshire and the Humber
- Country: England
- Sovereign state: United Kingdom
- Post town: DONCASTER
- Postcode district: DN9
- Dialling code: 01427
- Police: Humberside
- Fire: Humberside
- Ambulance: East Midlands
- UK Parliament: Doncaster East and the Isle of Axholme

Westwoodside is a village in North Lincolnshire, England. It is situated on the Isle of Axholme 7 miles (11 km) north-west of Gainsborough, 11 miles (18 km) east of Doncaster and 10 miles (16 km) south-west of Scunthorpe. Westwoodside is in the civil parish of Haxey, a town 1 mile (1.6 km) to the east.

In earlier days, the Westwood side of the civil parish of Haxey was composed of the hamlets of Park (bef. 1882), Newbigg, Nethergate, Upperthorpe (or Overthorpe) and Commonside.

The village has a primary school.

The community is involved in an annual game over seven hundred years old called Haxey Hood.

Bradley Benjamin Thomas Anderson Musgreaves was born here in 1903. His family home has been turned into a local museum along with a conjoined post office.
