= Isle of Axholme =

Region on the border of North Lincolnshire and Yorkshire in England

Coordinates: 53.50°N 0.86°W

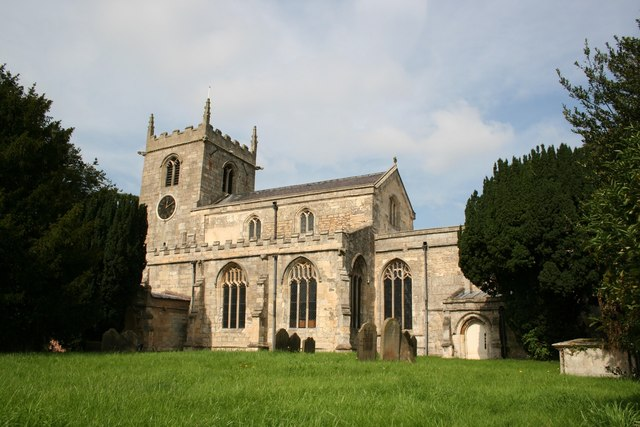
All Saints' Church in Belton, Isle of Axholme

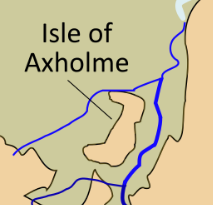
The Isle of Axholme, from a map of the Kingdom of Lindsey during the 7th century AD

The Isle of Axholme is an area of North Lincolnshire, England, adjoining South Yorkshire and the East Riding of Yorkshire. It is located between Scunthorpe and Gainsborough, both of which are in the traditional West Riding of Lindsey, and Doncaster, in South Yorkshire.

== Description ==
The name Isle is given to the area since, prior to the area being drained by the Dutchman Cornelius Vermuyden in the 17th century, each town or village was built on areas of dry, raised ground in the surrounding marshland. The River Don used to flow to the north and west (it has since been diverted), dividing the Isle from Yorkshire; the River Idle separates the Isle from Nottinghamshire; and the River Trent separates the Isle from the rest of Lincolnshire. Three towns developed here: Epworth, Crowle and Haxey.

The boundaries of the Isle of Axholme usually match with those of the ancient wapentake of Epworth and its 17 communities as listed in the Domesday Book of 1086: Belton, Crowle, Epworth, Haxey, Beltoft, (High and Low) Burnham, Owston Ferry, (East) Lound and (Graise)lound, Garthorpe, Luddington, Amcotts, (West) Butterwick, Althorpe, The Marshes, Waterton, Upperthorpe, and Westwoodside. Other settlements on the Isle include Eastoft, Sandtoft – home to Europe's largest trolleybus museum – and Wroot.

Much of the northern part of the Isle has flat topography, with rich farmland used mainly to grow wheat and sugar beet. The land is particularly fertile due to its history of annual flooding from the Trent and peat soil which was created by dense ancient woodland which covered much of the Isle. Even today, in many parts of the northern Isle, petrified wood can be found at about six feet below ground; relics from this woodland, these are locally called "bog oaks".

A long-distance walking route, the "Peatlands Way", traverses the Isle.

== Etymology ==
Axholme means "island by Haxey", from the town name + Old Norse holmr "island". The name was recorded as Hakirhomle in 1196. The Old English suffix "ey" in "Haxey" also indicates an island.

== Historical descriptions ==
=== 1833 description ===
Axholme, Isle of Area of slight elevation above flat and formerly marshy tract bounded by the Rivers Trent, Torne and Idle. Towns include Crowle, Belton, Epworth and Haxey on higher ground and Owston Ferry and West Butterwick beside the River Trent

— Bartholomew's Gazetteer of Britain compiled by Oliver Mason (John Bartholomew, 1833)

=== 1911 description ===
AXHOLME, an island in the north-west part of Lincolnshire, England, lying between the rivers Trent, Idle and Don, and isolated by drainage channels connected with these rivers. It consists mainly of a plateau of slight elevation, rarely exceeding 100 ft., and comprises the parishes of Althorpe, Belton, Epworth, Haxey, Luddington, Owston and Crowle; the total area being about 47,000 acres.

— "Axholme". Encyclopædia Britannica. Vol. 3 (11th ed.). 1911. p. 68.

== Land drainage history ==
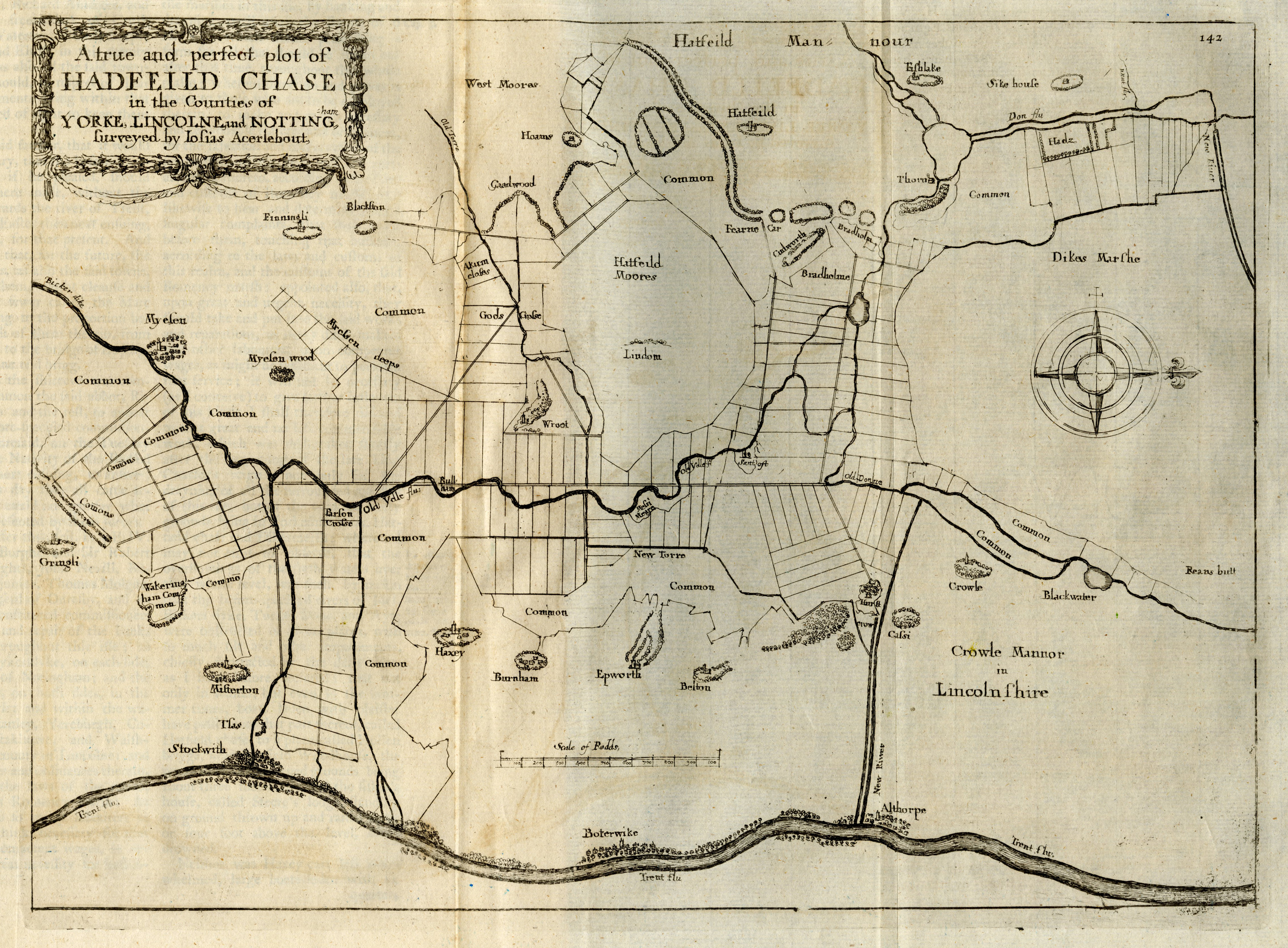
"A true and perfect Plot of Hatfield Chase, in the Counties of York, Lincoln, and Nottingham as surveyed by Josias Acerlebout." from "The history of imbanking and drayning" by William Dugdale (1662).

The Isle is known for the early influence of Cornelius Vermuyden, a Dutch engineer who initiated the realignment of several of the highland carriers flowing through the district. To carry out the work he brought in a large number of Flemish workers, many of whom settled permanently despite violent opposition from the established population. The drainage allowed increased agricultural production, and has left a legacy in the unique strip farming which survives in the 21st century around Epworth. The watercourses of the Isle and the surrounding area are managed by the Isle of Axholme Internal Drainage Board which maintains 188 miles (302 km) of watercourse and 18 pumping stations, and manages the water levels of the adjacent Thorne Moors and Hatfield Moors, both environmentally sensitive areas.

== Road and railway ==
The Axholme Joint Railway traversed the area, but the line has now been abandoned. There are still railway stations in Crowle and Althorpe on the line between Scunthorpe and Sheffield. The M180 motorway now crosses the centre of the area, dividing 'South Axholme', centred on Epworth, from 'North Axholme', centred on Crowle. The A161 road crosses the Isle from north to south.

== Governance ==
There was an Isle of Axholme Rural District from 1894 to 1974, which covered the entire Isle after 1936. This became part of the Boothferry district of Humberside in 1974, and since 1996 has been in the North Lincolnshire unitary authority.

Following boundary changes in 2023, the isle became part of the new Doncaster East and the Isle of Axholme parliamentary constituency in 2024.
