= North Lincolnshire =

Borough in Lincolnshire, England

Coordinates: 53.60°N 0.65°W

- Unitary authority and borough
- North Lincs
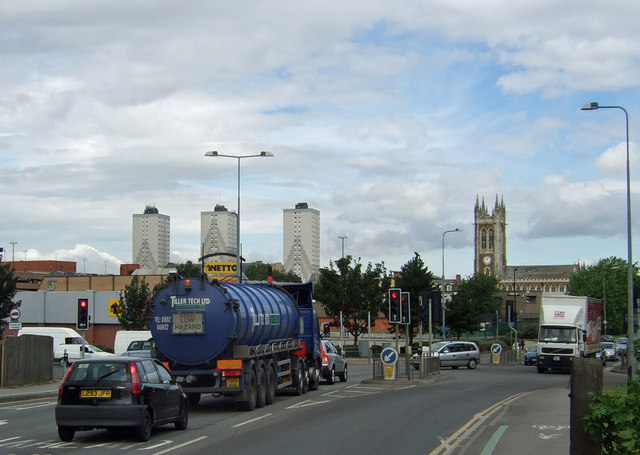
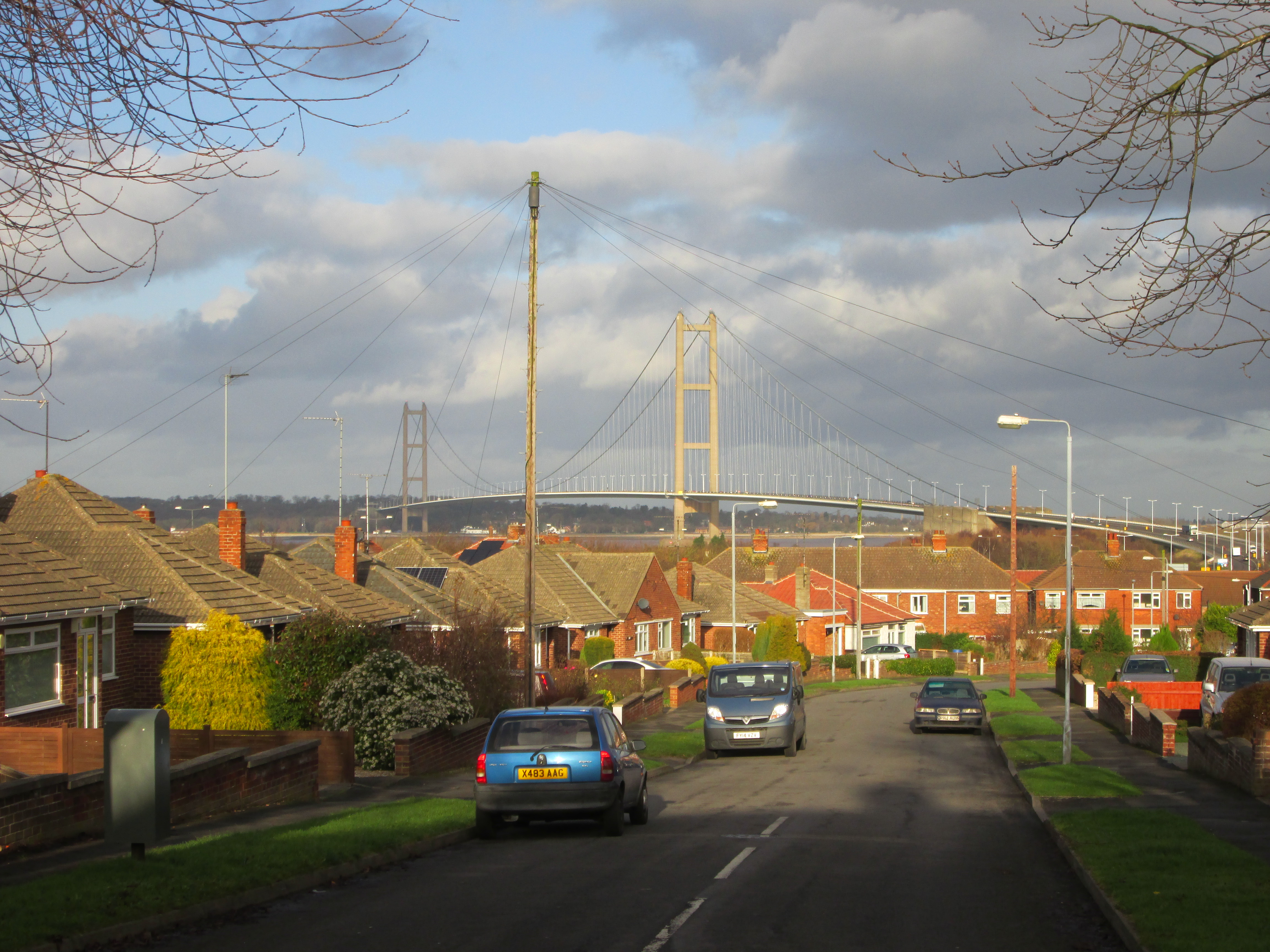
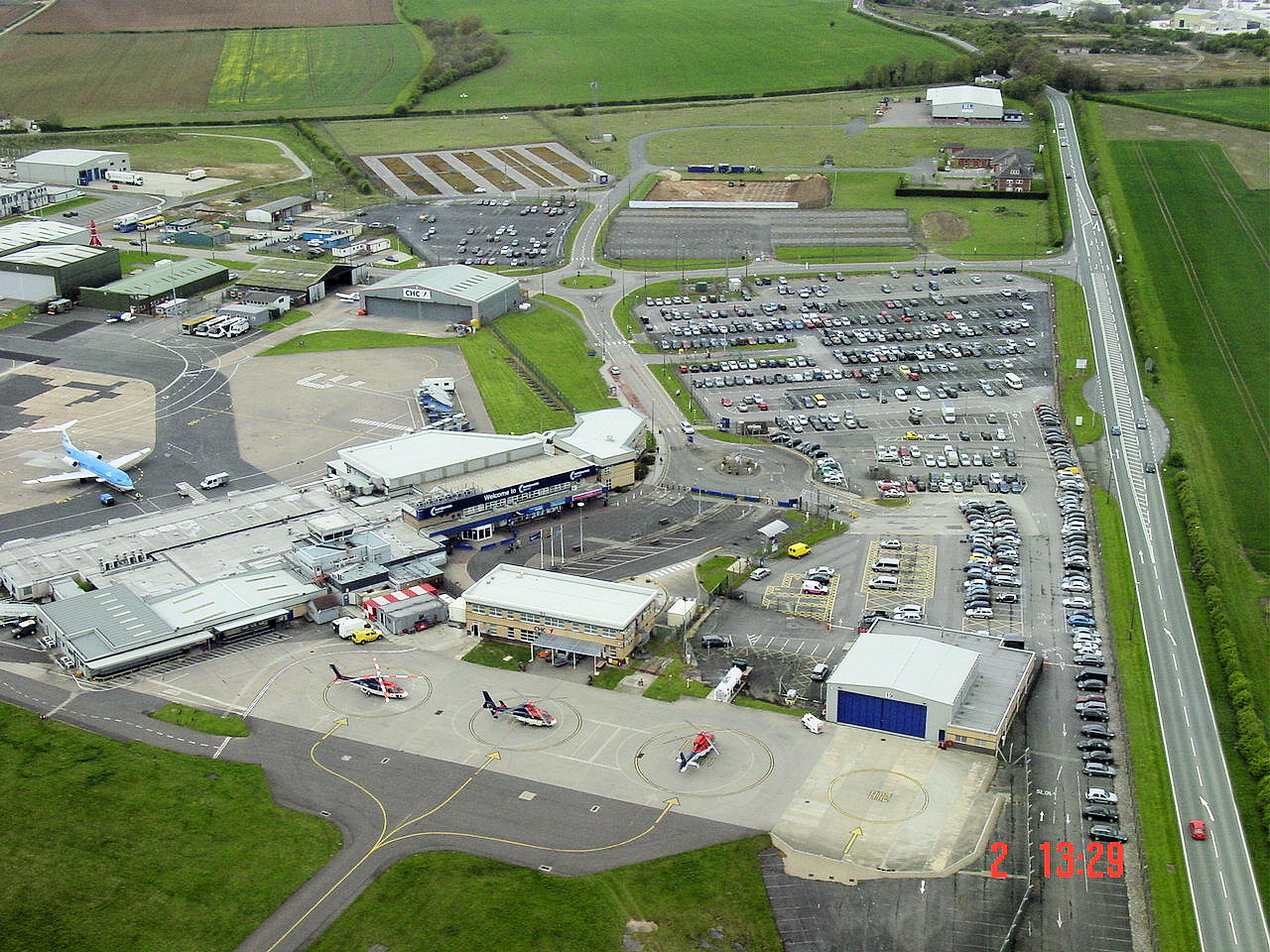
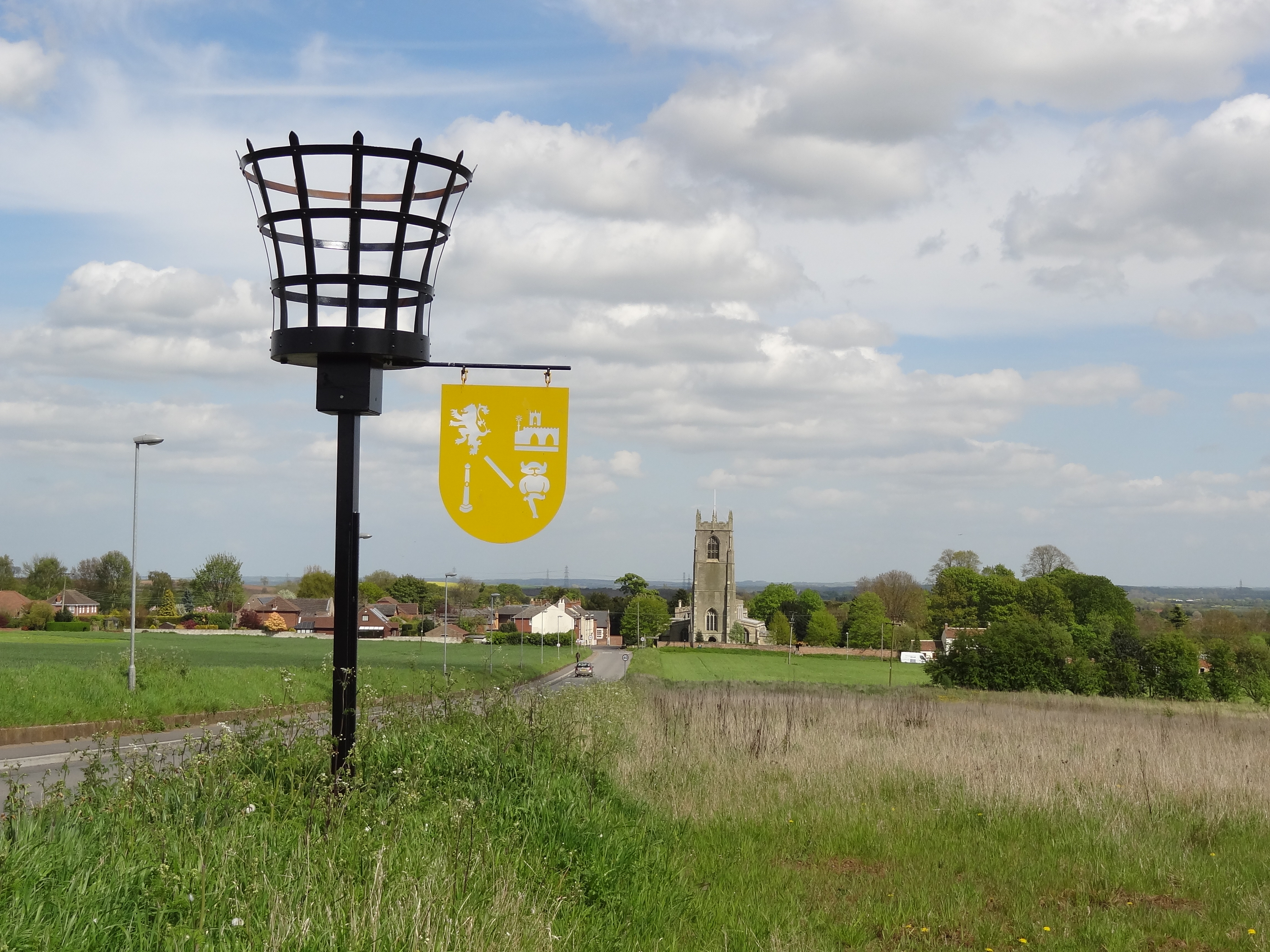
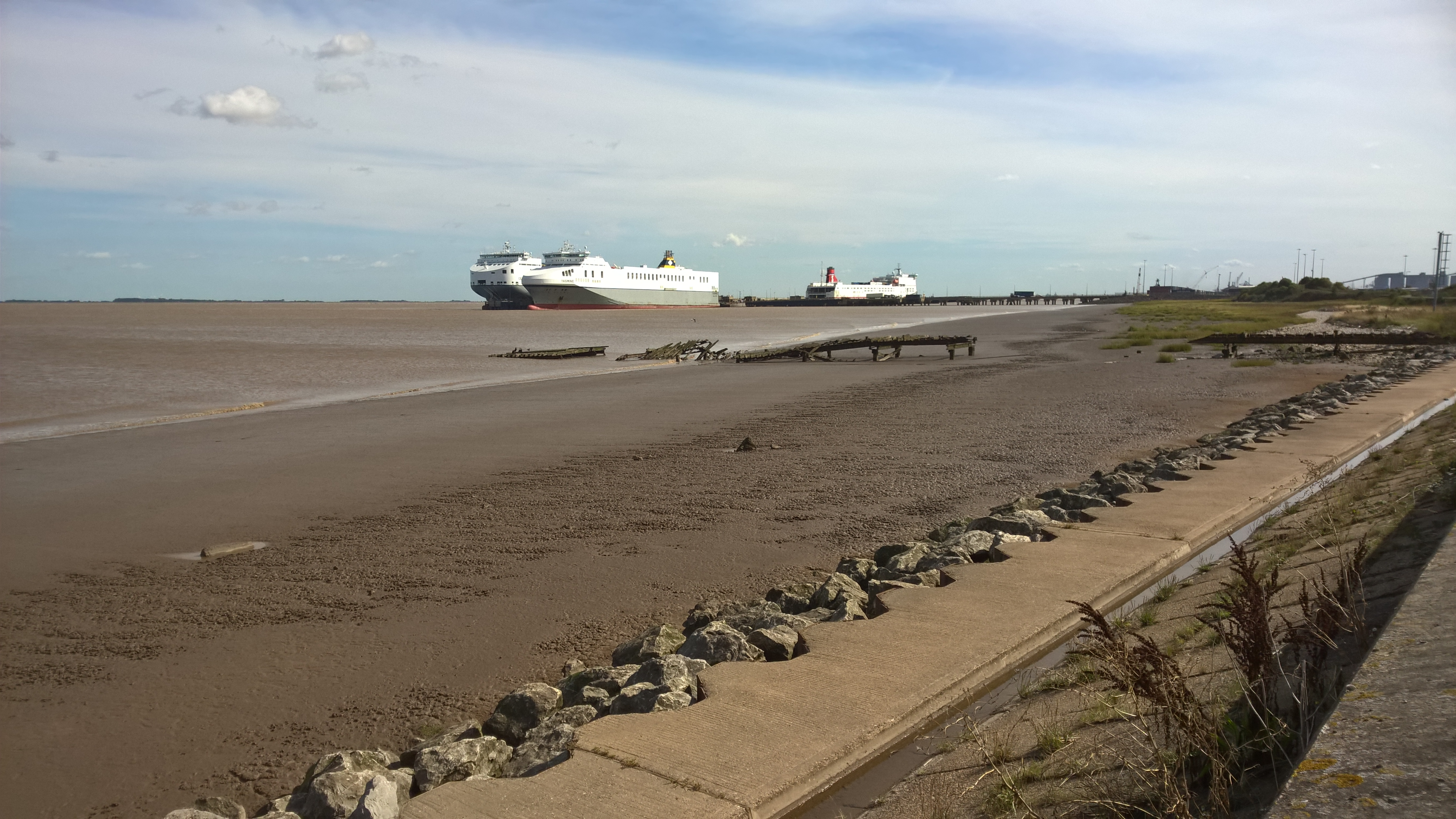
- From left to right; Top: Central Scunthorpe; Middle: Humber Bridge at Barrow-upon-Humber and Humberside Airport in Barnetby le Wold; Bottom: Westwoodside on the Isle of Axholme and the Humber Sea Terminal at South Killingholme

- Shown within Lincolnshire
- Sovereign state: United Kingdom
- Constituent country: England
- Region: Yorkshire and the Humber
- Ceremonial county: Lincolnshire
- Admin. HQ: Scunthorpe
- Towns and large villages of the borough (2021 census BUASD): List: Althorpe; Barnetby le Wold; Barrow upon Humber; Barton upon Humber (Town); Belton; Bottesford (Town); Brigg (Town); Burton upon Stather; Crowle (Town); Epworth (Town); Flixborough; Goxhill; Gunness; Haxey (Town); Hibaldstow; Keadby; Kirton in Lindsey (Town); Messingham; Owston Ferry; Scawby; Scunthorpe (Town); South Killingholme; Ulceby, North Lincolnshire; Westwoodside; Winteringham; Winterton (Town); Wrawby

Government
  - Body: North Lincolnshire Council
  - Leadership: Leader & Cabinet
  - Executive: Conservative
  - MPs: Nic Dakin (L); Martin Vickers (C)

Area
  - Total: 327 sq mi (847 km^{2})
  - Rank: 38th

Population (2024)
  - Total: 171,336
  - Rank: Ranked 123rd
  - Density: 524/sq mi (202/km^{2})

Ethnicity (2021)
  - Ethnic groups: List: 94.3% White; 3.3% Asian; 1.1% Mixed; 0.5% Black; 0.7% other

Religion (2021)
  - Religion: List: 55.2% Christianity; 40.9% no religion; 2.6% Islam; 0.3% Hinduism; 0.4% Sikhism; 0.3% Buddhism; 0.4% other
- Time zone: UTC+0 (Greenwich Mean Time)
  - Summer (DST): UTC+1 (British Summer Time)
- Postcode: DN
- ISO 3166-2: GB-NLN
- ONS code: 00FD (ONS); E06000013 (GSS)
- Website: northlincs.gov.uk

North Lincolnshire is a unitary authority area with borough status in Lincolnshire, England. At the 2011 Census, it had a population of 167,446. The administrative centre and largest settlement is Scunthorpe, and the borough also includes the towns of Brigg, Broughton, Haxey, Crowle, Epworth, Bottesford, Winterton, Kirton in Lindsey and Barton-upon-Humber. North Lincolnshire is part of the Yorkshire and the Humber region. The borough is mostly rural in character aside from near the town of Scunthorpe and near the Port of Immingham where most of the nearby villages and towns form part of the wider urban areas.

North Lincolnshire was formed following the abolition of Humberside County Council in 1996, when four unitary authorities replaced it, North Lincolnshire and North East Lincolnshire, on the south bank of the Humber Estuary, and the East Riding of Yorkshire and Kingston upon Hull on the north bank.

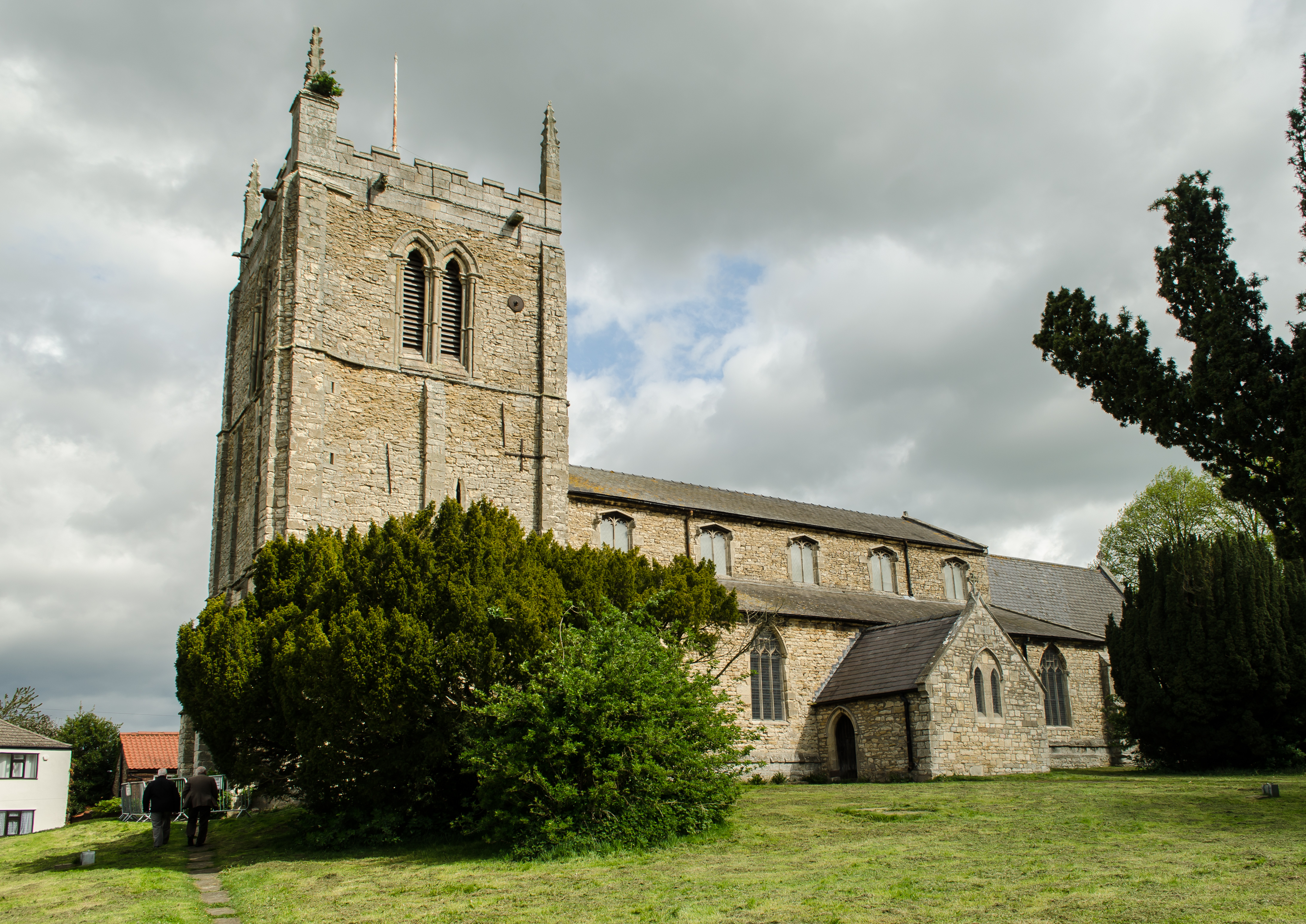
Kirton in Lindsey, one of the towns of North Lincolnshire

It is home to the Haxey Hood, a traditional event which takes place in Haxey on 6 January, a large football scrum where a leather tube (the "hood") is pushed to one of four pubs, where it remains until next year's game.

== Location ==
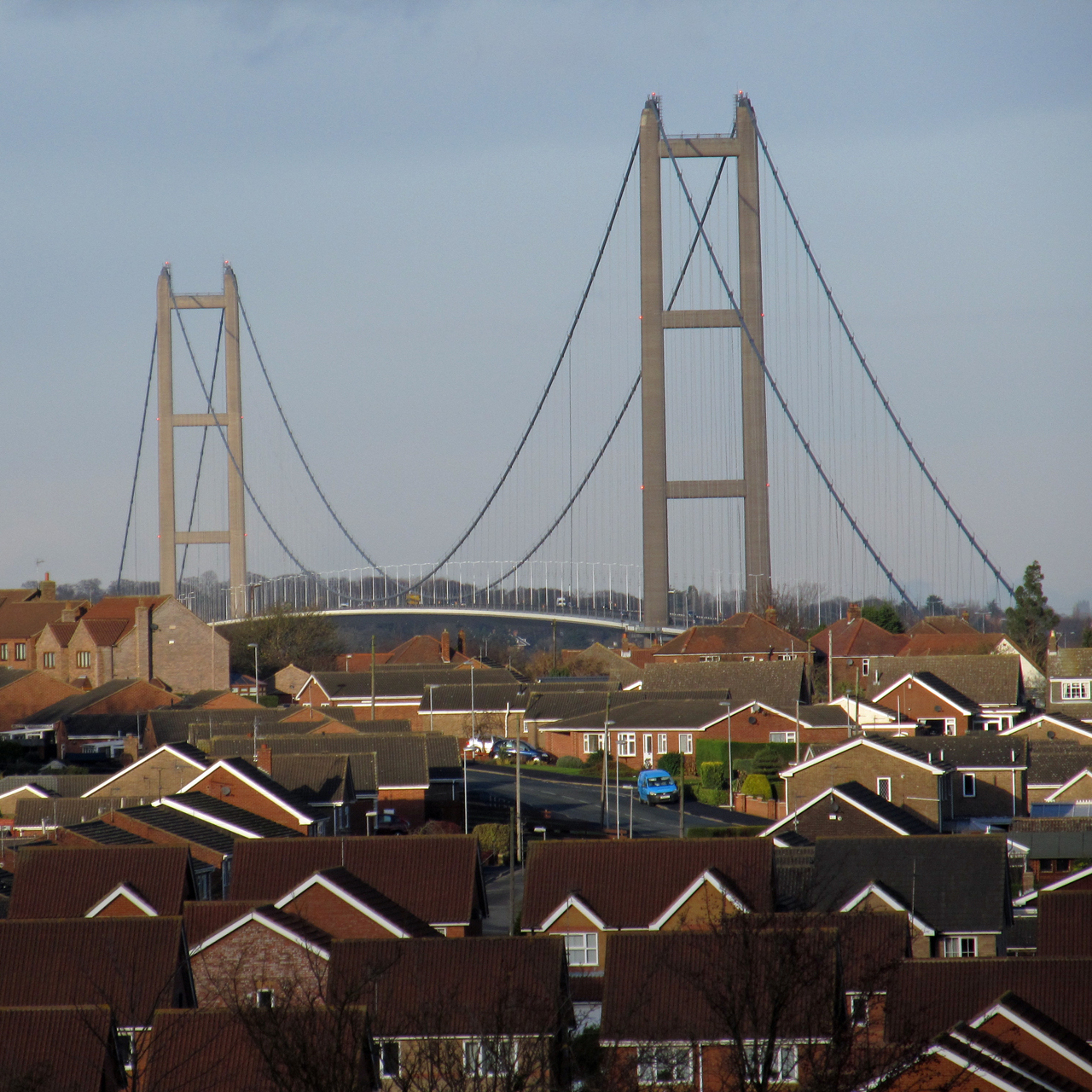
Barton upon Humber, one of the towns of North Lincolnshire and also near the Humber Bridge which connects the town and Lincolnshire to Hessle and Kingston upon Hull in the East Riding of Yorkshire.

The 846 km^{2} (327 sq mi) council area lies on the south side of the Humber Estuary and consists mainly of agricultural land, including land on either side of the River Trent. It borders onto North East Lincolnshire, Lincolnshire, South Yorkshire, Nottinghamshire and the East Riding of Yorkshire. The council is based in Scunthorpe.

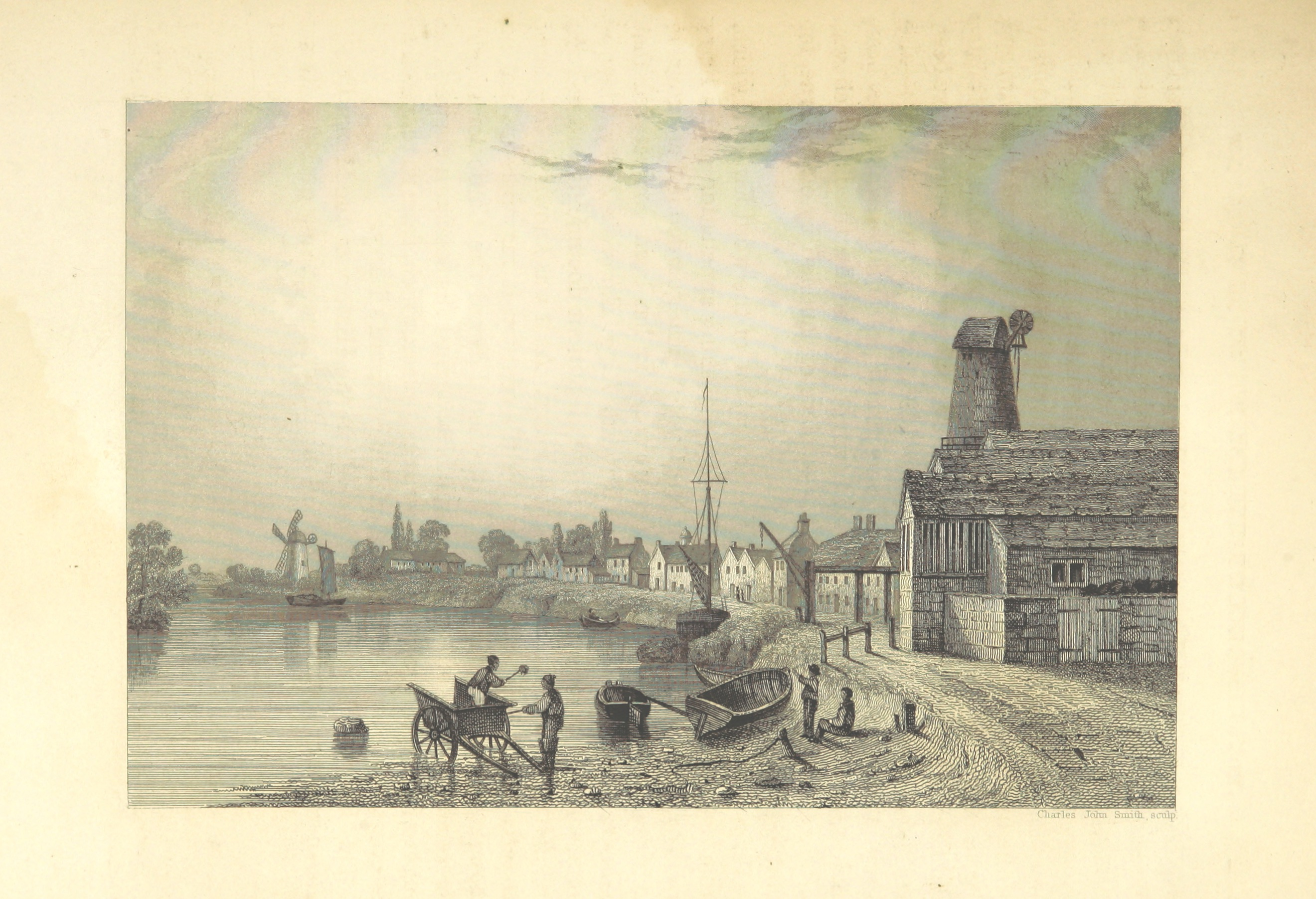
The Isle of Axholme which forms a majority of North Lincolnshire

== History of area ==
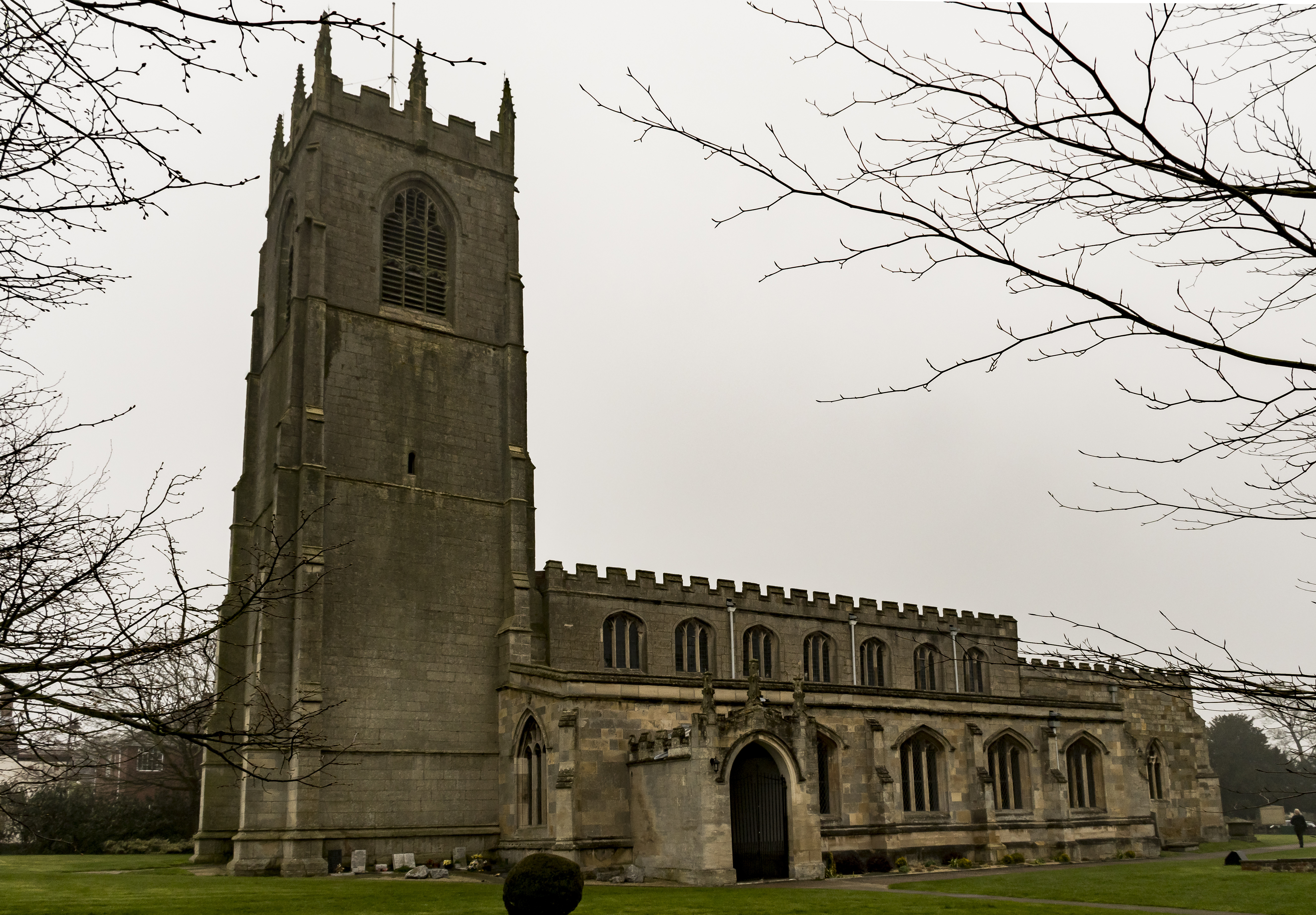
Haxey, known for the Haxey Hood and the historic capital of the Isle of Axholme in Lincolnshire

The former districts of Glanford, Scunthorpe, and the southern part of Boothferry, were non-metropolitan districts of the county of Humberside from 1974 to 1996. Humberside was abolished that year and those three districts merged to form the new unitary authority area of North Lincolnshire, as part of an expanded Lincolnshire ceremonial county. The area had previously been within the Lincolnshire administrative county before 1974 as a collection of municipal boroughs, urban districts, and rural districts. The new district of North Lincolnshire was awarded borough status on 16 December 1996, allowing the chair of the council to take the title of mayor.

== Towns and villages ==
- Alkborough, Althorpe, Amcotts, Appleby, Ashby
- Barrow Haven, Barrow upon Humber, Barnetby le Wold, Barton on Humber, Belton, Beltoft, Bonby, Bottesford, Brigg, Broughton, Burringham, Burton upon Stather
- Cadney, Coleby, Crowle, Croxton
- Dragonby
- Ealand, East Butterwick, East Halton, Eastoft, Elsham, Epworth, Epworth Turbary
- Flixborough, Fockerby, Ferriby Sluice
- Gainsthorpe, Garthorpe, Goxhill, Grasby, Gunness
- Haxey, Hibaldstow, Horkstow, Howsham
- Keadby, Keelby, Kingsforth, Kirmington, Kirton in Lindsey
- Luddington
- Manton, Melton Ross, Messingham, Mill Place
- New Holland, North Killingholme
- Owston Ferry
- Redbourne, Roxby
- Sandtoft, Santon, Saxby All Saints, Scawby with Sturton, Scunthorpe, South End, South Killingholme, South Ferriby
- Thornton Curtis
- Ulceby, Ulceby Skitter
- Walcot, Westwoodside, West Butterwick, West Halton, Whitton, Winteringham, Winterton, Wootton, Worlaby, Wrawby, Wressle
- Yaddlethorpe

== Politics ==
The local authority is North Lincolnshire Council, based in at Church Square House in the centre of Scunthorpe.

The area is represented in parliament by three MPs. At the 2010 election the Labour Party retained the Scunthorpe seat and the Conservative Party won the Brigg and Goole seat and the Cleethorpes seat which includes the Barton area.

== Economy ==
This is a chart of trend of regional gross value added of North and North East Lincolnshire at current basic prices published (pp. 240–253) by Office for National Statistics with figures in millions of British Pounds Sterling. 2004 onwards published (pp. 139) in 2007

Year	Regional Gross Value Added	Agriculture	Industry	Services
1995	3,512	82	1,701	1,729
2000	3,861	60	1,805	1,997
2003	4,569	62	1,896	2,611
2004	4,838	–	–	–
2005	4,941	–	–	–
2006	5,126	–	–	–
2007	5,494	–	–	–

Eastern Airways has its head office in the Schiphol House on the grounds of Humberside Airport in Kirmington, North Lincolnshire. Scunthorpe is the home of the British Steel owned Appleby-Frodingham steel plant, one of the largest and most successful plants in Europe. Port operations, green energy, logistics, agriculture and food processing are important elements of the areas employment profile.

== Media ==
In terms of television, the area is covered by BBC Yorkshire and Lincolnshire which broadcast from Hull and ITV Yorkshire broadcasts from Leeds. Television signals are received from the Belmont TV transmitter.

Radio stations for the area are BBC Radio Humberside, Hits Radio East Yorkshire & North Lincolnshire, Nation Radio East Yorkshire, and Greatest Hits Radio East Yorkshire & Northern Lincolnshire. Community based stations are Steel FM (for Scunthorpe) and TMCR 95.3 (covering Epworth and Isle of Axholme).

== Gallery ==
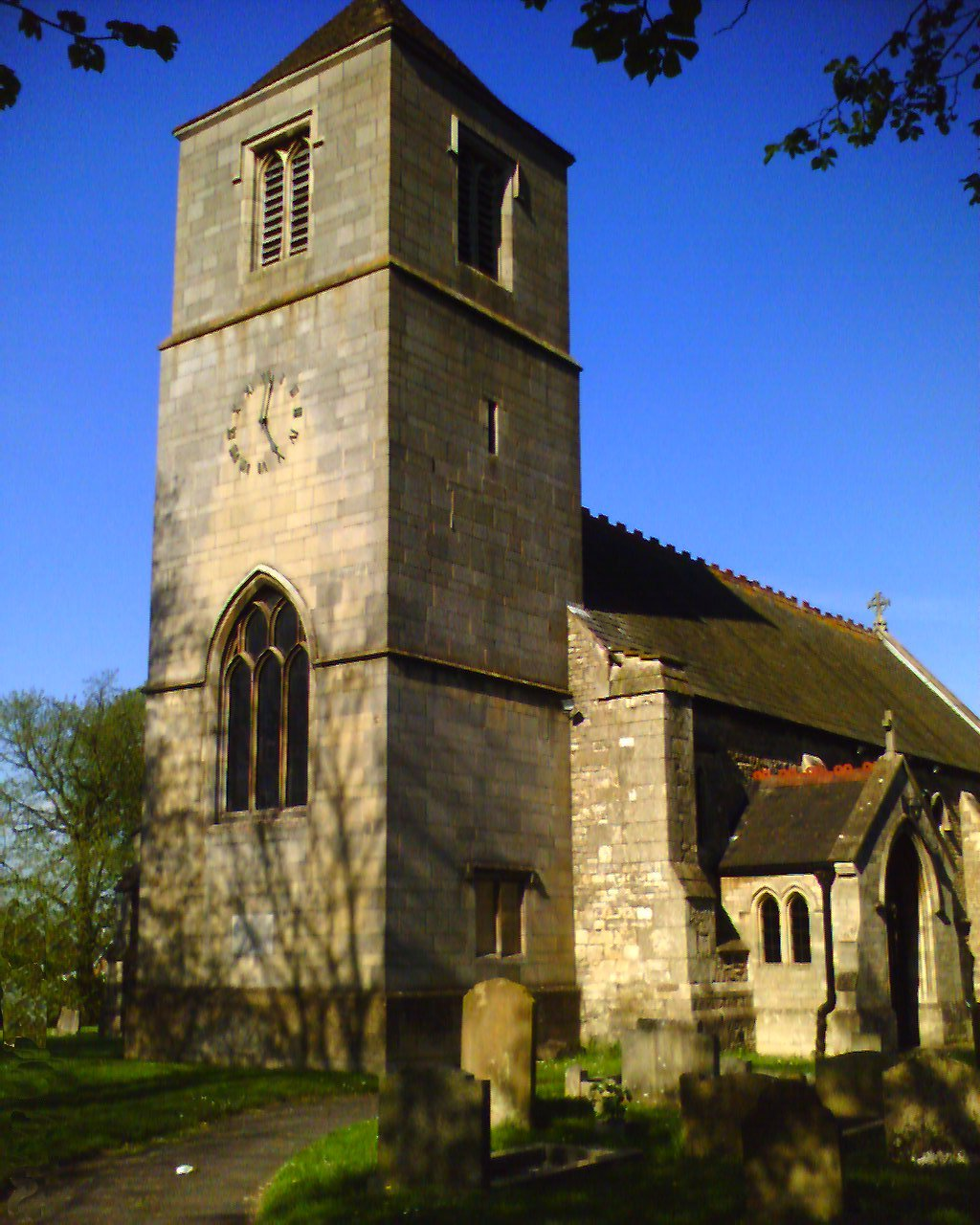
St. Hybald Church in Hibaldstow, Brigg

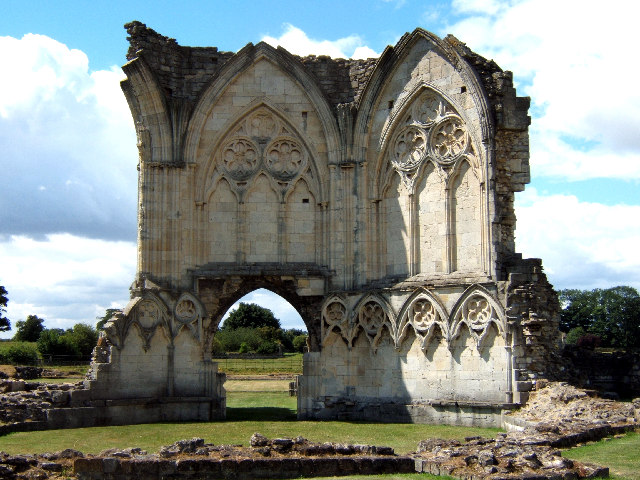
Thornton Abbey in Thornton Curtis

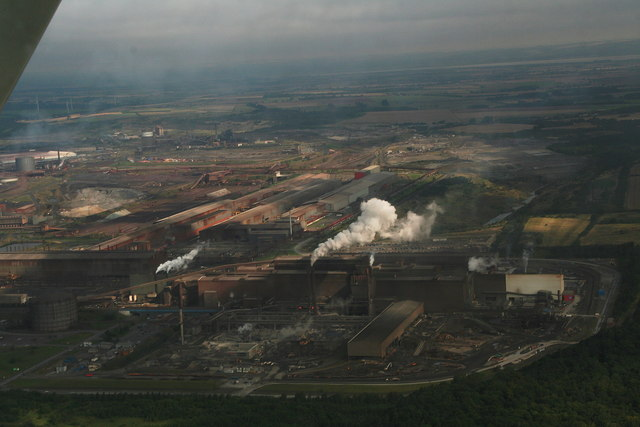
Scunthorpe Steelworks in Scunthorpe

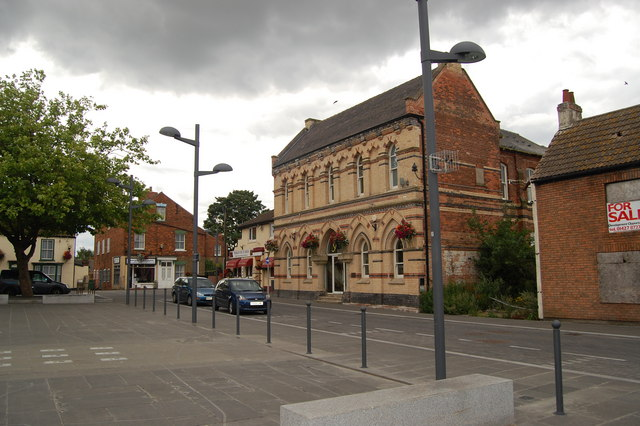
Crowle town centre
