= Owston Ferry =

Village in Lincolnshire, England

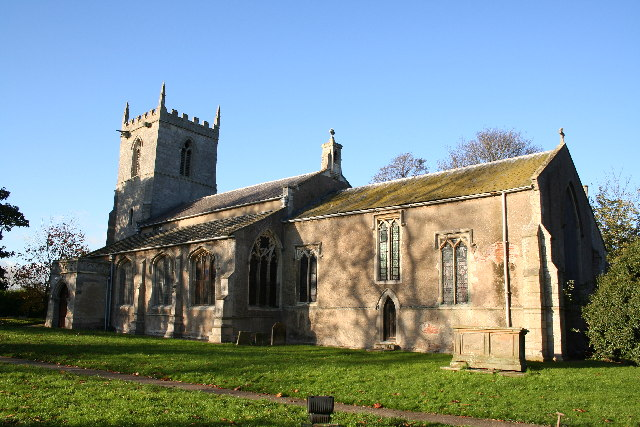
- Church of St Martin, at Owston Ferry

- Location within Lincolnshire
- Population: 1,328 (2011 census)
- OS grid reference: SE805005
  - London: 135 mi (217 km) SSE
- Unitary authority: North Lincolnshire
- Ceremonial county: Lincolnshire
- Region: Yorkshire and the Humber
- Country: England
- Sovereign state: United Kingdom
- Post town: DONCASTER
- Postcode district: DN9
- Dialling code: 01427
- Police: Humberside
- Fire: Humberside
- Ambulance: East Midlands

Owston Ferry is a village and civil parish in North Lincolnshire, England. It is situated on the west bank of the River Trent, and 9 miles (14 km) north from Gainsborough. It had a total resident population of 1,128 in 2001 including Kelfield. This increased to 1,328 at the 2011 census. Sometimes referred to as Owston or Ferry, the village forms part of the Isle of Axholme. It is bounded to the west by the A161 road and the town of Haxey. The River Trent is directly to the east. To the north, beyond a number of hamlets and villages, lies the Humber estuary. West Butterwick was originally a part of the township of Owston.

== History ==
The name "Owston" is thought to derive from the Old Norse "austr+tun", meaning "east farmstead", a view shared by other sources which outline that it specifically implied the "farmstead east of Haxey". The name "Owston" is shared by at least two other settlements within the United Kingdom. In the 1086 Domesday Book it is listed as "Ostone",

Owston Ferry Castle, also known as Kinnard's Ferry Castle, was a motte-and-bailey fortification from the 12th century. It lay on the site of an earlier, Roman castrum. It was dismantled by order of Henry II of England in 1175–1176 following the Revolt of 1173–1174.

Owston Ferry Grade I listed Anglican parish church is dedicated to St Martin. The church register dates from 1603.

In 1885 Kelly's reported the existence of Wesleyan and Primitive Methodist chapels, a rope-walk, boatbuilding yard, several corn mills, and the manufacture of sacking and sail cloth. The parish was of 5,350 acres (2,165 ha). Wheat, barley, potatoes, beans and grass were grown.

== Governance ==
As part of the provisions of the Local Government Act 1972, Owston Ferry formed part of the Boothferry district of the county of Humberside, having previously been within the Parts of Lindsey from the historic county boundaries of Lincolnshire. Since 1996 however, Owston Ferry has formed part of the unitary authority area of North Lincolnshire and the county of Lincolnshire.

== Assessment as nuclear site ==
In 2009, a specific area of land in Owston Ferry was highlighted in a study by W. S. Atkins for the Department of Energy on alternative sites for a nuclear power plant as a potentially suitable site "worthy of further consideration". (It had featured in a 1970s CEGB list of possible sites for such plant.) By 2010, the department had issued another document saying it had given the matter further consideration; it had concluded that, although the site nominally met its "strategic site assessment criteria" for new nuclear power sites, it was not a credible site for deployment of new nuclear by the end of 2025 – adding that anyway, no firm had expressed any interest in building such plant there.

== Geography ==
Owston Ferry stands on flat ground by the River Trent at 53°29′42.8″N 0°47′8.3″W (53.495228°, -0.785656°). The civil parish of Owston Ferry includes the village of Owston Ferry and some smaller places, including West Ferry, Gunthorpe, Heckdyke and Melwood. The landscape is characterised by flat farmland with drainage ditches and flood meadows. There is a pumping station, operated by the Environment Agency, where the Ferry Drain and Warping Drain join the river Trent.

== Education ==
Owston Ferry contains one primary school, St Martin's Church of England Primary School.

== Notable people ==
- Philippa Foot, philosopher and inventor of the branch of ethics known as "trolleyology", which means thinking about the trolley problem, was born in Owston Ferry on 3 October 1920, and died on 3 October 2010 in Oxford, aged 90.
- Epworth-born Alexander Kilham, founder of the Methodist New Connexion, worked in Owston Ferry during his teens.

== See also ==
- East Ferry
- Trent Aegir
