= Hunt (surname) =

Family name

Hunt is an occupational surname related with hunting, originating in England and Ireland. In Estonia, the surname Hunt is also very common, meaning wolf in the Estonian language.

The Irish family surname is derived from Ó Fiachna and the significance is fiach means "the chase"; the clan itself was part of the Connachta's Síol Muireadaigh (kindred to the Ó Conchubhair and Mac Diarmada), located in County Roscommon and County Sligo.

== People ==
- Aaron Hunt (born 1986), German footballer
- Abijah Hunt (1762–1811), American merchant, planter and banker
- Adam Hunt (born 1993), British darts player
- Akeem Hunt (born 1993), American football player
- Albert Hunt (disambiguation), multiple people
- Alexandra Hunt, American public health researcher and activist
- Alfred Hunt (1817–1888), American industrialist
- Alfred E. Hunt (1855–1899), American metallurgist and industrialist
- Arthur Surridge Hunt (1871–1934), English papyrologist
- Aubrey Thomas de Vere (1814–1902), Irish poet and critic (de Vere Hunt)
- Augusta Merrill Hunt (1842–1932), American philanthropist, suffragist, temperance leader
- Ben Hunt (baseball) (1888–1927), American baseball player
- Ben Hunt (rugby league) (born 1990), Australian rugby league player
- Bert Hunt (1911–1985), English cricketer
- Bert Hunt (ice hockey) (1891–1928), Canadian professional ice hockey player
- Bonnie Hunt (born 1961), American actress and writer
- Brad Hunt (disambiguation), multiple people
- Cameron Hunt (born 1994), American football player
- Caroline Rose Hunt (1923–2018), American heiress and philanthropist
- Carolyn Hunt (born 1937), American educator, politician, and First Lady of North Carolina
- Charles Cooke Hunt (1833–1868), Australian explorer
- Charlton Hunt (1801–1836), American lawyer and politician
- Chris Hunt, British journalist and author
- Chris Hunt (badminton) (born 1968), English badminton player
- Christopher Hunt (1584–1607), English bookseller and stationer
- Clare Hunt (born 1999), Australian footballer
- Clark Hunt (born 1965), American businessman and sports executive
- Cletidus Hunt (born 1976), American football player
- Cole Hunt (born 1995), American football player
- Dario Hunt (born 1989), American basketball player
- David Hunt (disambiguation), multiple people
- Douglas I. Hunt (1937–2024), American college football coach, and politician in Utah
- Dryden Hunt (born 1995), Canadian ice hockey player
- Duane Garrison Hunt (1884–1960), American; Roman Catholic Bishop of Salt Lake City
- E. Howard Hunt (1918–2007), American intelligence officer and writer
- Earl B. Hunt (1933–2016), American psychologist
- Earl Gladstone Hunt Jr. (1918–2005), American Methodist pastor
- Elisha Hunt (1779–1873), American entrepreneur behind the historic steamboat Enterprise
- Ella Hunt (born 1998), English actress
- Ernie Hunt (1943–2018), English footballer
- Esther Hunt (1751–1820), American Quaker pioneer
- Fern Hunt (born 1948), American mathematician
- Flint Gregory Hunt (1959–1997), American murderer
- Florence Hunt (born 2007), English actress
- Frances Hunt, American politician
- Frank W. Hunt (1871–1906), American politician
- Fred Hunt (disambiguation), multiple people
- Frederick Vinton Hunt ("Ted", 1905–1972), American acoustic engineer
- Gareth Hunt (1942–2007), British actor
- Gary Hunt (born 1984), sports diver, specialising in cliff or high diving.
- George Hunt (disambiguation), multiple people
- Georgina Hunt (1922–2012), English abstract artist
- Gertrude Breslau Hunt (1869–1952), American author and lecturer
- Greg Hunt (born 1965), Australian politician
- Harriet Hunt (born 1978), British chess player
- Henry George Bonavia Hunt (1847–1917), English music educator
- H. Guy Hunt (1933–2009), American politician
- H. L. Hunt (1889–1974), American oil tycoon and political activist
- Helen Hunt (born 1963), American actress
- Henry Hunt (disambiguation), multiple people
- Herbert Hunt (disambiguation), multiple people
- Hubert Hunt (1898–1981), British World War I flying ace
- Ida Brooks Hunt (1878–1929), American singer and actress
- Irene Hunt (1903–2001), American children's writer
- Irene Hunt (actress) (1892–1988), American film actress of the silent era
- Irving O. Hunt (1878–1951), American football player and coach
- J. McVicker Hunt (1906–1991), American educational psychologist
- Jack Hunt (RAF officer) (1899–1954), British aviator
- Jack Hunt (American football) (born 1981), American football player
- Jack Hunt (footballer) (born 1990), English footballer
- Jackie Hunt (1920–1991), American football player
- Jalyx Hunt, American football player
- James Hunt (disambiguation), multiple people
- James Hunt (1947–1993), British racing driver
- Jamie Hunt (disambiguation), multiple people
- Jana Hunt (born 1997), American politician
- Jane Hunt (American politician)
- Jane Hunt (British politician)
- Jeremy Hunt (born 1966), British politician
- Jeremy Hunt (cyclist) (born 1974), British cyclist
- Jerry Hunt (1943–1993), American composer
- Jim Hunt (1937–2025), American politician
- Jimmy Hunt (1939–2025), American child actor
- Jimmy Hunt (musician) (born c. 1977), Canadian singer-songwriter
- John Hunt (disambiguation), multiple people
- Johnny Hunt (born 1952), American pastor and author
- Jon Hunt, British entrepreneur
- Jonathan Hunt (disambiguation), multiple people
- Julian Hunt, Baron Hunt of Chesterton (1941–2026), British meteorologist and life peer
- Justin Hunt (filmmaker) (born 1976), American filmmaker
- Justin Hunt (rugby league), (born 1988) Australian rugby league player
- Kareem Hunt (born 1995), American football player
- Karmichael Hunt (born 1986), Australian football player
- Kathryn Hunt, British actress
- Kelley Hunt, American blues pianist, singer, and songwriter
- Ken Hunt (disambiguation), including those named Kenneth
- Kimberly Hunt, American television journalist
- Lamar Hunt (1932–2006), American sports promoter
- Leigh Hunt (1784–1859), English author and critic
- Lester C. Hunt (1892–1954), American politician
- Linda Hunt, (born 1945), American actress
- Lynda Mullaly Hunt, American author
- Margus Hunt, (born 1987), Estonian discus thrower and American football player
- Mark Hunt, (born 1974), New Zealand mixed martial artist and kickboxer
- Mark Hunt (footballer) (born 1969), English footballer
- Marsha Hunt (actress, born 1917) (1917–2022), American actress
- Marsha Hunt (actress, born 1946), American actress, singer and novelist
- Martin Hunt, Nauruan minister and MP
- Marvin Hunt (born 1951), Canadian politician
- Marvin W. Hunt, American Renaissance historian
- Mary Hunt Affleck (1847–1932), American poet
- Megan Hunt (born 1995), Australian rules footballer
- Megan Hunt (politician) (born 1986), Nebraska State Senator
- Michael John Hunt (born 1941), English painter
- Mike Hunt (born 1956), American football linebacker
- Mike Hunt (1907–1996), American baseball player
- Neil Hunt, Australian rugby league player
- Nelson Bunker Hunt (1926–2014), American businessman
- Noel Hunt (born 1982), Irish footballer
- Patricia Hunt, New Zealand chemist
- Paul Hunt (disambiguation), multiple people
- Peter Hunt (disambiguation), multiple people
- Ralph Hunt (disambiguation), multiple people
- Ray C. Hunt (1919–?), American military officer
- Rex Hunt (born 1949), Australian television and radio journalist
- Rex Hunt (governor) (1926–2012), British diplomat
- Richard Hunt (disambiguation), multiple people
- Rimo Hunt (born 1985), Estonian footballer
- Rocco Hunt (born 1994), Italian singer-songwriter and rapper
- Robert Hunt (disambiguation), multiple people
- Roger Hunt (disambiguation), multiple people
- Ron Hunt (born 1941), American baseball player
- Ron Hunt (born 1933), English footballer
- Ron Hunt (born 1945), English footballer
- Sally Ward Lawrence Hunt Armstrong Downs (1827–1896), American socialite also known as Sallie Ward
- Samuel Hunt (disambiguation), multiple people
- Stephen de Vere (1812–1904), MP, poet and philanthropist (de Vere Hunt)
- Stephen Hunt (disambiguation), multiple people
- Stuart Hunt (1927–2014), American politician
- Susanna Hunt, English pop singer, actress and model
- Swanee Hunt (born 1950), American diplomat
- Thomas Hunt (disambiguation), multiple people
- Tim Hunt (died 2014), American professional wrestler
- Tim Hunt (born 1943), British biochemist
- Tristram Hunt (born 1974), British historian and politician, Labour MP for Stoke
- Una Hunt (1876–19??), American author
- Walter Hunt (disambiguation), multiple people
- Washington Hunt (1811–1867), Governor of New York
- Wesley Hunt (born 1981), American politician
- William Hunt (disambiguation), multiple people

== Fictional characters ==
- Blanche Hunt, in the British soap opera Coronation Street
- Dylan Hunt (Andromeda), protagonist of the television series Andromeda
- Deirdre Hunt (later Langton, Barlow and Rachid) in Coronation Street, daughter of Blanche
- Ethan Hunt, main character in Mission: Impossible films
- Gene Hunt, main character in the TV series Life on Mars and Ashes to Ashes
- Owen Hunt, major character in the TV series Grey's Anatomy

== See also ==
- Attorney General Hunt (disambiguation)
- General Hunt (disambiguation)
- Justice Hunt (disambiguation)
- Lord Hunt (disambiguation)
