= John Hunt =

John Hunt may refer to:

== Politics ==
- John Hunt (MP for Reading) (fl. 1383–1421), MP for Reading
- John Hunt (MP for Barnstaple), in 1407, MP for Barnstaple
- John Hunt (MP for Sudbury), in 1571, MP for Sudbury
- John Hunt (died 1586), in 1554, MP for Rutland
- John Hunt (New South Wales politician) (1856–1930), Australian politician
- John T. Hunt (1860–1916), U.S. Representative from Missouri
- John E. Hunt (1908–1989), New Jersey politician who was a member of the United States House of Representatives from 1967 to 1975
- John Hunt (Western Australian politician) (1912–1988), Australian politician
- John Hunt, Baron Hunt of Tanworth (1919–2008), British politician and Secretary of the Cabinet
- John Hunt (British politician, born 1929) (1929–2017), British Conservative Party politician, MP for Bromley, and for Ravensbourne
- John B. Hunt (born 1956), American politician, member of the New Hampshire House of Representatives

== Religion ==
- John Hunt (Quaker exile) (1712–1778), exiled with other Quakers without justification to Virginia during the Revolutionary War
- John Hunt (Quaker minister) (1740–1824), Quaker minister and journalist from Moorestown, New Jersey
- John Hunt (missionary) (1812–1848), English Methodist missionary
- John Hunt (theologian) (1827–1907), Scottish cleric, theologian and historian
- Johnny Hunt (born 1952), American evangelical Christian pastor and author

== Military ==
- John Hunt (Alabama) (1750–1822), Revolutionary War veteran for whom the city of Huntsville, Alabama is named
- John Hunt Morgan (1825–1864), general of a Confederate cavalry troop in the American Civil War
- Joshua French (alias John Hunt, born 1982), former Norwegian soldier

== Sports ==
- John Hunt (cricketer) (1874–1916), English cricketer
- John Hunt (curler), Welsh curler
- John Hunt (American football) (born 1962), American football guard
- John Hunt (rower) (1934–2005), Australian Olympic rower
- John Hunt (sports commentator), English broadcaster
- Johnny Hunt (footballer), English footballer
- Johnny Hunt (rugby league), Australian rugby league player

== Others ==
- John Hunt (died c. 1615) (c. 1550–1615), English gentleman of Rutland
- John Hunt (sculptor) (c.1690–1754), English sculptor
- John Hunt (Michigan judge) (died 1827), American jurist
- John Hunt (publisher) (1775–1848), English printer and publisher
- John Horbury Hunt (1838–1904), Canadian-born Australian architect
- John Hunt (antiquarian) (1900–1976), Irish antiquarian and collector
- John Hunt, Baron Hunt (1910–1998), leader of the 1953 British expedition to climb Mount Everest
- John Hunt (oceanographer) (1918–2005), marine scientist at the Woods Hole Oceanographic Institution
- John Hunt (psychiatric patient) (born 1981), Irish citizen who was involuntarily detained
- John David Hunt (1936– 2012), British metallurgist
- John Dixon Hunt (born 1936), European-born landscape historian
- John Wesley Hunt (1773–1849), businessman and early civic leader in Lexington, Kentucky
- John Hunt, Baron Hunt of Fawley (1905–1987), British general practitioner
- John Hunt, a fictional character in Willard Price's Adventure series
- Jackie Hunt (1920–1991), American football player with Chicago Bears
- John Clinton Hunt (1925–2017), American author

== See also ==
- John le Hunt (died after 1351), English-born judge in Ireland
- Jon Hunt (born 1953), British estate agent
- John Hunt Publishing, established in 2001 and renamed Collective Ink in 2013
- Jonathan Hunt (disambiguation)
- Jack Hunt (disambiguation)
