= James Hunt (disambiguation) =

James Hunt (1947–1993) was a British racing driver.

James or Jim Hunt may also refer to:

- Jim Hunt (1937–2025), American politician, governor of North Carolina
- James Hunt (sailor) (born 1936), American sailor, Olympic champion in 1960
- James Hunt (judge) (1943–2006), judge of the High Court of England and Wales
- James Hunt (footballer) (born 1976), English footballer
- James B. Hunt (1799–1857), Michigan politician
- Jim Hunt (columnist) (1926–2006), sportswriter from Toronto
- Jim Lee Hunt (1938–1975), American football defensive tackle
- Jimmy Hunt (1939–2025), American actor
- Leigh Hunt (James Henry Leigh Hunt, 1784–1859), English critic, essayist, poet and writer
- James Ramsay Hunt (1872–1937), American neurologist
- James I. Hunt, in 108th Ohio General Assembly
- James Hunt (speech therapist) (1833–1869), speech therapist and founder of the Anthropological Society of London, England
- James Hunt (Canadian politician) (1835–1915), Canadian politician
- James W. Hunt (1952–2021), American computer scientist and inventor
- James Husey-Hunt (1853–1924), English cricketer
- Jim Hunt (trainer) (1903–1999), American athletic trainer
- Jim Hunt (ice hockey), American ice hockey coach
- Jim Hunt (coach) (died 2019), cross-country and track and field coach
- James Hunt (rugby union) (1858–1924), English rugby union player

== See also ==
- Jamie Hunt (disambiguation)
