= Kelfield =

Kelfield may refer to:

- Kelfield, Lincolnshire, England
- Kelfield, North Yorkshire, England
- Kelfield, Saskatchewan, Canada
