= Justin Hunt =

Justin Hunt may refer to:

- Justin Hunt (adult entertainer), American pornographic actor
- Justin Hunt (filmmaker), American documentary filmmaker
- Justin Hunt (rugby league), Australian footballer
