= Elizabeth Kent =

Elizabeth Kent may refer to:

- Isis Pogson (1852–1945), British astronomer, also known as Elizabeth Isis Kent
- Elizabeth Kent (writer), 19th-century British writer on botany and horticulture
- Elizabeth Thacher Kent (1868–1952), environmentalist and women's rights activist
