= Cornelius Vermuyden =

Dutch engineer (1595-1677)

- Born: 1595; Haestinge, Dutch Republic
- Died: 11 October 1677 (aged 81–82); London, England
- Citizenship: Dutch Republic; Kingdom of England (1633–1677)

Sir Cornelius Vermuyden (Dutch pronunciation: [kɔrˈneːlijəs fərˈmœydə(n)], fer-MY-dun; also spelled Vermuijden; 1595 – 11 October 1677) was a Dutch engineer who introduced Dutch land reclamation methods to England.

Vermuyden was commissioned by the Crown to drain Hatfield Chase in the Isle of Axholme, Lincolnshire.

In the 1650s, he directed major projects to drain The Fens of East Anglia, introducing the innovation of constructing washes, to allow periodic flooding of the area by excess waters.

== Early life and education ==
Cornelius was the son of Gillis Vermuyden and Sarah Werkendet. He was born in 1595 in Haestinge on the Isle of Tholen in the Zeeland province of the Dutch Republic. He trained in the Netherlands as an engineer, learning Dutch techniques for controlling water and draining marshland. His father-in-law, Cornelius Werkendet, was a land drainage engineer, and Vermuyden worked in Beveland and Flanders before moving to England in 1621.

== Career in England ==
By the period of 1621 to 1623, Vermuyden was working in England, where his first projects were on the River Thames, repairing a sea wall at Dagenham and working to reclaim Canvey Island, Essex. The latter project was financed by Joas Croppenburg, a Dutch haberdasher to whom Vermuyden was related by marriage.

This, or perhaps work at Windsor, brought him to the notice of Charles I, who commissioned him in 1626 to drain Hatfield Chase in the Isle of Axholme, Lincolnshire. The King was Lord of the four principal manors there: Hatfield, Epworth, Crowle and Misterton, as well as 13 of the adjacent manors, and he wanted to expand the cultivable area. Vermuyden was to receive one third of the drained land, most of which had previously been commons, as recompense for his investment. To finance the drainage project, he sold shares in this land to other investors, including some fellow Dutchmen. Some French and Walloon Protestant refugees also settled in the area as landowners or tenants. The King intended to enclose one third of the common fen in his right of "improvement" as the Lord of the Manor, leaving one-third for those local residents who had common rights of pasturage in the fens.

The local people were upset by the project, particularly those of the Manor of Epworth, whose lord had already enclosed part of the commons in the 14th century. He had later signed a legal document giving up all subsequent rights of enclosure within the manor. As with other fen drainage schemes at the time, the locals did not oppose drainage per se, but were outraged about the large enclosures of their common pasture and turbary fens. This threatened their commons rights and livelihoods, as they depended on the fens for pasturage and for peat for burning as fuel. From 1627, the richer members of the community challenged the project in court by lawsuits, even as large groups of commoners (not necessarily poor people, but including some substantial farmers) rioted against the works and the enclosures. Because the legal position of the commoners of Epworth was unique, the legal debate over the drainage and enclosures lasted into the eighteenth century.

Vermuyden was knighted in 1629 for his work, and became an English citizen in 1633.

In 1631 he built the Horseshoe Sluice on the tidal river at Wisbech, Isle of Ely, Cambridgeshire at a cost of £8,000, by a "little Army of Artificers Venting, contriving and acting outlandish devises"

The work on Hatfield Chase was only partially successful: the straightening of the river Don and outlet into the Aire caused flooding in Fishlake, Sykehouse and Snaith. As a result of a lawsuit in 1633, Vermuyden dug the Dutch River, which provided a direct route from the Don to the River Ouse at Goole. It required him to deplete most of the land that he had acquired in the Chase. The same year he bought 4,000 acres (1,619 ha) of land in Sedgemoor on the Somerset Levels and Malvern Chase in Worcestershire; he also entered into a partnership in the lead mines in Wirksworth, which he drained by means of a sough.

== The Fens ==
The Fens in eastern England

Contrary to popular belief, Vermuyden was not involved with the draining of the "Great Fen" in Cambridgeshire and Norfolk in the 1630s. He did not participate until the second phase of construction in the 1650s. This area of marshland was naturally drained by a labyrinth of rivers. It had been inadequately maintained since before the Dissolution of the Monasteries in 1537 during the English Reformation, as the monasteries had been chiefly responsible in the region for keeping the channels clear. The initial plan for the drainage was based on a proposal by John Hunt in 1604-1605, to construct a new river 21 miles (34 km) long from Earith to Denver, shortening the length of the River Great Ouse by many miles. It was eventually named the Bedford River (subsequently Old Bedford River) after Francis Russell, 4th Earl of Bedford, who was the chief Adventurer and financier. The project created or improved eight other channels. The operation was judged as substantially complete in 1637. It was criticized for its limited goal to provide "summer lands", leaving the land subject to winter flooding.

The Merchant Adventurers had been offered 95,000 acres (380 km^{2}) by the Crown as the reward for their work. This settlement was disrupted: first by the riots, which erupted against the enclosures (and that occurred periodically into the 1650s), and second, by the King. He reversed the granting of Bedford's contract and declared himself as the principal in the project, taking 52,000 acres (210 km^{2}) and leaving the other parties with only 40,000 acres (160 km^{2}).

At this time, Vermuyden was recruited to participate in the Great Level, as in 1637 he wrote a Discourse Touching the Draining of the Great Fennes for the King (it was not published until 1642). In it, he proposed two innovations to the drainage scheme: washes – areas of land allowed to flood in periods of bad weather to absorb the extra water that cannot drain to the sea – and a catchdrain around the eastern edge of the fen. The washes were constructed as part of the second phase of drainage in the 1650s, but the catchdrain was not developed until the early 1960s. This catchdrain follows the contours of the western edge of the hilly brecklands where they rise above the fen, commencing in the south at Mildenhall through Hockwold cum Wilton northwards to Denver Sluice. At the latter village the River Little Ouse flows westwards off the brecks from Brandon enclosed within high embankments, over an aqueduct many feet higher than the catchment drain and surrounding farmland. Thus illustrating many of the anachronistic but brilliant features (in engineering terms), the work of Vermuyden commenced.

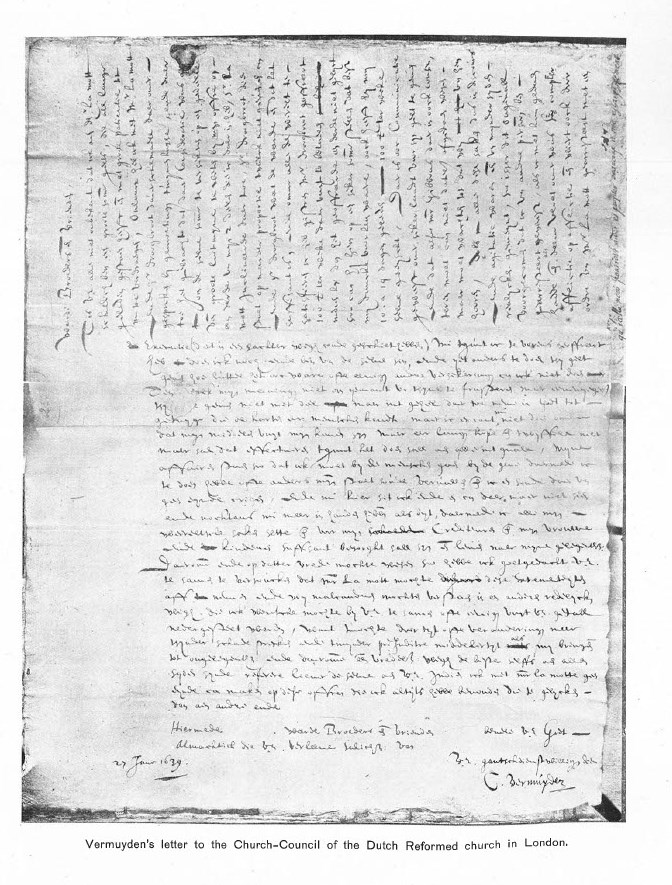
Letter by Vermuyden to the Church Council of the Dutch Reformed Church in London, 1639

Charles I appointed Vermuyden as his agent for the draining on 19 September 1639, but his government did not approve the plan until 5 August. In a precarious position with all three of its kingdoms, the Crown lacked both sufficient funds and attention to pay for the works in the Great Level, but it authorized Vermuyden to start. He widened the River Nene below Horseshoe Sluice, banking the north side of Morton's Leam. Beginning on the south, he set a new sluice, known as Shire Drain, and cut a new channel at the mouth of the Nene through the salt marshes to the sea. Vermuyden was still working in the Great Level as of May 1642, but was by then responding to the House of Lords, rather than the beleaguered King. Having received perhaps less than £5000, the engineer was continually in arrears for the wages of his workmen.

During the Civil War, the drainage project was halted by the chaos of war. The original financiers – now headed by Bedford's heir William – began to seek an Act of Parliament to overturn the King's takeover of their project and to gain restoration of all of the 95,000 acres (380 km^{2}) first awarded in January 1630/31. By 29 May 1649, a few months after the King's execution, they had succeeded; an Act of Parliament (later known as "The Pretended Act") restored them to the undertaking and gave their claim to the enclosures the force of law.

Before this time, Vermuyden's activities are not clear; there is some inconclusive evidence that one of his nephews may have acted as a colonel of horse in the parliamentary army, alongside Oliver Cromwell in the Eastern Association army. But with the beginning of the second phase of Bedford-led construction, Vermuyden was again appointed as the director of the works in January 1649/50.

This second phase included continuing the work of both the first and the King's (1.5 phase). In addition, he dredged the New Bedford River (with a large area of wash between it and the Bedford River) and the Forty Foot Drain. He established Denver Sluice to stop tides and flood water from depositing silt into the Great Ouse to the east of Ely. The work did not include his projected "cutoff channel," which was designed to take flood water from the southern rivers, the Wissey, Little Ouse and Lark, away from Denver. As a result, the area suffered continued flooding, which was not controlled until a project of the early 1960s. Due to the high cost of labour, and the continuing unpopularity of the project among the local inhabitants, the government provided Vermuyden with Scottish and Dutch prisoners of war (after the Battle of Dunbar in 1650) and the start of the war with the Dutch respectively) as labourers in this phase of construction.

Vermuyden's relationship with the other adventurers was never easy and, by 1655, they had parted company altogether. Several other of his initiatives failed, including a proposal for a treaty between England and the States-General of the Netherlands which he made to Cromwell. In addition, Vermuyden was unable to gain support to drain his areas of Sedgemoor and Malvern Chase.

== Personal life ==
Vermuyden married Katherine Lapps on 16 November, 1623, at St Mary's, Rotherhithe. One son, Cornelius Vermuyden Jr., became an Original Fellow of the Royal Society in 1663. He had a total of nine children with Katherine, including Charles, Deborah, Elizabeth, and John. His second wife was Dionysia Stonhouse.

Vermuyden lived in Maiden Lane, Covent Garden in 1647 and had a home in Kelfield, North Lincolnshire.

Vermuyden had moved to Westminster by 1657, and died on 11 October 1677. He was buried at St Margaret's Church, Westminster four days later.

== Reclamation results ==
Despite the initial success of the reclamation, the engineers did not understand enough about the ecology of the fens. The drying of the land caused the peat to shrink greatly, lowering the remaining land below the height of the drainage channels and rivers. This caused the reclaimed farmland to become vulnerable again to flooding. By the end of the 17th century, much of the reclaimed land was regularly flooded. This continued until the development of steam-powered pumps in the early 19th century. The drop in the land level can be seen at the pumps near Ramsey Forty Foot, where animal-powered pumps, steam pumps and now fossil-fuel pumps are all co-located, at different heights. They demonstrate both the development of technology and the resulting decline in land levels. Prickwillow Museum has a large pumping engine in working order, but not actively used.

== Legacy and honours ==
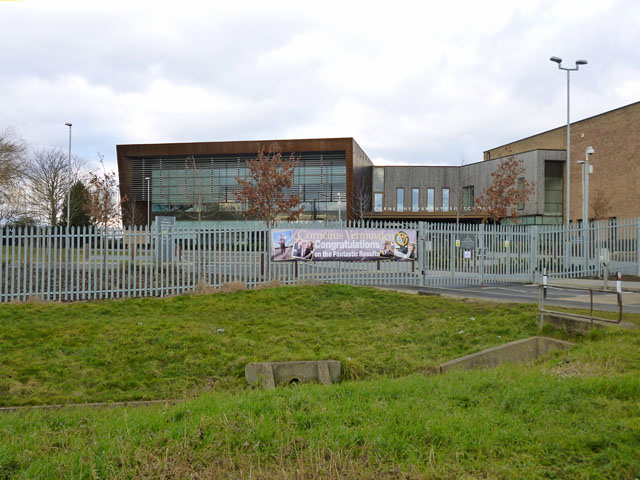
Cornelius Vermuyden School and Arts College, Canvey Island, Essex

Vermuyden has several locations named after him, including:

- Cornelius Vermuyden School and Arts College, Canvey Island, Essex.
- Vermuyden Hotel, Bridge Street, Goole, East Riding of Yorkshire.
- Vermuyden Medical Centre, Thorne, South Yorkshire.
- Vermuyden Road, Moorends, Doncaster, South Yorkshire.

He is also the namesake for the Vermuyden Group of South Yorks, a Long Distance Walkers Association based in South Yorkshire, and the Doncaster Schools Vermuyden Concert Band, the most senior Saturday afternoon band at William Appleby Music Centre in Doncaster. His motto Niet Zonder Arbyt ("Nothing Without Work") was adopted as the official motto of South Cambridgeshire District Council. The motto was adopted by No. 3 Group RAF and it appears in a memorial window in Ely Cathedral, installed in their honour.

Due to the Second Anglo-Dutch War and the Great Fire of London in 1666 (for which some blamed the Dutch), Cornelius Vermuyden decided to alter his surname, which over the years was further altered to what is today the surname Youdan, to which his descendants still live in the East Anglian region today.

== Sources ==
- Korthals-Altes, J. (1925). Sir Cornelius Vermuyden. London: Williams and Norgate.
- Skempton, Sir Alec; et al. (2002). A Biographical Dictionary of Civil Engineers in Great Britain and Ireland: Vol 1: 1500 to 1830. Thomas Telford. ISBN 978-0-7277-2939-2.
