= Big 5 Sporting Goods =

American sporting goods retailer

Big 5 Sporting Goods Corporation
- Trade name: Big 5 Sporting Goods
- Type: Subsidiary of Worldwide Sports Group Holdings LLC
- Traded as: Nasdaq: BGFV
- Industry: Sporting Goods; Outdoor Gear
- Predecessor: United Merchandising Corp.
- Founded: 1955; 71 years ago as United Merchandising Corp.
- Founder: Maurie Liff; Harry Liff; Robert Miller
- Headquarters: El Segundo, California, USA
- Number of locations: 410
- Key people: Theodore Shin (CEO); John Lucero (Chief Financial Officer)
- Revenue: ▼US$795.4 million(2024)
- Net income: ▼US$−69.0 million (2024)
- Total assets: ▼US$609.3 million (2024)
- Total equity: ▼US$175.6 million (2024)
- Owner: Worldwide Sports Group Holdings LLC; Capitol Hill Group
- Number of employees: 7,600 ≈2,100 full-time; ≈ 5,500 part-time
- Website: big5sportinggoods.com

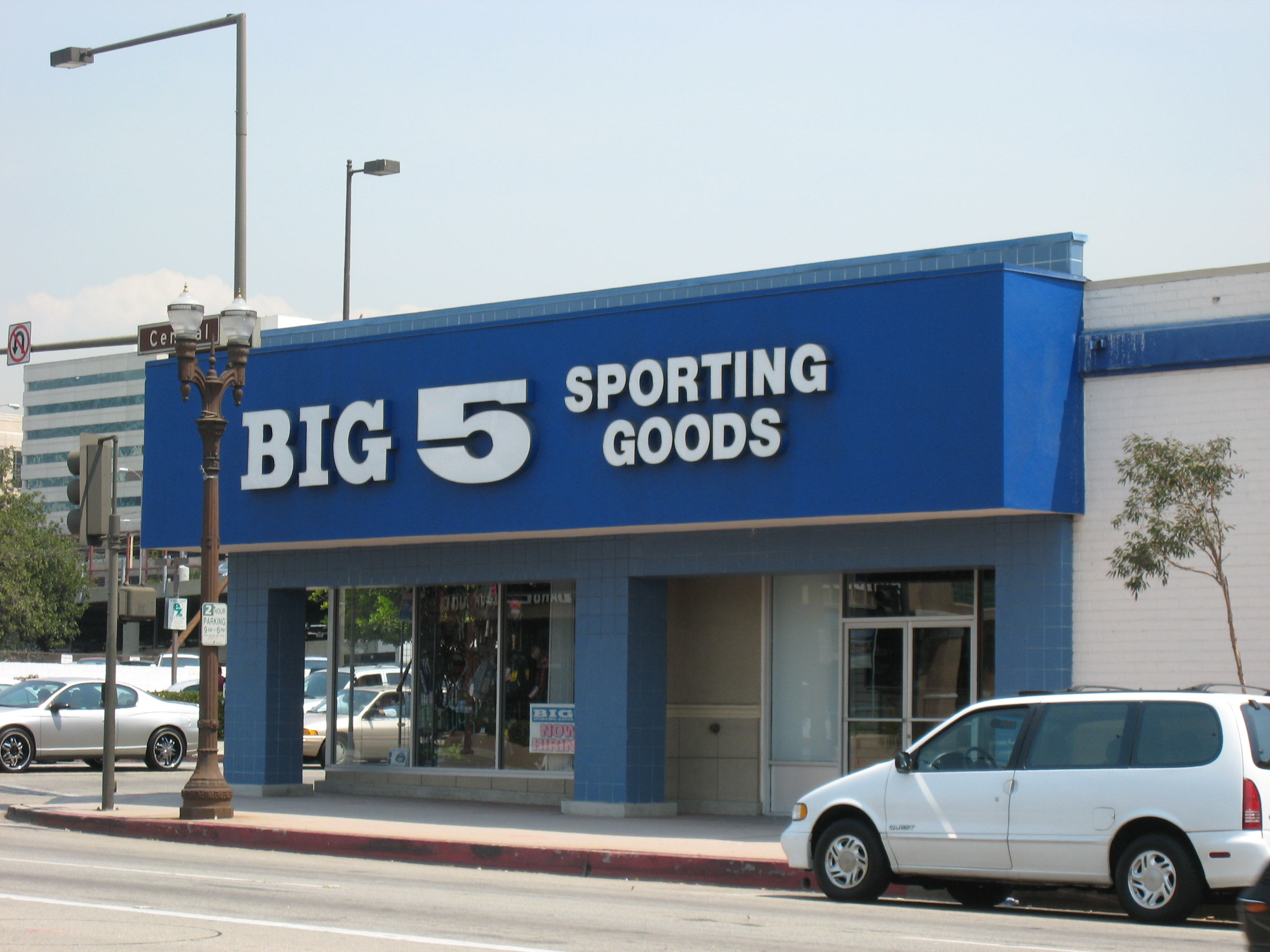
Big 5 Sporting Goods store in Glendale, California (2007)

Big 5 Sporting Goods Corporation is a sporting goods retailer headquartered in El Segundo, California, with 410 stores in the Western United States. Theodore Shin is the CEO as of January 2026.

== History ==
Founded in September 1955 by Maurie Liff, Harry Liff and Robert Miller, its name is derived from the first five Army surplus stores that were opened in California. Sportswest and Sportsland were acquired in May 1988 from Pay 'n Save.

In 1990, the company was fined $125,000 for selling discounted brand-name shoes that were actually poorly manufactured by those brands to be distributed only in Big 5 stores. For example, some New Balance models sold in Big 5 stores used a cardboard heel cup instead of a plastic heel cup. The investigation started when long-distance runner Gary Tuttle reported the oddly poor quality of the name-brand shoes he had purchased at Big 5 stores.

In 1997, Robert Miller and his son Steven G. Miller bought Big 5 back from Leonard Green & Partners, owners since 1992, by acquiring a majority stake. By then, the firm was making $400 million in revenue with 202 stores in 9 states.

In 2016, the company posted net sales of $1.02 billion with 432 stores in 11 States.

On June 29, 2025, Worldwide Golf Group and Capitol Hill Group reached an agreement valued at $33.6 million to acquire the company, with stockholders receiving $1.45 per share. On October 2, 2025, the transaction had been completed and Big 5 became a private company and merged with Worldwide Sports Holdings LLC. Big 5's common stock, which had traded under the ticker symbol BGFV, was delisted from the Nasdaq.

== Description ==
Big 5 is one of the largest sporting good retailers in the western United States. The average store is typically smaller than big-box competitors, with an average size of 12,000 square feet, but enables locations in both larger and smaller communities. The stores sell name-brand products and Big 5 products.

Big 5 stores sells firearms in some locations, but face local regulations regarding the secure sale of firearms.
