= Cornelius Vermuyden School =

The Cornelius Vermuyden School

Location
- Dinant Avenue; Canvey Island, Essex, SS8 9QS; England
- 51°31′34″N 0°34′10″E

Information
- Type: Academy
- Specialists: Arts, mathematics and computing
- Department for Education URN: 140308 Tables
- Ofsted: Reports
- Headteacher: Dee Conlon
- Gender: Coeducational
- Age: 11 to 16
- Enrolment: 900 pupils
- Website: http://www.corneliusvermuyden.com

Cornelius Vermuyden School is a secondary school with academy status for boys and girls ages 11–16. Located on Canvey Island, Essex, the school is named after the Dutch land engineer Sir Cornelius Vermuyden (1595-1683) who reclaimed large areas of fenland in England, and supervised the construction of the sea walls around Canvey in 1623. The school is a specialist arts and maths and computing college.

== History ==
The original school was planned in the 1960s as Cornelius Vermuyden Comprehensive School by Essex County Council and in 1970 a tender was awarded to Higgins Construction for £320,000 to build the new establishment. The new school situated in Dinant Avenue opened in September 1972 and was set in 38 acres of ground. The school was granted Arts College status and pupils from the school were involved in the creation of a large mosaic on Canvey seafront in 2007. The project was funded by Essex County Council and the BP petrol company, and the results earned the praise of the chairman of Castle Point Council's environment committee. The school holds the Sportsmark award and the Specialist Schools Trust have recognised the school in their 'Most Improved Schools Club'.

As part of the Essex County Council education review for secondary education on Canvey Island, Cornelius Vermuyden School was chosen along with Castle View School to stay open and were rebuilt as part of the Building Schools for the Future programme. Designed by Nicholas Hare Architects, the new buildings were built in between 2010 and 2012 and constructed by a consortium led by Skanska. The design was nominated for an award by RIBA in 2012. The school became an academy in November 2013.

== Notable pupils ==
Billy Knott - English footballer
