= Satanic School =

The Satanic School was a name applied by Robert Southey to a class of writers headed by Byron and Shelley, because, according to him, their productions were "characterized by a Satanic spirit of pride and audacious impiety".

The term was, therefore, initially coined in Southey's A Vision of Judgement (1821) as one of opprobrium and moral condemnation. However, Byron took some delight in Southey's description of him as an author of "monstrous combinations of horrors and mockery, lewdness and impiety". Byron responded to Southey with his own Vision of Judgment (n.b. the "reformist" spelling), where Southey appears as a scribbler writing encomiums on weak kings. Byron, however, additionally took up the theme of a "Satanic" school and developed the "Byronic hero" (not to be confused with Samuel Taylor Coleridge's "Satanic Hero") who would, like Satan in Paradise Lost, be a tragic figure who is admirable even when wrong. Charles Baudelaire's poète maudit would emerge from the Byronic hero.

Thomas Carlyle responded to this new anti-hero and accused Byron and Shelley of wasting their breath in a fierce "wrangle with the devil", having "not the courage to fairly face and honestly fight him". Byron, in the materials surrounding Manfred, would suggest that these characters are not paragons of bourgeois virtues but are, rather, creatures of fire and spirit.

== See also ==
- 1821 in poetry, the year A Vision of Judgement was published

== Bibliography ==
- Metzger, Lore. "Satanic School" in Alex Preminger and T.V.F. Brogan, eds., The New Princeton Encyclopedia of Poetry and Poetics. Princeton, NJ: Princeton University Press, 1993. 1114.
- Wood, James (1907). "Satanic School". The Nuttall Encyclopædia. London and New York: Frederick Warne & Co..
