= Justice Hunt =

Justice Hunt may refer to:

- Ward Hunt (1810–1886), associate justice of the U.S. Supreme Court
- Albert C. Hunt (1888–1956), associate justice of the Oklahoma Supreme Court
- John Hunt (Michigan judge) (died 1927), associate justice of the Michigan Supreme Court
- William Henry Hunt (judge) (1857–1949), associate justice of the Montana Supreme Court
- William E. Hunt (1923–2016), associate justice of the Montana Supreme Court
- Willis B. Hunt Jr. (born 1932), associate justice of the Georgia Supreme Court

== See also ==
- Judge Hunt (disambiguation)
