= Judge Hunt =

Judge Hunt may refer to:

- LaShonda A. Hunt (born 1970), judge of the United States District Court for the Northern District of Illinois
- Roger L. Hunt (born 1942), judge of the United States District Court for the District of Nevada
- Ward Hunt (1810–1886), judge of the New York Court of Appeals prior to his appointment to the Supreme Court of the United States
- William H. Hunt (1823–1884), judge of the United States Court of Claims
- William Henry Hunt (judge) (1857–1949), judge of the United States Court of Appeals for the Ninth Circuit
- Willis B. Hunt Jr. (born 1932), judge of the United States District Court for the Northern District of Georgia

== See also ==
- Justice Hunt (disambiguation)
