= Gary Tuttle =

American long-distance runner (born 1947)

Gary Tuttle (born October 12, 1947) is an American long-distance runner and local politician from Ventura, California. Over a lengthy career, he won two NCAA Men's Outdoor Track and Field Championships, set three American records, ran for the USA team at the IAAF World Cross Country Championships, won the Bay to Breakers race in 1974 and placed second in the Boston Marathon in 1985.

== Running success ==
Tuttle was the son of Ventura High School Basketball coach Bob Tuttle (for whom the gymnasium at that high school is named), but went to cross-town rival Buena High School, playing traditional sports basketball and baseball. Running with the baseball team, he happened upon the distance running team and found he could keep up with them. He was asked to join Jim Hunt's Cross Country team. He finally joined the track team in his senior year, 1965, the first year the 2 mile race was held officially in California high schools.

His Buena High school coach Jim Hunt followed him to Humboldt State University, where Tuttle won the Division II National Championship in the steeplechase in 1968 and 1969, setting the record in that event both times.

After being drafted into the Army, serving as a conscientious objector, Tuttle continued to run. It was at this time he attempted his first marathon, finishing second in the first and winning the second. In 1975 he was the fourth ranked marathoner in the United States and was considering himself a marathoner. He won the National Championships in the Marathon in both 1975 and 1976 Only one person since Tuttle has successfully repeated as National Champion He also was the first National Champion at 15 kilometers and also won the National Championship at 25 kilometers. He placed seventh overall at the 1976 IAAF World Cross Country Championships.

At the Olympic Trials he finished 7th in the 10,000 metres in 1976 and also made the trials in 1980 and 1984. William Harvey was his coach. He also ran in the Marathon trials in 1976. He continued to do marathons and in 1985 finished second in the Boston Marathon behind England's Geoff Smith's repeat victory. It was kind of unexpected for the 37-year-old accompanying his future wife, Ruth Vomund to her first visit to the event.

One key or result from Tuttle's success is he possessed one of the highest VO_{2} max capabilities recorded. After a career of Marathons, Tuttle has come to realize that the marathon distance is not his best, pointing to his lifetime personal record in the 10,000 meters of 28:26 as indicating he should have been able to run a marathon six minutes faster.

Feeling like a bullet-proof long distance runner, Tuttle found his undoing in attempting a remarkable stunt—running his age on his birthday. When he turned 39, he ran 39 miles. While he successfully negotiated that ordeal, without taking time off, he continued to train as he had for the last two decades. He injured his hamstrings to the point that he was never able to run without pain, though he has continued to run sporadically into his 60s.

== Businessman ==
For three decades (1976 to 2007), Tuttle owned the Inside Track Running Store in Ventura, creating and coaching the Team Inside Track team of local community runners. The best of those runner, the TIT Racing Team, included Vomund and eventual CIF California State Meet champion Josh Spiker, who would buy the store from Tuttle in 2007. During this period, Tuttle was instrumental in the organization of several dozen races every year and worked as a starter or official for dozens more.

In 1988, he reported a suspiciously poor quality with the name-brand running shoes sold at Big 5 Sporting Goods stores. The attorney general opened an investigation, and the sports retailer was fined $125,000 in 1990 for making deals with brands to manufacture low-quality shoes for distribution in Big 5 stores only, but advertising them as regular models.

== Political office ==
Tuttle was part of a pro-environmental wave of candidates that won seats on the Ventura City Council in 1989. He was re-elected in 1993 against a wave of pro-growth candidates, rising to the position of Deputy Mayor. In frustration with the direction of the council, Tuttle chose not to seek a third term.

I don't want to end up a grouchy old man, I don't like it, so I'm going to get out of it.

Tuttle is now active as a leader in the Ventura County Democratic Party.

In 1989, Tuttle was elected into the Ventura County Sports Hall of Fame.
