= Thomas Hunt =

Thomas or Tom Hunt may refer to:

== Politicians ==
- Thomas Hunt (MP for Bishop's Lynn) (died 1433), MP for Bishop's Lynn
- Thomas Hunt (MP for Bedford fl.1420) (fl. 1420), MP for Bedford
- Thomas Hunt (MP for Great Yarmouth) (died 1560), MP for Great Yarmouth
- Thomas Hunt (MP for Shrewsbury), in 1645 and 1648, MP for Shrewsbury
- Thomas Hunt (Australian politician) (1841–1934)
- Tom Hunt (politician), MP for Ipswich elected 2019

== Others ==
- Thomas Hunt (madrigalist) (c. 1580–1658), English composer and madrigalist who contributed to The Triumphs of Oriana, 1601
- Thomas Hunt (footballer) (1908–1975), formerly with Norwich City F.C.
- Thomas Hunt (martyr) (died 1600), Englishman martyred with Thomas Sprott in 1600
- Thomas Hunt (Arabic scholar) (1696–1774), professor of Arabic and of Hebrew at the University of Oxford
- Thomas Hunt (slaver) (17th century), John Smith's lieutenant; took Squanto to Europe from modern-day Massachusetts
- Thomas Hunt (soldier) (1754–1808), American Army officer
- Thomas Hunt (speech therapist) (1802–1851), English inventor of a treatment for stammering
- Thomas Sterry Hunt (1826–1892), American geologist and chemist
- Thomas Cecil Hunt (1901–1980), English physician
- Thomas Lorraine Hunt, Canadian-American landscape painter
- Tom Hunt (executive) (1923–2008), American petroleum industry executive
- Tommy Hunt (1933–2025), American singer
- Tom Hunt (cricketer) (1819–1858), English cricketer

== See also ==
- Thomas James De la Hunt (1866–1933), American newspaper columnist, writer, and historian
- Hunt (surname)
