= Jack Hunt =

Jack Hunt may refer to:

- Jack Hunt (American football) (born 1981), American football safety
- Jack Hunt (RAF officer) (1899–1954), English World War I flying ace
- Jack Hunt (footballer) (born 1990), English footballer for Bristol Rovers
- Jack Hunt (politician) (1922–2020), American dentist and politician
- Jack Hunt (speedway rider) (1921–1991), New Zealand speedway rider

== See also ==
- Jack Hunt School, a school in Netherton, Peterborough, United Kingdom
- John Hunt (disambiguation)
