= Robert Hunt (critic) =

Robert Hunt (fl. 1809) was an English writer. His infamous reviews of the works of William Blake are amongst the earliest criticism of the poet and painter.

Robert was the brother of Leigh Hunt, the well-known writer, and John Hunt (1775–1848), who founded the Examiner; his writing appeared in this influential journal.

His work might have remained in obscurity, if not for a vitriolic attack on the works and character of Blake during 1808 and 1809. The second of these reviews was of Blake's exhibition at Golden Square in London, his illustrations to Chaucer's The Canterbury Tales and its Descriptive Catalogue. Hunt's review of both these works was pungent, after the failure of the exhibition Blake's response was no less so,

'The manner in which my character has been blasted these thirty years, both as an artist and as a man, may be seen particularly in a Sunday paper called the Examiner, published in Beaufort's Buildings; the manner in which I have rooted out the nest of villains will be seen in a poem concerning my three years' Herculean labours at Felpham, which I shall soon publish.'—Blake, W., Ms. (the "Rossetti Manuscript")

Hunt's notice added emphasis to a selection of quotes from Blake's Descriptive Catalogue, as a preface "to amuse the reader, and satisfy him of the truth of the foregoing remarks." What follows is what Arthur Symons described as "among the infamies of journalism". After a moralistic critique of 'insanity' permeating the arts, he focuses on his example,

"… But when the ebullitions of a distempered brain are mistaken for the sallies of genius by those whose works have exhibited the soundest thinking in art, the malady has indeed attained a pernicious height, and it becomes a duty to endeavour to arrest its progress. Such is the case with the productions and admirers of William Blake, an unfortunate lunatic, whose personal inoffensiveness secures him from confinement, and, consequently, of whom no public notice would have been taken, if he was not forced on the notice and animadversion of The Examiner, in having been held up to public admiration by many esteemed amateurs and professors as a genius in some respect original and legitimate. The praises which these gentlemen bestowed last year on this unfortunate man's illustrations to Blair's Grave have, in feeding his vanity, stimulated him to publish his madness more largely, and thus again exposed him, if not to the derision, at least to the pity of the public. ... Thus encouraged, the poor man fancies himself a great master, and has painted a few wretched pictures, some of which are unintelligible allegory, others an attempt at sober character by caricature representation, and the whole "blotted and blurred," and very badly drawn. These he calls an Exhibition, of which he has published a Catalogue, or rather a farrago of nonsense, unintelligibleness, and egregious vanity, the wild effusions of a distempered brain. One of the pictures represents Chaucer's Pilgrims, and is in every respect a striking contrast to the admirable picture of the same subject by Mr. Stothard, from which an exquisite print is forthcoming from the hand of Schiavonetti."—Hunt, R., The Examiner

An earlier review in 1808 is given with his initials, "R.H.", two columns that contain the only notice published on the publication of Blake's illustrations to Blair's The Grave under the heading 'Fine Arts'. It was here that the paper's wild and moralistic criticism, calling for censure of Blake's "libidinous" depictions and descriptions of his works as "absurdities". Further remarks were added by R. H Leigh Hunt, then editor of the Examiner, listing Blake as a "quack".

Hunt's "extravagantly malicious attack" on these works was countered in Blake's notebooks, and, as some later critics contend, satirised in his poetry. Contemporary notices that followed echoed the sentiments expressed, but the partisan view of a coddled and talentless madman was submerged by biographical and critical notices that ranged from sympathetic to unconstrained adoration.
