= George Hunt =

George Hunt may refer to:

== Sport ==
- George Hunt (American football) (born 1949), American football player
- George Hunt (footballer, born 1910) (1910–1996), English international footballer for Tottenham Hotspur and Arsenal
- George Hunt (footballer, born 1922) (1922–1987), English footballer for Swindon Town
- George E. Hunt (1896–1959), medium-pace bowler who made over 200 appearances for Somerset
- George R. Hunt (1873–1960), right-handed batsman who made one appearance for Somerset
- George Hunt (rower) (1916–1999), American rower

== Others ==
- George Hunt (artist) (1933–2020), American expressionist painter
- George Hunt (attorney) (1841–1901), American politician
- George Hunt (ethnologist) (1854–1933), Canadian ethnologist
- George Hunt (merchant) (1845–1911), store proprietor in Adelaide, South Australia
- George Hunt (trombonist) (1906–1946), American jazz trombonist
- George Edward Hunt (jeweller) (1892–1960), Birmingham Arts and Crafts jeweller
- George F. Hunt (1831–1888), American politician and physician
- George W. P. Hunt (1859–1934), first governor of the State of Arizona
- George Ward Hunt (1825–1877), British politician
- George Hunt (British Army officer) (1830–1882), credited as the founder of Huntsville, Ontario, Canada
- George Hunt (Royal Navy officer) (1916–2011), highly decorated Second World War submarine commander
- George Hunt (MP) (c. 1720–1798), British politician
- George Nelson Hunt III (1931–2022), Episcopal bishop of Rhode Island
- G. W. Hunt (George William Hunt, 1837–1904), English writer of music hall songs
