= William Hunt =

William, Bill, or Billy Hunt may refer to:

== Arts and entertainment ==
- William Henry Hunt (painter) (1790–1864), nicknamed ‘Bird’s Nest’ Hunt, English water-colour painter
- William Morris Hunt (1824–1879), American painter
- William Holman Hunt (1827–1910), British painter
- William Leonard Hunt (1838–1929), American/Canadian entertainment promoter
- William Dennis Hunt (1944–2020), American actor
- Bill Hunt (musician) (born 1947), American musician
- Will Hunt (born 1971), American drummer
- W. M. Hunt, American photography curator and consultant

== Business and industry ==
- William Hunt (banker) (fl. 1749–1752), Governor of the Bank of England
- Sir William Hunt (businessman) (1867–1939), New Zealand business leader, stock and station agent
- William Herbert Hunt (1929–2024), American oil baron

== Law and politics ==
- William Henry Hunt (judge) (1857–1949), United States judge
- William Henry Hunt (diplomat) (1863–1951), United States diplomat
- William E. Hunt (1923–2016), American jurist in Montana

== Sports ==
- Bill Hunt (racing driver) (1890–1950), American racing driver
- William Hunt (sprinter) (1898–1977), Australian Olympic sprinter
- Bill Hunt (cricketer) (1908–1983), Australian cricketer
- Bill Hunt (alpine skier) (1929–2009), New Zealand Olympic skier
- Billy Hunt (footballer) (born 1934), English footballer
- William Hunt (rugby union), English rugby union player
- Willie Hunt (born 1987), American soccer player

== Others ==
- Wilson Price Hunt (1783–1842), or William, American pioneer in the Oregon Country
- William H. Hunt (1823–1884), United States Secretary of the Navy
- William Hunt (priest, born c. 1669), archdeacon of Bath
- William Hunt (priest, born 1842) (1842–1931), English clergyman and historian
- Warren Hunt (bishop) (William Warren Hunt, 1909–1994), British cleric, bishop of Repton
- William Hunt (officer of arms) (born 1946), English Officer of Arms
- William D. G. Hunt (born 1955), British Army officer and landmine campaigner

== See also ==
- William Hunt and Sons, a British brand of masonry tools and other types of edge tools
- Hunt (surname)
- William Henry Hunt (disambiguation)
