= David Hunt =

David or Dave Hunt may refer to:

== Sports ==
- David Hunt (footballer, born 1982), English football defender (Oxford United)
- David Hunt (footballer, born 1959), English football midfielder (Notts County)
- David Hunt (footballer, born 1980), English football defender (Darlington)
- David Hunt (racing driver) (1960–2015), English racing driver
- David Hunt (sailor) (born 1934), English sailor
- David Hunt (rower) (born 1991), South African rower
- David Hunt (badminton) (born 1945), English badminton player

== Others ==
- David Hunt (actor) (born 1953), English actor
- David Hunt, Baron Hunt of Wirral (born 1942), British Conservative politician
- David Hunt (botanist) (1938–2019), English botanist and taxonomist
- David Hunt (diplomat) (1913–1998), Mastermind winner and former British ambassador to Brazil
- David Hunt (gangster) (born 1961), English organised crime boss
- David Hunt (judge) (1935–2019), Australian judge
- David Hunt (ornithologist) (1934–1985), English ornithologist and birdwatcher
- David Hunt (planter) (1779–1861), American plantation owner
- David Hunt (video game streamer) (born 1985), known online as GrandPooBear, a video game streamer, speedrunner, and creator of Kaizo Mario levels
- Dave Hunt (Christian apologist) (1926–2013), American theologian
- Dave Hunt (musician), English heavy metal singer
- Dave Hunt (Oregon politician) (born 1967), member of Oregon's State House of Representatives and former Speaker of the House
- Dave Hunt (artist) (1942–2017), American comic book artist
- David Hunt (streamer) (born 1985), American video game streamer
