= John Hunt (Quaker exile) =

Exiled with other Quakers without justification to Virginia during the Revolutionary War

- Born: 1712
- Died: March 31, 1778 (aged 65–66); Frederick County, Virginia
- Occupation: Merchant
- Spouses: Unknown; Rachel Tory
- Children: Dorothea; Elizabeth; John Jr.

John Hunt (1712 – March 31, 1778) was one of the Virginia Exiles, who were a group of Philadelphia area Quakers that were forcibly exiled to Winchester, Virginia during the Revolutionary War.

Prior to 1769, John Hunt was a London merchant and shipper dealing in tobacco and general merchandise. Between 1738 and 1768, John Hunt made several voyages between London, Philadelphia and Virginia.

In 1769, John Hunt, a widower, emigrated to the province of Pennsylvania with his three children: Dorothea, Elizabeth and John. The Hunt family settled near Philadelphia at Darby. John Hunt married Rachel Tory, a widow, on November 28, 1769.

Some modern writers have confused the John Hunt (1712 – 1778), who is the subject of this article, with another Quaker named John Hunt (1711 – 1729. Adding to the confusion, another Quaker minister by the name of John Hunt (1740 – 1824) also lived near Philadelphia.
