= Robert Hunt =

Robert Hunt may refer to:

== Sportspeople ==
- Bobby Hunt (American football) (1940–2026), American football defensive back
- Rob Hunt (American football) (born 1981), American football offensive lineman
- Robert Hunt (American football, born 1996), American football offensive lineman
- Robert Hunt (American football coach) (born 1975), American football offensive lineman and coach
- Bobby Hunt (footballer, born 1934), English football wing half
- Bobby Hunt (footballer, born 1942), English football forward
- Rob Hunt (footballer) (born 1995), English football fullback
- Robert Hunt (cricketer, born 1915) (1915–2010), English cricketer
- Robert Hunt (cricketer, born 1903) (1903–1983), English cricketer
- Robert Hunt (rugby union, born 1856) (1856–1913), English rugby union player
- Robert Hunt (rugby union, born 1996), South African rugby union player

== Others ==
- Robert Hunt (chaplain) (c. 1568–1608), chaplain of the English expedition that founded Jamestown, Virginia, in 1607
- Robert Hunt (colonial administrator), English governor of the Providence Island colony from 1636 to 1638
- Robert Hunt (scientist) (1807–1887), English scientist in mineralogy and mining
- Robert Hunt (critic) (fl.1809), English writer
- Robert H. Hunt (1839–1908), Union Army Colonel during the American Civil War and mayor of Kansas City, Missouri
- Robert Hunt (illustrator) (born 1952), American illustrator and painter
- Robert W. Hunt (1838–1923), American metallurgical engineer
- Robert Hunt (actor), American musical theater actor in Boobs! The Musical
- Robert Hunt (Parliamentarian) (c. 1609–1680), English lawyer and politician
- Robert Hunt (police officer) (1935–2013), British police officer
- Robert L. Hunt (1933–2013), known as Bob, fisheries biologist
- Robert M. Hunt (1828–1902), American physician in California
- Robert O. Hunt (1873–?), American politician
- Robert Hunt (poet) (1906–1964), poet and partner of Witter Bynner
- Jim Kouf (born 1951), American screenwriter and director, sometimes credited as Bob Hunt

== See also ==
- Robert G. Dela Hunt (1912–1970), American lawyer and politician
