= Alfred Hunt =

Alfred Hunt may refer to:

- Alfred Hunt (steel magnate) (1817–1888), founding president of the company that became Bethlehem Steel Corporation
- Alfred E. Hunt (1855–1899), founder of the company that became the aluminum company Alcoa
- Alfred William Hunt (1830–1896), English painter
- Alfred Hunt (politician) (1861–1930), Australian politician

== See also ==
- Albert Hunt (disambiguation)
