= William Henry Hunt =

William Henry Hunt may refer to:

- William H. Hunt (1823–1884), United States Secretary of the Navy
- William Henry Hunt (judge) (1857–1949), state and federal judge and a territorial governor of Puerto Rico
- William Henry Hunt (painter) (1790–1864), English watercolour painter
- William Henry Hunt (diplomat) (1863–1951), United States diplomat

== See also ==
- William Hunt (disambiguation)
- Henry Hunt (disambiguation)
