= Walter Hunt =

Walter Hunt may refer to:

- Walter Hunt (inventor) (1796–1859), American mechanic and inventor
- Walter Hunt (politician) (1868–1942), member of the Wisconsin State Senate
- W. Ben Hunt (1888–1970), American artist and author
- Wally Hunt (1909–1963). English footballer and cricketer
- Walter H. Hunt (born 1959), American science fiction novelist
- Walter Hunt (architect) (1870–1940), architect in Australia

== See also ==
- Hunt (surname)
- Hunt (disambiguation)
