= Michael John Hunt =

English painter

- Born: 1941 (age 84–85); England
- Education: Self-taught
- Known for: Painting

Michael John Hunt is an English figurative painter and etcher.

== Life ==
Born in England 1941, Hunt is entirely self-taught. He creates his pictures with layered acrylics and glazes.

== Paintings ==
Hunt is known mainly for his still lifes, which are often depictions of intimate interiors both grand and rustic. The scenes are characteristically adorned with familiar objects, particularly empty chairs, dramatically illuminated by a specific light source emanating from a window or doorway. Like the Dutch masters, the surfaces in his paintings are pristine, allowing for the demonstration of technical proficiency though realistic lighting effects such as shadows and reflections.

== Exhibitions ==
He has work permanently on view at The Hunt Gallery in England and the Eleanor Ettinger Gallery in New York. He has also participated in The Royal Academy Summer Exhibition for 6 years, the Paris Salon, National Art Collection Fund and the Society of Equestrian Artists.

== Collections ==
- Lord and Lady Northbourne
- Princess Michael of Kent
- University of Kent
- Pfizer, Inc.
- Royal Marines School of Music
- Dr. T.E. Westerterp
- The Town Museum, Venlo, Netherlands

=== Winterthur Museum ===
As of 2012, Hunt is creating a collection of paintings of the Winterthur Museum featuring the rooms, spaces, and grounds. The project began in 1996 and is still in progress. In order to maintain the integrity of the collection, none of the original paintings have been sold. However, Hunt has decided to publish these paintings in limited editions of fine art prints. The Hunt Gallery has announced that the proceeds from sales of these prints will go to the Winterthur Museum.

=== Wynkoop House ===
Hunt is currently creating a collection of paintings of Wynkoop House. None of these paintings are currently available for sale.
