= John David Hunt =

British metallurgist

John David Hunt FRS (12 December 1936 – 8 December 2012) was a British metallurgist. His research career was mainly based at the University of Oxford, from 1966 to 2002.

His legacy includes the Institute of Materials, Minerals and Mining's John Hunt Medal, awarded for 'outstanding contribution to the science and/or technology of casting and solidification of metals'. He was elected Fellow of the Royal Society in 2001.
