= Jonathan Hunt =

Jonathan Hunt may refer to:

- Jonathan Hunt (New Zealand politician) (1938–2024), politician from New Zealand
- Jonathan Hunt (Vermont congressman) (1787–1832), U.S. Representative from Vermont
- Jonathan Hunt (Vermont lieutenant governor) (1738–1823), Vermont Lieutenant Governor
- Jonathan Hunt (footballer) (born 1971), English footballer
- Jonathan Hunt, vocalist of Dead to Fall
- Joth Hunt (born 1986), vocalist of Planetshakers
- Jonathon Hunt (born 1981), American figure skater
- Jon Hunt (born 1953), founder of the Foxtons estate agency

== See also ==
- John Hunt (disambiguation)
