= The Examiner (1808–1886) =

British weekly newspaper (1808–1886)

- The Examiner 1808-01-03: Issue 1
- Founder(s): Leigh Hunt and John Hunt
- Founded: 1808; 218 years ago
- Ceased publication: 1886; 140 years ago
- Language: English
- City: London
- Country: Britain
- Circulation: 6,000 (as of 1840)

The Examiner was a British weekly paper founded by Leigh and John Hunt in 1808. For the first fifty years it was a leading intellectual journal expounding radical principles, but from 1865 it repeatedly changed hands and political allegiance, resulting in a rapid decline in readership and loss of purpose. The paper ceased publication in 1886.

== Early history ==
While The Examiner was in the hands of John and Leigh Hunt, the sub-title was "A Sunday paper, on politics, domestic economy, and theatricals", and the newspaper devoted itself to providing independent reports on each of these areas. It consistently published leading writers of the day, including Lord Byron, Mary Shelley, Percy Bysshe Shelley, John Keats and William Hazlitt. The Hunt brothers failed in their initial aspiration to refuse advertisements in an effort to increase impartiality. In the first edition, the editor claimed The Examiner would pursue "truth for its sole object"; the paper's radical reformist principles resulted in a series of high-profile prosecutions of the editors. A tradition of publishing accurate news and witty criticisms of domestic and foreign politics was continued by Albany Fonblanque, who took over the paper in 1828.

Until Fonblanque sold The Examiner in the mid-1860s, the newspaper took the form of a sixteen-page journal priced at 6d, designed to be kept and repeatedly referred to.

== Later times ==
Albany Fonblanque, the journal's political commentator since 1826, took over The Examiner in 1830, serving as editor until 1847. He brought in such contributors as John Stuart Mill, John Forster, William Makepeace Thackeray, and most notably Charles Dickens. Fonblanque also wrote the first notice of Sketches by Boz (28 February 1836) and of The Pickwick Papers (4 September 1836). Forster became the magazine's literary editor in 1835, and succeeded Fonblanque as editor from 1847 to 1855. Forster himself was succeeded by Marmion Savage.

Circulation per issue varied over time. In 1829, it was 5,200, 1837 (3,900), 1840 (6,000), 1845 (5,100) and 1854 (4,800).

The Examiner's reputation was undermined when the new owner, William McCullagh Torrens, halved the price of the publication in 1867. Although its tradition of radical intellectual commentaries was revived in the 1870s under the editorship of William Minto, The Examiner was repeatedly sold until the final edition appeared in February 1881.

The magazine ceased publication in 1886.
