= Leigh Hunt =

English critic, essayist and poet (1784–1859)

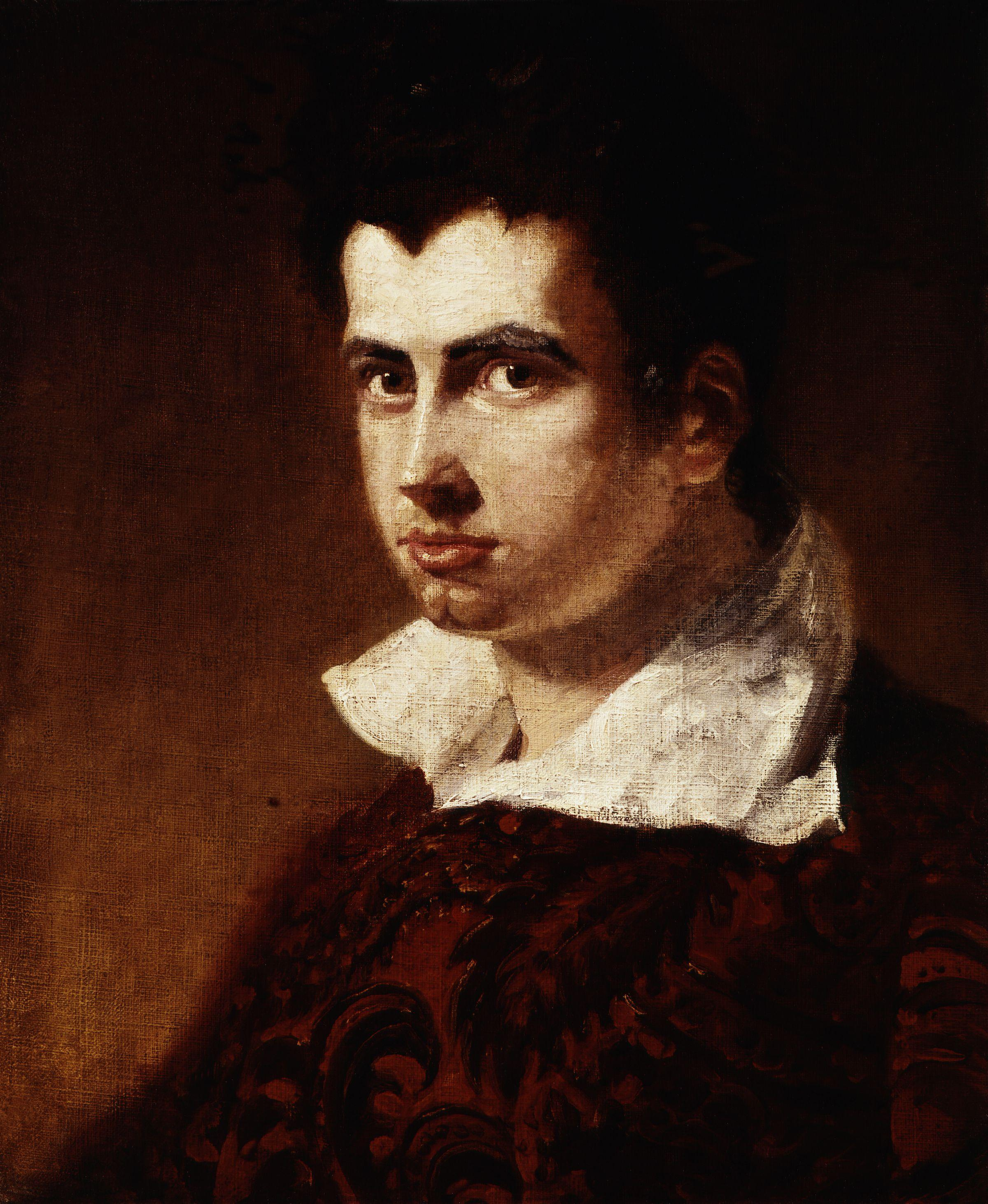
- Portrait by Benjamin Haydon
- Born: James Henry Leigh Hunt; 19 October 1784; Southgate, London, England
- Died: 28 August 1859 (aged 74); Putney, London, England
- Burial place: Kensal Green Cemetery
- Education: Christ's Hospital, Newgate Street, London
- Spouse: Marianne Kent (m. 1808; died 1857)
- Children: 10, including Thornton Leigh Hunt
- Relatives: John Hunt (brother); Robert Hunt (brother); Elizabeth Kent (sister-in-law); Chandos Leigh Hunt Wallace (grand-niece)

James Henry Leigh Hunt (19 October 1784 – 28 August 1859), best known as Leigh Hunt, was an English critic, essayist and poet.

Hunt co-founded The Examiner, a leading intellectual journal expounding radical principles, with his brother John Hunt. He was the centre of the Hampstead-based group that included William Hazlitt and Charles Lamb, known as the "Hunt circle". Hunt also introduced John Keats, Percy Bysshe Shelley, Robert Browning and Alfred Tennyson to the public.

He may be best remembered for being sentenced to prison for two years on charges of libel against the Prince Regent (1813–1815).

Hunt's presence at Shelley's funeral on the beach near Viareggio was immortalised in the painting by Louis Édouard Fournier. Hunt inspired aspects of the Harold Skimpole character in Charles Dickens' novel Bleak House.

== Early life ==
James Henry Leigh Hunt was born on 19 October 1784, at Southgate, London, where his parents had settled after leaving the United States. His father, Isaac, a lawyer from Philadelphia, and his mother, Mary Shewell, a merchant's daughter and a devout Quaker, had been forced to come to Britain because of their Loyalist sympathies during the American War of Independence. Some biographers have suggested Hunt was had West Indian ancestry on his father's side.

Once in England, Isaac Hunt became a popular preacher but was unsuccessful in obtaining a permanent living. He was then employed by James Brydges, 3rd Duke of Chandos, as tutor to his nephew, James Henry Leigh for whom Isaac named his son.

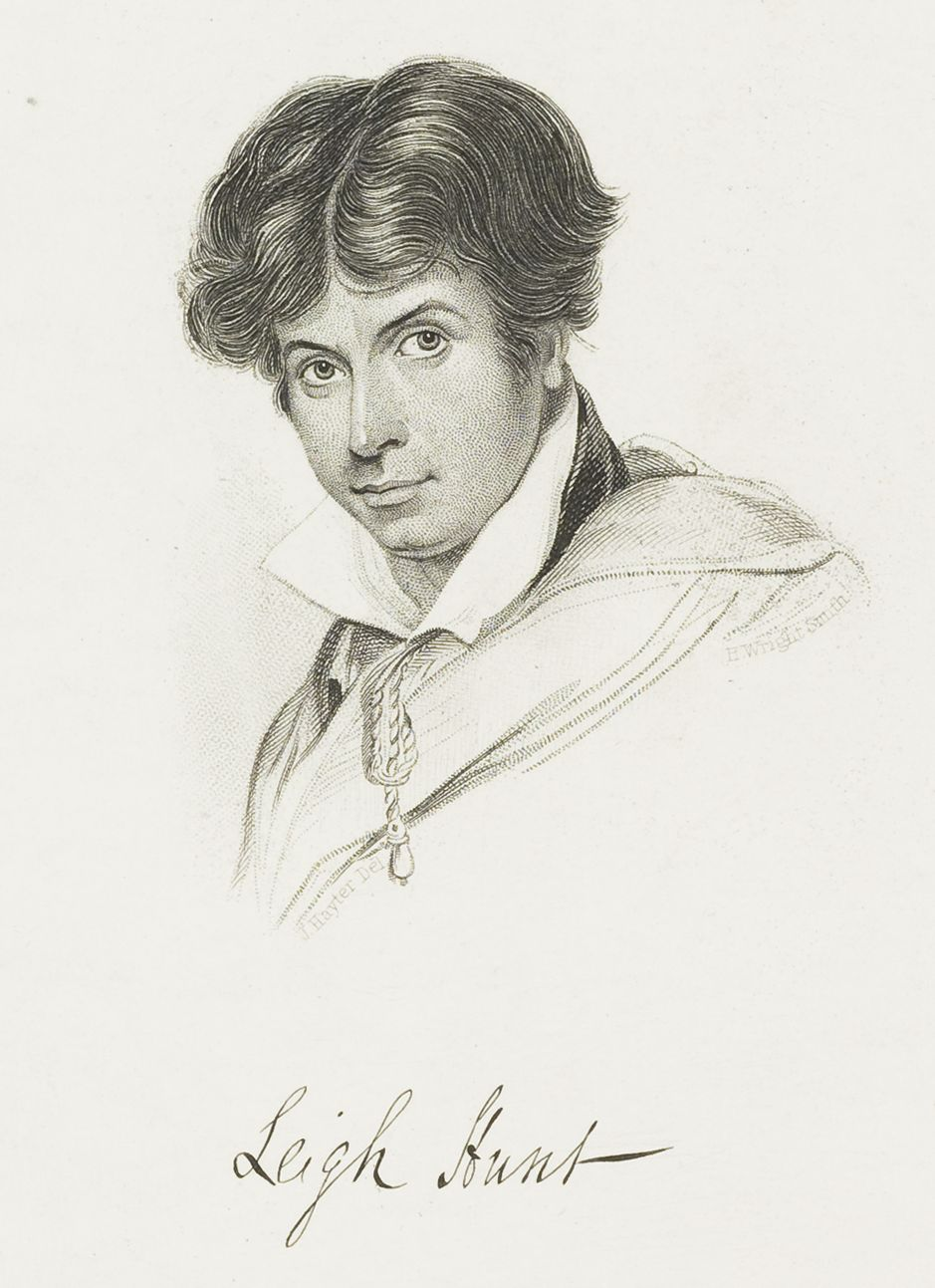
Leigh Hunt, engraved by H. Meyer from a drawing by J. Hayter

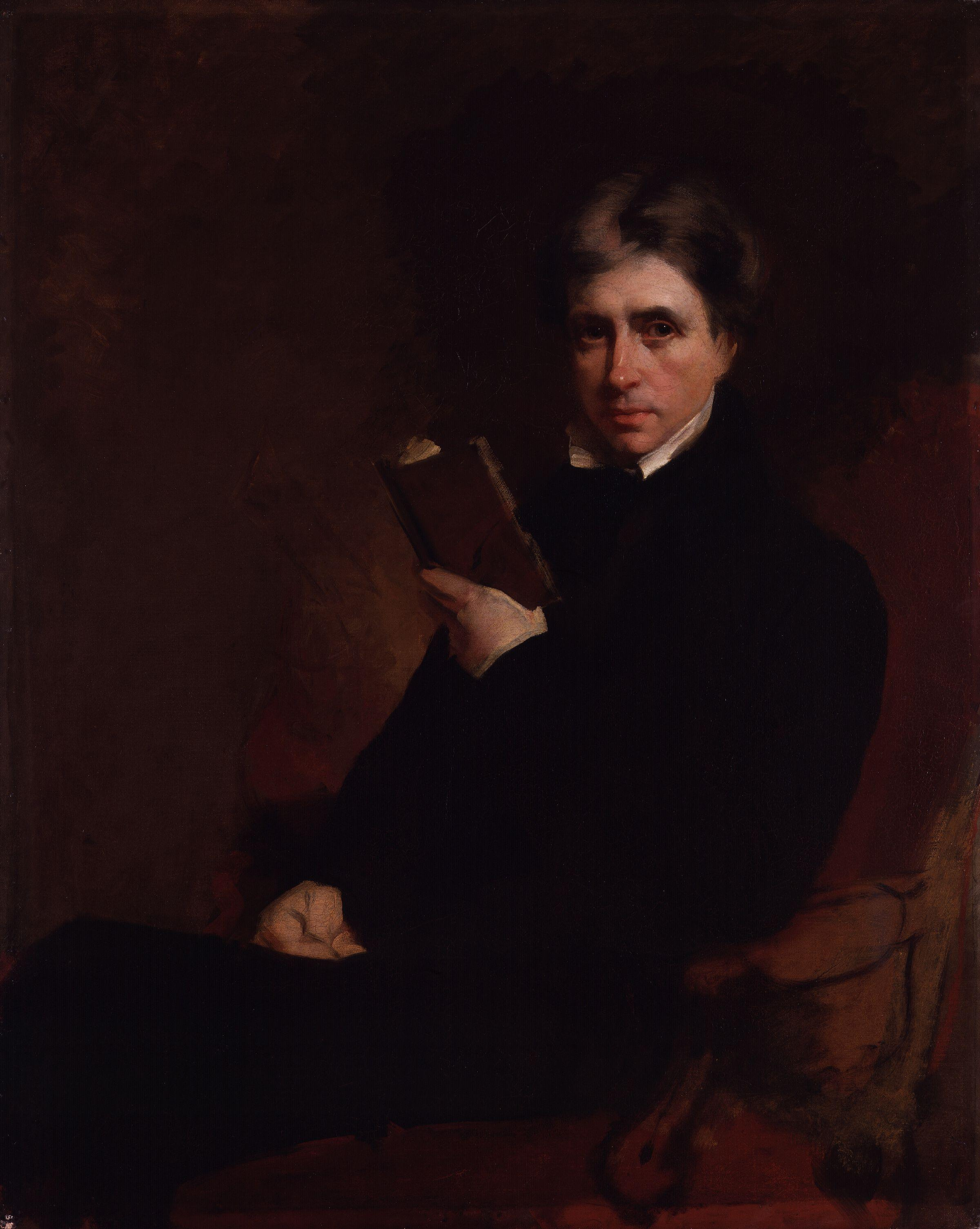
James Henry Leigh Hunt by Samuel Laurence (circa 1837)

== Education ==
Leigh Hunt was educated at Christ's Hospital in London from 1791 to 1799, a period that Hunt described in his autobiography. Thomas Barnes was a school friend. One of the boarding houses at Christ's Hospital is named after Hunt.

As a boy, Hunt was an admirer of Thomas Gray and William Collins, writing many verses in imitation of them. A speech impediment, later cured, prevented Hunt from going to university. "For some time after I left school," he says, "I did nothing but visit my school-fellows, haunt the book-stalls and write verses."

Hunt's first poems were published in 1801 under the title of Juvenilia, introducing him into British literary and theatrical society. He began to write for the newspapers and published in 1807 a volume of theatre criticism, and a series of Classic Tales with critical essays on the authors.

Hunt's early essays were published by Edward Quin, editor and owner of The Traveller.

== Family ==
In 1809, Leigh Hunt married Marianne Kent, whose parents were Thomas and Ann. Over the next 20 years, the couple had ten children: Thornton Leigh (1810–73), John Horatio Leigh (1812–46), Mary Florimel Leigh (1813–49), Swinburne Percy Leigh (1816–27), Percy Bysshe Shelley Leigh (1817–99), Henry Sylvan Leigh (1819–76), Vincent Leigh (1823–52), Julia Trelawney Leigh (1826–72), Jacyntha Leigh (1828–1914), and Arabella Leigh (1829–30).

Marianne Hunt, in poor health for most of her life, died on 26 January 1857, at the age of 69. Leigh Hunt made little mention of his family in his autobiography. Marianne's sister, Elizabeth Kent (Hunt's sister-in-law), became his amanuensis.

== Newspapers ==
=== The Examiner ===
In 1808, Hunt left the War Office, where he had been working as a clerk, to become editor of The Examiner, a newspaper founded by his brother, John Hunt. His brother Robert Hunt contributed to its columns.

Robert Hunt's criticism earned the enmity of William Blake, who described the office of The Examiner as containing a "nest of villains". Blake's response also included Leigh Hunt, who had published several vitriolic reviews in 1808 and 1809 and had added Blake's name to a list of so-called "quacks".

The Examiner soon acquired a reputation for unusual political independence; it would attack any worthy target "from a principle of taste", as John Keats expressed it. In 1813 (or 1812), The Examiner attacked Prince Regent George, describing his physique as corpulent; the British government tried the three Hunt brothers and sentenced them to two years in prison. Leigh Hunt served his term at the Surrey County Gaol, still editing The Examiner.

Leigh Hunt's visitors at Surrey County Gaol included Lord Byron, Thomas Moore, Lord Henry Brougham, and Charles Lamb. The stoicism with which Leigh Hunt bore his imprisonment attracted general attention and sympathy. His imprisonment allowed him many luxuries and access to friends and family, and Lamb described his decorations of the cell as something not found outside a fairy tale. When Jeremy Bentham called on him, he found Hunt playing battledore.

From 1814 to 1817, Leigh Hunt and Hazlitt wrote a series of essays in The Examiner that they titled "The Round Table". These essays were published in two volumes in 1817 in The Round Table. Twelve of the 52 essays were written by Hunt, the rest by Hazlitt.

=== The Reflector ===
From 1810 to 1812, Leigh Hunt edited a quarterly magazine, The Reflector, for his brother John. He wrote The Feast of the Poets for publication. His work was a satire that offended many contemporary poets, particularly William Gifford.

=== The Indicator ===
From 1819 to 1821, Hunt edited The Indicator, a weekly literary periodical that was published by Joseph Appleyard. Hunt probably wrote much of the content, which included reviews, essays, stories and poems.

=== The Companion ===
From January to July 1828, Hunt edited The Companion, a weekly literary periodical that was published by Hunt and Clarke. The journal dealt with books, theatrical productions and miscellaneous topics.

== Poetry ==
In 1816, Hunt published the poem Story of Rimini. The work was based on the tragic episode of Francesca da Rimini, as told in Dante's Inferno.

Hunt's preference was decidedly for Geoffrey Chaucer's verse style, as adapted to Modern English by John Dryden. That was in contrast to the epigrammatic couplet of Alexander Pope. The Story of Rimini is an optimistic narrative that runs contrary to the tragic nature of its subject. Hunt's flippancy and familiarity, often degenerating into the ludicrous, subsequently made him a target for ridicule and parody.

In 1818, Hunt published a collection of poems entitled Foliage, followed in 1819 by Hero and Leander, and Bacchus and Ariadne. In the same year, he reprinted The Story of Rimini and The Descent of Liberty with the title of Poetical Works. Hunt also started the Indicator.

Both Keats and Percy Bysshe Shelley belonged to a literary group that gathered around Hunt at Hampstead. The Hunt Circle also included Hazlitt, Lamb, Bryan Procter, Benjamin Haydon, Charles Cowden Clarke, C. W. Dilke, Walter Coulson and John Hamilton Reynolds. The group was known pejoratively as the Cockney School.

Some of Hunt's most popular poems are "Jenny kiss'd Me", "Abou Ben Adhem" (1834) and "A Night-Rain in Summer".

== Friendship with Keats and Shelley ==
Hunt maintained close friendships with both Keats and Shelley. Financial help from Shelley saved Hunt from ruin. In return, Hunt provided Shelley with support during his family problems and defended him in The Examiner. Hunt and his family lived with the Shelleys while Mary Shelley finished Frankenstein.

Hunt introduced Keats to Shelley and wrote a very generous appreciation of him in The Indicator. Keats seemingly, however, later felt that Hunt's example as a poet had been in some respects detrimental to him.

After Shelley's departure for Italy in 1818, Hunt experienced more financial difficulties. In addition, both his health and that of his wife Marianne failed. As a result, Hunt was forced to discontinue The Indicator (1819–1821) and stated that he had "almost died over the last numbers".

== Trip to Italy ==
Shelley suggested that Hunt could join him and Byron in Italy to establish a quarterly magazine. The advantage was that they would be able to publish liberal opinions without repression from the British government. Byron's motive for this proposal was allegedly to acquire more influence over The Examiner with Hunt out of England. However, Byron soon discovered that Hunt was no longer interested in The Examiner.

Hunt left England for Italy in November 1821, but storm, sickness, and misadventure delayed his arrival until 1 July 1822. Thomas Love Peacock compared their voyage to that of the character Ulysses in Homer's Odyssey.

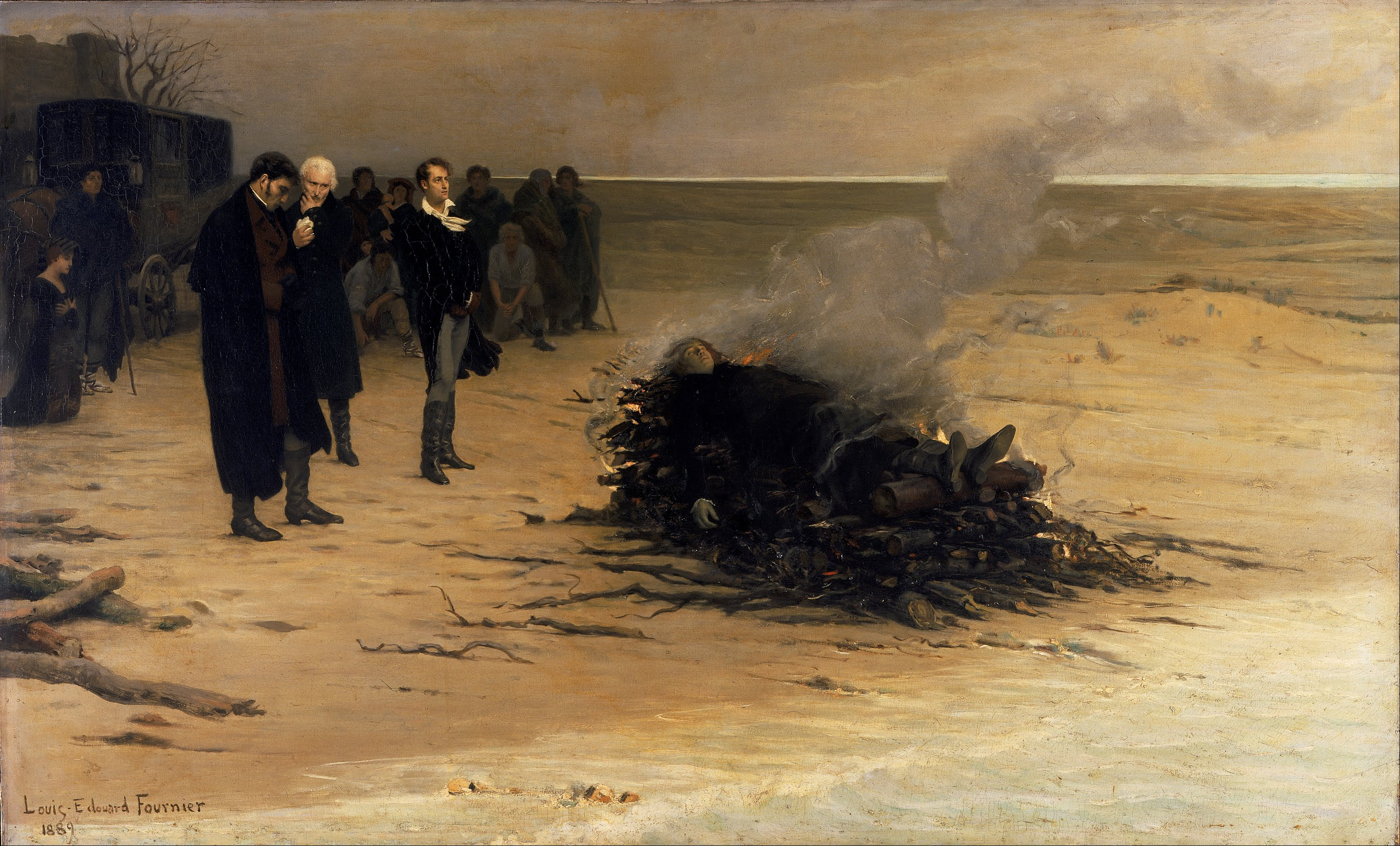
The Funeral of Shelley by Louis Édouard Fournier (1889); pictured in the centre are, from left, Trelawny, Hunt and Byron. (As a matter of fact, Hunt was not standing before the fire but remained in his coach for the entire time, though other accounts report that he took a swim in the sea.)

One week after Hunt arrived in Italy, Shelley died. Hunt was now virtually dependent upon Byron, who was not interested in supporting him and his family. Byron's friends also scorned Hunt. The Liberal lived through four quarterly numbers, containing contributions no less memorable than Byron's "Vision of Judgment" and Shelley's translations from Faust.

In 1823, Byron left Italy for Greece, abandoning the quarterly. Hunt, remaining in Genoa, enjoyed the Italian climate and culture and stayed in Italy until 1825. Meanwhile, he created Ultra-Crepidarius: a Satire on William Gifford (1823), and his translation (1825) of Francesco Redi's Bacco in Toscana.

== Return to England ==
In 1825, a lawsuit with one of his brothers made Hunt return to England. In 1828, Hunt published Lord Byron and some of his Contemporaries. The work was designed to counter what Hunt perceived as an inaccurate public image of Byron. The public was shocked that Hunt, who had been obliged to Byron for so much, would "bite the hand that fed him". Hunt especially writhed under the withering satire of Moore.

During his later years, Hunt continued to suffer from poverty and sickness. He worked unremittingly, but one effort failed after another. Two journalistic ventures, the Tatler (1830–1832), a daily devoted to literary and dramatic criticism, and London Journal (1834–1835) failed even though the latter contained some of his best writing. Hunt's editorship (1837–1838) of the Monthly Repository was also unsuccessful.

In 1832, Hunt published by subscription a collected edition of his poems. The subscribers included many of his opponents. Also in 1832, Hunt printed for private circulation Christianism, the work afterward published (1853) as The Religion of the Heart. A copy sent to Thomas Carlyle secured his friendship, and Hunt went to live next door to him in Cheyne Row in 1833.

Hunt's romance, Sir Ralph Esher, about Charles II, was successful. Captain Sword and Captain Pen, published in 1835, a spirited contrast between the victories of peace and the victories of war, deserves to be ranked among his best poems.

In 1840, Hunt's play Legend of Florence had a successful engagement at Covent Garden, which helped him financially. Lover's Amazements, a comedy, was acted several years afterwards and was printed in Journal (1850–1851); other plays remained in manuscript.

Also in 1840, Hunt wrote introductory notices to the work of Richard Brinsley Sheridan and to Edward Moxon's edition of the works of William Wycherley, William Congreve, John Vanbrugh and George Farquhar, a work that furnished the occasion of Macaulay's essay on the Dramatists of the Restoration. A narrative poem, The Palfrey, was published in 1842.

During the 1830s, Hunt also wrote for the Edinburgh Review

== Final years ==
In 1844 Mary Shelley and her son, on succeeding to the family estates, settled an annuity of £120 upon Hunt (Rossetti 1890). In 1847 Lord John Russell set up a pension of £200 for Hunt.

With his finances in better shape, Hunt published the companion books Imagination and Fancy (1844) and Wit and Humour (1846). These were two volumes of selections from English poets, which displayed his refined, discriminating critical tastes. Hunt also published a book on the pastoral poetry of Sicily, A Jar of Honey from Mount Hybla (1848). The Town (2 vols., 1848) and Men, Women and Books (2 vols., 1847) are partly made up from former material. The Old Court Suburb (2 vols., 1855; ed. A Dobson, 2002) is a sketch of Kensington, where Hunt long resided.

In 1850 Hunt published his Autobiography (3 vols.). It has been described as a naive and affected, but accurate, piece of self-portraiture. Hunt published A Book for a Corner (2 vols.) in 1849 and Table Talk appeared in 1851. In 1855, he published his narrative poems, both original and translated, under the title Stories in Verse.

Hunt died in Putney in London on 28 August 1859. He was buried at Kensal Green Cemetery. In September 1966, Christ's Hospital named one of its houses in the memory of Hunt. Today, a residential street in his birthplace of Southgate is named Leigh Hunt Drive in his honour.

== Depiction by Charles Dickens ==
In a letter of 25 September 1853, Charles Dickens stated that Hunt had inspired the character of Harold Skimpole in Bleak House; "I suppose he is the most exact portrait that was ever painted in words! ... It is an absolute reproduction of a real man". A contemporary critic commented, "I recognized Skimpole instantaneously; ... and so did every person whom I talked with about it who had ever had Leigh Hunt's acquaintance." G. K. Chesterton suggested that Dickens ”may never once have had the unfriendly thought, 'Suppose Hunt behaved like a rascal!'; he may have only had the fanciful thought, 'Suppose a rascal behaved like Hunt!'" (Chesterton 1906).

== Other works ==
- Amyntas, A Tale of the Woods (1820), a translation of Tasso's Aminta
- The Seer, or Common-Places refreshed (2 pts., 1840–1841)
- Three of the Canterbury Tales in The Poems of Geoffrey Chaucer modernized (1841)
- Stories from the Italian Poets (1846)
- Compilations such as One Hundred Romances of Real Life (1843)
- Selections from Beaumont and Fletcher (1855)
- The Book of the Sonnet (Boston, 1867), with S Adams Lee.

His Poetical Works (2 vols.), revised by himself and edited by Lee, were printed at Boston in 1857, and an edition (London and New York) by his son, Thornton Hunt, appeared in 1860. Among volumes of selections are Essays (1887), ed. A. Symons; Leigh Hunt as Poet and Essayist (1889), ed. C. Kent; Essays and Poems (1891), ed. R. B. Johnson for the "Temple Library".

Elizabeth Kent also incorporated many of his suggestions into her anonymously published Flora Domestica, Or, The Portable Flower-garden: with Directions for the Treatment of Plants in Pots and Illustrations From the Works of the Poets. London: Taylor and Hessey. 1823.

Hunt's Autobiography was revised shortly before his death, and edited (1859) by Thornton Hunt, who also arranged his Correspondence (2 vols., 1862). Additional letters were printed by the Cowden Clarkes in their Recollections of Writers (1878). The Autobiography was edited (2 vols., 1903) with full bibliographical note by Roger Ingpen.

A bibliography of Hunt's works was compiled by Alexander Ireland (List of the Writings of William Hazlitt and Leigh Hunt, 1868). There are short lives of Hunt by Cosmo Monkhouse ("Great Writers," 1893) and by RB Johnson (1896). Oxford Dictionary of National Biography Volume 28 (2004).
