= The Vision of Judgment =

1822 poem by Lord Byron

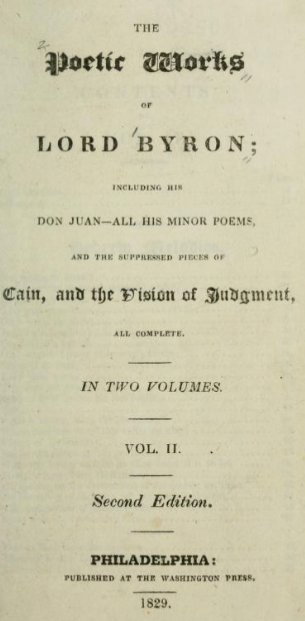
- Author: Lord Byron
- Language: English
- Genre: Satirical poem
- Publisher: John Hunt
- Publication date: 1822
- Publication place: United Kingdom
- Media type: Print (Magazine)

The Vision of Judgment (1822) is a satirical poem in ottava rima by Lord Byron, which depicts a dispute in Heaven over the fate of George III's soul. It was written in response to the Poet Laureate Robert Southey's A Vision of Judgement (1821), which had imagined the soul of king George triumphantly entering Heaven to receive his due. Byron was provoked by the High Tory point of view from which the poem was written, and he took personally Southey's preface which had attacked those "Men of diseased hearts and depraved imaginations" who had set up a "Satanic school" of poetry, "characterized by a Satanic spirit of pride and audacious impiety". He responded in the preface to his own Vision of Judgment with an attack on "The gross flattery, the dull impudence, the renegado intolerance, and impious cant, of the poem", and mischievously referred to Southey as "the author of Wat Tyler", an anti-royalist work from Southey's firebrand revolutionary youth. His parody of A Vision of Judgement was so lastingly successful that, as the critic Geoffrey Carnall wrote, "Southey's reputation has never recovered from Byron's ridicule."

== Synopsis ==
Byron's poem is set in Heaven, where the carnage of the Napoleonic Wars has placed a massive workload on the Recording Angel, though since most of the dead have been damned, St. Peter has little to do. After "a few short years of hollow peace" comes the death of George III, whom the poet describes as:

...although no tyrant, one
Who shielded tyrants, till each sense withdrawn
Left him nor mental nor external sun:
A better farmer ne'er brushed dew from lawn,
A worse king never left a realm undone!

— Stanza VIII (lines 58–62)

A cherub brings the news of the king's death to St. Peter, and George III then arrives accompanied by Lucifer, the archangel Michael and an angelic host. Lucifer claims him for Hell, portraying him as a friend of tyrants and an enemy of liberty: "He ever warr'd with freedom and the free". In support of this view, Lucifer calls John Wilkes's shade as witness, who however declines to give evidence against the king, claiming that his ministers were more to blame. The soul of the pseudonymous pamphleteer Junius is then summoned, and on being asked for his opinion of king George, replies "I loved my country, and I hated him." Lastly the demon Asmodeus produces Robert Southey himself, whom he has abducted from his earthly home. Southey gives an account of his own history, which Byron thus summarises:

He had written praises of a regicide;
He had written praises of all kings whatever;
He had written for republics far and wide,
And then against them bitterer than ever;
For pantisocracy he once had cried
Aloud, a scheme less moral than 't was clever;
Then grew a hearty anti-jacobin—
Had turn'd his coat—and would have turn'd his skin.

— Stanza XCVII (lines 769–776)

Southey then begins reading from his Vision of Judgement, but before he has got further than the first few lines the angels and devils flee in disgust, and St. Peter knocks the poet down so that he falls back to Derwent Water:

He first sank to the bottom—like his works,
But soon rose to the surface—like himself;
For all corrupted things are buoy'd like corks,
By their own rottenness[...]

— Stanza CV (lines 833–836)

George III meanwhile takes advantage of the confusion to slip into Heaven unnoticed, and begins practising the hundredth psalm.

== Publication and prosecution ==
Byron wrote The Vision of Judgment in Ravenna, Italy, beginning it on 7 May 1821 (four weeks after the publication of Southey's poem) and completing it by 4 October. It was sent in the first instance to John Murray, at that time his usual publisher, but Murray hesitated to accept such a dangerous work, and finally rejected it. Murray then passed The Vision of Judgment on to the radical publisher John Hunt, who included it in the first number of his short-lived magazine The Liberal on 15 October 1822, minus Byron's preface which Murray had neglected to send. In this edition Byron's name was not used, the poem being said to be by "Quevedo Redivivus" (Quevedo revived). Some months after publication a legal action was brought against Hunt for publishing a libel against George IV, in spite of the fact that he is not mentioned in the poem. A verdict was brought in against Hunt, and he was fined £100.

== Critical reception ==
Reviews of the poem were generally vitriolic. The Courier for 26 October 1822 described Byron as having "a brain from heaven and a heart from hell", assuring its readers that he "riots in thoughts that fiends might envy," and "seems to have lived only that the world might learn from his example how worthless and how pernicious a thing is genius, when divorced from religion, from morals, and from humanity." The Literary Gazette for 19 October 1822 held a similar opinion:

If we do not express our abhorrence of such heartless and beastly ribaldry, it is because we know no language strong enough to declare the disgust and contempt which it inspires...We deliver the judgment of Britain when we assert, that these passages are so revolting to every good feeling, there is not a gentleman in the country who will not hold their author in contempt as unworthy of the character of a gentleman.

Yet some 19th-century readers agreed with Byron's own assessment of it as "One of my best things". Goethe called it "Heavenly! Unsurpassable!", and Swinburne wrote:

A poem so short and hasty, based on a matter so worthy of brief contempt and long oblivion as the funeral and the fate of George III, bears about it at first sight no great sign or likelihood of life. But this poem which we have by us stands alone, not in Byron's work only, but in the work of the world.
