= Ida Brooks Hunt =

American singer and actress (1878–1929)

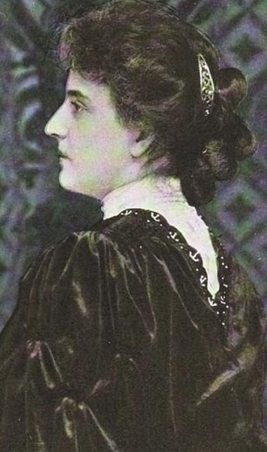
- Ida Brooks Hunt, from a 1905 publication.
- Born: Ida Grace Brooks; August 7, 1878; Panama
- Died: December 6, 1929; New York
- Occupation(s): Singer, actress

Ida Grace Brooks Hunt (August 7, 1878 – December 6, 1929) was an American singer and actress.

== Early life ==
Ida Grace Brooks was born in Panama, the daughter of an American banker father and a musical mother from Barcelona. She attended a convent school there, and St. Francis Xavier school in Brooklyn. In 1908 she spent some time studying music in Paris, in the company of fellow American singer Oriska Worden.

== Career ==
Hunt was an actress with "an unusually high soprano" voice, who starred in the musicals Woodland (1904–1905) Algeria (1908), and The Chocolate Soldier (1909–1910). In 1906, she tossed the first pitch at a New York Giants baseball game. She had a musical act in vaudeville with Alfred de Manby. During and after World War I, she entertained American troops in Europe, under the auspices of the YMCA. She spent months in French hospital recovering from health issues incurred during that work. Her last New York stage appearance was in Robin Hood, just a few weeks before she died in 1929.

== Personal life ==
In 1898, Ida Brooks married George Edwin Hunt, a dental surgeon. They lived in Indianapolis, and they divorced in 1906. He remarried in 1908. She died at her cousin's home in Brooklyn in 1929, after a stroke.
