= Kelfield, Lincolnshire =

Hamlet in North Lincolnshire, England

Coordinates: 53.501426°N 0.754701°W

Kelfield
- Location within Lincolnshire
- OS grid reference: SE826012
  - London: 140 mi (230 km) S
- Unitary authority: North Lincolnshire
- Ceremonial county: Lincolnshire
- Region: Yorkshire and the Humber
- Country: England
- Sovereign state: United Kingdom
- Post town: Doncaster
- Postcode district: DN9
- Police: Humberside
- Fire: Humberside
- Ambulance: East Midlands
- UK Parliament: Doncaster East and the Isle of Axholme

Kelfield is a hamlet in North Lincolnshire, England. It is situated on the north bank of the River Trent, and 1 mile (1.6 km) north-east from Owston Ferry and 3 miles (5 km) south-east from Epworth.

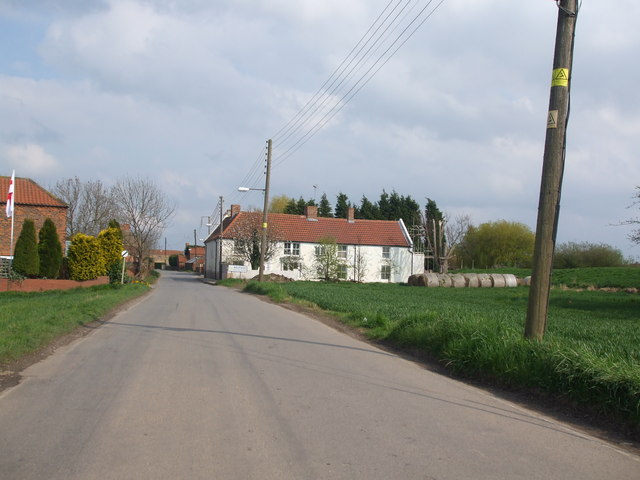
Road into Kelfield

Kelfield was once the home of the Dutch drainage engineer Cornelius Vermuyden.
