= Attorney General Hunt =

Attorney General Hunt may refer to:

- Alan Hunt (politician) (1927–2013), Attorney-General of Victoria
- George Hunt (attorney) (1841–1901), Attorney General of Illinois
- William H. Hunt (1823–1884), Attorney General of Louisiana

== See also ==
- General Hunt (disambiguation)
