= Henry Hunt =

Henry Hunt may refer to:

- Henry Hunt (cricketer) (born 1997), Australian cricketer
- Henry Hunt (politician) (1773–1835), British politician
- Henry Jackson Hunt (1819–1889), American Civil War general
- Henry Jackson Hunt (politician) (died 1826), his uncle, mayor of Detroit, Michigan
- Henry Clinton Hunt (1840–1908), American politician
- Henry Ambrose Hunt (1866–1946), British meteorologist
- Henry Thomas Hunt (1878–1956), mayor of Cincinnati, Ohio, 1912–1913
- Henry Hunt (police officer) (1918–2008), British police officer
- Henry Hunt (artist) (1923–1985), Canadian Kwakwaka'wakw artist
- Henry A. Hunt (1866–1938), African-American educator
- Henry George Bonavia Hunt (1847–1917), British Anglican cleric and the founder of the Trinity College of Music in London

== See also ==
- William Henry Hunt (disambiguation)
