= Egotistical sublime =

Phrase describing the poetry of William Wordsworth

The 'egotistical sublime' is a phrase coined by John Keats to describe the poetry of William Wordsworth in an 1818 letter to Richard Woodhouse. The phrase expresses the underlying self-centered nature of Wordsworth's poetry, particularly his use of the narrative voice to convey his own conception of a singular truth. The egotistical sublime contrasts with Keats's perception of 'negative capability' which he believed to be the ideal and exemplified by the sonnets of William Shakespeare.

== Other uses ==
English literary scholar, John Jones, titled his 1954 work on William Wordsworth The Egotistical Sublime: A History of Wordsworth's Imagination.
