= Elizabeth Kent (writer) =

British writer

Elizabeth Kent (c. 1791–1861) was a nineteenth century British writer on botanical and horticultural matters.

== Life ==
The younger sister of Marianne Kent, the future wife of Leigh Hunt, the English critic and writer, it was Bess who initially drew Hunt into the family circle through her youthful admiration for his work. Through her brother-in-law, Hunt, for whom she acted as agent and amanuensis, she belonged to a circle (the Cockney School) of contemporary writers including Byron, Coleridge, Mary Shelley, and John Clare. Her closeness to Hunt and her ambivalent position in her sister's household led to much contemporary gossip: it may be significant that it was only after her breach with the household in 1822 that Bess was able to emerge as a writer in her own right.

Kent never married.

== Works ==
Her best known work, Flora Domestica, quoting extensively from Hunt and Keats, was published anonymously in 1823, and incorrectly attributed to Henry Phillips by F. W. Burbidge in his work on Narcissus (1875). Other works include New Tales for Young Readers (1822) and Sylvan Sketches (1825). She wrote for the Magazine of Natural History, taught botany and wrote books for children.

== See also ==
- Benjamin Robert Haydon

== Bibliography ==
- "Women and Botany in 18th and Early 19th-Century England". Michigan State University Libraries.
- Hay, Daisy (2008). "Elizabeth Kent's Collaborators". Romanticism. 14 (3): 272–281. doi:10.3366/e1354991x08000378. S2CID 161980624.
- Flora Domestica, Or, The Portable Flower-garden : with Directions for the Treatment of Plants in Pots and Illustrations From the Works of the Poets. London: Taylor and Hessey. 1823.
- Sylvan Sketches, or a Companion to the Park and the Shrubbery, with Illustrations from the Works of the Poets. London, Taylor and Hessey, 1825 Archived 6 October 2014 at the Wayback Machine
- Burbidge, Frederick William (1875). The Narcissus: Its History and Culture: With Coloured Plates and Descriptions of All Known Species and Principal Varieties. London: L. Reeve & Company. (also available as pdf)
- Jeffrey N. Cox, Poetry and Politics in the Cockney School: Keats, Shelley, Hunt and their Circle. Cambridge: Cambridge University Press, 1998. ISBN 0 521 63100 9.
- Roe, Nicholas (1999). "'The Hunt Era'. Jeffrey N. Cox, Poetry and Politics in the Cockney School: Keats, Shelley, Hunt and their Circle. Cambridge: Cambridge University Press, 1998. ISBN 0 521 63100 9. Price: £40 ($59.95). The Examiner, 1818-1822. Introduced by Yasuo Deguchi, 5 vols. London: Pickering and Chatto, 1998. ISBN 1 85196 427 4. Price: £550". Romanticism on the Net (14). doi:10.7202/005854ar.
