= Roger Hunt (disambiguation) =

Roger Hunt (1938–2021) was an English footballer.

Roger Hunt may also refer to:

- Roger L. Hunt (born 1942), U.S. federal judge
- Hal and Roger Hunt, characters in Willard Price's "Adventure" series
- Roger Hunt (speaker) (died 1450s), Speaker of the House of Commons
- Ernie Hunt (born 1943), footballer born Roger Hunt, and whose clubs included Swindon Town and Coventry City
- Roger W. Hunt (1938–2018), American politician and lawyer
