= James Husey-Hunt =

English cricketer

Personal information
- Born: 20 April 1853; Somerset, England
- Died: 13 May 1924 (aged 71); Hove, Sussex, England
- Batting: Right-handed

Domestic team information
- Years: Team
- 1878-1880: Gloucestershire
- Source: Cricinfo, 1 April 2014

James Husey-Hunt (20 April 1853 – 13 May 1924) was an English cricketer. He played for Gloucestershire between 1878 and 1880.
