= Paul Hunt =

Paul Hunt may refer to:

- Paul Hunt (academic) (born 1955), British professor and Chief Commissioner of the New Zealand Human Rights Commission
- Paul Hunt (activist) (1937–1979), British disability rights activist
- Paul Hunt (footballer) (born 1970), former Forest Green Rovers player
- Paul Hunt (gymnast), American gymnastics coach
