= Lord Hunt =

Lord Hunt may refer to:

- John Hunt, Baron Hunt (1910–1998), British army officer, the leader of the 1953 British Expedition to Mount Everest
- Julian Hunt, Baron Hunt of Chesterton (born 1941), former Director General and Chief Executive of the UK Meteorological Office
- John Hunt, Baron Hunt of Fawley (1905–1987), general practitioner
- Philip Hunt, Baron Hunt of Kings Heath (born 1949), former health administrator and Labour minister
- John Hunt, Baron Hunt of Tanworth (1919–2008), British civil servant
- David Hunt, Baron Hunt of Wirral (born 1942), British Conservative politician

== See also ==
- Norman Crowther Hunt, Baron Crowther-Hunt, (1920–1987), British scholar and Labour politician
- Marquess of Huntly, a title in the Peerage of Scotland
