= Brad Hunt =

Brad Hunt may refer to:

- Brad Hunt (actor), American actor
- Brad Hunt (ice hockey) (born 1988), Canadian ice hockey player
- Brad Hunt, contestant on The Amazing Race 14
