= Bert Hunt (ice hockey) =

Canadian ice hockey player

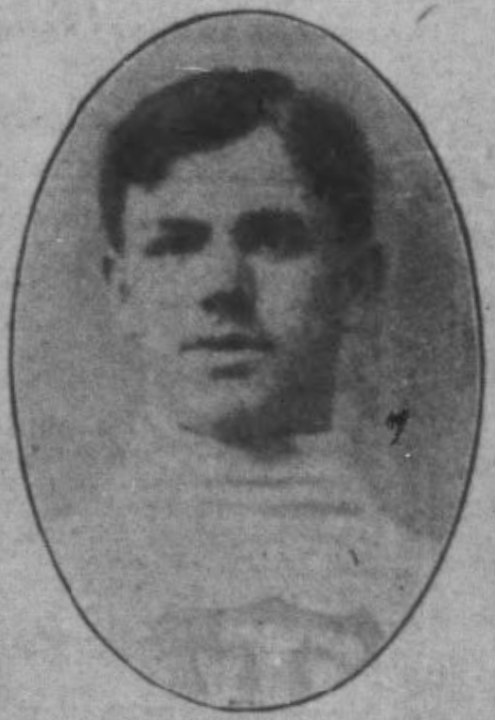
- Hunt while a member of the Kingston Frontenacs in 1910
- Born: May 18, 1891; Kingston, Ontario, Canada
- Died: July 16, 1928 (aged 37); Dayton, Ohio, United States
- Position: Defence
- Played for: Toronto Tecumsehs; Toronto Ontarios; Toronto Shamrocks; Montreal Canadiens
- Playing career: 1910–1915

Bernard Vincent Hunt (May 18, 1891 – July 16, 1928) was a Canadian professional ice hockey player. He played with the Toronto Tecumsehs, Toronto Ontarios, Toronto Shamrocks, and Montreal Canadiens of the National Hockey Association. He died after a car accident in 1928.
