= Samuel Hunt =

Samuel or Sam Hunt may refer to:

- Samuel Hunt (actor) (born 1986), American actor
- Samuel Hunt (New Hampshire politician) (1765–1807), American congressman
- Wally Hunt (Samuel Walter Hunt, 1909–1963), English footballer and cricketer
- Sam Hunt (Washington politician) (1942–2026), member of the Washington House of Representatives
- Sam Hunt (poet) (born 1946), New Zealand poet
- Sam Hunt (American football) (born 1951), American football linebacker
- Sam Hunt (Australian footballer) (born 1983), Australian rules footballer
- Sam Hunt (born 1984), American singer and songwriter
- Samuel Furman Hunt (1844–1907), American judge and legislator from Cincinnati
- R. Samuel Hunt (born 1941), American politician and businessman
- Sam Hunt (racing driver) (born 1993), American stock car racing driver and team owner
  - Sam Hunt Racing, American racing team

== See also ==
- Samantha Hunt (born 1971), American novelist
- Hunt (disambiguation)
