= Susanna Hunt =

English singer and actress

- Also known as: Geneveve
- Born: Brenchley, Kent, England
- Genre: Pop
- Occupations: Singer; actress; model
- Instrument: Vocals

Susanna Hunt (a.k.a. Susan Hunt, Sue Tacker) is an English pop singer, actress and model. She gained fame in the late 1960s and early 1970s.

== Early life ==
Hunt was born in Brenchley, Kent, England, in a farming community family, and then lived in Sedlescombe, Sussex.

She later moved to London and signed up with the Cherry Marshall Model Agency, where she learned to sing, hoping to move into acting.

== Career ==
In the 1967 documentary of the atmosphere in London of the time, Tonite Let's All Make Love in London, appeared as a dolly girl describing the archetype, and "the scene", sitting in a circulating fairground ride on a summer's day.

She was an original member of the cast of Peter Coe's Decameron '73, which made an impact in 1973 in the UK for its free expression of nude form.

Her major contribution to theatre was her three years in Let My People Come. The production was nominated for a Grammy Award in 1975 for Best Original Cast Album.

== Film ==
- Casino Royale (1967) - Hunt played one of the "Bond Girls" in a short sequence where she tries to seduce agent Terence Cooper who is training to resist the temptation of women counter agents from "SMERSH". She appears as "Lorely", wearing a white bikini and walks up to and gives agent Terrance a sultry kiss to test his reaction. He responds that he is trained to resist her charm and then judo tackles her to the ground.
- The Looking Glass War (1970) - she plays a short scene in a cafe, with a girlfriend, where the lead character Leise indicates his interest in passing some time with them. His controller, Haldane, quietly counsels, "There'll be no time for that, I'm afraid."
- British TV series, Special Branch (1974), featured her in a couple of episodes where she had a small part as Craven's secretary.
- She played in the British TV series Hugh and I.

== Musical career ==
Hunt was a pop singer known under the stage name of Geneveve, in 1966 releasing the songs, "Just a Whisper", "Summer Days", "Nothing in the World", and "Once", plus in 1967, "That Can't Be Bad" and "I Love Him, I Need Him".

Her songs got airplay on English radio stations, as well as pirate stations Radio London (three times in the Fab 40) and Radio 270.

== Personal life ==
She married musician Ronnie Lane, and was a part of The Faces musical entourage.

She appeared in the 2006 documentary film, The Passing Show, where she speaks about Lane and The Faces. She resides in Walnut Creek, California, United States.
