= John Hunt (publisher) =

American-born English printer and publisher (1775-1848)

John Hunt (1775 – 7 September 1848) was an American-born English printer, publisher, and occasional political writer. He co-founded The Examiner with his brother Leigh Hunt.

== Early life, family and education ==
Hunt was born in Philadelphia, Pennsylvania, the fourth of eight children (five of whom survived to adulthood) born to Isaac Hunt and Mary Hunt. He was taken to London in or about 1777. He was an elder brother of the poet and essayist Leigh Hunt and a brother of the critic Robert Hunt.

== Career ==
On 1 February 1791 he was apprenticed to the printer Henry Reynell. Known as a staunch, outspoken, and uncompromising radical, Hunt was more than once imprisoned for his publication of items that were considered libelous, even seditious.

John Hunt was responsible for various periodicals over the years, all of them politically left-leaning. His first publishing venture, in 1805 (after a failed beginning the year before), was the eight-page weekly newspaper The News. This was followed by The Reflector, the Yellow Dwarf, The Liberal, and, the most famous and influential, The Examiner, edited by his brother Leigh Hunt.

He was also known for publishing radical or controversial works no one else would touch. Among the miscellany, including one book by Jeremy Bentham, there were others more obviously incendiary or scandalous, such as some of Byron's later works, including The Vision of Judgment, Hazlitt's Liber Amoris, and writings of both Percy and Mary Shelley. He published Shelley's Posthumous Poems in 1824.

== Personal life and demise ==
Hunt and his wife Sarah Hoole "Sally" (née Hammond), whom he had married in 1797, had at least two sons, one of whom, Henry Leigh Hunt, eventually took over many publishing and editing responsibilities from his father.

Hunt was closely attached to, and a frequent collaborator with, his younger brother Leigh. However, between 1825 and 1840, the brothers were not on speaking terms because of, as they later agreed, a misunderstanding over financial matters.

John Hunt spent his last decades retired to Upper Cheddon near Taunton, Somerset. After many years in poor health, he died in Brompton, Middlesex, on 7 September 1848.
