= Ken Hunt =

Ken Hunt may refer to:

- Ken Hunt (outfielder) (1934–1997), Major League Baseball outfielder (1959–1964)
- Ken Hunt (pitcher) (1938–2008), Major League Baseball pitcher (1961)
- Ken Hunt (music journalist) born 1951, English music critic, journalist, broadcaster and translator
- Kenneth Hunt (footballer) (1884–1949), English Olympic footballer
- Kenneth Hunt (cricketer) (1902–1971), English cricketer
- Kenneth H. Hunt (1920–2002), Australian professor of kinematics
