= John Hunt (oceanographer) =

American geologist, chemist, and oceanographer

John M. Hunt (1 December 1918 – 23 July 2005) was a geologist, chemist, and oceanographer. He worked at the Woods Hole Oceanographic Institution beginning in 1968. His specialty was petroleum geochemistry, and he wrote the standard textbook Petroleum Geochemistry and Geology.
