= George R. Hunt =

English cricketer

George Hunt
Personal information
- Full name: George Rupert Hunt
- Born: 23 March 1873; Bathwick, Somerset
- Died: 22 August 1960 (aged 87); Old Bursledon, Hampshire
- Batting: Right-handed
- Bowling: Right-arm medium

Domestic team information
- Years: Team
- 1898: Somerset

Career statistics
Competition	First-class
Matches	1
Runs scored	4
Batting average	2.00
100s/50s	0/0
Top score	3
Catches/stumpings	1/–
- Source: ESPNcricinfo, 21 September 2017

George Rupert Hunt (23 March 1873 – 22 August 1960) was an English cricketer. He was a right-handed batsman and right-arm medium-pace bowler who played for Somerset. He was born in Bathwick and died in Old Bursledon, Hampshire.

Hunt made a single first-class appearance for the team, during the 1898 season, against Surrey. Somerset were short of players for the match, and recruited Hunt, who had played cricket while at the University of Oxford, though never for their first team. From the middle order, he scored a single run in the first innings in which he batted, and, upon being moved to the opening order in the second innings, scored three runs. The Somerset cricket historian Stephen Hill speculated that Hunt might have been promoted to open in the second innings as the captain was "aware that the new man was unlikely ever to have another opportunity to experience county cricket."
