= Jamie Hunt =

Jamie Hunt may refer to:

- Jamie Hunt (ice hockey) (born 1984), Canadian ice hockey defenceman
- Jamie Hunt (sailor) (born 1979), New Zealand sailor

== See also ==
- James Hunt (disambiguation)
