= Albert Hunt =

Albert Hunt may refer to:

- Albert Cameron Hunt, American inventor
- Albert C. Hunt (1888–1956), American jurist
- Al Hunt (born 1942), American journalist
- Prince Albert Hunt, American country blues fiddle player

== See also ==
- Alfred Hunt (disambiguation)
