= John Hunt (cricketer) =

English cricketer

John Henry Sneyd Hunt (24 November 1874 – 16 September 1916) was an English first-class cricketer active 1902–12 who played for Middlesex. He was born in Kensington; died in Ginchy, Somme.
