= General Hunt =

General Hunt may refer to:

- Henry Jackson Hunt (1819–1889), Chief of Artillery in the Army of the Potomac during the American Civil War
- Ira A. Hunt Jr. (1924–2022), U.S. Army major general
- LeRoy P. Hunt (1892–1968), U.S. Marine Corps general
- Lewis Cass Hunt (1824–1886), Union Army brigadier general
- Malcolm Hunt (born 1938), Royal Marines major general
- Peter Hunt (British Army officer) (1916–1988), British Army general
- Theodore Gaillard Hunt (1805–1893), Louisiana Militia brigadier general

== See also ==
- Gustav Hundt (1894–1945), German Wehrmacht lieutenant general
- Attorney General Hunt (disambiguation)
