= Ralph Hunt =

Ralph Hunt may refer to:

- Ralph Hunt (MP) (died c.1432), MP for Bath
- Ralph Hunt (colonist) (born 1613), founding colonist of what is today Long Island
- Ralph Hunt (Australian politician) (1928–2011), Australian politician
- Ralph Hunt (footballer) (1933–1964), English footballer
