= Una Hunt =

American writer (1876–1957)

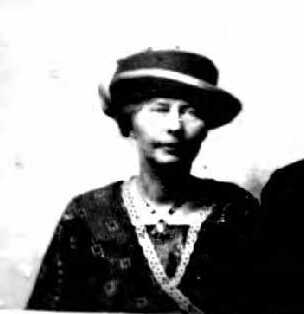
- Born: January 6, 1876; Cincinnati
- Died: November 10, 1957 (aged 81); Montreux
- Occupation: Artist
- Parent(s): Frank Wigglesworth Clarke

Una Hunt Clarke Drage (January 6, 1876 – November 10, 1957) was an American author famed in her time for publishing Una Mary, an autobiographical reconstruction of the inner and outer world of her childhood. G. Stanley Hall, generally credited with discovering the concept of adolescence, considered her along with Marie Bashkirtseff and Mary MacLane to have exposed the world of female adolescent thought and emotion. She was the daughter of prominent geologist Frank Wigglesworth Clarke (1847–1931).

== Works ==
- Una Mary: The Inner Life of a Child. New York: Charles Scribner's Sons, 1914.
- Young in the "Nineties", New York: Charles Scribner's Sons, 1927.

== Sources ==
- Some of G. Stanley Hall's words (1914) about Una Mary.
- Hall refers to book in 1922 in highest terms.
