= Peter Hunt =

Peter Hunt may refer to:

- Peter Hunt (British Army officer) (1916–1988), Chief of the General Staff of the British Army
- Peter H. Hunt (1938–2020), American film, television and stage director
- Peter R. Hunt (1925–2002), film editor on many early James Bond films and director of On Her Majesty's Secret Service
- Peter Hunt (literary critic) (born 1945), scholar of children's literature
- Peter Hunt (politician) (born 1966), General Secretary of the British political party, the Co-operative Party
- Peter Hunt (darts player) (born 1965), darts player from New Zealand
- Peter Hunt (footballer) (born 1952), English footballer
- Peter Hunt (folk artist) (1896–1967), American folk artist
- Peter John Hunt (1933–1997), British businessman
