= Stephen Hunt =

Stephen Hunt or Steven Hunt may refer to:

== Football ==
- Stephen Hunt (footballer, born 1981), Republic of Ireland footballer
- Stephen Hunt (footballer, born 1984), English footballer
- Steve Hunt (footballer, born 1956), England, Coventry, Aston Villa and West Bromwich Albion footballer
- Steven Hunt (rugby union) (born 1988), South African rugby sevens player

== Other people ==
- Stephen Hunt (born 1981), Australian actor famous for playing Matt Hancock in Australian soap opera Neighbours
- Stephen Hunt (author) (born 1966), British author
- Stephen J. Hunt, British sociologist
- Steve Hunt (born 1958), American jazz pianist
- Steven Hunt, a.k.a. Mista Stixx and DJ Stix, 1980s-90s hip hop artist who collaborated on a track with Yinka Charles in 2013
