= David Hunt (footballer, born 1980) =

English footballer

Personal information
- Full name: David Hunt
- Date of birth: 5 March 1980
- Place of birth: Durham, England
- Height: 5 ft 10 in (1.78 m)
- Position: Full back

Youth career
- –: Darlington

Senior career*
Years	Team	Apps	(Gls)
1997–2000	Darlington	1	(0)
2000–20??	Durham City		
- * Club domestic league appearances and goals

David Hunt (born 5 March 1980) is an English former footballer who played as a full back in the Football League for Darlington and in non-league football for Durham City.

Hunt was born in Durham. He made his Darlington debut as a 16-year-old, on 22 February 1997, as a very late substitute in a 3–2 defeat away to Exeter City in Division Three, and remained with the club for a further three years without playing for the first team again. He spent the 2000–01 season with Northern League club Durham City, but his time there was disrupted by injury.
