= Marvin W. Hunt =

American Renaissance historian

- Occupations: Renaissance historian, author, and academic

Academic background
- Education: B.A. in English and Psychology; M.A. in English; PhD in Renaissance/Eighteenth Century
- Alma mater: East Carolina University; University of North Carolina at Chapel Hill
- Thesis: The Semiology of Character in Sir Philip Sidney’s Fiction (1987)
- Doctoral advisor: S. K. Heninger Jr.

Academic work
- Institutions: North Carolina State University
- Website: https://www.marvinhunt.com/

Marvin W. Hunt is an American Renaissance historian, author, and academic. He is a professor emeritus in the College of Humanities and Social Sciences at the North Carolina State University.

His travel stories have been published in The New York Times, The Washington Post, The Atlanta Journal-Constitution, and The North Carolina Literary Review. In addition, he is the author of two books Looking for Hamlet, which received a starred Kirkus review and Among the Children of the Sun: Travels in the Family Islands of the Bahamas. Hunt serves on the board of advisors of the Rasmussen-Hines Rare Book and Manuscript Collection.

== Education ==
Hunt obtained his Baccalaureate degree in English and Psychology from East Carolina University in 1973, and went on to earn a master's degree in English from the same university in 1976. His master's thesis was entitled "Ignatius his Conclave: John Donne’s Anatomy of the World". In 1987, he completed his Ph.D. in Renaissance and Eighteenth Century studies, with a thesis titled "The Semiology of Character in Sir Philip Sidney's Fiction," under the direction of S. K. Heninger Jr.

== Career ==
Following his master's, Hunt began his academic career as a Teaching Assistant at the University of North Carolina at Chapel Hill in 1980 and was appointed as a Lecturer there in 1985. After the completion of his Ph.D., he held brief appointments as assistant professor at East Carolina University, Elan College, and Campbell University. In 1993, he started working as a Senior Lecturer in the Department of English at North Carolina State University where he taught until 2018. Since, he has been serving as Professor Emeritus in the College of Humanities and Social Sciences.

=== Research and scholarly works ===
Hunt’s scholarship spans Shakespearean criticism, Renaissance semiotics, Sidney studies, textual theory, and literary-cultural travel writing. His work is characterized by structuralist analysis, historical contextualization, and a focus on how linguistic absence and interpretive participation generate meaning. Though best known for his studies of Hamlet, Hunt’s scholarship extends across Renaissance literary criticism and interdisciplinary cultural inquiry.

Hunt's investigation of the English Renaissance began with a concentration on Sir Philip Sidney's literary practices and personal life. In his research, he presented the idea that Sidney's narratology can be analyzed through Saussurian linguistics, emphasizing the significance of character placement within the plot. Shifting his focus to the works of Shakespeare in the early 1990s, he examined various aspects of the playwright's writings through conferences and publications. Among his notable contributions is the book, Looking for Hamlet, in which he presents the concept that Hamlet could be understood as a metaphorical missing person, who could only be discovered and understood through a process of self-identification. The work received praise for its accessible nature, as noted by Frank Nicholas Clary in his review, where he observed, "Beyond its title, there are early indications that this book has been designed for… diverse audience[s]," both popular and scholarly.

Looking for Hamlet also received a starred review from Kirkus Reviews and was listed among the top ten bestselling academic titles of 2008, further establishing his reputation as a significant contributor to contemporary Shakespeare scholarship.

He expanded this work in Consorting with Catholics: Sir Philip Sidney and The Prayers of All Good Men, which examined Sidney’s negotiation of confessional politics in Elizabethan England, and in Charactonymic Structures in Sidney’s Arcadias, a study of naming systems as structural devices shaping meaning in Sidney’s Arcadia.

Outside academic criticism, Hunt authored Among the Children of the Sun, a literary travel work on the Bahamian Family Islands combining memoir, history, environmental reflection, and cultural analysis. The book reflects the same interpretive depth found in his scholarly criticism.

=== Travel ===
Hunt's research include a secondary focus on travel writing. He has contributed articles and a book based on his travel experiences. One of his articles recounted his time in Eleuthera, Bahamas, published in the Atlanta Journal-Constitution, while another publication featured an opinionated guide to the Bahamas in The Washington Post. He photographed the beauty of flamingos as well in an article titled, “Counting Flamingos of Great Inagua” for The New York Times. Furthermore, he explored the geology, social, and cultural history of the Family Islands of the Bahamas in his book, Among the Children of the Sun: Travels in the Family Islands of the Bahamas, shedding light on the real lives and challenges of the island's inhabitants. The New York Times also published his piece "A Hidden Treasure No Longer" in 2001, which revealed insights into life on Ocracoke Island, North Carolina.

== Bibliography ==
=== Selected books ===
- Hunt, Marvin W. (2007). Looking for Hamlet. St. Martin's Press. ISBN 978-1-4039-7036-7.
- Hunt, Marvin (2012). Among the Children of the Sun: Travels In the Family Islands of the Bahamas. CreateSpace Independent Publishing Platform. ISBN 978-1-4800-8549-7.

=== Selected articles ===
- Hunt, Marvin (1992). "Consorting With Catholics: Sir Philip Sidney and 'The Prayers of All Good Men'". Sidney Newsletter & Journal. 12 (1): 21–28. ProQuest 1838456060.
- Hunt, Marvin (1993). "Charactonymic Structures in Sidney's Arcadias". Studies in English Literature, 1500-1900. 33 (1): 1–19. doi:10.2307/450843. JSTOR 450843. ProQuest 1297428374.
- Hunt, M. (1994). "'That's the Word!' Turning Tongues and Heads in 'Bartleby the Scrivener'". ESQ-A Journal of American Renaissance. 40 (4): 275–292.
- Hunt, Marvin (2000). "Be Dark but Not Too Dark: Shakespeare's Dark Lady as a Sign of Color". In Schiffer, James (ed.). Shakespeare's Sonnets: Critical Essays. Routledge. pp. 369–390. doi:10.4324/9780203707371. ISBN 978-0-203-70737-1.
