= Bert Hunt =

English cricketer

Personal information
- Full name: Hubert Hunt
- Born: 18 November 1911; Long Ashton, Somerset, England
- Died: 29 November 1985 (aged 74); Pill, Somerset, England
- Batting: Right-handed
- Bowling: Right-arm off-break

Domestic team information
- Years: Team
- 1936: Somerset

Career statistics
Competition	FC
Matches	11
Runs scored	100
Batting average	7.69
100s/50s	0/0
Top score	22
Balls bowled	572
Wickets	15
Bowling average	19.00
5 wickets in innings	1
10 wickets in match	0
Best bowling	7/49
Catches/stumpings	2/–
- Source: CricketArchive, 22 December 2015

Hubert Hunt, born at Long Ashton, Somerset, England, on 18 November 1911, and died at Pill, Somerset on 29 November 1985, played in 11 first-class cricket matches for Somerset in the 1936 season.

The brother of George Hunt who played 233 matches for Somerset as a professional between 1921 and 1931, Bert Hunt was a lower-order right-handed batsman and a right-arm off-spin bowler. He played fairly regularly for two months from the end of May to the end of July 1936 as the second spin bowler (after Horace Hazell) in the Somerset side, but in that period he bowled fewer than 100 first-class overs. But he had his moments. Against Derbyshire at Ilkeston, he took seven for 49 in the first innings and was then not called upon to bowl at all in the second innings as Somerset beat the 1936 County Champions by an innings. A week later, he was among the Somerset batsmen who hit Hedley Verity of Yorkshire and England for 89 runs from nine overs, contributing two sixes in an innings of 22 that was surpassed by Hazell, who hit Verity for four sixes in a single over. But at the end of the season, he left the Somerset staff and he never played first-class cricket again.

David Foot, the historian of Somerset cricket, wrote of Hunt that he had "a healthy cynicism about the life of an expendable professional cricketer" and that he "preferred to stick to his weekend matches for his village team, Lodway". Foot added: "His pals in the parish used to say of him: 'He had the most perfect temperament we ever came across – the bowler who never complained. We could put down five catches off him, as we did more than once, and he merely smiled'."

After leaving first-class cricket, Hunt played Minor Counties cricket for Cornwall in 1939 and 1948, when he took 23 wickets at an average of 17 apiece. He was an umpire in Minor Counties matches in 1950.
