= Jim Hunt (coach) =

American athletics coach (died 2019)

- Died: September 2019
- Known for: Coaching Long Distance, Cross Country, Track and Field

Jim Hunt was the renowned former head cross-country and track and field coach at Humboldt State University, where he coached Lumberjack teams from 1965 until 1986. His cross-country team won the 1980 NCAA Division II National Championships and his teams regularly finished in the top ten at NCAA Nationals, producing 64 All-Americans and eleven National Champions. He coached numerous Humboldt State distance greats including Gary Tuttle, Bill Scobey, Danny Grimes, Chuck Smead and 1988 US Olympic marathon trials winner Mark Conover, his most accomplished protégé. Hunt was hired as the head track & field and cross country coach at the University of California, Davis from 1986 to 1993. He guided the UC Davis women's cross country program to a runner-up finish at the 1991 NCAA Division II cross country championships with four All-Americans, among three other top-10 team finishes. The men's cross country program finished fourth that same season with two All-Americans. Hunt became well respected nationally as a coach and innovator of new training methods. He produced a video "Training the Neurological Aspects of Distance Running" used by coaches across the United States. In 2018, Hunt published "The Rhythm of Running".

== Education ==
Hunt graduated from Wayne State University in Michigan in 1949. He later earned his master's degree from Chico State University.

== Career ==
Hunt coached at Cal Poly Humboldt from 1966 until 1986. During his tenure there, his teams were the runner up to the Division III Cross Country title three times in four years, 1976-7 and 1979. Humboldt moved to Division II in 1980 and in their first year in the division, they won the National Championship.

He coached the UC Davis Aggie cross country program from 1989 to 1992, taking the women's team to the runner up position in 1991. He left UC Davis to coach the track and cross country programs at nearby Sierra College in Rocklin, California from 1993 to 2000, before returning to UC Davis, where he became an assistant coach until his retirement in 2003. Hunt has also served as the USA Track & Field Men's Development distance and middle-distance coach from 1981 to 1992. He was a coach at the US West Team Sports Festival in 1981. He also served as the international director of distance running and race walking for Special Olympics International. In July 2000, Hunt served as the coordinator of the Masters, Disabled and Special Olympic Events at the Olympic Track and Field Trials in Sacramento, California.

Current Cal Poly Humboldt Lumberjack coach Jamey Harris, reflecting upon his predecessor, has stated, "I was never coached by Jim Hunt, but he always had supportive words for me when I was an athlete and later when I began coaching at Cal Poly Humboldt. I feel a responsibility, an obligation to uphold or at least aspire to the level of excellence and caring that he set for decades. That's the best way I think I can pay tribute to the man."

Hunt was inducted into the Cal Poly Humboldt Hall of Fame in 1993. He was inducted into the USTFCCCA (United States Track and Field and Cross Country Coaches Association) Hall of Fame in 2013.

== Running videos ==
Along with two Cal Poly Humboldt cinema students (Dean Munroe and David Phillips), Coach Hunt co-produced "The Harriers", an award-winning 25-minute black and white film at Cal Poly Humboldt in 1968. The film featured some of Cal Poly Humboldt's best cross country athletes, including Gary Tuttle. The picture created an impressionistic view of cross country in a variety of settings including a lone runner jogging through a herd of elk, the team disappearing into the fog of a giant redwood forest, and sprinters at Clam Beach (determining Cal Poly Humboldt's seventh man for the nationals). Set to music without narration, the film was used frequently by Hunt to motivate and encourage runners at his training camps.

Produced in 2000, "Training the Neurological Aspects" is a 19-minute instructional video hosted by Hunt. The video covers neurological training techniques that focus on training to run faster without injury.
