= John Hunt (Michigan judge) =

American judge

John Hunt (? – June 15, 1827) was an American jurist.

Hunt was appointed to the Michigan Territorial Supreme Court on February 20, 1824, by President James Monroe and died in office on June 15, 1827.
