= John Hunt (died c. 1615) =

Sir John Hunt (c. 1550 – 1615) was an English gentleman from Rutland.

== Life ==
Hunt was the second son of John Hunt of Lyndon, Rutland; his mother was Amy, daughter of Sir Thomas Cave of Stanford, Northamptonshire. He was born at Morcott in Rutland, was sent to Eton College, and then to King's College, Cambridge, where he was admitted a scholar 27 August 1565. He left the university without taking a degree.

In the parliament which met 2 April 1571 a man of this name sat as member for Sudbury. If this is the same John Hunt, then he may have benefitted from the influence of a relation of his mother, Sir Ambrose Cave, Chancellor of the Duchy of Lancaster. The History of Parliament does not link the Sudbury MP to any other identifiable person of the name, and the ODNB notes that he "may have been the same man", but there is no clear evidence for a link.

Of the total of £375 raised for the Queen's government by the landed gentry of Rutland in 1589, the most important proprietor, Sir John Harington, gave £100. Hunt gave £25, an indicator of real wealth. Hunt settled during the latter part of his life at Newton Burdett, Leicestershire which he inherited from his father.

A man of some ability and attainments, he has been claimed to have led a somewhat profligate life. However, he was not the John Hunt, son of Henry Hunt and of Jane, the daughter of Aubrey deVere (son of the 15th Earl of Oxford, John de Vere) who in 1611 was accused by Elizabeth, dowager Countess of Oxford, of corrupting her young son Henry de Vere, 18th Earl of Oxford.

In the same year, 10 November, Hunt was knighted at Whitehall by James I. A nephew, William Le Hunt of Gray's Inn, was called to the degree of Serjeant of law in Trinity term 1688.

== Works ==
- Latin epigrams in collection presented by the scholars of Eton to Queen Elizabeth at Windsor Castle, 1563.
- Latin verses in commendation of Anne, countess of Oxford, 1588, Lansdowne MS. civ. art. 78.
