= John Hunt (Quaker minister) =

Prominent Quaker minister and journalist from Moorestown, New Jersey

- Born: August 5, 1740; Burlington County, New Jersey
- Died: September 21, 1824 (aged 84); Burlington County, New Jersey
- Spouse: Esther Warrington
- Children: William, b: July 29, 1763; Samuel, b: January 27, 1765; Joseph, b: February 8, 1768; Abigail, b: October 6, 1770; Rachel, b: August 21, 1773; William, b: January 11, 1776; John, b: May 26, 1778; Benjamin, b: November 19, 1780; Esther, b: January 30, 1783; Hannah, b: May 4, 1785
- Parent(s): Robert Hunt, Jr. Abigail Wood

John Hunt was a prominent Quaker minister and journalist from Moorestown, New Jersey. He kept a diary, most of which has been preserved, from 1770 to 1824. The diary relates Hunt's personal activities, concerns and beliefs. It is also a concise source of primary evidence that documents local people and events.

John Hunt, the son of Robert Hunt, Jr. (April 21, 1709 – February 29, 1764) and Abigail Wood (c. 1715 – February 22, 1747), his wife, was born August 5, 1740, at the small, rural community of Mount Pleasant. Mount Pleasant is located in Mansfield Township, Burlington County, New Jersey about two miles east of the town of Columbus. His father was a first cousin to John Woolman, the renowned Quaker minister. The family moved to a farm at Colestown, a small community located three miles south of Moorestown. Here, Abigail Hunt died February 22, 1747. Robert Hunt and Martha Bates (c. 1725 – 1770), widow of George Ward, were married in May 1749. Robert Hunt's seven children, from both marriages, lived together on the farm at Colestown.

John Hunt and Esther Warrington were married March 17, 1763, in the Friends Meetinghouse at Moorestown. They had ten children, three of whom died young. Hunt was a Quaker minister for more than 50 years.

John Hunt died September 21, 1824, and was buried in the Moorestown Friends burial ground.

His memorial, published in 1842, highlighted his public testimony concerning pride and superfluity, and stated that he was particularly concerned with temperance.

== Bibliography ==
- Gummere, Amelia Mott (1922). The journal and essays of John Woolman. New York: The Macmillan Company.
- Hart, Craig (2004). "Lou Hoover", A genealogy of the wives of the American presidents and their first two generations of descent. North Carolina, Jefferson: McFarland & Co., Inc. pp. 129–133.
- Hunt Family Papers, Friends Historical Library of Swarthmore College, Swarthmore, Pennsylvania.
- Hunt, John (1770–1824). John Hunt's journal. RG 5/240, Friends Historical Library of Swarthmore College, Swarthmore, Pennsylvania 19081-1399.
- Hynes, Judy, et al. (1997). The descendants of John and Elizabeth (Woolman) Borton. Mount Holly, New Jersey: John Woolman Memorial Association.
- Memorials concerning deceased Friends (1842). Philadelphia: S. B. Chapman & Co., pp. 12–16.
- Lamborn, Suzanne Parry (2006). John and Sarah Roberts, with many related families. Morgantown, Pennsylvania: Masthof Press, ISBN 1-932864-58-X.
- Matlack, Asa. Letterbooks of Asa Matlack. Genealogical Society of Pennsylvania, Philadelphia, Pennsylvania.
- Woodward, E. M. (1883). History of Burlington County, New Jersey, with biographical sketches of many of its pioneers and prominent men. Philadelphia: Everts & Peck. pp. 270–271.
