= Justin Hunt (filmmaker) =

American documentary filmmaker

Justin Travis Hunt (born September 16, 1976) is an American documentary filmmaker whose films include American Meth (2007), Absent (2010), and The Speed of Orange (2012).

== Early life ==
He was born in Grand Junction, Colorado, where his father, Glen Hunt, was a jockey, and his mother, Linda, was a race horse trainer. Hunt was a television news anchor and reporter, primarily in New Mexico, in the late '90s and early 2000s. In 2003, he left a successful career in broadcasting to begin his production company, Time & Tide Productions, Inc.

== Filmmaking ==
Since 2003, Time & Tide Productions has turned out hundreds of video projects, most notably James & Erniefied (2004), a documentary-style production of Navajo comedians James Junes and Ernest Tsosie III, The Meth Monster (2004), American Meth (2007), Absent (2010), and The Speed of Orange (2012).

Hunt also founded the American Meth Education Foundation.

== American Meth ==
His first feature was American Meth (2007). This documentary narrated by Val Kilmer looked at the effects of the drug methamphetamine on American culture and on an American family. The film was picked up for distribution by Rivercoast Film Distribution. Sound on Sight found it shocking but educational. Hunt toured the film, including free screenings for high school students.

It won the 2011 CPDD/NIDA Media Award from the College on Problems of Drug Dependence, Best Documentary at the Cinema City International Film Festival at Universal Studios and the TriMedia Film Festival (2007) and the Most Socially Engaging Film at the Eugene International Film Festival (2007).

== Absent ==
Absent (2012) focused on what it was like for children growing up with an absent father. The film includes musician James Hetfield talking about his experiences growing up. The film also features boxer Johnny Tapia and Christian authors John Eldredge and Richard Rohr.

== The Speed of Orange ==
His next film was about his parents' career in horse racing.

== Cardboard Butterfly: The Human Struggle with Porn ==
Hunt's latest movie project deals with the omnipresence and impact of pornography addiction. Hunt has stated that it will be his last documentary.

== Personal life ==
Hunt is married to Desiree Hunt, originally from South Africa, and is the father of three children; a son, Lantz, born in 2000, and two daughters: Carolyn Abbey, born in 2003, and Madison, born in 2013. He resides in Colorado Springs, Colorado where he oversees his production company, Time & Tide Productions, Incorporated.
