= Steamboats of the Mississippi =

Steamboats played a major role in the 19th-century development of the Mississippi River and its tributaries, allowing practical large-scale transport of passengers and freight both up- and down-river. Using steam power, riverboats were developed so that they could navigate in shallow waters as well as upriver against strong currents. After the development of railroads, passenger traffic gradually switched to this faster form of transportation, but steamboats continued to serve the Mississippi River commerce into the early 20th century. A small number of steamboats are still used for tourist excursions in the 21st century.

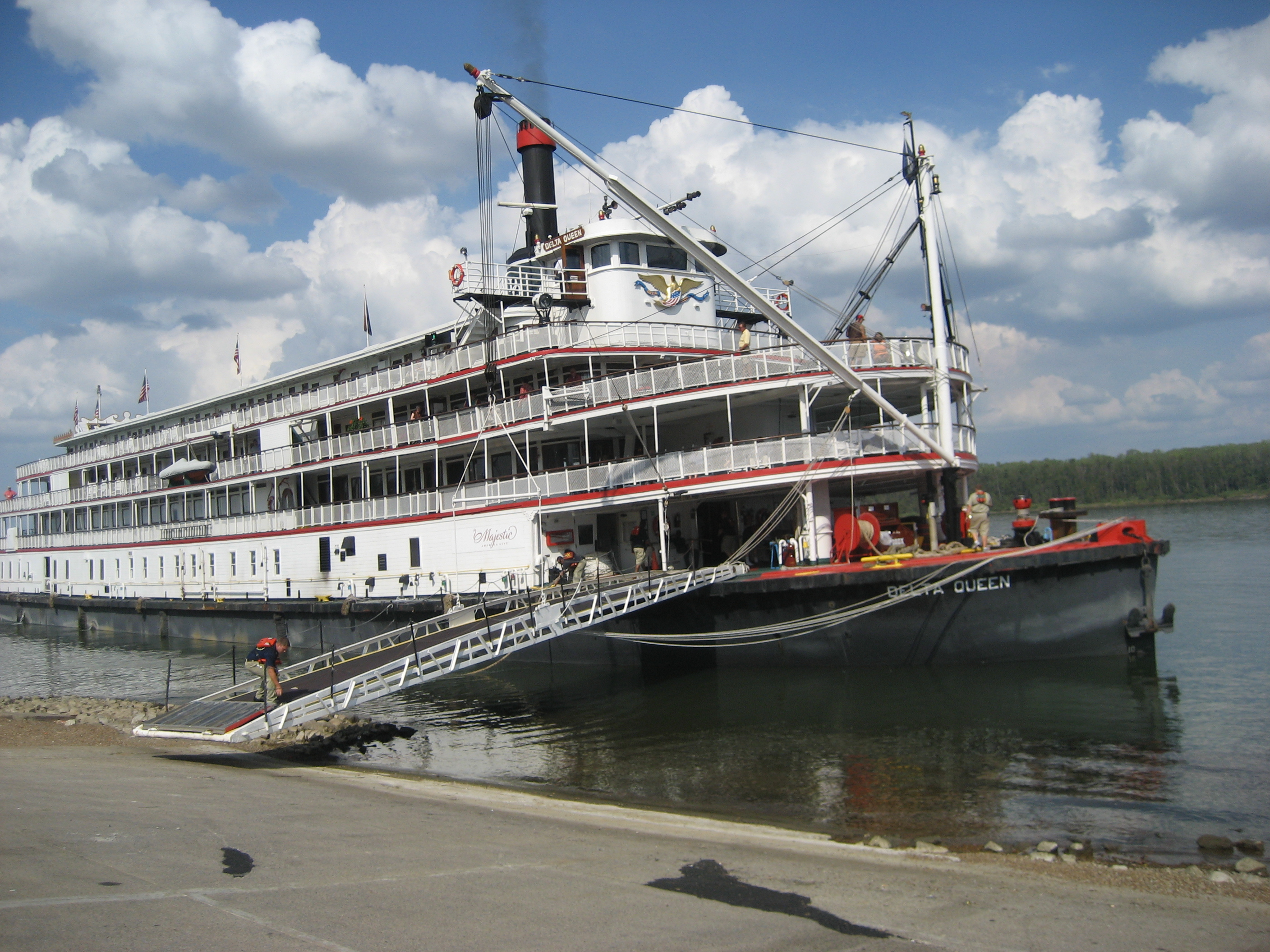
Delta Queen at Paducah, Kentucky, 2007.

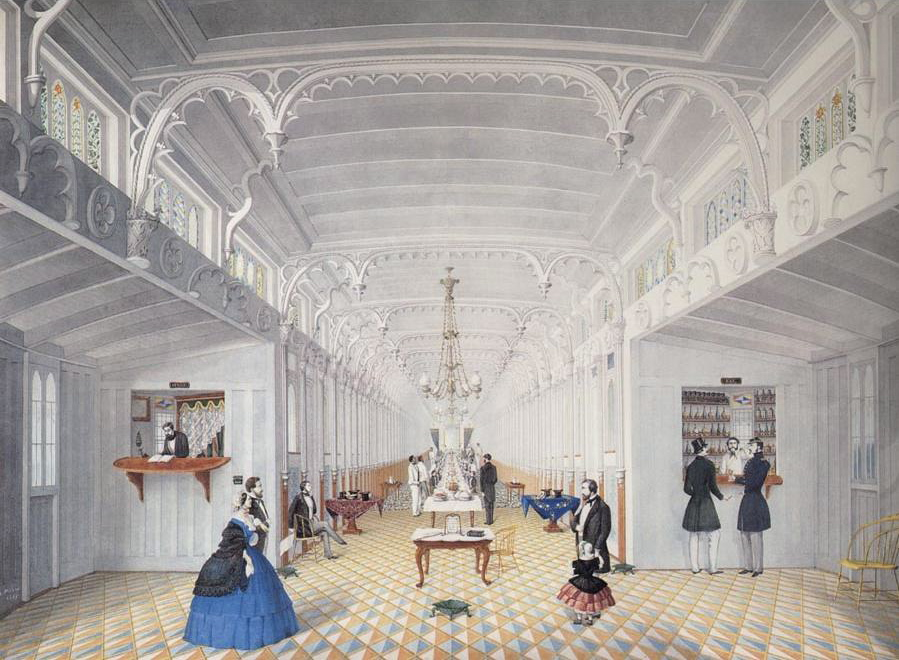
"Saloon of Mississippi River Steamboat Princess" (Marie Adrien Persac, 1861), showing elaborate interior of a prewar Mississippi steamboat

== Golden age of steamboats ==
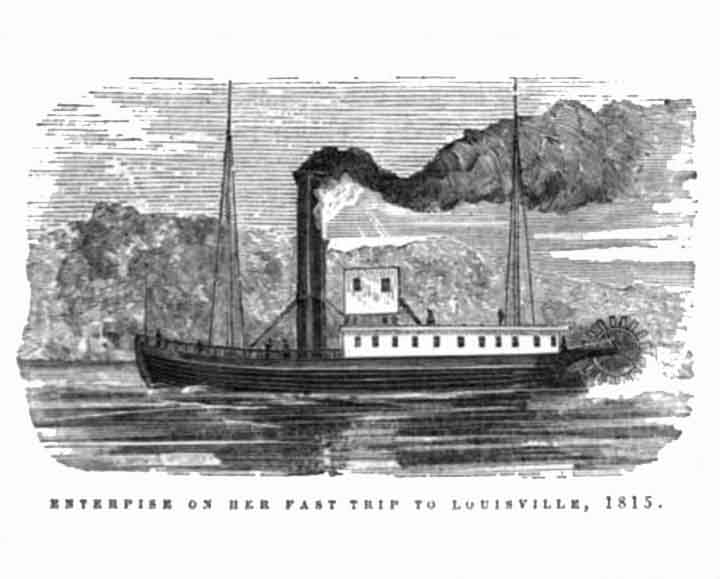
"Enterprise on her fast trip to Louisville, 1815"

The historical roots of the prototypical Mississippi steamboat, or Western Rivers steamboat, can be traced to designs by easterners like Oliver Evans, John Fitch, Daniel French, Robert Fulton, Nicholas Roosevelt, James Rumsey, and John Stevens. In the span of six years, the evolution of the prototypical Mississippi steamboat was well underway, as seen by the introduction of the first vessels:

- New Orleans, or Orleans, was the first Mississippi steamboat. Launched in 1811 at Pittsburgh, Pennsylvania, for a company organized by Robert Livingston and Robert Fulton, her designer, she was a large, heavy side-wheeler with a deep draft. Her low-pressure Boulton and Watt steam engine operated a complex power train that was also heavy and inefficient.
- Comet was the second Mississippi steamboat. Launched in 1813 at Pittsburgh for Daniel D. Smith, she was much smaller than the New Orleans. With an engine and power train designed and manufactured by Daniel French, the Comet was the first Mississippi steamboat to be powered by a lightweight and efficient high-pressure engine turning a stern paddlewheel.
- Vesuvius was the third Mississippi steamboat. Launched in 1814 at Pittsburgh for the company headed by Robert Livingston and Robert Fulton, her designer, she was very similar to the New Orleans.
- Enterprise, or Enterprize, was the fourth Mississippi steamboat. Launched in 1814 at Brownsville, Pennsylvania, for the Monongahela and Ohio Steam Boat Company, she was a dramatic departure from Fulton's boats. The Enterprise - featuring a high-pressure steam engine, a single stern paddle wheel, and shoal draft - proved to be better suited for use on the Mississippi compared to Fulton's boats. The Enterprise clearly demonstrated the suitability of French's design during her epic voyage from New Orleans to Brownsville, a distance of more than 2,000 miles (3,200 km), performed against the powerful currents of the Mississippi and Ohio rivers.
- Washington was launched in 1816 at Wheeling, West Virginia, for Henry Shreve and partners. George White built the boat and Daniel French constructed the engine and drivetrain at Brownsville. She was the first steamboat with two decks, the predecessor of the Mississippi steamboats of later years. The upper deck was reserved for passengers and the main deck was used for the boiler, increasing the space below the main deck for carrying cargo. With a draft of 4 feet (1.2 m), she was propelled by a high-pressure, horizontally mounted engine turning a single stern paddlewheel. In the spring of 1817, the Washington made the voyage from New Orleans to Louisville in 25 days, equalling the record set two years earlier by the Enterprise, a much smaller boat.

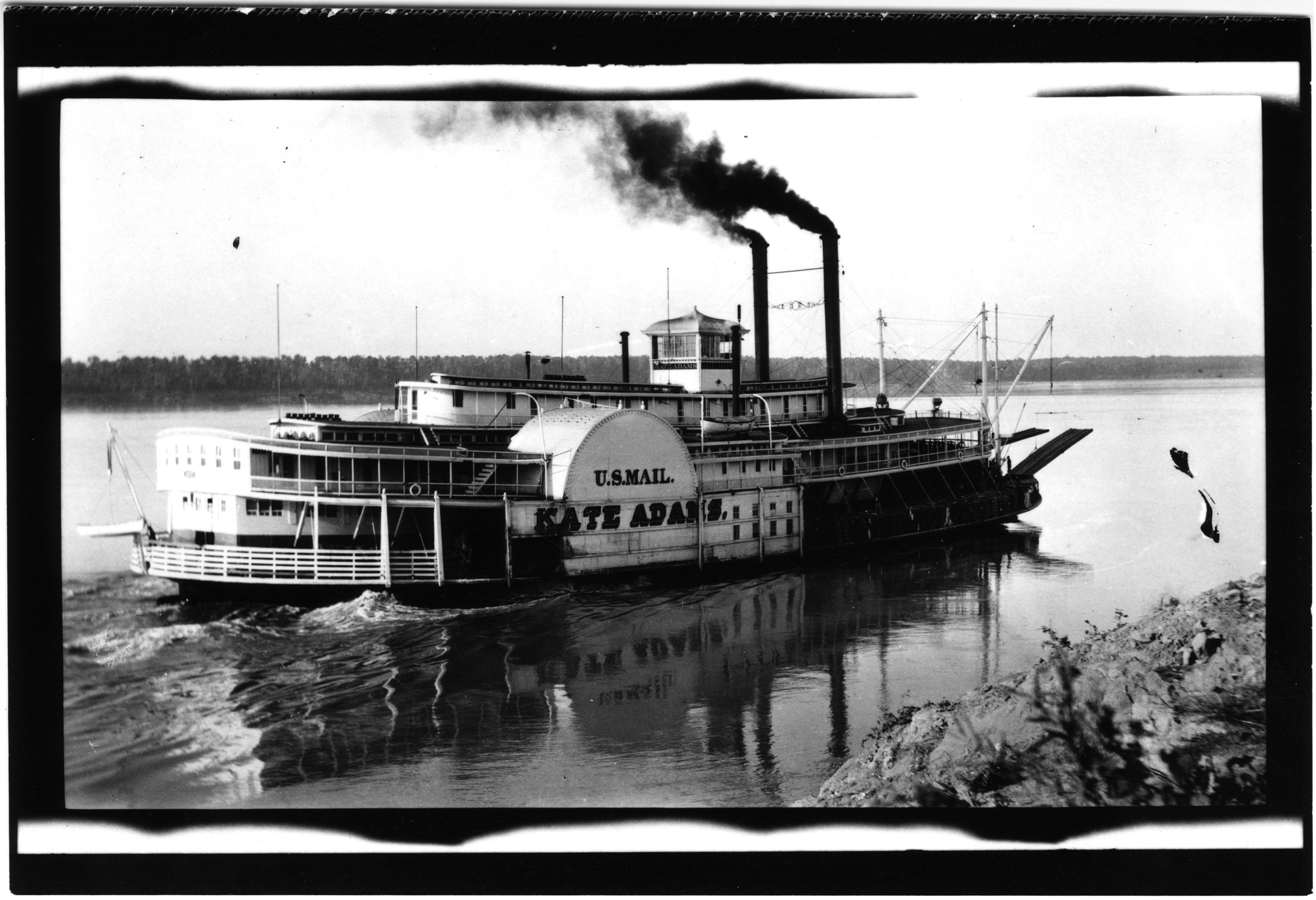
The Kate Adams, built in 1898 (the third boat of that name), was the fastest and best equipped on the river, and one of the most successful - with her steel hull, she survived until 1927. At one time, she was under the command of famed Captain Grant Marsh.

== Boiler explosions ==
Between 1811 and 1853, an estimated 7,000 fatalities occurred as a result of catastrophic boiler explosions on steamboats operating on the Mississippi and its tributaries. Due to a combination of poor boiler construction and unsafe operation, steamboat explosions were a frequent occurrence. Charles Dickens commented on the issue in his 1842 travelogue American Notes, writing, "...[American] steamboats usually blow up one or two a week in the season."

Boilers used in early Mississippi steamboats were constructed from many small pieces of riveted cast iron, as the process to produce larger, stronger sheets of metal had not yet been developed. Most suffered from poor workmanship in their construction and were prone to failure. The inherent danger of these boilers was further compounded by widespread unsafe practices in their operation. Steamboat engines were routinely pushed well beyond their design limits, tended by engineers who often lacked a full understanding of the engine's operating principles. With a complete absence of regulatory oversight, most steamboats were not adequately maintained or inspected, leading to more frequent catastrophic failures.

Due to the vast superiority riverboats then held over all forms of land transportation, passengers were willing to accept the high risk of a boiler explosion. Boat operators were not required to carry any kind of insurance and were not held liable for accidents, and so had little incentive to improve safety. Only after a great number of tragedies did this situation change. In 1825, the explosion of the Teche killed 60 people. In addition, the Ohio and the Macon both exploded the following year in 1826, the Union and the Hornet in 1827, the Grampus in 1828, the Patriot and the Kenawa in 1829, the Car of Commerce and the Portsmouth in 1830, and the Moselle in 1838.

== See also ==
- Mark Twain Riverboat
- Paddle Steamer
- Riverboat
- Steamboats of the Columbia River
- Steamboats of the upper Columbia and Kootenay Rivers
- Steamboats of the Willamette River
- Steamboats of the Yukon River
- Tourist sternwheelers of Oregon
- Lake steamers of North America
