= Caleb Hunt =

Businessman (1786–1834)

- Born: October 28, 1786; Moorestown, New Jersey, U.S.
- Died: July 24, 1834 (aged 47); Brownsville, Pennsylvania, U.S.
- Occupation: Merchant
- Spouse: Rhoda Matthews Bartlett Hunt (1789-1829)
- Children: 7

Caleb Hunt (October 28, 1786 – July 24, 1834) was a founder of the Monongahela and Ohio Steam Boat Company that built and operated the historic steamboat Enterprise.

== Early life ==
Caleb Hunt was born in Moorestown, New Jersey to Joshua and Esther Hunt, the former Esther Roberts.

In September 1790, Joshua, Esther, Caleb and his four brothers, "with two wagons, seven horses, one cow, and provisions", began a three-week journey to Fayette County in southwestern Pennsylvania. Their destination was a small, but growing, community located on the east bank of the Monongahela River in close proximity to Fort Burd. In those days it was called Redstone Old Fort, or simply Redstone. Later, the name was changed to Brownsville.

== Salem ==
From 1807 to 1810, Caleb lived at either Brownsville or Salem, a village in Columbiana County, Ohio. While living in Salem he earned money by teaching school and grinding grain.

== Brownsville ==
In 1810, Caleb made Brownsville his permanent hometown. Elisha and Caleb became partners in the operation of a store that sold general merchandise and was located in the "Neck", as the commercial center of Brownsville was called. The Hunt brothers sold a wide variety of items, ranging from cotton and woolen goods to nails and gunpowder, to local customers. They were ambitious and wanted to expand their mercantile business. To accomplish this Elisha and Caleb Hunt planned to augment the store's local business with interstate commerce via the western rivers.

It was in the "Neck", during autumn of 1811, that a chance meeting occurred between Elisha and Joseph White, a Quaker merchant from Philadelphia. As a result Caleb and Joseph White transported a cargo of general merchandise by keel boat from Brownsville to St. Louis.
