= Samuel Clement =

Mississippi politician (1788–1833)

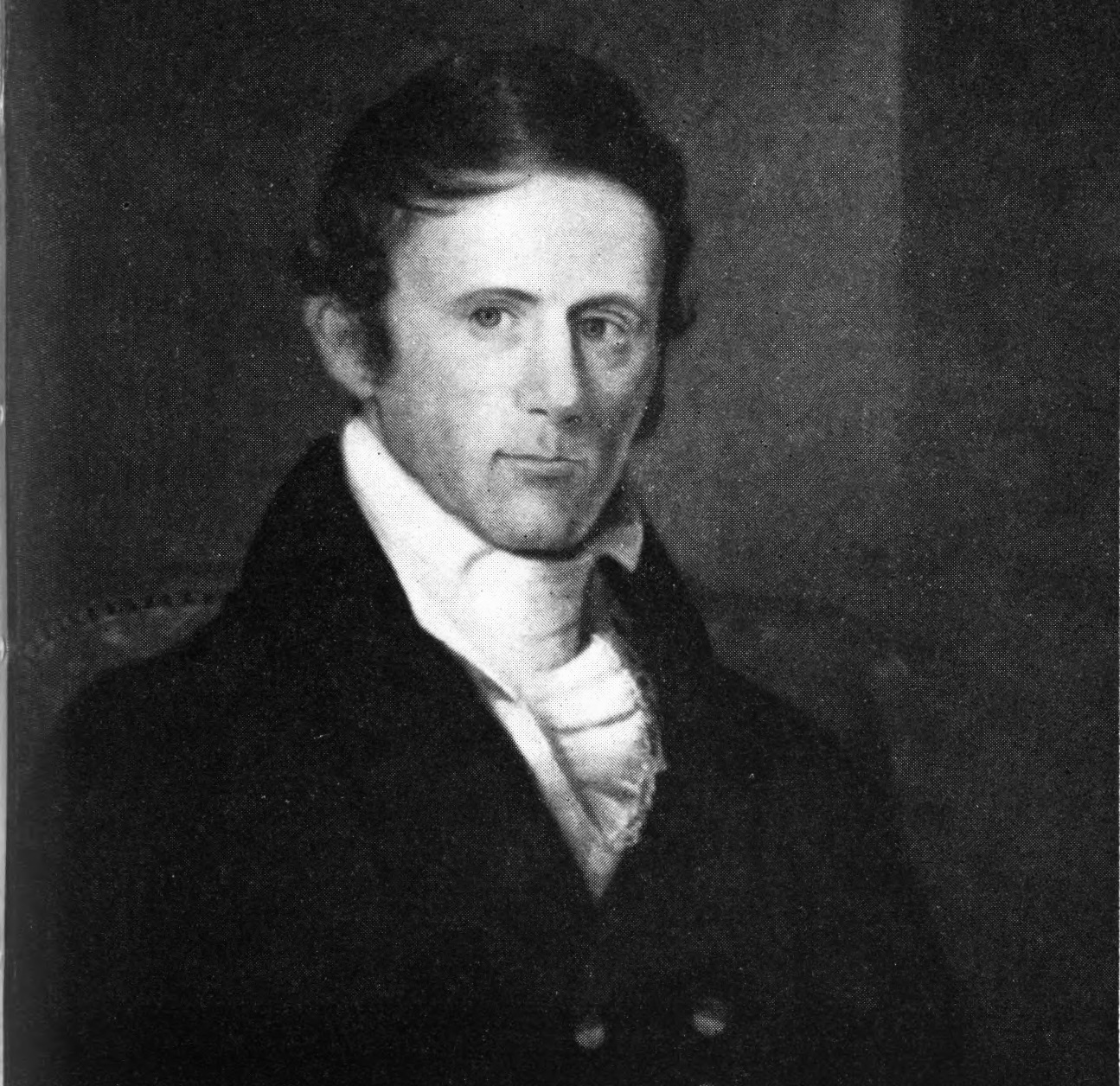
- Samuel Clement (1820s)
- Born: c. 1788; Duchess County, New York
- Died: July 20, 1833; Natchez, Mississippi

Samuel Clement (c. 1788 – July 20, 1833) was a pioneering steamboat man of the United States, plantation owner, and Mississippi state senator. He wrote to an acquaintance back east that his political service was no proof of his notability: "That is a weak evidence of greatness, many noodles get into the Legislature." In 1827 he wrote a pamphlet entitled Truth Is No Slander, opposing the presidential candidacy of Andrew Jackson. Clement died in the cholera epidemic of 1833. His granddaughter, one of the first American dollar princesses, married the Duke of Manchester.

== Early life ==
Clement was likely of Quaker stock from Dutchess County, New York. He had at least one brother, Charles Clement, who also migrated to the lower Mississippi River valley, and eventually married Henrietta Desobry, the daughter of a family of White refugees from the Haitian Revolution on Saint-Domingue, who had escaped to Cuba and were then expelled again and settled in Louisiana. As told by an aged niece of Samuel Clement, in the early 20th century:

Captain Samuel Clement began life as a sailor before the mast on one of John Jacob Astor's boats. Mr. Astor's ventures in China were sometimes exceedingly fortunate. A fair profit of a voyage to China in that day was $30,000. Mr. Astor had been known to gain $70,000 and have his money in pocket before the end of the year. He was remarkably lucky in the War of 1812. All his ships escaped capture and arriving at a time when foreign commerce was almost annihilated and tea doubled in price, his gains were so immense that that a million or more lost in other enterprises did not give him a moment's inconvenience. From a sailor, Samuel Clement rapidly rose to the position of purser, and after a few years had saved sufficient money to establish a business in New York. When Livingston and Fulton needed someone to put in charge of their steamboat, which was to defy the currents of the Mississippi, they finally determined to put Samuel Clement in command."

Clements is recorded as having been "ship's master" of the first Robert Fulton steamboat New Orleans in 1812. According to one account of the first days of steamboats, "Coal was unknown fuel, and the boatmen in those days went ashore in the wilderness, spending days cutting wood and hunting deer, turkeys, bears, squirrels, &c. for their provisions." In any case the crew and equipment of this expedition was said to be "two cabins, one in the rear reserved for ladies. Mr. and Mrs. Roosevelt were the only passengers. The crew consisted of the captain, Captain Samuel Clement; an engineer named Baker, Andrew Jack, the pilot, and six boatmen or hands. Besides those mentioned there were aboard two female servants, a man waiter and a cook. There was also a mascot, an enormous Newfoundland dog named Tiger. Thus equipped the New Orleans began a voyage that was to change the whole destiny of the West." They looked up at the Great Comet of 1811, and at that time "Attacks from Indians were a constant menace, and more than once the little crew of the New Orleans was forced to frighten away savages by allowing the steam from her engines to escape through the exhaust with a great noise."

Clement was also captain of the Vesuvius for a time, which was a sidewheel steamer launched at Pittsburgh in November 1813. The tonnage of the steamboat Vesuvius was "394 tons (Custom House measurement), and she carried over 1,300 bales of cotton, averaging 400 pounds each...Among those who commanded the Vesuvius, during her career, were Captain Frank Ogden, Capt. Clement, and Captains Robinson and John De Hart."

== Battle of New Orleans ==
Clement seems to have been a key figure in piloting the Fulton and Livingston boats, and "At the time of the battle of New Orleans he commanded one of the transports which carried General Jackson's troops, and the story is told of a dispute which arose between the captain and the general owing to the delay of the captain's boat, which had to tie up because of a fog. The high-spirited sailor and steamboat man, himself accustomed to command, found the caustic remarks for which General Jackson was famous very little to his liking, and answered the general in a fashion that General Jackson was seldom obliged to listen to. The quarrel never came to a definite head, and shortly after this Captain Clement retired from the river and settled on a plantation, Ravenswood, in Concordia Parish, Louisiana."

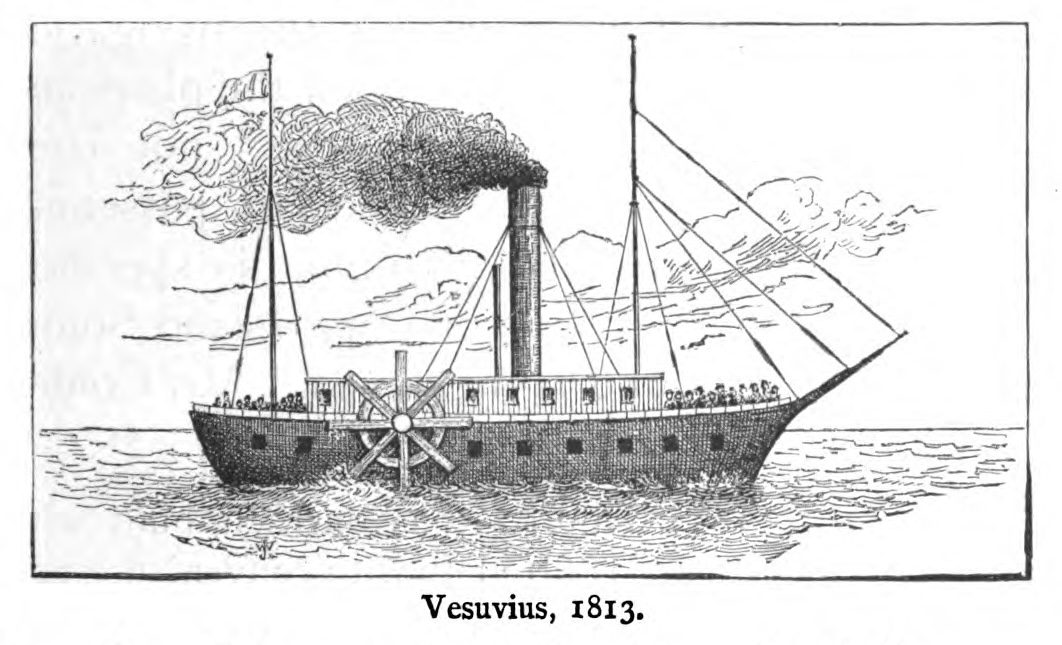
The Fulton-owned Mississippi steamboat Vesuvius, 1813

According to a newspaper account of steamboat operations relevant to the battle, published some 70 years after the fact, "In 1814, Messrs. Livingston and Fulton made a contract with the United States government to put the steamboats Vesuvius, New Orleans, Etna, and Buffalo in operation for the purpose of transporting troops and munitions of war on the Mississippi River. The Vesuvius was impressed and taken into the service in December 1814 at the city of New Orleans, shortly after the seizure, and whilst in the service, she ran aground, and from a fall of water in the river remained in that situation for nearly three months, for which Mr. Fulton claimed a remuneration equal to the profits he might have made during that tune....The claim was presented for 25 years, and long after Robert Fulton's death."

== Later life ==
Clement was an early settler in the Pine Ridge section of Adams County, Mississippi. He represented Adams County in 1821 in the Mississippi State Senate. In 1824 Clement was a candidate for Mississippi state senator for Adams County against John B. Nevitt.

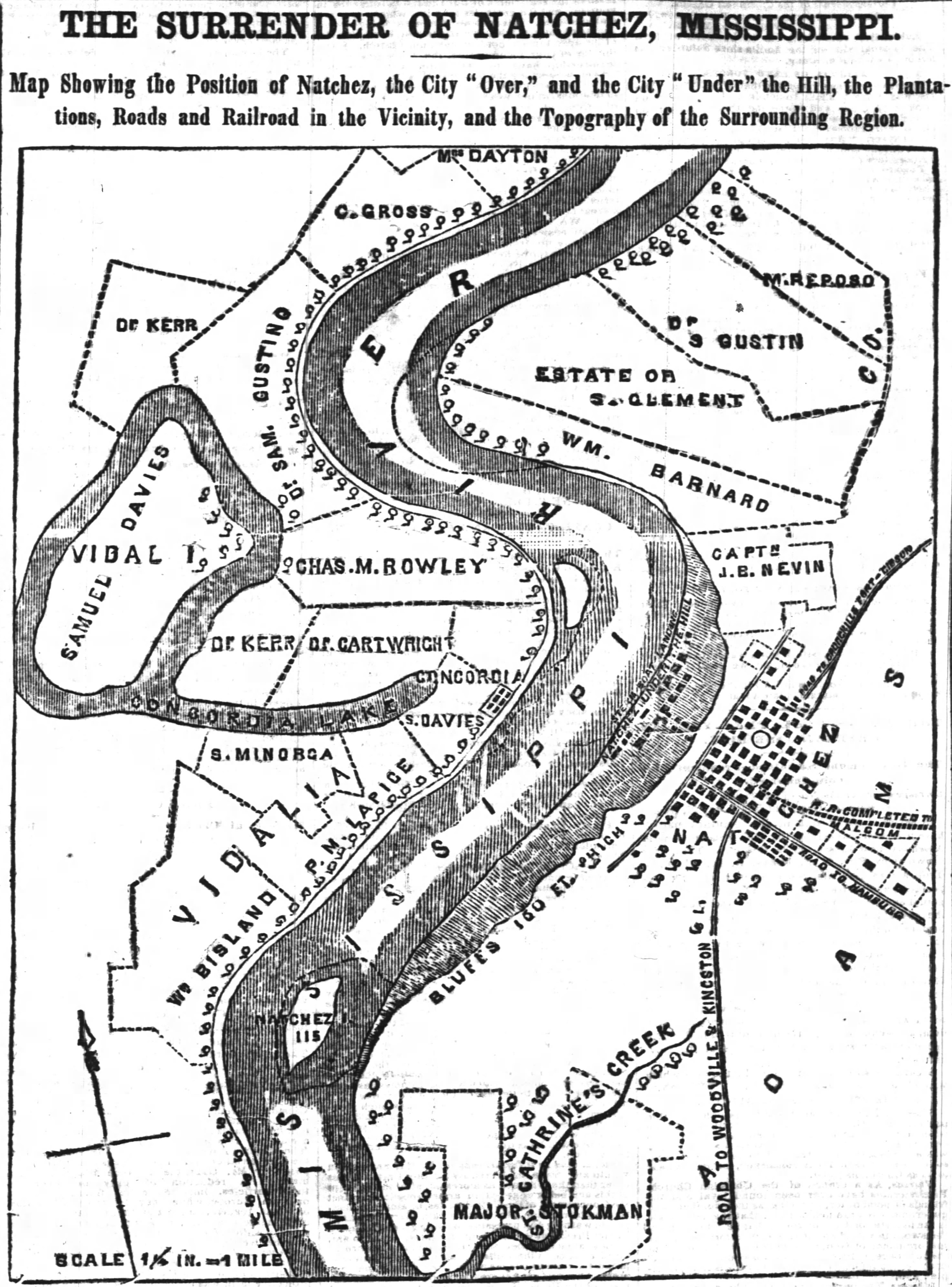
A plantation owned by "estate of Samuel Clement" in 1862 at Natchez

In December 1827, in anticipation of the upcoming 1828 U.S. presidential election, he published a "political pamphlet on the presidential question". A grand-nephew reviewed this document positively in 1958, writing "This remarkably well-written piece of campaign literature was not a flamboyant, bitter and scurrilous attack as were many of the broadsides and brochures issued at that time...Samuel Clement's pamphlet is sane, judicial, logical, and well-reasoned. It is quite a literary achievement, and shows him to have been an educated man. Captain Clement's booklet makes a study of Jackson's character and analyzes his achievements. For all students of Andrew Jackson and his time, I recommend this pamphlet as necessary reading." As summarized in Douglas McMurtie's index of early Mississippi imprints, "The author says that; General Jackson should receive no praise for his action at New Orleans, that he was a hindrance rather than a help to the victory there, that the six militia men were murdered by Jackson, and that he was a man unfit for the presidency."

Clement was invested in plantations at Lake St. John in Concordia Parish as early as 1825.

Clement died in July 1833 from the epidemic cholera that swept the South that year. The Natchez Free Trader reported that it had broken out on Clement's Louisiana plantation "and several of his slaves had died." Clement sickened while traveling on the river and "died within a few hours" upon arriving in Natchez, Mississippi.

== Personal life ==
Clement married Mary Augusta Little of New England. Clement's only child, born posthumously, was Ellen Marie Clement, afterwards Mrs. Antonio Yznaga de Valle. Ellen Clement Yznaga was the mother of four children, including businessman Fernando Yznaga and Consuelo Yznaga, who by her marriage to George Montagu, 8th Duke of Manchester in 1876, became Consuelo Montagu, Duchess of Manchester, and was one of the first American dollar princesses who married into European noble families. Consuelo Yznaga was the namesake of Consuelo Vanderbilt, who married the Duke of Marlborough in 1895.

== See also ==
- Samuel S. Boyd, cousin of his wife
- 1826–1837 cholera pandemic

== Sources ==
- Clement, William Edwards; Landry, Stuart Omer (1952). Plantation Life on the Mississippi. New Orleans: Pelican Publishing Co. LCCN 52003383. OCLC 2889401 – via HathiTrust.
- McMurtrie, Douglas C. (1945). A bibliography of Mississippi imprints, 1798–1830. Heartman's historical series no. 69. Beauvoir Community, Miss.: The Book Farm – via HathiTrust.
