= Elisha Hunt (steamboat pioneer) =

Principal founder of the company that built and operated the historic steamboat Enterprise

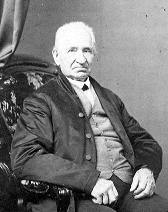
- Born: October 7, 1779; Moorestown, Burlington County, New Jersey, U.S.
- Died: July 23, 1873 (aged 93); Moorestown, Burlington County, New Jersey, U.S.
- Occupations: Farmer; Merchant
- Spouse(s): Mary Hussey (1773–1843); Sarah (Morey) Underwood (1797-1889)
- Children: 1

Elisha Hunt (1779–1873) was the principal founder of the Monongahela and Ohio Steam Boat Company that built and operated the historic steamboat Enterprise.

== Early life ==
Hunt was born on October 7, 1779, in Moorestown, New Jersey, to Joshua and Esther Hunt, the former Esther Roberts.

In September 1790, Joshua, Esther, Elisha and his four siblings, "with two wagons, seven horses, one cow, and provisions", began a three-week journey to Fayette County in southwestern Pennsylvania. Their destination was a small, but growing, community located on the east bank of the Monongahela River in close proximity to Fort Burd. In those days it was called Redstone Old Fort, or simply Redstone. Later, the name was changed to Brownsville.

== Salem, Ohio ==
On May 23, 1827, a certificate from Redstone Monthly Meeting, Brownsville, Pennsylvania requesting membership for Elisha, Mary and Emmor Hunt was accepted by Salem Monthly Meeting, Salem, Ohio.

On September 28, 1831, a certificate from Salem Monthly Meeting, Salem, Ohio requesting membership for Elisha and Mary Hunt was accepted by Redstone Monthly Meeting, Brownsville, Pennsylvania.
