= Elisha Hunt =

Elisha Hunt may refer to:

- Elisha Hunt (steamboat pioneer) (1779–1873), principal founder of the company that built the historic steamboat Enterprise
- Elisha Hunt Rhodes (1842–1917), soldier in the American Civil War
- Elisha Hunt Allen (1804–1883), American lawyer, diplomat, and Hawaiian justice
