= Monongahela and Ohio Steam Boat Company =

American company that built the historic steamboat Enterprise

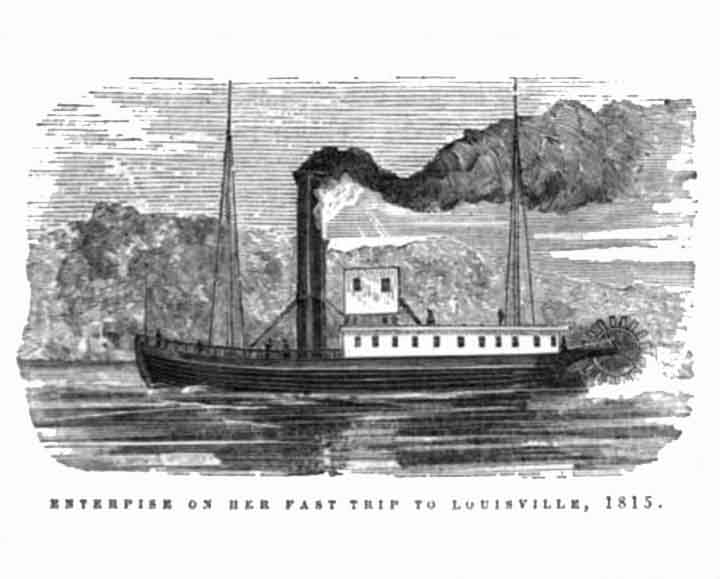
- "Enterprise on her fast trip to Louisville, 1815"
- Company type: Privately held company
- Industry: Steamboat construction Steamboat commerce
- Founder: Elisha Hunt
- Defunct: 1817
- Headquarters: Brownsville, Pennsylvania, US
- Area served: Port cities located on the Monongahela, Ohio and Mississippi rivers
- Key people: Daniel French; Caleb Hunt
- Owner: 23 shareholders

The Monongahela and Ohio Steam Boat Company (or MOSBC) was the second company to engage in steamboat commerce on the rivers west of the Allegheny Mountains in the northeastern United States. The company was founded in 1813 under the leadership of Elisha Hunt and headquartered in his store which was located close to the boat landing in Brownsville, Pennsylvania. Daniel French designed and built the engines and power trains for both the Despatch, or Dispatch, and the Enterprise. During the Battle of New Orleans in 1815, the shareholders of the Monongahela and Ohio Steam Boat Company sent the Enterprise to aid the American cause. In 1815, the Enterprise demonstrated for the first time by her epic 2,200-mile voyage from New Orleans to Brownsville that steamboat commerce was practical on America's western rivers.

== Background ==
In 1811, Robert Fulton and Robert R. Livingston were the first to enter the potentially lucrative field of steamboat commerce west of the Allegheny Mountains. They established an operation in Pittsburgh, where their steamboats were also built, and another in New Orleans, the busiest port in the West. During this age, a steamboat builder could receive a federal patent that provided both protection from being copied and the freedom to navigate any of the country's waterways. Fulton had been granted a federal patent but so had several others, including Daniel French. Fulton and Livingston decided to take additional measures to prevent another steamboat company from beginning operations on the western rivers. To this end they petitioned the states bordering the western rivers for a grant of an exclusive privilege to ply their waters by steamboat. Their requests were turned down by every state except Louisiana which granted them an exclusive privilege in 1814. In states where they did not have an exclusive privilege, Livingston and Fulton resorted to litigation under their federal patent to prevent competition.

== Elisha Hunt ==
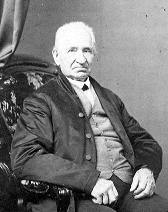
Elisha Hunt

Elisha Hunt was a resident of Brownsville where he was a prominent businessman, land owner, and a director of the Monongahela Bank of Brownsville. He owned and operated with Caleb, his younger brother, a general store which was located in the "Neck", as the commercial center of Brownsville was called. The Hunt brothers sold a wide variety of items, ranging from cotton and woolen goods to nails and gunpowder, to local customers. They were ambitious and wanted to expand their mercantile business. To accomplish this Elisha and Caleb Hunt planned to augment the store's local business with interstate commerce via the western rivers.

It was in the "Neck", during autumn of 1811, that a chance meeting occurred between Elisha and Joseph White, a Quaker merchant from Philadelphia. As a result, Caleb and Joseph White transported a cargo of general merchandise by keel boat from Brownsville to St. Louis.

== Philadelphia meeting ==
American Telegraph, Oct., 1814

During the autumn of 1812, Elisha Hunt made the 290-mile trip to Philadelphia. Here he met with Joseph White, the younger brother of Josiah White. White, a former business associate and a Quaker, introduced him to Daniel French. Daniel French was an experienced mechanic who would design and construct steam engines to power a variety of equipment which he would also design and build. This equipment just happened to include a steamboat, named the Rebecca, which was currently operating as a ferry between Philadelphia and Camden, New Jersey. Furthermore, French held a federal patent for his particular steamboat design which was propelled by one of his engines driving a stern paddlewheel.

While he was there, arrangements were made and a stock company was formed to construct steamboats and carry passengers and freight by steamboats between Pittsburgh and New Orleans. The stock of this company was divided into six shares, of which Joseph White owned two or one-third of the whole amount stock. Daniel French, a Connecticut man, owned a patent for steamboats, and had built a little stern wheel steamboat on his plan, which was then running as a ferry boat between Cooper's Point, Camden, New Jersey, and Philadelphia.

French said he could construct steamboats that would run five miles an hour, against the current of the Mississippi river, and an arrangement was made with him by which he sold to the company the right to use his patent west of the Allegheny mountains. The draft business agreement between Elisha Hunt and Daniel French reads:

"Daniel French gives Hunt one-fourth of all advantages and profits during the patent arising from French's one-half of the whole property in his new invented steam improvements. Hunt gives French five hundred dollars in advance. Said Hunt is to go from places to places to look out places for establishing French's machinery in its various applications in mills, boats and other machinery, as also to sell, let, lease and assist in setting up works for the benefit of the said French at Hunt expense, and those services shall continue during the patent term as the best interest of the company mutually considered may direct, the said Hunt shall not hold back any reasonable services requested by the said French on forfeiture of said one-fourth as granted by said French to said Hunt, as those services are the principle consideration to said French for Hunt's one-fourth of said profits."

In December 1812, Elisha and Caleb Hunt transported Daniel French, his three sons and a steam engine from Philadelphia to the valley of the Monongahela River in western Pennsylvania. The trip was documented by Caleb Hunt's grandson, James Walker Roberts.

The Philadelphia meeting between Elisha Hunt, Joseph White and Daniel French was a success. Joseph White, the third shareholder in the fledgling steamboat company, would remain in Philadelphia where his family and hardware business were located. The basic business plan was this: Elisha Hunt would promote the use of Daniel French's steam engines and then French would build them. The nucleus of a steamboat company had been formed. But before a steamboat could be built the company needed a large increase in capital.

== 1813 ==
The services of French were engaged, shops were erected at Brownsville, Pennsylvania, tools for working in iron were made, logs were cut into plank with whip saws, and with the ferry boat above mentioned as their model, they began to construct the steamboat Enterprise. Late in 1813, the keel of the Enterprise was laid.

Hunt's store was a meeting place where potential investors were presented with an opportunity to invest in the fledgling steamboat company. Elisha Hunt wrote, "The little office connected with our Brownsville store was the rendezvous of many intelligent and enterprising young men, and there all the recent inventions for improving travel, etc., were argued and discussed."

Daniel French built the steam engine at Brownsville which was installed in the Comet at Pittsburgh in 1813.

== 1814 ==
Caleb Hunt went to Louisiana for the purpose of expanding the company's steamboat line to a third boat which would operate between Louisville and New Orleans. Furthermore, this trip was a fulfillment of the business agreement between Elisha Hunt and Daniel French.

On March 1, 1814 Benjamin Henry Latrobe, serving as an agent for Fulton and Livingston, wrote from Pittsburgh to Robert Fulton, "There is a company chiefly of Quakers who are building a Steam boat on French's plan at the eastern shore 30 miles above this place."

Sometime in May 1814, the Enterprise was launched at Bridgeport.

Latrobe responded to the arrival of the Enterprise at Pittsburgh by publishing a public notice threatening the shareholders of the Monongahela and Ohio Steam Boat Company with litigation.

== 1815 ==
In August 1815, the manager of the cotton factory, named the Bridgeport Manufacturing Company, announced that it was ready to begin operations. Using Daniel French's steam engines the company would process raw cotton and wool into yarn.

Elisha Hunt was one of the principals behind the Bridgeport Manufacturing Company. He planned to process raw cotton and wool into finished goods in Bridgeport and then ship them to southern ports aboard the company's steamboats. Then the steamboats would transport raw cotton to Bridgeport to be processed into finished goods. This synergistic relationship between the manufacturing company and the steamboat company would increase the chances that both of them would be successful.

By August, the shareholders of the Monongahela and Ohio Steam Boat Co. had decided to expand their business by adding another larger steamboat to make round-trip voyages between New Orleans and Louisville. To this end they planned to raise capital by selling additional shares at $500 each.

== 1816 ==
=== February ===
==== The Dispatch at New Orleans ====
The Dispatch, owned as well as the Enterprise by the Monongahela and Ohio Steam Boat Company, steamed from Brownsville to the port of New Orleans by February 13, 1816, with important documents aboard for attorney Abner L. Duncan to use during the impending Enterprise trial. While docked at the levee, an incident occurred aboard the Dispatch that Robert Rogers, the first engineer, would record:

"We arrived early in the spring, and soon after we landed at the Levee. Edward Livingston, together with the Marshall of the district, with some others came on board, and informed our captain that they (Fulton and Livingston) had the exclusive right to navigate the waters in Louisiana with steam-boats, granted to them by the Legislature of Louisiana and they did not allow their rights infringed; but as we plead ignorance of the law, they agreed if we would leave the State with our boat, and not return, they would not prosecute us. We then took in a little freight and a few passengers and started for Alexandria at the Rapids of the Red River, and after discharging our cargo, we returned to the mouth of the river; then took up the Mississippi for Pittsburg."

Accounts of this incident were published in newspapers throughout the West.

=== May ===
==== The Enterprise trial at New Orleans ====
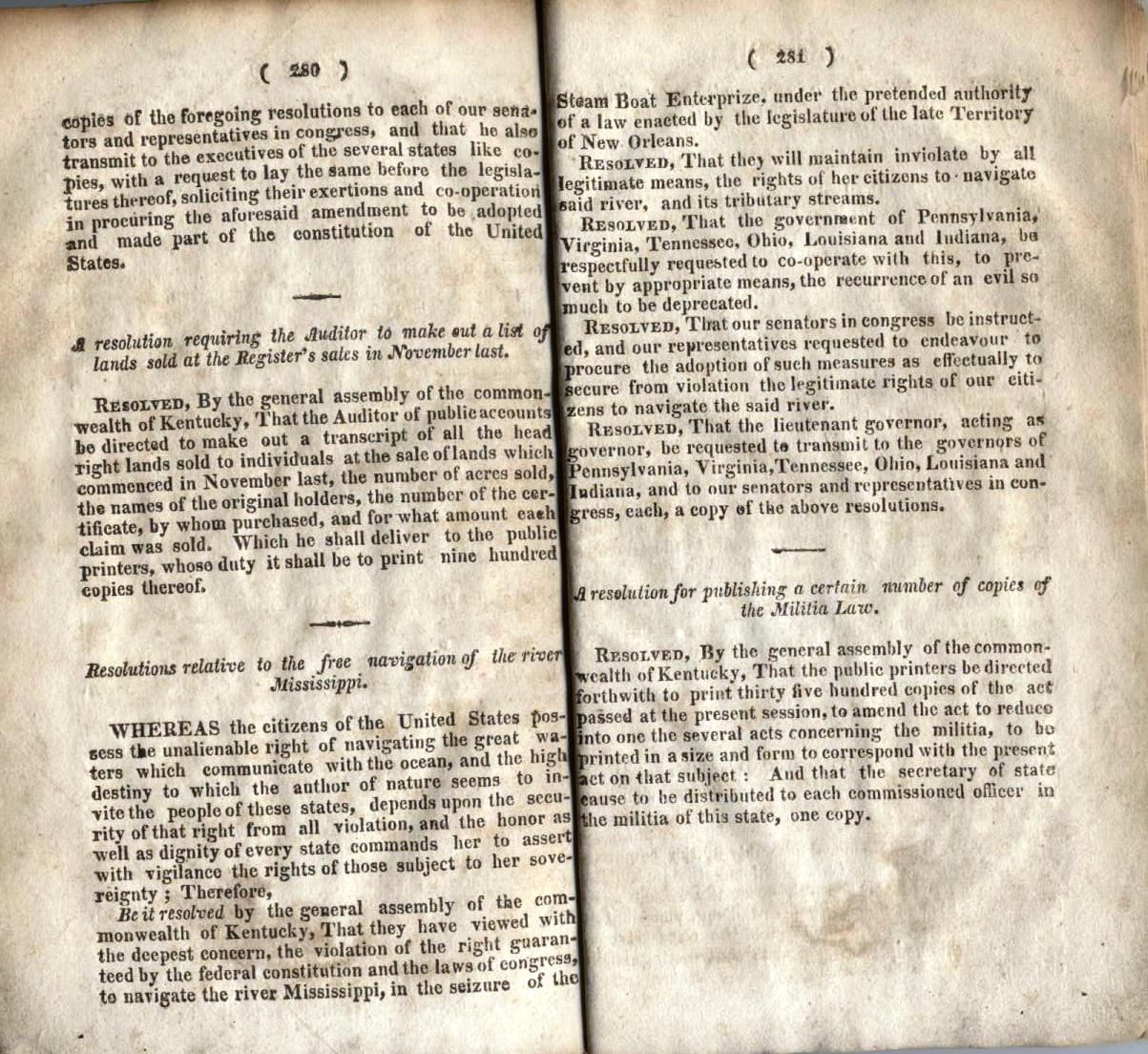
1817 Resolution by Kentucky legislature

During May 1816, the Enterprise trial, judge Dominic A. Hall presiding, was held in the old Spanish courthouse, 919 Royal Street. The plaintiffs were represented by John R. Grymes, the defendants by Abner L. Duncan. Duncan began by presenting Daniel French's 1809 federal patent for his improved steamboat engine, which powered the Enterprise. Duncan argued that this federal patent protected all of the defendants – French, Shreve and the shareholders of the Monongahela and Ohio Steam Boat Co. – from the charges by the monopolists. On May 20, Judge Hall, stating that the Territorial Legislature had exceeded its authority in granting the steamboat monopoly, dismissed the petition of the plaintiffs. A letter announcing the news of Judge Hall's decision and proclaiming its significance to the growth of steamboat commerce and the economy of the West was published in a Louisville newspaper.

During January 1817, the Kentucky legislature responded to the seizures of the Enterprise and the Dispatch by passing a resolution.

From the arrest and seizure of May 1, 1815, throughout the preliminary legal procedures, to the last testimony before Judge Hall during the Enterprise trial, Grymes and Duncan represented opposing positions. Out of court, however, they worked together as aides-de-camp for General Andrew Jackson during the recent siege of New Orleans and as conspirators engaged in profiteering from illegally seized Spanish property. Their accomplices included attorney Edward Livingston, Commodore Daniel Patterson, the smuggler Pierre Laffite, and the pirate Jean Laffite.

=== August ===
==== Final voyage of the Enterprise ====
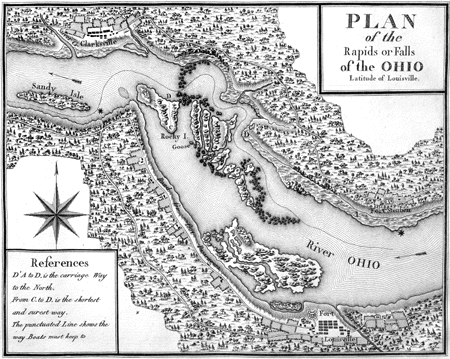
c. 1796 map showing Rocky I. where Rock Harbor was located

Steaming from New Orleans under the command of Daniel Wehrley the Enterprise reached Shippingport by August 5, 1816. The Ohio River above the Falls was too shallow for the voyage to continue, so the Enterprise was anchored in Rock Harbor.

Historian Thomas Shourds used firsthand information provided by Elisha Hunt, the principal founder and shareholder of the Monongahela and Ohio Steam Boat Company, to chronicle the final days of the Enterprise:

"The Enterprise finally reached Shippins Port, below the Falls of the Ohio river, and the river being low above, and freights dull, the Captain anchored the boat in deep water, and hiring two men to take care of her, went by land to Pittsburg. One of the men went ashore and the other got drunk and neglected the pumps, the weather was hot, the seams of the boat opened, and the Enterprise filled and sank to the bottom, where, as Elisha Hunt, in a letter written in the year 1851, says 'she still is.' Elisha further states that while he was down in Kentucky, in 1818, a man offered him $1,000 for the wreck, as he thought he could get her engine out to run a saw mill."

According to Elisha Hunt, while safely anchored in Rock Harbor during August or early autumn of 1816, the unattended Enterprise was allowed to sink.

==== Sale of Company assets ====
During August 1816, an announcement that assets of the Monongahela and Ohio Steam Boat Company would be sold was published in Brownsville's newspaper, the American Telegraph.

== Aftermath ==
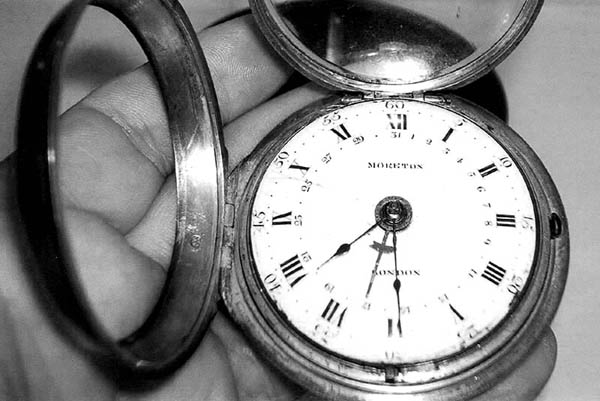
Caleb Hunt's steamboat watch

During the waning days of the Monongahela and Ohio Steam Boat Company, Caleb Hunt exchanged his share of stock for a fine English watch. This watch, with its original recorded history, has been passed down through several generations of Caleb Hunt's descendants.

== Gallery ==
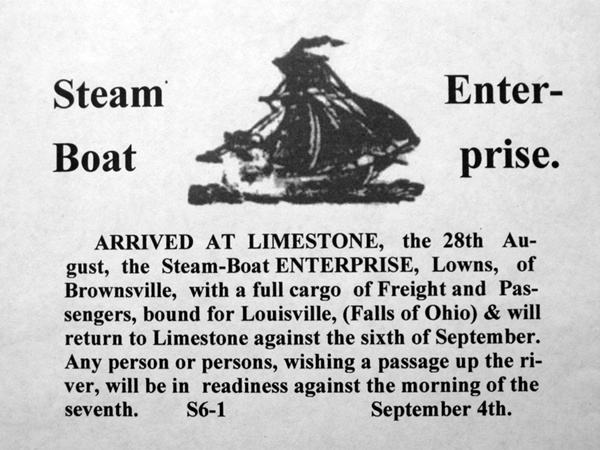
Advertisement in Lexington's Kentucky Gazette of September 4, 1815.

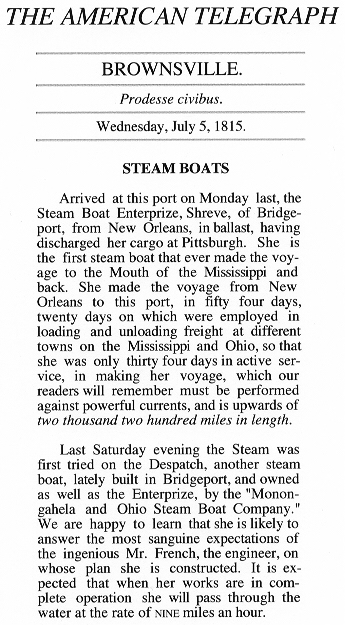
Enterprise completes her epic 2,200-mile voyage and Despatch is launched.

== See also ==
- The Navigator (1801 guide book)
- Steamboats of the Mississippi
