= Vesuvius (steamboat) =

Early American vessel (1813–1819)

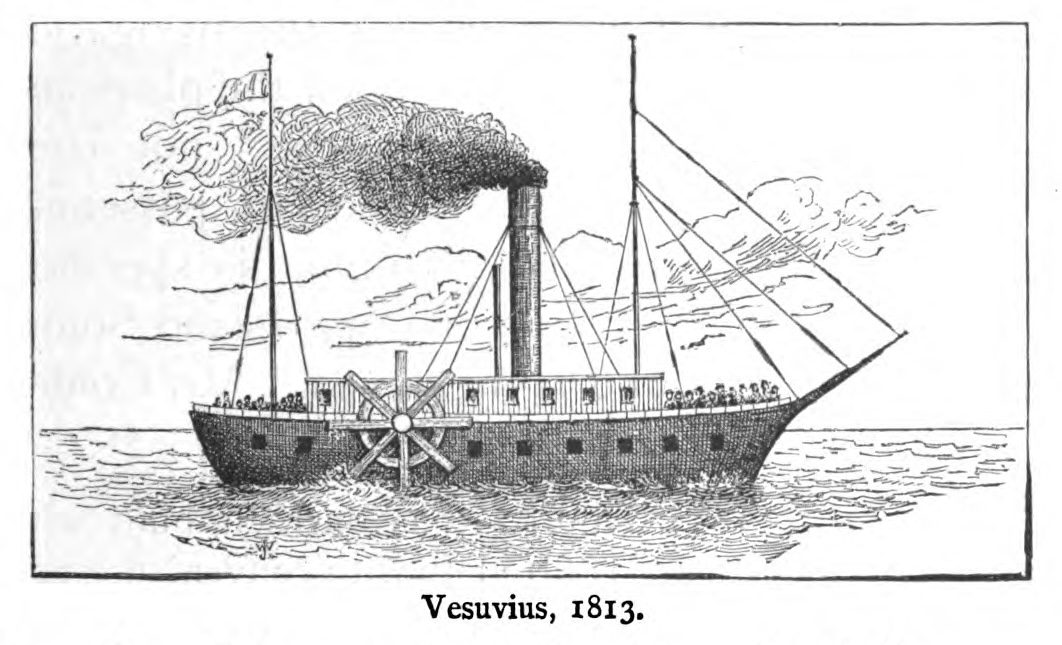
Mississippi steamboat Vesuvius

Vesuvius was a sidewheel steamer of the United States manufactured by Robert Fulton and Chancellor Livingston and launched at Pittsburgh in November 1813. Vesuvius was impressed for the Battle of New Orleans when Andrew Jackson declared martial law in the city in December 1814 but was stuck in the mud and contributed little. (Fulton heirs pressed a suit against the government for decades seeking compensation for the time she was out of service, eventually being granted a little more than $75,000.) The wartime pilot of the Vesuvius wrote and published an anti-Jackson pamphlet in 1827 before the 1828 election. Vesuvius burned and was rebuilt in 1816, ran the rivers very profitably in 1817 and 1818, and was scuttled in 1819.

== History ==
Her engine was probably constructed by Oliver Evans and his son George Evans who had a machine shop at Pittsburgh; the first boats "had low pressure engines, built on the Watt & Bolton plan; they were built at New York and transported across the Allegheny Mountains by wagons."

The speed and significance of the Vesuvius and the question of Fulton and Livingston's monopoly and patent was discussed in an April 1814 letter to the Washington, D.C. National Intelligencer. The tonnage of the steamboat Vesuvius was "394 tons (Custom House measurement), and she carried over 1,300 bales of cotton, averaging 400 pounds each. She was, at that time (1814), a new boat, just arrived from Pittsburgh, and the only steamboat at New Orleans or indeed on the river, and of course without competition as to freight or price: her speed through the water was eight miles an hour...Among those who commanded the Vesuvius, during her career, were Captain Frank Ogden, Capt. Clement, and Captains Robinson and John De Hart." Vesuvius could haul a great deal as "The whole of her hold below deck, excepting a neat cabin for ladies and the space occupied by her machinery, was appropriated to cargo. On her deck was built what in a ship would be called a round house, extending neally half her length elegantly fitted up as a cabin, having twenty-eight double berths on each side."

However, after Vesuvius "started up the river for Louisville in the spring of 1814 [she] failed to complete the trip, thereby adding weight to the charge that the Fulton steamboats were a failure. Since the contemporaneous account of this voyage does not make clear the cause of failure, whether personal, mechanical, or architectural, judgment must be reserved." According to a newspaper account of 1819, "the Vesuvius grounded on a sandbar 700 miles up the river from New Orleans about June 1 and remained there until December 3 when the river rose and floated her off. She then returned to New Orleans where she ran aground a second time on the Batture and lay there until released by a rise in the river about March 1...The precise causes for these mishaps are subjects for conjecture."

Andrew Jackson proclaimed martial law in New Orleans on December 1, 1814, by which authority he claimed authority over the Vesuvius, and by which authority the captain of the Enterprise declined to pay due wharfage fees. The Vesuvius was meant to have a role in the Battle of New Orleans but "mired in the mud on the batture side of the levee."

According to a newspaper account of steamboat operations relevant to the battle, published some 70 years after the fact:

In 1814, Messrs. Livingston and Fulton made a contract with the United States government to put the steamboats Vesuvius, New Orleans, Etna, and Buffalo in operation for the purpose of transporting troops and munitions of war on the Mississippi River. The Vesuvius was impressed and taken into the service in December 1814 at the city of New Orleans, shortly after the seizure, and whilst in the service, she ran aground, and from a fall of water in the river remained in that situation for nearly three months, for which Mr. Fulton claimed a remuneration equal to the profits he might have made during that tune. The opinion of Mr. Robinson DeHart, who commanded the Vesuvius at that time, expressed under oath, was that the steamboat Vesuvius was the only steamboat trading between Louisville, Ky., and New Orleans, and that she arrived at New Orleans during the great alarm occasioned by the appearance of the British army before the city. That her services would have been worth to her owners during the campaign, which lasted two or three months, from $800 to $900 per day. The total claim of Mr. Fulton was $75,000. The claim was presented for 25 years, and long after Robert Fulton's death. In the year 1846, a bill was finally passed by the Congress of the United States granting to his heirs the sum of $76,500—thirty-one years after the death of Mr. Fulton. NOTE. -The first steamboat, New Orleans, sunk July, 1814, therefore was not at the battle of New Orleans. The Buffalo and Etna were being built at the time the contract was made with the United States Government, and it was expected the war would have continued for several years beyond 1815, and that Mr. Fulton's boats would have been of great use to the Government on the Mississippi River. Steamboat Enterprise, Capt. Henry M. Shreve, was in the service of the United States Government at the battle of New Orleans, January 8, 1815.

According to Early Settlers of Alabama (1899), following the Battle of New Orleans, "As to Carroll's division, the sick and wounded were placed under the command of young Major Lewis Dillahunty. This was the highest compliment ever paid him during the war. By an order of the 13th of March, General Carroll ordered the sick and wounded to be placed by Major Dillahunty on board of the steamer Vesuvius, and transported to Natchez, and to be placed in camp furnished with everything necessary for their comfort. A report was made by the major, of every man who died on the way, and a copy of it preserved in his book."

Vesuvius burned to the water's edge at New Orleans in 1816. She was later rebuilt and relaunched. Back in service by the end of 1816, she ran the rivers in 1817 and 1818. In 1818 Vesuvius was said to have $47,000 freight revenue "on a single trip...half of which was said to be clear profit." Vesuvius was condemned in 1819.

== Sources ==
- Clement, Samuel (1827). Truth is no slander: therefore read; enquire; reflect. Natchez, Mississippi: Printed at the Ariel Office. McMurtrie MS Imprints No. 219, Shoemaker 28519 – via Mississippi Department of Archives and History.
- Gould, E. W. (1889). Fifty years on the Mississippi. Saint Louis: Nixon-Jones printing co.
- Hunter, Louis C. (November 1943). "The Invention of the Western Steamboat". The Journal of Economic History. 3 (2): 201–220. ISSN 0022-0507.
- Knox, Thomas Wallace (1886). The life of Robert Fulton and a history of steam navigation. New York: G.P. Putnam's Sons.
