= Alfred Hunt (steel magnate) =

First president of Bethlehem Iron Company

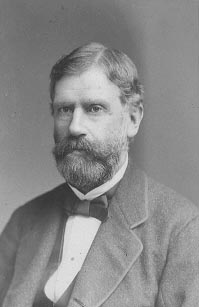
- Born: April 5, 1817; Brownsville, Pennsylvania, U.S.
- Died: March 27, 1888 (aged 70); Moorestown, New Jersey, U.S.
- Occupation(s): Mechanical engineer Industrialist; Executive

Alfred Hunt (April 5, 1817 – March 27, 1888) was the first president of Bethlehem Iron Company, precursor of Bethlehem Steel.

== Early life and education ==
Alfred Hunt was born to Quaker parentage in Brownsville, Pennsylvania, the eldest child of Caleb Hunt and his wife Rhoda Matthews, widow of Joseph Bartlett. He was the grandson of Joshua and Esther Hunt, who moved their young family from Moorestown, New Jersey to Brownsville in 1790.

Shortly after his father's death, Hunt and his six youngest siblings were brought by family members to Moorestown. Here they lived with Elisha Hunt, their father's brother, and his wife Mary (Hussey) Hunt on their 82-acre (330,000 m^{2}) farm.

Joseph Bartlett (1810-1868), Hunt's older brother, did not accompany his brothers and sisters to Moorestown. Prior to 1834, he had moved from Brownsville to Baltimore, Maryland.

== Career ==
=== Cheltenham Rolling Mil ===
Hunt's career in the iron and steel industry began in 1849 when the firm of Rowland and Hunt was formed for the purpose of operating The Cheltenham Rolling Mill in Cheltenham, Pennsylvania.

In 1850, Hunt and John C. Frémont formed a business relationship to mine gold on Frémont's property in California.

=== Bethlehem Steel ===
On July 15, 1860, Hunt was elected president by the board of directors of the fledgling Bethlehem Iron Company. He remained president until his death. Bethlehem Iron Company eventually grew into Bethlehem Steel, which rose to become the second-largest steel manufacturer in the United States prior to its downsizing, which began in the early 1980s and culminated in the company's 2001 bankruptcy.

“Mr. Hunt was very much of a gentleman and knew how to meet any person from a king to a beggar.”
John Fritz

== Death ==
Alfred Hunt died in Moorestown, New Jersey on March 27, 1888, at age 70. He is interred in the family plot at Colestown Cemetery in Cherry Hill, New Jersey.

== Bibliography ==
- Davis (1877). "Bethlehem Iron Company". History of Northampton County, Pennsylvania. Philadelphia and Reading: Peter Fritts, Chapter XLV, pp. 212–213.
- Fremont, John C. (1850). Correspondence to Alfred Hunt. (Six letters which are in a private collection.)
- Hall, P. J. (1915). "History of South Bethlehem, Pa.". Semi-centennial, the borough of South Bethlehem, Pennsylvania, 1865-1915. Quinlan Printing Co.
- Hynes, Judy (1997). The descendants of John and Elizabeth (Woolman) Borton. Mount Holly, New Jersey: John Woolman Memorial Association.
