= Zadok Cramer =

American author and publisher (1773–1813)

- Born: 1773; New Jersey
- Died: August 1, 1813 (aged 39–40); Pensacola, Florida
- Occupations: Author; publisher; printer; bookseller
- Years active: 1800–1813
- Notable work: The Navigator

Zadok Cramer (1773–1813) was an author, publisher, printer, and bookseller in Pittsburgh, Pennsylvania, United States. His book The Navigator was an influential guide for settlers and travelers on the Ohio and Mississippi Rivers in the first half of the nineteenth century.

== Early life and start of career ==
Cramer was born in 1773 in New Jersey; he later referred to his childhood in "the Pines of New Jersey". He spent much of his youth and early adulthood in Washington, Pennsylvania. He came from a Quaker family but left that faith, though he continued to wear the characteristic clothing of the Quakers.

Cramer learned the trade of bookbinding while in Washington. He came to Pittsburgh in early 1800 and started as a bookbinder. He soon bought a bookstore on Market Street that had been founded in 1798 by John C. Gilkison. He hung a sign with the head of Benjamin Franklin and called his store the "Sign of the Franklin Head". He advertised that his store had nearly 800 volumes.

His first publication was an almanac for the year 1801, printed in late 1800. The complicated presidential election of 1800 provided Cramer his second publication: an account of the struggle in the House of Representatives that decided the election. Cramer announced this book on March 21, 1801, seventeen days after Thomas Jefferson's inauguration.

Cramer also established a successful circulating library, containing mostly romances but also a few periodicals. It eventually grew to two thousand volumes.

== Almanacs ==
Cramer's Almanac for 1803 included astronomical tables; selections from contemporary British authors; a "Receipt to Cure the Ague", a disease that was then common to the west and south of Pittsburgh; an "Advertisement to Farmers"; the full text of the Constitution of the United States; and lists of marriages and deaths, which in many cases are the only accurate records from this time.

Beginning in 1804, Cramer published two kinds of almanacs: the Common Almanac and the Magazine Almanac, the latter of which contained somewhat more reading matter than the former. Also in 1804, Cramer for the first time gave "a view of the manufacturing trade of Pittsburgh". Cramer's almanacs were published for another 27 years, and they contain much valuable local historical information.

== The Navigator ==
Zadok Cramer was an inexhaustible compiler of fact. He proved to a generation of river travelers that meticulously detailed maps and topographic descriptions are the foundation of progress, and then he proved, by endlessly updating his gazetteers year to year, that facts, like a river course, often change.

— Rinker Buck

Cramer's most important work was The Navigator, a navigation guide and gazetteer for the Ohio and Mississippi Rivers. It served a need for detailed information about the rivers and surrounding country to the west and south for the thousands of merchants and immigrants who passed through Pittsburgh in the early nineteenth century. It also provided guidance for the preparation of the journey, such as advice about where to buy a river boat and what to watch for in its purchase.

The first edition was published in 1801, but it is now lost. In his 1802 edition, called The Ohio and Mississippi Navigator, the preface (dated February 1802) states that two previous editions had been issued, that they covered only the navigation of the Ohio River, and that they had sold out quickly.

Cramer updated The Navigator regularly: the book went through twelve editions in less than 25 years. The third edition contained a description of and directions for navigating the Ohio River, with only a description of the Mississippi. Directions for navigating the Mississippi came in later editions, after the Louisiana Purchase of 1803 gave the United States ownership of the western Mississippi basin. Based on accounts from the Lewis and Clark Expedition, the 1808 edition of The Navigator also included descriptions of the Missouri and Columbia Rivers. The largest edition was the eighth, published in 1814, with 360 pages; from then on it gradually got smaller, until the last edition in 1824, which had 275 pages.

Cramer sold The Navigator for a dollar a copy at his bookstore and at boatyards along the Monongahela River. The success of the book made Cramer "probably the best known publisher in the United States".

The Navigator was often plagiarized by other authors, including Thaddeus Mason Harris in his Journal of a Tour (Boston, 1805); Thomas Ash, who published a travel book in London in 1808; Samuel Cumings with his Western Pilot (1825); and Lloyd's Steamboat Directory (1856).

== Bookselling and publishing ==
In the first years of the 1800s, Cramer's store, which he advertised as the "Pittsburgh Bookstore" or "Zadok Cramer's Classical, Literary, and Law Bookstore", was the only business in Pittsburgh primarily dedicated to bookselling, and it prospered. He sold books in English, German, French, Greek, Latin, and Spanish, including dictionaries, almanacs, Bibles, schoolbooks, and books on music and law. He expanded his inventory to include stationery, playing cards, and patent medicines, and he was the first to offer wallpaper for sale in Pittsburgh.

Cramer was not the first to publish a book in Pittsburgh (John Scull had published the third volume of Hugh Henry Brackenridge's Modern Chivalry in 1793), but he was the most important early book publisher by quantity and breadth of selection. At first he did not have a press of his own and relied on the two newspaper printing offices in the same block: his early almanacs were printed by John Israel of the Tree of Liberty, and the early editions of The Navigator by John Scull of the Pittsburgh Gazette. On August 14, 1805, he announced that he had received a press, after which his publishing output increased. He published a wide range of books, including schoolbooks, religious texts, travel journals, collections of poetry, biographies, histories, books on philosophy and law, plays, belles-lettres, and books of local interest.

In 1808 Cramer went into partnership with John Spear, whereupon the firm was renamed Cramer & Spear. In 1810 William Eichbaum Jr. became a partner after having served an apprenticeship of seven years, and the business became Cramer, Spear & Eichbaum. It kept this name until 1818, the year of the death of Elizabeth Cramer, Zadok's widow, when Eichbaum withdrew. The business later became Johnston & Stockton and lasted until 1850.

== Travels and death ==
Cramer traveled extensively to gather information for The Navigator. He journeyed down the Ohio River in 1806, and he visited Kentucky in 1810. The New Orleans, built in Pittsburgh and launched in 1811, was the first steamboat on the western rivers of the United States; Cramer traveled on it twice from Natchez, Mississippi, to New Orleans, and included information about the steamboat and its river route in The Navigator.

Cramer's health suffered from his intense dedication to his work, and he became ill with tuberculosis. His physician recommended that he travel to Havana, Cuba, to improve his health, but on the way he died in Pensacola, Florida, on August 1, 1813. His body was buried there in an unmarked grave.

Cramer had been planning new business projects up to his death. His business was continued by his widow and his partners, who attempted to carry out his most cherished plan, the publication of a magazine. The first issue of The Western Gleaner or Repository for Arts, Sciences, and Literature, a monthly magazine of 64 pages, was published in December 1813. It ran until June 1814, when it was discontinued for financial reasons.
