= Esther Hunt =

American pioneer (1751–1820)

- Born: Esther Roberts; September 4, 1751; Burlington County, New Jersey, United States
- Died: February 5, 1820 (aged 68); Burlington County, New Jersey, United States
- Spouse(s): Joshua Hunt (1778–1792); John Collins (1807–1817)
- Children: 7
- Parent(s): Enoch Roberts; Rachel Coles

Esther Hunt (September 4, 1751 – February 5, 1820) was a pioneer who lived on America's frontier as a wife, a mother and a leader in her Quaker faith.

== Early life at Moorestown ==
Born Esther Roberts, she was the youngest of five children of Enoch Roberts and Rachel Coles. The Roberts family lived at Evesham Township, New Jersey. Esther's mother died when she was about seven years old. Esther Roberts and Joshua Hunt were married on November 19, 1778 in the Friends Meetinghouse at Moorestown Township, New Jersey. Joshua Hunt was the first teacher in the Moorestown Friends School. While living in Moorestown, Esther and Joshua had six children.

In September 1790, Esther and Joshua and their five children, "with two wagons, seven horses, one cow, and provisions", began a three-week journey to Fayette County in southwestern Pennsylvania. Their destination was a small, but growing, community located on the east bank of the Monongahela River in close proximity to Fort Burd. In those days it was called Redstone Old Fort, or simply Redstone. Later, the name was changed to Brownsville.

== Life at Brownsville ==
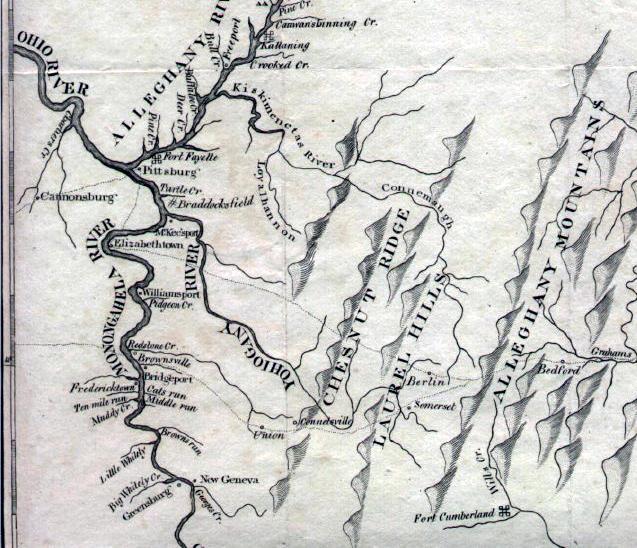
1803 map showing Brownsville and Redstone Creek

In early October, the tiny caravan reached the new home where the Hunt family would live in a log cabin during the winter season. On July 27, 1791 Joshua purchased a property, consisting of a dwelling and 195 acres (0.79 km^{2}) of land, from John and Sarah Cadwallader. Located on the south bank of Redstone Creek, Hunt's farm was about two miles (3 km) east of the creek's confluence with the Monongahela River and slightly to the west of Colvin Run. Their homestead, which they named "Hunt Pleasant", consisted of a log dwelling nestled amidst walnut trees and steep hills.

Rachel Hunt, Esther and Joshua's seventh child and only daughter, was born October 24, 1791.

After returning from a trip back home to Moorestown, Joshua Hunt died February 26, 1792. He was 39 years old. Esther Hunt wrote about her husband and her concerns:

He was one endowed with the savor of Truth, a good neighbor, a tender father, able to instruct his children, temporally and spiritually; except the Lord help we shall perish. My loss is inexpressible, having my dear companion taken from me by death, and I left in this strange land with six children, the youngest about four months old. I can but mourn under a sense thereof, though not as one without hope.

Esther decided to remain at Hunt Pleasant. The ages of her children ranged from Elisha, who was a little over 12 years, to Rachel, who was just four months. Now a widow, Esther continued to run the farm and raise her children alone, without her "dearest companion and bosom friend". Nevertheless, in June 1794 she was appointed an elder in the Redstone Monthly Meeting, a reflection of the high esteem that she was held by the men and women of her faith.

She traveled extensively, always on horseback. In October and November 1796 she visited Moorestown and Evesham.

== Later life at Moorestown ==
On June 3, 1807, Esther Hunt married John Collins, a Quaker minister from Moorestown, in the Redstone Meetinghouse. She had previously conveyed an equal portion of Hunt Pleasant to each of her children. Then Esther and her daughter, Rachel, removed to her husband's home in her previous hometown.

Rachel Hunt and David Roberts, the son of Joseph Roberts and Susanna Coles, were married February 15, 1815 in the Moorestown Meetinghouse.

Esther and her close friend Ann Edwards drowned February 5, 1820 while attempting to cross the Delaware River in a horse-drawn carriage which broke through the ice.

== Images ==
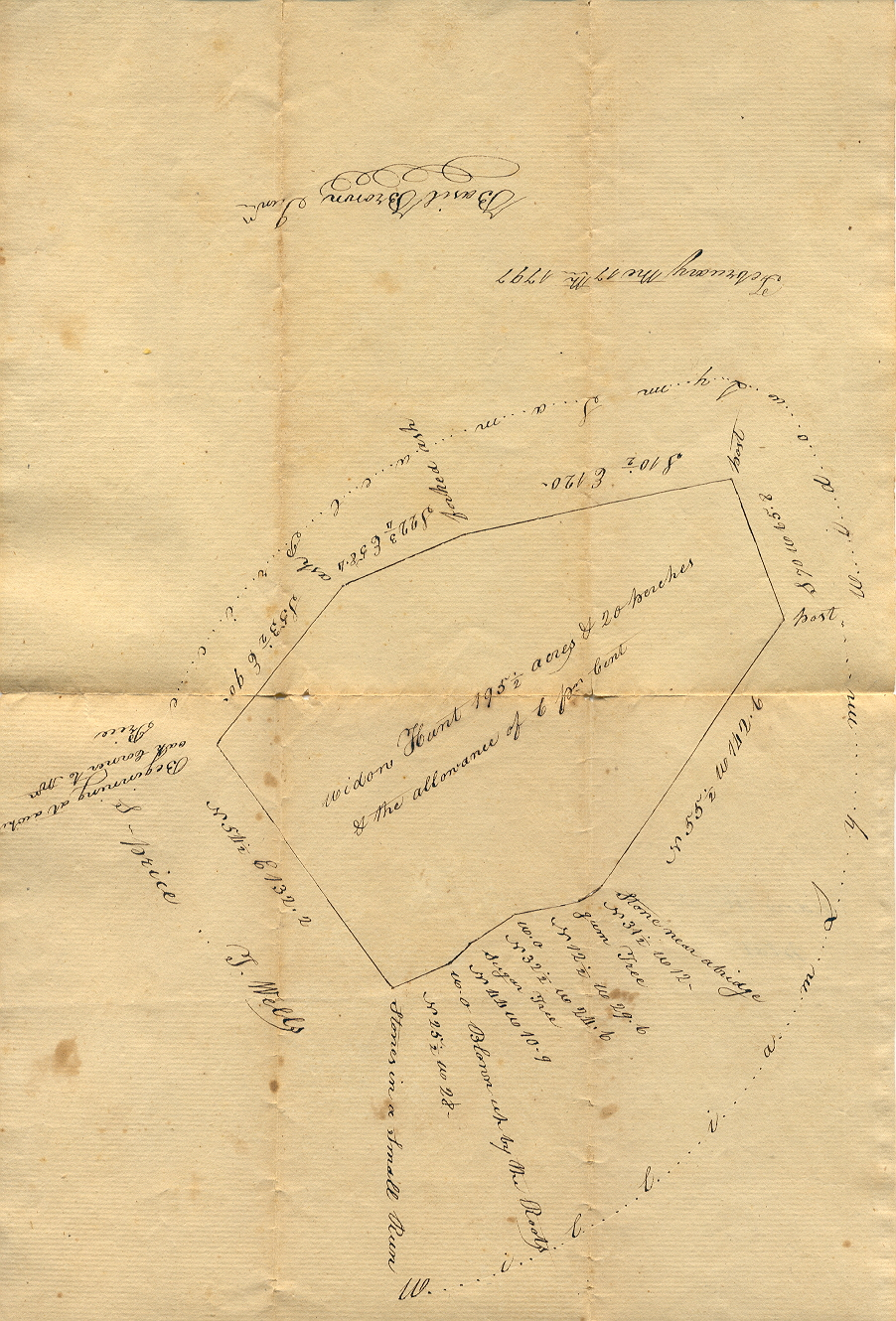
Hunt Pleasant

== See also ==
- Alfred Hunt
- Monongahela and Ohio Steam Boat Company

== Bibliography ==
- Horn, W. F. [ed.] (1945), The Horn papers: early western movement on the Monongahela and upper Ohio, 1765–1795, volume 3, Scottsdale, PA: Herald Press
- Roberts-Hunt Family Papers, Friends Historical Library of Swarthmore College, Swarthmore, Pennsylvania
- The Friend (1873), "Esther Collins and Ann Edwards", The Friend, a religious and literary journal, Volume XLVI, No. 46 and 47, Philadelphia: William H. Pile, pp. 362, 370-3
- Hynes, Judy, et al. (1997), The descendants of John and Elizabeth (Woolman) Borton, Mount Holly, New Jersey: John Woolman Memorial Association, p. 23-4
- Lamborn, Suzanne Parry (2006), John and Sarah Roberts, with many related families, Morgantown, Pennsylvania: Masthof Press, ISBN 1-932864-58-X
- Specht, Neva Jean (1997), Mixed blessing: trans-Appalachian settlement and the Society of Friends, 1780–1813, Ph. D. dissertation, University of Delaware
- Specht, Neva Jean (2003), "Women of one or many bonnets?: Quaker women and the role of religion in trans-Appalachian settlement", NWSA Journal 15 (2): 27-44
- Woodward, E. M. (1883), History of Burlington County, New Jersey, with biographical sketches of many of its pioneers and prominent men, Philadelphia: Everts & Peck, pp. 270-1
