= Israel Gregg =

American steamboat captain (1775–1847)

- Born: February 20, 1775; Loudoun County, Virginia
- Died: June 20, 1847 (aged 72); Butler County, Ohio
- Occupations: Steamboat captain Clock and watch works maker Sheriff
- Spouses: Elizabeth Hough; Phebe Kelley
- Children: Albinah, b: May 17, 1799; Rebecca, b: Dec. 16, 1800; Marie, b: March 10, 1803; Joseph, b: September 15, 1805; Susan, b: January 24, 1808; Mary, b: April 20, 1811; Marian, b: April 9, 1812; Amos, b: August 25, 1814; William, b: January 13, 1816; Henry, b: March 8, 1818; Jane H., b: 1822; Sarah, b: 1825
- Parent(s): Thomas Gregg; Rebecca Janney

Israel Gregg (February 20, 1775 – June 20, 1847) was the first captain of the historic steamboat Enterprise. From June to December 1814, Israel Gregg commanded the Enterprise during two voyages from Louisville, Kentucky to Pittsburgh, Pennsylvania that were performed against strong currents of the Ohio River. With these voyages Israel Gregg and the Enterprise demonstrated for the first time that steamboat commerce was practical on the Ohio River.

== Loudoun County, Virginia ==
Israel Gregg was born to Thomas Gregg, a wheelwright, and Rebecca Janney, his wife. His parents were married on October 7, 1762 in a Quaker ceremony at Goose Creek, renamed Lincoln, an old community located in Virginia's Loudoun County that was founded by Quakers. Israel Gregg was born to a family that was both large and prominent, the Greggs and Janneys having made the Loudoun Valley their home for many years. Israel Gregg began an apprenticeship in 1790, completing it in 1796. On May 29, 1797 he was granted a certificate of acceptance by Redstone Monthly Meeting, Brownsville, Fayette County, Pennsylvania.

== Fayette County, Pennsylvania ==
On July 12, 1798 Israel Gregg and Elizabeth Hough (September 15, 1776 - March 27, 1820) were married in Brownsville, her hometown. Joseph Hough (February 26, 1783 - April 23, 1853) was bound to Israel Gregg, his brother-in-law, from 1798 to 1804 as an apprentice to learn the craft of making works for clocks and watches. A tall case clock, its works crafted by Israel Gregg, was displayed by the Carnegie Museums of Pittsburgh.

Thomas Gregg's will of December 13, 1799 conveyed to Israel a small lot (63 by 125 feet) in Bridgeport, a small community bordering Brownsville to the south.

In 1805, Israel Gregg was a pilot on the flatboat Blackbird during a voyage from Brownsville to New Orleans with a cargo of flour.

Founded in 1812, The Monongahela National Bank of Brownsville listed Israel Gregg as one of its founding directors.

== The Enterprise ==
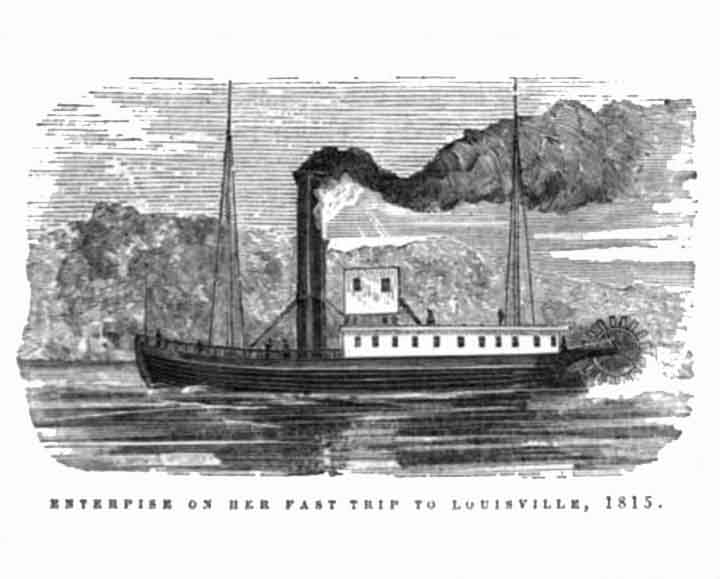
"Enterprise on her fast trip to Louisville, 1815"

Israel Gregg joined a group of Brownsville-area entrepreneurs that had formed a company to transport passengers and cargo between Brownsville and New Orleans by steamboat. By June, 1814 the company had launched its first steamboat, the Enterprise, and Israel Gregg was her first captain. The first leg of Israel Gregg's initial Ohio River voyage as a steamboat captain was performed with the current of the Monongahela River from Brownsville to Pittsburgh. Then Gregg navigated the Enterprise with the current of the Ohio River from Pittsburgh to Cincinnati, finally reaching Louisville, Kentucky. From Louisville, Gregg commanded the Enterprise against the current of the Ohio River, finally reaching Pittsburgh. From Pittsburgh the Enterprise returned to Louisville, then steamed homeward against the river's current to Cincinnati, Steubenville, Pittsburgh, and finally reaching Brownsville on December 11, 1814.

Israel Gregg was replaced as captain of the Enterprise with Henry Shreve, a Brownsville resident and experienced keelboat captain. Shreve's extensive knowledge of the western waters, particularly below Louisville, would be important during a voyage to New Orleans. Government records of December 21, 1814, list Henry Shreve as the person responsible for the military supplies, that had been loaded aboard the Enterprise, and their delivery to American forces at New Orleans.

== The Dispatch ==
Meanwhile, construction of a new steamboat, the Dispatch, was underway at Bridgeport, but she wouldn't be ready to make a voyage for another six months. In the meantime, Israel Gregg would remain at home in Bridgeport during the first half of 1815:

- On January 1, 1815, borough records mention the amount to be paid to Gregg for a lot and construction of Bridgeport's first school.
- On April 26, 1815, Bridgeport's Borough Council awarded to Gregg the right to build a warehouse on public property and operate it for ten years.
- During the April session of 1815, Fayette County court appointed Gregg a commissioner, charging him, and two other appointees, with reporting on the propriety of Bridgeport borough becoming a township. During the August session of 1815, the commissioners favorable report was presented to the court.
- William Gregg would be born on January 13, 1816, indicating that during April, 1815 his mother and father, Israel Gregg, were together in Bridgeport.

Israel Gregg became captain of the Dispatch and, in the fall of 1815, he navigated her southward on the first leg of a planned trip to New Orleans. Beset with many difficulties en route, Gregg transferred command of the Dispatch to Henry Bruce at Louisville and returned home to Bridgeport. The Dispatch and captain Bruce finally reached her destination by February 13, 1816 according to the New Orleans Wharf Register.

In 1816, Israel Gregg was listed as a tax-paying merchant of Bridgeport.

On June 19, 1818, Israel Gregg is recorded in the New Orleans Wharf Register as master of the steamboat Napoleon.

Joseph Hough reported that in the Spring of 1819 he made a 19-day voyage from New Orleans on the steamboat General Clark, commanded by his brother-in-law: captain Israel Gregg. The General Clark is recorded in the New Orleans Wharf Register for July 6, 1819 with John Sowers as her master.

== Butler County, Ohio ==
On December 5, 1822 Israel Gregg and Phebe Kelley were married.

Israel Gregg was elected sheriff of Butler County, serving from 1835 to 1839.

== Gallery ==
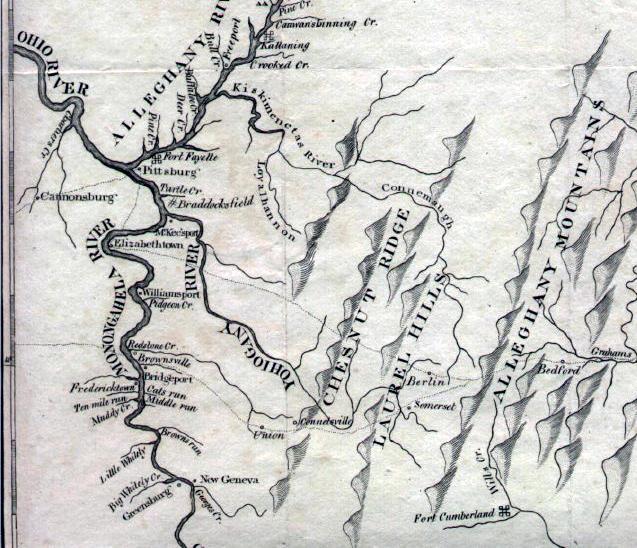
1803 map of western Pennsylvania
