= The Navigator (Cramer book) =

- Author: Zadok Cramer
- Language: English
- Publication date: 1801

The Navigator, written by Zadok Cramer and first published in 1801, was a guide for settlers and travelers moving westward into or through the interior of the United States during the first half of the 19th century.

Its subject matter is described on its title page:

The Navigator; containing directions for navigating The Monongahela, Allegheny, Ohio and Mississippi Rivers; with an ample account of these much admired waters, from the head of the former to the mouth of the latter; and a concise description of their towns, villages, harbors, settlements, &c. With maps of the Ohio and Mississippi. To which is added an appendix, containing an account of Louisiana, and of the Missouri and Columbia Rivers as discovered by the voyage under Lewis and Clark. Eighth Edition--Improved and Enlarged.

Cramer enlarged, corrected and expanded it through 12 editions in 25 years. Though priced at one dollar it was very popular.

The eighth edition was published in 1814, contained 369 pages, as well as dozens of maps detailing the navigable waterways and all their hazards.

In 1966 a facsimile version of the eighth edition was printed and bound in hardcover by Readex Microprint Corporation, and was assigned the Library of Congress Catalog Card number 66-26332.
