= Horn Papers =

1933-36 genealogical hoax

The Horn Papers were a genealogical hoax consisting of forged historical records pertaining to the northeastern United States from 1765 to 1795. They were published by William Franklin Horn (1870–1956) of Topeka, Kansas, between 1933 and 1936, and presented as a transcription of documents of his great-great-great-grandfather, Jacob Horn (died 1778), and other members of the Horn family.

== Overview ==
The Horn Papers first appeared publicly in 1932 in letters sent from Topeka to the editors of the Washington, Pennsylvania, Observer and the Waynesburg, Pennsylvania, Democrat-Messenger in which their author claimed to possess important historical documents relating to the area. From 1933 to 1936 the newspapers printed excerpts from Horn's manuscripts and diaries. Horn even moved to his ancestral home of Waynesburg and through speeches became well known as an historical expert.

Material in the papers included diaries, Virginia court records, and maps. They were notable for their great level of detail, especially concerning the lives of the common people. Because the papers appeared to supply information about famous historical figures and to fill gaps in existing historical knowledge, they were received enthusiastically despite some apparent contradictions.

Although a minority opposed Horn, on August 11, 1936, his claims appeared to have been corroborated when he announced that he had dug up two lead plates dated 1795 in a location predicted by the papers.

The apparent find increased the confidence of members of the Greene County, Pennsylvania, Historical Society, who sponsored the reissuing of the papers in book form. In 1945 the papers were published as a three-volume collection entitled The Horn Papers: Early Western Movement on the Monongahela and Upper Ohio, 1765–1795.

A year later, a report by a committee of representatives of historical societies from the region concluded in The William and Mary Quarterly that the first two volumes were substantially hoaxes.

There is no conclusive explanation why W.F. Horn devoted such a great effort to the forgeries. Time magazine attempted to interview Horn in October 1947. According to their report, "In Topeka last week, 77-year-old William Horn said nothing. His wife told newsmen that he had suffered a stroke. As to the Horn Papers, he was 'no longer interested'."
