= New Orleans (1811 steamboat) =

Mississippi and Ohio River steamboat (1811–1814)

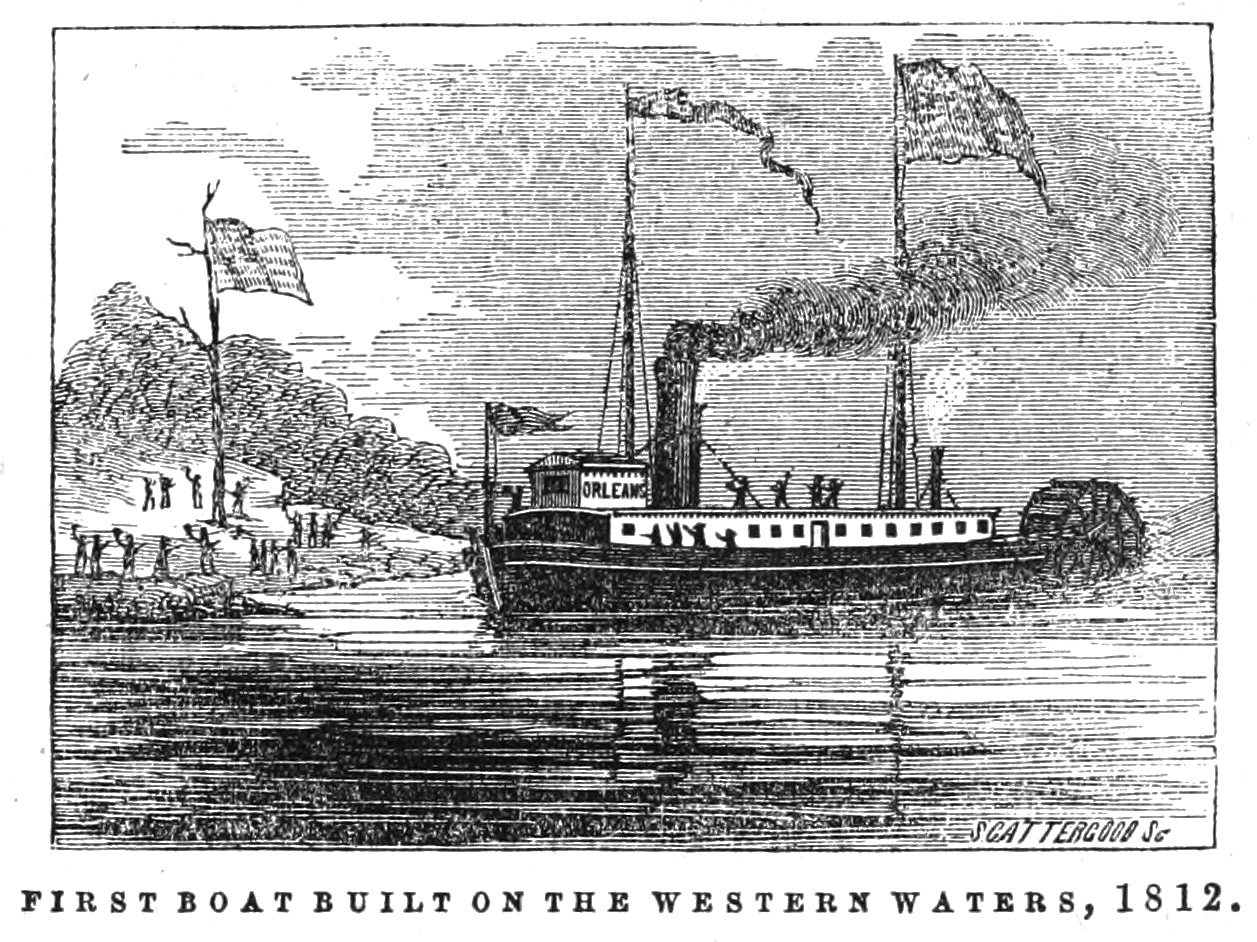
- The New Orleans in an 1856 engraving. While this image depicts the vessel as a sternwheeler, the evidence indicates that she was a sidewheeler.

History
- Name: New Orleans
- Owner: Robert Fulton and Robert R. Livingston
- Builder: Nicholas Roosevelt
- Launched: March 1811
- Out of service: July 14, 1814
- Fate: Sank

General characteristics
- Type: Steamboat
- Length: 148 feet 6 inches
- Depth: 12 feet

New Orleans was the first steamboat on the western waters of the United States. Her 1811–1812 voyage from Pittsburgh, Pennsylvania, to New Orleans, Louisiana, on the Ohio and Mississippi rivers ushered in the era of commercial steamboat navigation on the western and mid-western continental rivers.

== Background ==
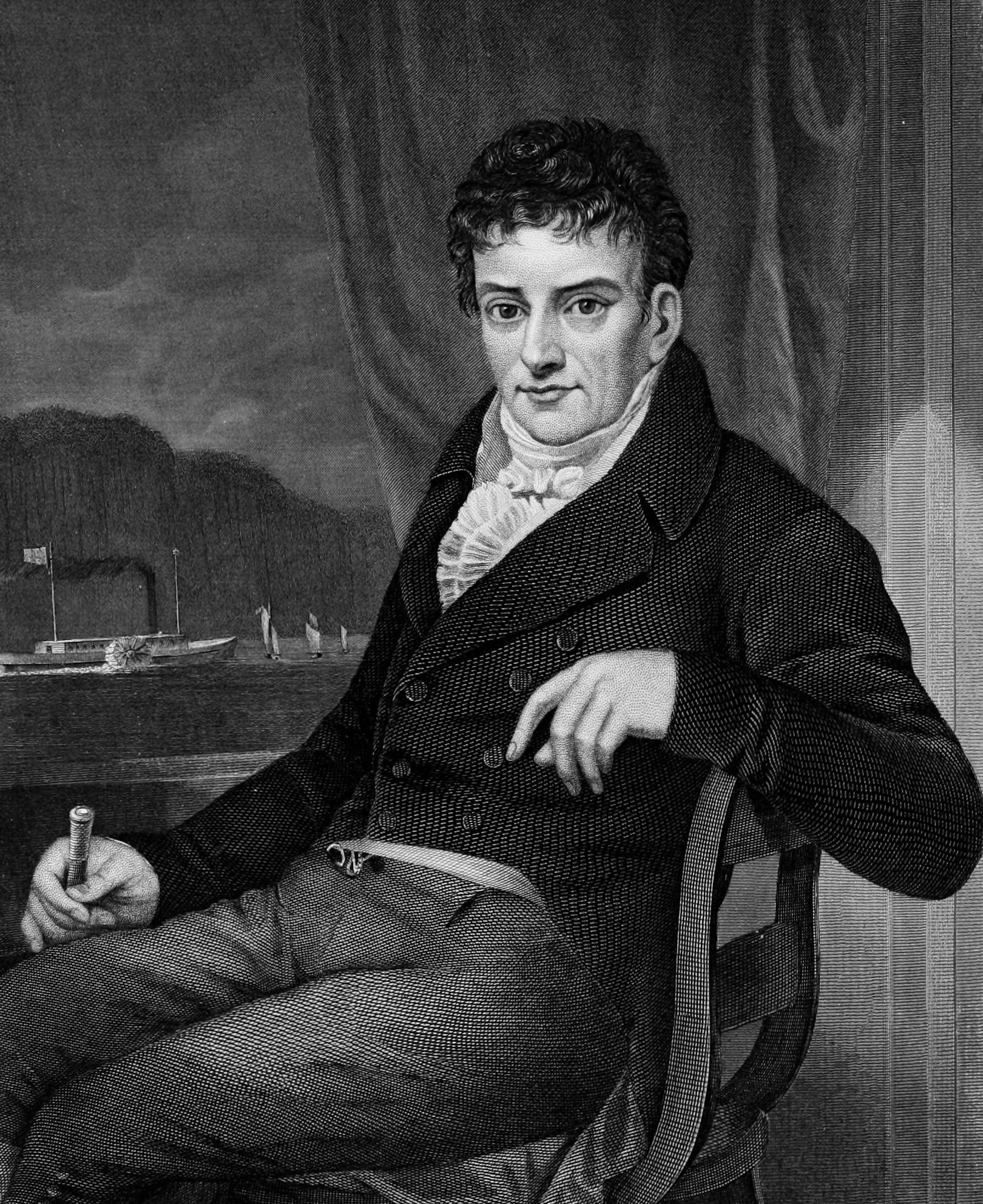
Robert Fulton (1765–1815)

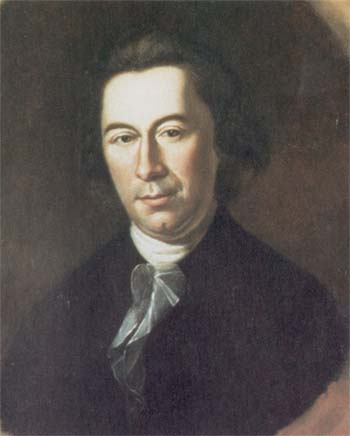
Robert Livingston (1746–1813)

New Orleans was part of a business venture among Robert Fulton (1765–1815), Robert R. Livingston (1746–1813), and Nicholas Roosevelt (1767–1854) to build and operate steamboats on America's western waters, including the Ohio and Mississippi rivers. Fulton had already successfully commercialized the use of the steamboat on the Hudson River above New York City with his North River Steamboat (often called Clermont) in 1807. In addition, Fulton became familiar with the Ohio River during a visit to Pittsburgh in 1786. Livingston was a wealthy New York politician and inventor who helped negotiate the Louisiana Purchase while minister to France from 1800 to 1804. Fulton and Livingston became partners and consulted with Nicholas Roosevelt, an inventor and expert on steamboats. Livingston's side-wheel design ended up being crucial to the success of their joint venture.

After Fulton and Livingston obtained U.S. industrial patents for their "steamboat" design, they hoped to increase their profits from the exclusive rights granted by the state governments of New York State and Louisiana to steam navigation on the Hudson and Mississippi Rivers. The two men realized the great potential for steamboat traffic on the western waters, and within twelve days of the completion of Clermont's first voyage, they began to plan for the introduction of a steamboat on the western rivers.

At the time, Roosevelt manufactured copper and steam engines at the Soho Works on the Passaic River at Belleville, New Jersey, one of the best foundries in the nation. Roosevelt had worked on a stern-wheel steamboat for Livingston from 1798 to 1800, but stopped when he lost his government contracts for supplying copper for warships.

In 1798, Roosevelt tried unsuccessfully to convince Livingston to use side-wheels in his designs, but Livingston insisted on a stern-wheel. However, after exhausting other options, Fulton and Livingston eventually used side-wheels on Clermont. The two men were also in Roosevelt's debt for originally training and employing many of Fulton's highly skilled workmen.

== Preparation and construction ==
As part of their plans for a steamboat voyage from Pittsburgh to New Orleans, Fulton and Livingston sent Roosevelt to Pittsburgh to explore, survey, and test the waters of the Ohio and Mississippi Rivers. In addition, Roosevelt had to locate supplies and coal deposits that could be mined and brought at a later time to the western rivers to fuel steam-powered boats. Roosevelt arrived in Pittsburgh in April or May 1809 with his young wife, Lydia, the daughter of his business partner, Benjamin H. Latrobe (1764–1820), noted British-American architect who was then Architect of the Capitol in Washington, D.C., with the United States Capitol construction then underway. According to a notation by Fulton, Roosevelt was paid $600 (equivalent to $12,400 in 2025) for an exploratory Mississippi River expedition on June 28, 1809. Roosevelt and his pregnant wife began a six-month journey in a flatboat (built on the Monongahela River above Pittsburgh) to explore the steamboat's intended route downriver on the Ohio-Mississippi route to New Orleans. Roosevelt carried letters of introduction to all the important people along the route (Cincinnati, Louisville, and Natchez were insignificant towns at that time and the only places of any importance), but none, least of all the pilots and boatmen, believed he could ever navigate the western waters with a steamboat. During this exploratory voyage, Roosevelt recorded depths and measured currents for later reference. Near the present-day town of Cannelton, Indiana, Roosevelt purchased property and arranged to have coal mined and moved to the banks of the Ohio River, where it would become a useful fuel source when the steamboat arrived later. After reaching New Orleans, near the Gulf of Mexico coast, on December 1, 1809, Roosevelt and his wife sailed home to New York, arriving on January 15, 1810.

After Roosevelt gave a favorable report to Fulton and Livingston, he returned with his wife and daughter to Pittsburgh in 1810 to oversee construction of the new steamboat. Because of the "Falls of the Ohio" with its shallows, rapids and rocky "white water" at Louisville, Kentucky, the entire length of the Ohio River could not be easily navigated by boat, so the partners planned to divide the western steamboat commerce into two sections, where one operated steamboats from Pittsburgh to the Falls at Louisville, and the other from Louisville downstream to New Orleans. Roosevelt, who intended to steam the new boat down the Ohio and Mississippi Rivers and put her into service at New Orleans, named her New Orleans, in honor of the city that would be her home port. Designed by Fulton, Roosevelt brought shipbuilders and mechanics from New York to build the steamboat on the banks of the Monongahela River, a short distance from its junction at "The Point" with the Allegheny River. The majority of the machinery for the boat was made in New York and hauled overland to Pittsburgh because the latter city did not have a local manufacturer with sufficient capacity to the work at the time. The boat's single cylinder, low pressure steeple engine, which was based on a James Watt, (1736–1819), and Matthew Boulton, (1728–1809), joint design, and its copper boiler were assembled by engineers William Robinson and Nicholas D. Baker and placed in its hold. Historians have debated whether New Orleans had a stern-wheel paddle or two side-wheel paddles, but evidence that The New Orleans was a side-wheeler rather than a stern-wheeler is supported by contemporary accounts, including the newspaper, "Louisiana Gazette and Advertiser" report on January 13, 1812, that noted it was detained by the breaking of "one'" of its wheels, and an account of the ship's sinking in 1814 that contained a reference to the "wheel on the larboard side". The pinewood used for planking was obtained from nearby forests and sent down the Monongahela River. Similar to other Fulton-designed steamboats, New Orleans also carried a mast, spars, and two sails as back-up, in case the steam engine failed or fuel ran short.

The most accurate estimates put New Orleans at 148 feet 6 inches (45.26 m) long, 32 feet 6 inches (9.91 m) wide, and 12 feet (3.7 m) deep, and measured 371 tons burden. Her size was considerably larger than the barges, then the largest craft on the rivers at the time, which rarely exceeded 100 feet (30 m) in length. On New Orleans, the cabins below the deck provided space for up to sixty passengers. The total cost of the construction was about $38,000, a considerable sum for that time. The boat, first launched on the Monongahela River in March 1811, took many months to complete. On her first test run, Roosevelt steamed the new boat down the Monongahela River to the Ohio River, then up the Allegheny River, where she reached a speed of 3 miles per hour (5 km/h), but stalled against a strong current.

== Maiden voyage ==
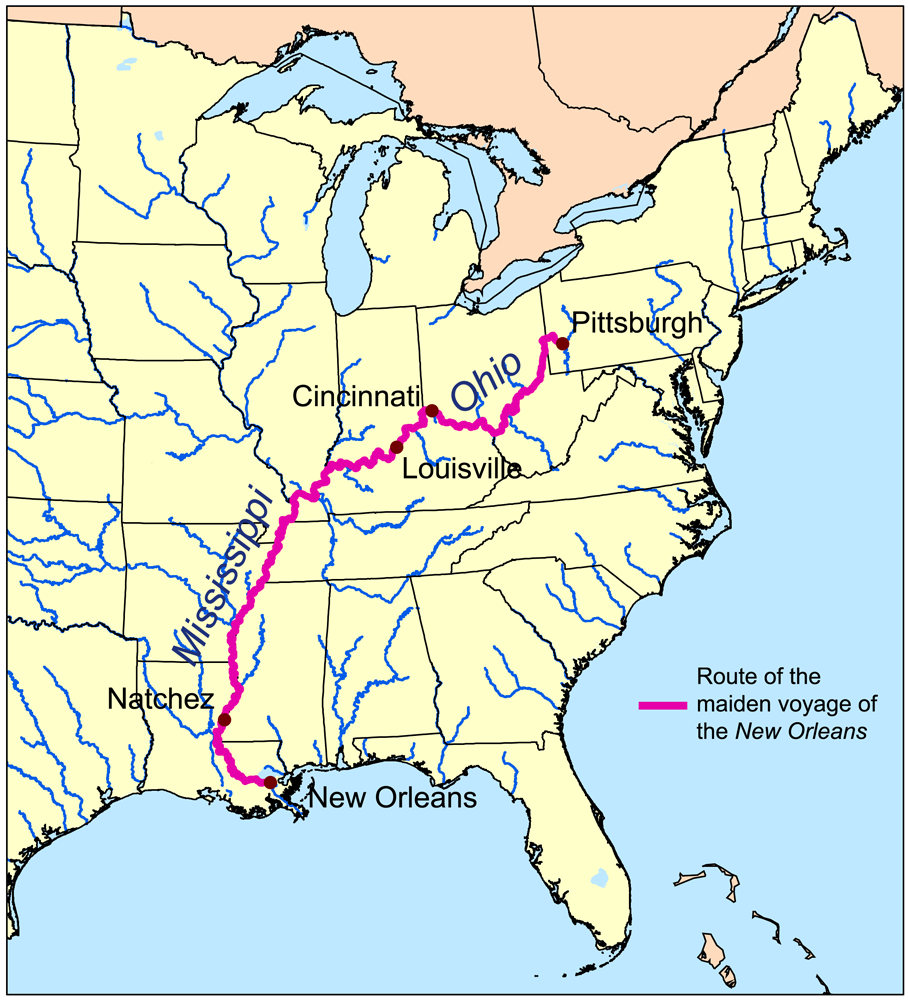
The route of the New Orleans

After a successful trial trip around Pittsburgh on 15 October 1811, New Orleans finally steamed for New Orleans on October 20, with Roosevelt as the captain and his pregnant wife and young daughter as passengers. The crew consisted of the engineer, Nicholas Baker; the pilot, Andrew Jack; six hands; two female servants for Mrs. Roosevelt; a waiter; a cook; and a Newfoundland dog named Tiger. The people of Pittsburgh turned out en masse to witness the departure of the steamboat. The first night Roosevelt and his wife were too excited to sleep and watched the shore, covered in almost unbroken forest, as it passed. The pilot was reassured about the chances of success by the boat's ease of steering and uniformly quick speed. The next morning, October 21, New Orleans was cheered by the villagers of Beaver, Pennsylvania. They had seen the boat approaching down a straight stretch of the river. During her first stop, at Wheeling, then on Virginia's northwestern point, Roosevelt welcomed crowds aboard the ship, charging them a twenty-five-cent fee for the opportunity and tour.

On October 27, when the boat passed Cincinnati, Ohio, the city's residents were disappointed she did not stop and thought they'd never see New Orleans again. After midnight on October 28 the boat arrived in Louisville, with a "shrill blast" from the steam engine and sparks flying from her smokestack, reminiscent of the "Great Comet of 1811" that arched in the sky at the same time. Here, local residents congratulated Roosevelt on his success, but told him they doubted they would ever see the boat again, because she would not be able to go upstream. To prove them wrong, and to recruit investors for Fulton's steam company, Roosevelt invited prominent citizens to a gala dinner aboard the boat. Once everyone was aboard, and much to their surprise, New Orleans headed upstream under her own power and completed a brief excursion before returning to Louisville. For the next month, Roosevelt waited for the waters of the Ohio River to rise enough for New Orleans to safely pass (with a draft of less than 6 in (15 cm)) over the treacherous "Falls of the Ohio". Roosevelt spent the extra time in the area making a brief trip upstream to Cincinnati before returning to Louisville to cross the Falls. On October 30, Roosevelt's second child, a son named Henry Latrobe Roosevelt, was born aboard the steamboat, near Louisville. After stopping at Shippingport for supplies and loading coal near present-day Cannelton, Indiana, which Roosevelt had arranged on his earlier trip to have mined and piled at the riverbank, the New Orleans continued her voyage downriver.

Although the trip on the Ohio River had been largely peaceful and easygoing, the passage of the Mississippi River was to be fraught with danger and uncertainty. As New Orleans passed the mouth of the Tennessee River, the crew saw Chickasaw Indian warriors, but experienced no violence. While fighting continued north of the Ohio River through the War of 1812, the Chickasaws remained peaceful allies of the Americans and declined to join forces with great warrior and chief, Tecumseh. Later, a fire broke out aboard ship after wood was left too close to the stove during the night, but it was quickly extinguished. Then, in mid-December, the first in a series of earthquakes struck the area, but the river's water cushioned New Orleans, allowing her to continue, undamaged by the quakes. On December 16, the famous New Madrid earthquake, which centered near New Madrid, Missouri, became one of the strongest North American earthquakes ever recorded; seismologists estimate it was 7.5 on the moment magnitude scale. The earthquake affected the journey by altering Mississippi River landmarks such as river islands and river channels that confused the pilot's visual navigation. At some small river towns, villagers begged to be taken aboard to escape the earthquake's desolation, but New Orleans lacked the provisions to feed the refugees and would have no more available until the boat reached Natchez, Mississippi, in late December 1811. At Natchez the crew met Zadok Cramer, author of "Navigator" river guide, who was eager for any new information about the geography of the river. Continuing on, the boat reached New Orleans on January 10, 1812. Following the trip, Roosevelt and his family returned to New York, where he took up other entrepreneurial ventures and discontinued his partnership with Fulton and Livingston. Soon, New Orleans was making regular runs between New Orleans and Natchez.

== Impact ==
The Mississippi, as I before wrote you, is conquered.

— Fulton in a letter to Joel Barlow

During the decades preceding the first voyage of New Orleans, and at an accelerated rate after the Louisiana Purchase in 1803, settlers arrived in the western lands via the Ohio and Mississippi Rivers. However, with no practical way to go upstream, trade was limited. To move upstream, one needed to either row laboriously at low speeds, push a boat with poles, or be pulled by men walking on shore with towlines. Otherwise, the return trip required a sea voyage from New Orleans to an eastern port and crossing the Appalachian Mountains to reach an inland departure point. New Orleans, which achieved a downstream speed of 8 to 10 miles per hour (13 to 16 km/h) and an upstream speed of 3 miles per hour (5 km/h), became the first of thousands of steamboats that converted river commerce from a one-way trip downstream to two-way traffic, opening the Mississippi River and Ohio River valleys to commercial trade. In her first year of business on the Mississippi River, between New Orleans and Natchez, New Orleans averaged $2,400 in receipts per trip, making the round trip about once every three weeks. Factoring in expenses, this amounted to a net gain of upwards of at least $20,000, which Cramer described as "a revenue superior to any other establishment in the United States". However, the public doubted that steam navigation could succeed, and it was still more expensive than other methods of river transport. As a result, carrying of freight on flatboats and keels actually increased. In addition, the riverbed was dotted with dangerous snags, gravel, and sandbars, and the "Falls of the Ohio" at Louisville effectively cut navigation into two sections. Eventually, the riverbed was cleared, and later the Louisville and Portland Canal was built, making it easier to travel the 981 miles (1,579 km) passage between Pittsburgh and the junction with the Mississippi River.

The arrival of New Orleans signaled the beginning of significant economic change along the inland rivers. Fulton and Livingston intended to have six boats running between the "Falls of the Ohio" and New Orleans and five between the Falls and Pittsburgh. On April 8, 1812, Fulton and Livingston secured, with the help of Livingston's brother, Edward, a New Orleans politician, the exclusive rights and concession to the use of steam navigation on the new Louisiana Territory's rivers for a period of 18 years, provided that they charge a freight rate of no more than three quarters of the rate already charged by non-steam-powered boats. After New Orleans began navigating the lower Mississippi River, Fulton and Livingston attempted to prevent other steamboats from using the river, until court decisions broke their monopoly on steamboat commerce in New York and Louisiana. As commercial shipping improved, land development also increased along the inland rivers below the "Falls of the Ohio" at Louisville.

Livingston and Fulton did not live long enough to see the long-term impact of New Orleans on the mid-western and western rivers. Livingston died in 1813 and Fulton in 1815, but Roosevelt retired to Skaneateles, New York, and died 39 years later in 1854, at the age of 87.

New Orleans was the first attempt in the rapid development of technology, which included more efficient steam engines, improvements in steamboat designed for western rivers, as well as lock and canal construction. After New Orleans, several steamboats were quickly built at Pittsburgh over the next couple of years, including Comet (1813), Vesuvius (1814), and Aetna. Around 1817, when there were twelve steamboats on the mid-western rivers, a skeptical public became convinced that steamboat navigation would work, and so within two years, there were over sixty steamboats on the western waters. By 1826, there were 143 steamboats on the river; a total of 233 had existed up to that time, despite the constant threat and dangers of overheated boiler explosions and wrecks from river obstructions.

== Sinking ==
New Orleans hit a snag, which punctured the hull, and she sank near Baton Rouge, Louisiana, on July 14, 1814, two years after her first historic trip, setting the pattern for the average lifespan of a Western Rivers steamboat of about three years.

Fulton's steamboat company moved the engine and machinery to a new hull, which they also named New Orleans, and she continued on the Natchez steamboat trade.
