= Daniel French (inventor) =

American inventor (1770–1853)

From a letter signed on July 5, 1804

Daniel French (1770–1853), a "Yankee" inventor, was born in Berlin, Connecticut. From an early age French strove to become a "mechanician," an artisan trained in the theory of mechanics and skilled in the working of metals at increasing levels of precision. His friend Oliver Evans, an accomplished engineer, described French as an "original and ingenious inventor." French's most significant invention was the horizontally mounted, high-pressure, non-condensing, directly connected steam engine for mills, boats, etc. French was awarded a patent for his steam engine in 1809. This type of engine became standard on the western steamboat.

In 1807 Robert Fulton placed on the Hudson River the steamboat North River (aka Clermont) which was powered by a low pressure Boulton and Watt steam engine. The heavy and inherently inefficient engine required an increase in the size, and hence the weight, of the steam cylinder for an increase in power. Mounting the cylinder vertically, Fulton "invented" a complex series of levers and cranks to transmit the power of the piston to each paddle wheel crank. Two paddle wheels, one on each side, were mounted midway between the bow and the stern. On the western rivers, Fulton's design was the standard for steamboats until the Enterprise which was designed by French.

Daniel French's steam engine and drive train were substantially different from Fulton's. By employing Oliver Evans' patented (1804) high-pressure steam principle, French increased the power of his engine. By omitting the condensing of steam French reduced problems with construction and also reduced the weight of his engine. He also eliminated the flywheel. The resulting engine was more powerful, lighter, and more efficient and was easier to construct and repair than the Boulton and Watt engine. Another important improvement French made was to mount his steam cylinder horizontally, level with the axis of the paddle wheel, and with the piston rod connected directly to the paddle wheel crank. As the crank rotated by the application of steam, the cylinder, which was mounted on trunnions, oscillated above and below the horizontal. Over the years, French's steam engine and drive train proved to be a significant improvement compared to Fulton's.

French successfully applied his engine to a steam ferry to cross the Hudson River, but was denied the Paulus Hook ferry lease by the legal monopoly of Fulton and Robert Livingston. French then established a ferry on the Delaware River between Philadelphia, Pennsylvania and Camden, New Jersey. After moving to Brownsville, Pennsylvania, French built, for the shareholders of the Monongahela and Ohio Steam Boat Company, the engine and drive train for the highly successful Enterprise, the first steamboat to ascend the Mississippi and Ohio Rivers from New Orleans to Louisville.

The steamboat Washington was built by George White at Wheeling, West Virginia, for Henry Shreve and partners. The engine and drive train were constructed by French at Brownsville. To power the 400-ton vessel, French cast and bored a steam cylinder larger than the one he used on the smaller Enterprise. The larger cylinder required a larger steam boiler which was placed on the Washington's main deck. Since the steam cylinder was too heavy for French's oscillating-type engine, he fixed it in a horizontal position below the main deck immediately forward of the stern paddle wheel. French connected the piston rod directly to the stern paddle wheel crank by means of a "pitman", to adjust for the crank's circular motion. To utilize the increased steam power French increased the width of the paddle wheel from six feet (as on the Enterprise) to twelve feet. With the highly successful Washington, French set a standard for powerful and swift steamboats.

== Gallery ==
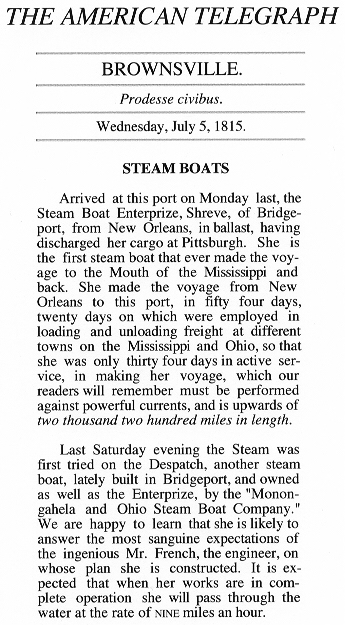
Enterprise completes her epic 2,200-mile voyage and Despatch is launched.

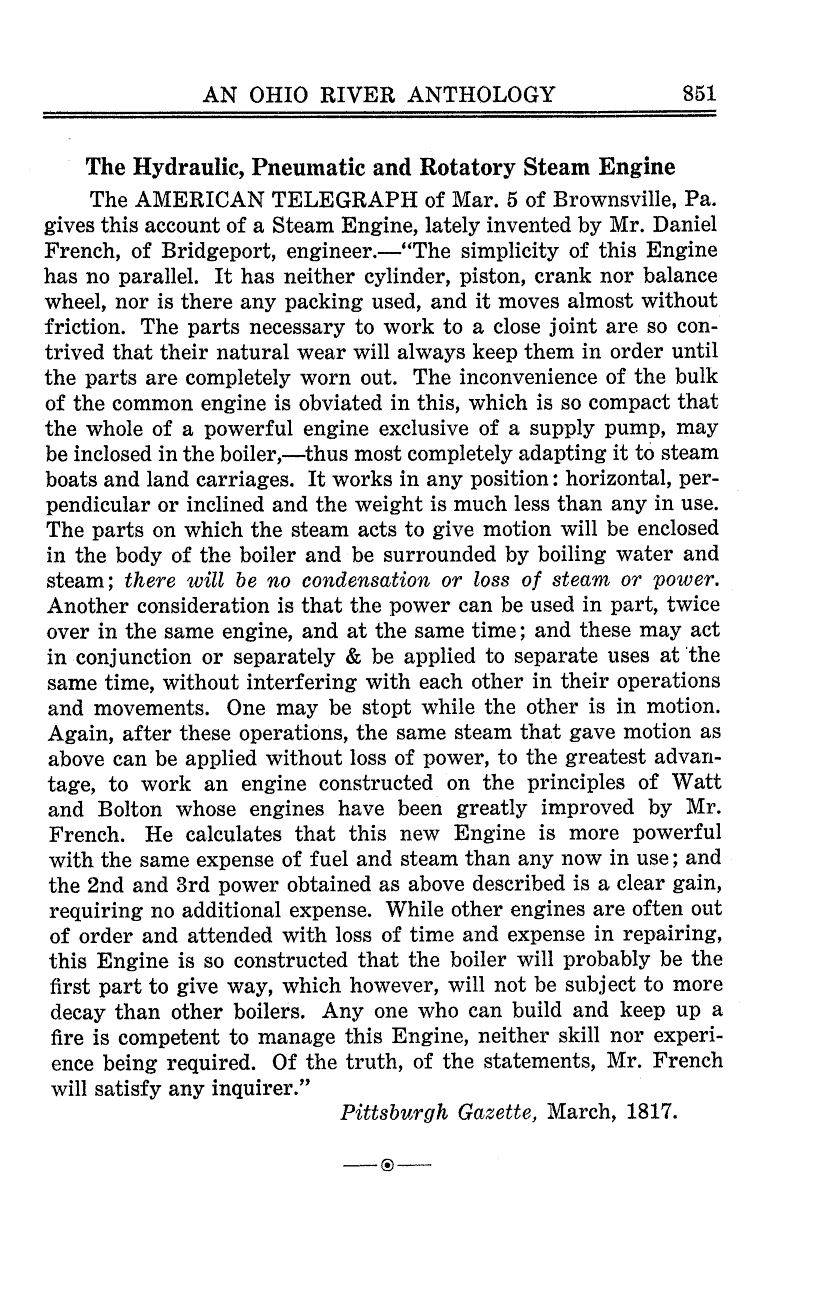
Daniel French's new steam engine.

== See also ==
- Experiment (horse-powered boat)
- Henry French House
