= Comet (1813 steamboat) =

Historic American steamboat

History

United States
- Name: Comet
- Owner: Daniel D. Smith
- Builder: The Comet was built and launched at Pittsburgh.; Daniel French designed and built the engine and power train at Brownsville.
- Laid down: Winter, 1813
- Launched: Spring, 1813
- In service: June, 1813
- Out of service: After July 3, 1814
- Fate: Decommissioned after engine was removed.
- Notes: Second steamboat to navigate the Ohio and Mississippi rivers.

General characteristics
- Length: 52 ft (15.8 m)
- Beam: 8 ft (2.4 m)
- Propulsion: One steam engine; One paddlewheel at stern

The steamboat Comet was the second steamboat to navigate the Ohio and Mississippi rivers. Comet's owner was Daniel D. Smith and she was launched in 1813 at Pittsburgh, Pennsylvania. With an engine and power train designed and built by Daniel French, the Comet was the first of the Western steamboats to be powered by a horizontal high-pressure engine with its piston rod connected to a stern paddle wheel. Smith was the first to defy the steamboat monopoly in Orleans Territory granted to Robert R. Livingston and Robert Fulton.

== Pittsburgh ==
Daniel French built Comet's steam engine and drive train at Brownsville, Pennsylvania, and installed them in the steamboat at Pittsburgh prior to July 13, 1813, her first voyage. The Pittsburgh Gazette announced that Comet had departed Pittsburgh for Louisville, Kentucky, on July 13:

"The Steam Boat COMET, lately built at this place by Mr. Smith, sailed on Tuesday last for Louisville, in Kentucky. She is intended as a regular packet between this place and the Falls of Ohio, and is handsomely fitted up for the accommodation of passengers."

On September 7, 1813, Robert Fulton wrote to John Livingston at Pittsburgh requesting specific information about the Comet. In October 1813 a public notice was published in The Pittsburgh Gazette:

"TO THE PUBLIC. FULTON & LIVINGSTON, have ordered a suit to be brought against Daniel French, and the owners of the Steam Boat COMET, for a violation of the essential part of their patent. When good boats, such as are now constructing in every part of the United States, can be built under Fulton and Livingston's undoubted patent rights, persons should be cautious of involving themselves in a labyrinth of expensive and tedious law suits. The infraction of their rights, in the State of New-York, cost a company their boats, damages and expenses, amounting to sixty thousand dollars, and was the ruin of many of the parties concerned. FULTON & LIVINGSTON. October 14, 1813"

On November 11, 1813, Fulton wrote to Livingston at Pittsburgh:

"As to Mr. Smith and his steam boat I must attack him where he does me damage there is no damage in making a steam boat the damage is in using her to the detriment of the original inventor"

No trial date was entered in the docket book at the Allegheny County Courthouse. Apparently, the threatened lawsuit was not pursued.

== New Orleans ==
After steaming from Pittsburgh to the port of New Orleans, the Comet was entered for the first time in the New Orleans Wharf Register on February 25, 1814. Payment of the wharfage fee, in the amount of "$6", for the "Steam Boat, Capt. Lake" was recorded. Subsequent entries in the New Orleans Wharf Register, on March 15, April 7, May 2 and July 3, 1814, identified the Comet as "Steam Boat (Lake)", with a wharfage fee of $6.
