= Enterprise (1814) =

Historic American steamboat

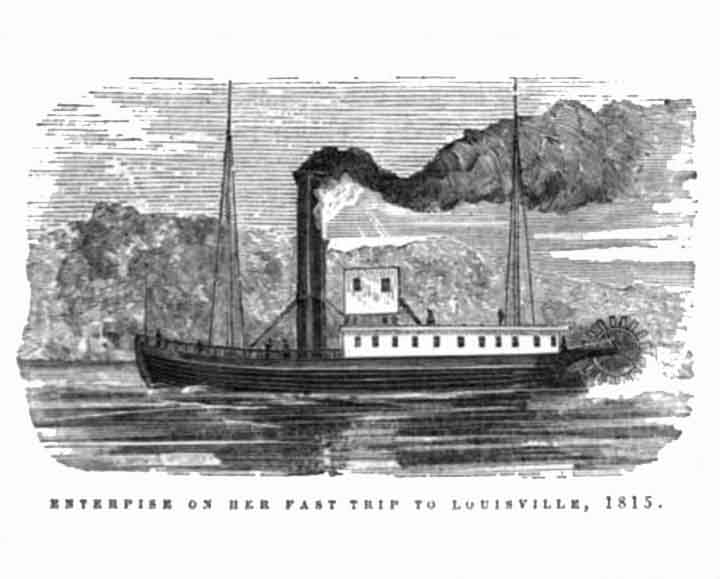
- Enterprise on her fast trip to Louisville, 1815

History

United States
- Name: Enterprise, or Enterprize
- Owner: Monongahela and Ohio Steam Boat Co., Brownsville, Pennsylvania
- Builder: Daniel French designed and built the engine and powertrain.
- Laid down: Fall, 1813
- Launched: May 1814
- In service: June 7, 1814
- Out of service: After August 5, 1816
- Fate: Sank at Rock Harbor, Rock Island, Ohio River next to Shippingport, Kentucky.
- Notes: The steamboat Enterprise demonstrated for the first time by her epic 2,200-mile voyage from New Orleans to Brownsville, Pennsylvania that steamboat commerce was practical on the Mississippi River and its tributaries.

General characteristics
- Length: 60–70 ft (18.3–21.3 m)
- Beam: 15 ft (4.6 m)
- Draft: 2.5 ft (0.8 m), light ship
- Propulsion: One steam engine; One sternwheel, 8 feet in diameter; Two masts equipped with sails
- Armament: Gun located on the bow for saluting

The steamboat Enterprise demonstrated for the first time by her epic 2,200-mile (3,500 km) voyage from New Orleans to Brownsville, Pennsylvania, that steamboat commerce was practical on the Mississippi River and its tributaries.

== Early days ==
The Enterprise, or Enterprize, with an engine and power train designed and built by Daniel French, was launched before June 1814 at Brownsville for her owners: the shareholders of the Monongahela and Ohio Steam Boat Company. The Enterprise, under the command of Israel Gregg, was first used to transport passengers and cargo to ports between Brownsville and Louisville, Kentucky. From June to December she completed two 600-mile (970 km) voyages from Louisville to Pittsburgh that were performed against strong river currents. With these voyages the Enterprise demonstrated for the first time that steamboat commerce was practical on the Ohio River.

== Voyage to New Orleans ==
On December 2, General Andrew Jackson had marched from Mobile, Alabama, to New Orleans with orders to oppose an imminent military invasion by an overwhelming British force. Jackson had been making frequent requests for military supplies, especially small firearms and ammunition, that were in short supply. To this end, the shareholders made the decision to send the Enterprise. Command was transferred to Henry Miller Shreve, a Brownsville resident and experienced keelboat captain, who had firsthand knowledge of the hazards to navigation of the Ohio and Mississippi Rivers. On December 21, 1814, the Enterprise departed Pittsburgh bound for New Orleans with a cargo of "Cannon-balls, Gun-Carriages, Smith's Tools, Boxes of Harness, &c". On December 28, the Enterprise passed the Falls of the Ohio at Louisville, delivering the cargo of military supplies at the port of New Orleans on January 9, 1815.

== Battle of New Orleans ==
Under normal circumstances, the voyage by the Enterprise into Louisiana's waters would have been a violation of the territorial steamboat monopoly granted to Robert R. Livingston and Robert Fulton. However, the Enterprise was protected from the monopolists and free to navigate the state's waters by the martial law imposed by General Andrew Jackson on December 16.

Despite the military supplies delivered by the Enterprise, Jackson's forces were still in dire need, particularly for small firearms, gunpowder and shot. Responding to reports that several boats laden with military supplies were near Natchez, Jackson sent the Enterprise. The boats were located and the Enterprise took them in tow, delivering them to New Orleans.

Then the Enterprise made another voyage to Natchez and returned to the port of New Orleans by February 12, 1815, when she was entered for the first time in the New Orleans Wharf Register as "Steam Boat (le petit) Captne Shrive".

Then the Enterprise steamed up the Red River to Alexandria with 250 troops in tow and returned to New Orleans.

== Voyage to Brownsville ==
On February 4, 1815, the British fleet, with all of the troops aboard, set sail for Mobile Bay. On February 16, the United States Senate ratified the Treaty of Ghent, finally putting an end to the War of 1812. However, official dispatches announcing the peace would not reach New Orleans until late February.

On March 1, Shreve advertised in a Natchez newspaper that the Enterprise would "ply between Natchez and New Orleans every nine days until the first week in May" when the Enterprise would depart New Orleans for Louisville. On March 13, Andrew Jackson rescinded martial law. On April 21, payment of the wharfage fee for the Enterprise was recorded.

On May 1, John Livingston submitted a petition to the Federal Court accusing captain Henry Shreve and the shareholders of the Monongahela and Ohio Steam Boat Company of violating the territorial steamboat monopoly granted to Robert R. Livingston and Robert Fulton. John Livingston's petition requested a payment of $5,000 and the forfeiture of the Enterprise. Sheriff John H. Holland, acting on orders issued by the court, quickly arrested Henry Shreve and seized the Enterprise. On May 2, attorney Abner L. Duncan, representing the shareholders of the Monongahela and Ohio Steam Boat Company, posted bail and made arrangements for Shreve and the Enterprise to be released.

On May 6, Shreve and the Enterprise finally departed New Orleans and, after a voyage of 1,500 miles, reached Louisville on May 31. The Enterprise was the first steamboat to reach Louisville from New Orleans. Then the Enterprise steamed to Pittsburgh and Brownsville. This voyage, a distance of 2,200 miles (3,500 km) from New Orleans, was performed against the powerful currents of the Mississippi, Ohio and Monongahela rivers. The importance of this voyage was expressed in newspapers throughout the West.

== Second Voyage to New Orleans ==
In August and autumn of 1815, Captain Lowns, having replaced Captain Shreve, commanded the Enterprise during voyages to Ohio River ports between Pittsburgh and Louisville.

In November 1815, the Monongahela and Ohio Steam Boat Co. leased the Enterprise to shareholder James Tomlinson for $2,000. Tomlinson's son-in-law, Daniel Wehrley (or Worley), became the captain of the Enterprise. Bound for New Orleans the Enterprise arrived at Shippingport in grand style on January 21, 1816. On January 25, the Enterprise "with a full cargo of flour, whiskey, apples, &c. and a number of passengers" departed Shippingport bound for New Orleans. The Enterprise reached the port of New Orleans by February 27. Then the Enterprise completed a roundtrip voyage when she returned to the port of New Orleans by April 5.

== Enterprise trial at New Orleans ==
The Dispatch, owned as well as the Enterprise by the Monongahela and Ohio Steam Boat Company, steamed from Brownsville to Louisville under the command of Israel Gregg. At Louisville command was transferred to Henry Bruce who navigated the Dispatch to the port of New Orleans by February 13, 1816. While docked at the landing, an incident occurred aboard the Dispatch that Robert Rogers, the first engineer, would chronicle in his autobiography:

"We arrived early in the spring, and soon after we landed at the Levee. Edward Livingston, together with the Marshall of the district, with some others came on board, and informed our captain that they (Fulton and Livingston) had the exclusive right to navigate the waters in Louisiana with steam-boats, granted to them by the Legislature of Louisiana and they did not allow their rights infringed; but as we plead ignorance of the law, they agreed if we would leave the State with our boat, and not return, they would not prosecute us. We then took in a little freight and a few passengers and started for Alexandria at the Rapids of the Red River, and after discharging our cargo, we returned to the mouth of the river; then took up the Mississippi for Pittsburg."

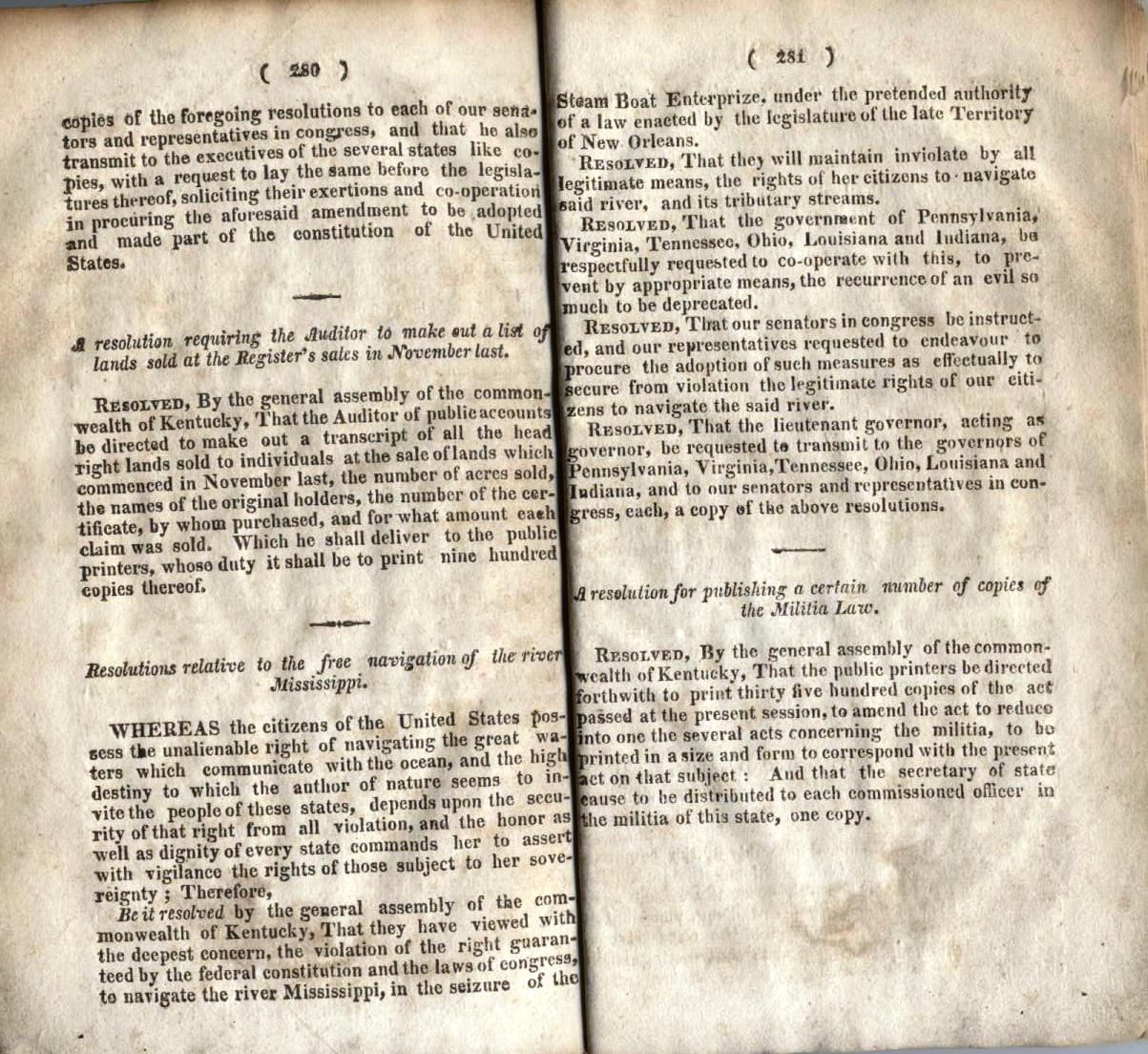
1817 Enterprise Resolution by Kentucky legislature

Accounts of this incident were published in newspapers throughout the West. Furthermore, during January 1817 the Kentucky legislature responded to the seizures of the Enterprise and the Dispatch by passing a resolution.

Documents for the impending Enterprise trial, having been transported aboard the Dispatch, were delivered to defense attorney Abner L. Duncan. On February 14, Duncan submitted his "Supplemental answer to the Judge of the District Court for the First Judicial District of the State of Louisiana".

During May 1816, the Enterprise trial, judge Dominic A. Hall presiding, was held in the old Spanish courthouse, 919 Royal Street. The plaintiffs were represented by John R. Grymes, the defendants by Abner L. Duncan. Duncan submitted to the court Daniel French's 1809 federal patent for his improved steamboat engine, that powered the Enterprise. Duncan argued that this federal patent protected all of the defendants – French, Shreve and the shareholders of the Monongahela and Ohio Steam Boat Co. – from the charges by the monopolists. On May 20, Judge Hall, stating that the Territorial Legislature had exceeded its authority in granting the steamboat monopoly, dismissed the petition of the plaintiffs. A letter announcing the news of Judge Hall's decision and proclaiming its significance to the growth of steamboat commerce and the economy of the West was published in a Louisville newspaper.

== Final voyage ==
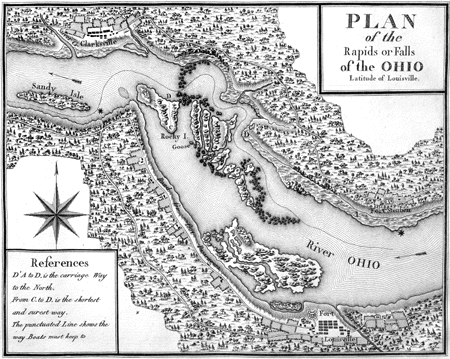
c. 1796 map showing Rocky I. where Rock Harbor was located

Steaming from New Orleans under the command of Daniel Wehrley the Enterprise reached Shippingport by August 5, 1816. Because the Ohio River above the Falls was too shallow for the voyage to continue, the Enterprise was anchored in Rock Harbor.

Historian Thomas Shourds utilized firsthand information provided by Elisha Hunt, the principal founder and shareholder of the Monongahela and Ohio Steam Boat Company, to chronicle the final days of the Enterprise:

"The Enterprise finally reached Shippins Port, below the Falls of the Ohio river, and the river being low above, and freights dull, the Captain anchored the boat in deep water, and hiring two men to take care of her, went by land to Pittsburg. One of the men went ashore and the other got drunk and neglected the pumps, the weather was hot, the seams of the boat opened, and the Enterprise filled and sank to the bottom, where, as Elisha Hunt, in a letter written in the year 1851, says 'she still is.' Elisha further states that while he was down in Kentucky, in 1818, a man offered him $1,000 for the wreck, as he thought he could get her engine out to run a saw mill."

During August or early autumn of 1816, the Enterprise, while safely anchored in Rock Harbor, "filled and sank to the bottom" where, in the words of Elisha Hunt, "she still is."

== Legacy ==
The Enterprise demonstrated for the first time that steamboat commerce was practical on the Mississippi River and its tributaries. In addition, the Enterprise trial eliminated the ability of the monopolists to restrict competition. The Enterprise was relatively inexpensive to build, reportedly costing $9,000 compared to $38,000 for the New Orleans.

The Enterprise, due to the sternwheel design, had the option to transport cargo or passengers by tying a barge alongside her hull. Since a barge could be loaded and unloaded independently, no time was spent loading or unloading the steamboat. Furthermore, a loaded barge could be picked up or delivered at places on the river that were not typical loading docks. Also, unlike cargo or passengers added to the Enterprise, the addition of a loaded barge would not increase her draft.

These factors contributed to the subsequent rapid growth of steamboat commerce on America's western rivers.

== Gallery ==
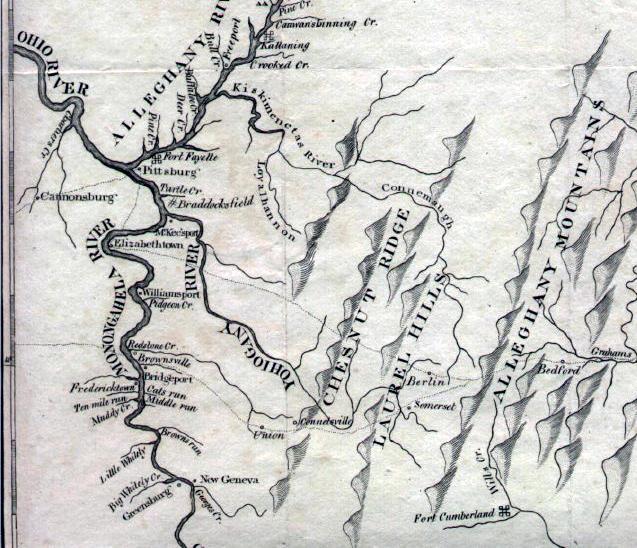
1803 map of western Pennsylvania
