= 1795 in poetry =

List of years in poetry	(table)
- … 1785; 1786; 1787; 1788; 1789; 1790; 1791; 1792; 1793; 1794; 1795; 1796; 1797; 1798; 1799; 1800; 1801; 1802; 1803; 1804; 1805 …
- In literature 1792 1793 1794 1795 1796 1797 1798
- Art; Archaeology; Architecture; Literature; Music; Philosophy; Science; +...

Nationality words link to articles with information on the nation's poetry or literature (for instance, Irish or France).

== Events ==
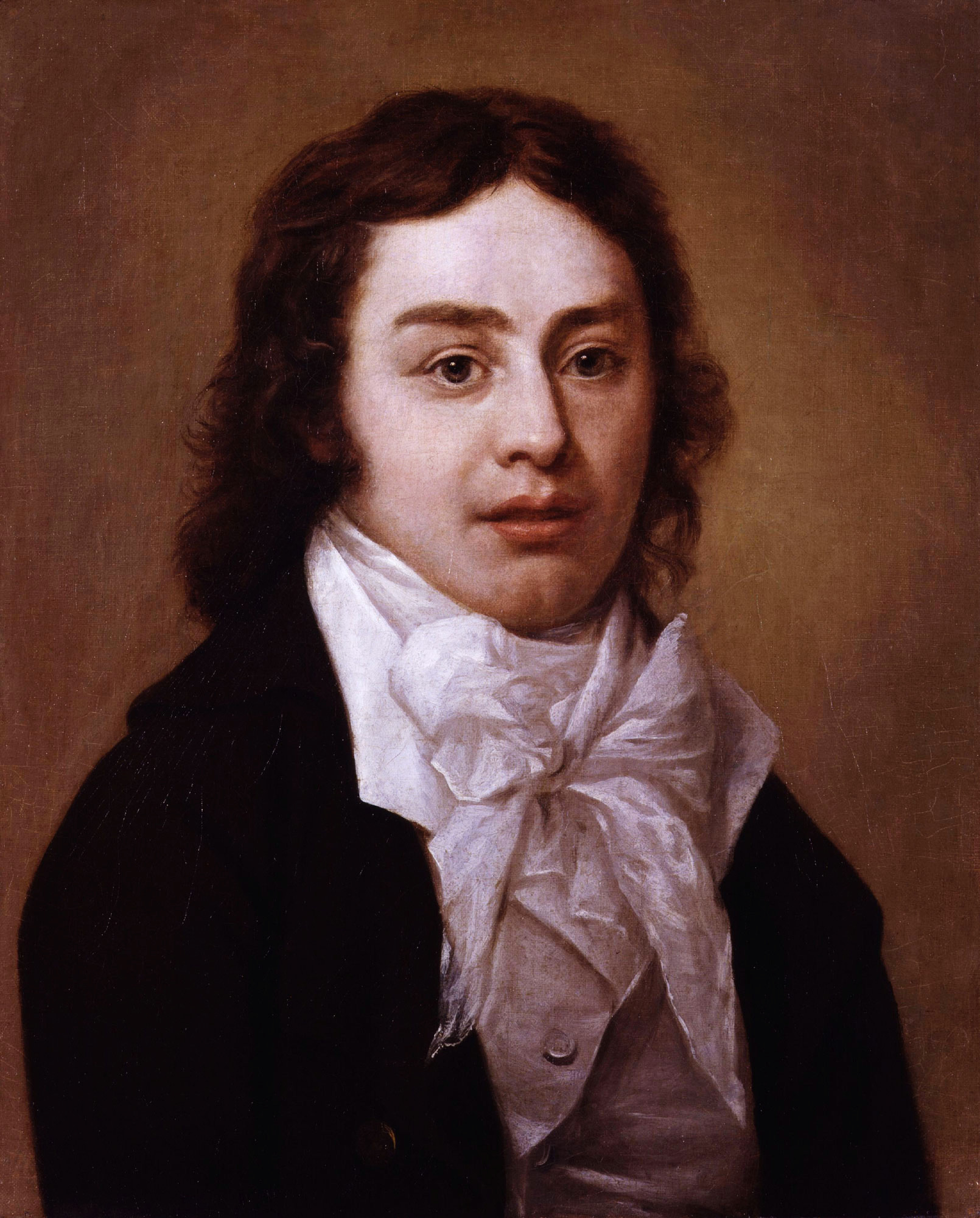
Samuel Taylor Coleridge in 1795, by Peter Vandyke

- June 27 – Mary Robinson writes the poem January, 1795. This year she also writes London's Summer Morning (published 1800).
- August 21–September 26 – English poet William Wordsworth and his sister Dorothy stay at 7 Great George Street, Bristol, during which time they meet Samuel Taylor Coleridge, Robert Southey and the latter poets' publisher Joseph Cottle.
- October 4 – Coleridge marries Sara Fricker at St Mary Redcliffe, Bristol. On November 14, Southey marries Sara's sister Edith in the same church.

== Works published ==
=== United Kingdom ===
- William Blake, Prophetic books:
  - The Book of Ahania, illuminated book with five intaglio plates; one known copy
  - The Book of Los, illuminated book with five intaglio plates
  - The Song of Los, illuminated book with 8 plates, five known copies
- Samuel Taylor Coleridge, Sonnets on Eminent Characters, also known as Sonnets on Eminent Contemporaries, a series of 11 sonnets published in the Morning Chronicle from December 1, 1794 to January 29, this year; these three were published this year:
  - To William Godwin, Author of Political Justice (William Godwin); published January 10
  - To Robert Southey, of Baliol College, Oxford, Author of the 'Retrospect,' and Other Poems (Robert Southey); published January 14
  - To Richard Brinsley Sheridan, Esq. (Richard Brinsley Sheridan); published January 29
- Joseph Cottle, published anonymously, Poems
- Ann Batten Cristall, Poetical Sketches
- William Drennan, Erin
- William Hayley, The National Advocates
- Walter Savage Landor:
  - Published anonymously, Moral Epistle to Lord Stanhope
  - The Poems of Walter Savage Landor, suppressed by the author
- Joseph Ritson, editor, Robin Hood: A Collection of all the Ancient Poems
- Mary Robinson, Poems, by Mrs. Mary Robinson. A New Edition
- Robert Southey and Robert Lovell, Poems
- John Thelwall, Poems Written in Close Confinement in the Tower and Newgate, the author was arrested in 1794 and sent to the Tower of London

=== United States ===
- Philip Morin Freneau, Poems Written Between the Years 1768 and 1794, 287 poems, including previously unpublished work and revised poems (omitting Latin mottoes, for instance, in order to communicate better with a broader group of readers); he published the work on his own printing press, but although he and the booksellers had high hopes for it, the reception is poor
- Robert Treat Paine, Jr., "The Invention of Letters" commencement verse delivered at Harvard University; described the history of thought, eulogized Washington and attacked Jacobins
- Isaac Story, Liberty
- Charles Pinkney Sumner, The Compass

== Births ==
Death years link to the corresponding "[year] in poetry" article:

- August 7 – Joseph Rodman Drake (died 1820), American whose poetry is first published posthumously in 1835
- August 30 – Amable Tastu (Sabine Casimire Amable Voïart) (died 1885), French women of letters and poet
- September 15 – James Gates Percival (died 1856), American poet and geologist
- September 29 (September 18 O.S.) – Kondraty Ryleyev (hanged 1826), Russian poet and revolutionary
- October 12 – Janet Hamilton, née Thomson (died 1873), Scottish poet and essayist
- October 31 – John Keats (died 1821), English Romantic lyric poet
- December 4 – Thomas Carlyle (died 1881), Scottish satirical writer, essayist, historian, teacher and critic
- Also – George Darley (died 1846), Irish poet, novelist and critic

== Deaths ==
Death years link to the corresponding "[year] in poetry" article:

- February 11 – Carl Michael Bellman (born 1740), Swedish poet and songwriter
- April 22 – Tadhg Gaelach Ó Súilleabháin (born 1715), Irish poet
- July 31 – Basílio da Gama, writing as Termindo Sipílio (born 1740), Brazilian Jesuit and epic poet
- August 20 – William Jones (born 1726), Welsh radical, poet and antiquary
- September 22 – Sayat-Nova (born 1712), Armenian musician and poet, executed
- September 30 – George Butt (born 1741), English chaplain and poet
- November 17 – Samuel Bishop (born 1731), English poet, essayist and schoolmaster
- Also – Hedvig Sirenia (born 1734), Swedish poet

== See also ==
- Poetry
