= 1794 in literature =

This article contains information about the literary events and publications of 1794.

== Events ==
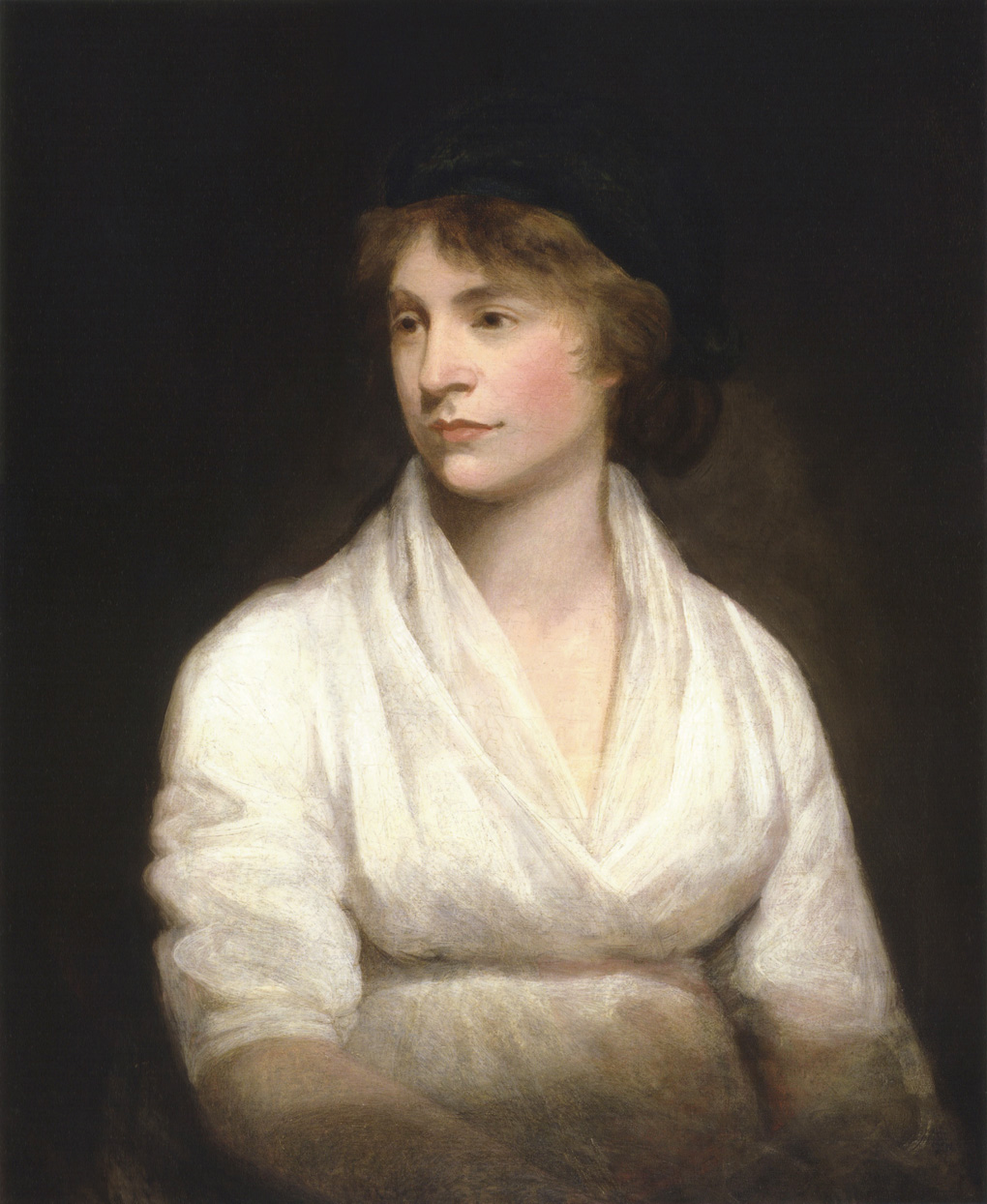
Mary Wollstonecraft by John Opie (c. 1797)

- March 12 – The rebuilt Theatre Royal, Drury Lane, in London, designed by Henry Holland, opens to the public.
- May 12 – William Godwin's novel Things as They Are; or, The Adventures of Caleb Williams is published in London as an attack on tyrannical government. Godwin intended it as a call to end the abuse of power, and as a popularisation of the ideas presented in his 1793 treatise Political Justice. The novel demonstrates that legal and other institutions can and do destroy individuals, even when the people who the justice system touches are innocent of any crime. This reality, in Godwin's mind, was therefore a description of "things as they are". The novel is classified as one of the best examples of the "victim-of-society story". The original manuscript included a preface that was removed from publication, because its content alarmed the booksellers of the time.
- May 14 – Mary Wollstonecraft's daughter by the American speculator Gilbert Imlay, Fanny, is born in Le Havre. Fanny is named after the English illustrator Fanny Blood, her mother's closest friend. Although Imlay never married Wollstonecraft, he registered her as his wife at the American consulate to protect her once Britain and France went to war in February 1793. Most people, including Wollstonecraft's sisters, assumed they were married—and thus, by extension, that Fanny was legitimate. Fanny was registered as a legitimate child in France, instead of being born out of wedlock.
- June – The English poets Samuel Taylor Coleridge and Robert Southey first meet, in Oxford while Coleridge is en route for a tour of Wales. They meet again in Bristol in August (where they also meet local poet Robert Lovell and his sisters-in-law, who they will marry; he also introduces them to the publisher Joseph Cottle). After Maximilien Robespierre's execution in July, they collaborate on the historical drama The Fall of Robespierre, published in October. The work was published in October 1794 by Benjamin Flower. Five hundred copies were printed and circulated in Bath, Cambridge, and London, which brought the writers fame while their personal relationship grew tense.Southey's first published poetry appears and he also writes the radical play Wat Tyler this summer.
- August – Ludwig Tieck graduates from the University of Göttingen and begins a literary career.
- Autumn–December – English playwright Thomas Holcroft is indicted for treason as a member of the Society for Constitutional Information and held in Newgate Prison, London, but released without charge.
- November 14 – The first recorded meeting of the Franklin Literary Society is held at Canonsburg Academy (modern-day Washington & Jefferson College) in Pennsylvania.

== New books ==
=== Fiction ===
- Jane Austen - Lady Susan (written)
- Giorgio Ferrich – Fabulae ab Illyricis adagiis disumptae
- William Godwin – Caleb Williams
- Elizabeth Gunning – The Packet
- Karl Friedrich Kahlert (under the pseudonym Lawrence Flammenberg) translated and adapted by Peter Teuthold – The Necromancer; or, The Tale of the Black Forest
- Xavier de Maistre – Voyage autour de ma chambre
- Ann Radcliffe – The Mysteries of Udolpho
- Mary Robinson – The Widow; or, A Picture of Modern Times
- Susanna Rowson – Charlotte Temple (first American edition)
- Thomas Spence – A Description of Spensonia

=== Children ===
- Elizabeth Pinchard – The Two Cousins

=== Drama ===
- Samuel Taylor Coleridge and Robert Southey – The Fall of Robespierre
- Hannah Cowley – The Town Before You
- Richard Cumberland
  - The Jew
  - The Box-Lobby Challenge
- Elizabeth Inchbald – The Wedding Day
- Henry James Pye – The Siege of Meaux
- François Juste Marie Raynouard – Caton d'Utique
- Frederick Reynolds –The Rage
- Mary Robinson – Nobody: A Comedy in Two Acts

=== Poetry ===
- William Blake – Songs of Experience
- Isabella Kelly – Collection of Poems and Fables

=== Non-fiction ===
- Edward Bancroft – Experimental Researches Concerning the Philosophy of Permanent Colours
- Erasmus Darwin – Zoonomia; or the Laws of Organic Life
- Elizabeth Dawbarn (anonymously) – Dialogue between Clara Neville and Louisa Mills, on Loyalty
- Edward Gibbon – Memoirs of My Life and Writings
- Deen Mahomed – The Travels of Dean Mahomet (first book published in English by an Indian)
- Thomas James Mathias – The Pursuits of Literature
- Thomas Paine – The Age of Reason
- William Paley – View of the Evidences of Christianity
- Uvedale Price – Essay on the Picturesque, As Compared with the Sublime and The Beautiful
- Patrick Russell – Natural History of Aleppo (sometimes seen as 2nd ed. of Alexander Russell's eponymous 1756 work)
- Walter Whiter – Specimen of a Commentary on Shakspeare

== Births ==
- January 11 – Jean Philibert Damiron, French philosopher (died 1862)
- May 17 – Anna Brownell Jameson, Irish-born essayist, travel writer and editor (died 1860)
- May 24 – William Whewell, English polymath (died 1866)
- August 16 – Jean-Henri Merle d'Aubigné, Swiss historian of the Reformation (died 1872)
- September 15 – Rosine de Chabaud-Latour, French religious thinker and translator (died 1860)

Uncertain date

- Emma Roberts, English travel writer and poet (died 1840)

== Deaths ==
- January 16 – Edward Gibbon, English historian (born 1737)
- March 5 – Ramón de la Cruz, Spanish dramatist (born 1731)
- March 24 – Jacques Hébert, French radical journalist (guillotined, born 1757)
- April 5 – Susanna Blamire, English dialect poet and songwriter (born 1747)
- April 13 – Nicolas Chamfort, French wit (suicide, born 1741)
- April 15 – Fabre d'Églantine, French dramatist and poet (guillotined, born 1750)
- April 27 – Sir William Jones, English philologist (born 1746)
- June 3 – Girolamo Tiraboschi, Italian literary critic (born 1731)
- June 8 – Gottfried August Bürger, German poet (born 1747)
- July 25
  - André Chénier, French poet (guillotined, born 1762)
  - Jean-Antoine Roucher, French poet (guillotined, born 1745)
- August 14 – George Colman the Elder, English dramatist and essayist (born 1732)
- November 16 – Rudolf Erich Raspe, German writer (born 1736)

== Sources ==
- Gregory, Allene (1915). The French Revolution and the English novel. The Knickerbocker Press.
- Holmes, Richard. Footsteps: Adventures of a Romantic Biographer. New York: Viking, 1985. ISBN 0-670-32353-5.
- Holmes, Richard. Coleridge. New York: Pantheon Books, 1989.
- Todd, Janet. Death & the Maidens: Fanny Wollstonecraft and the Shelley Circle. Berkeley: Counterpoint, 2007. ISBN 978-1-58243-339-4; (NB "Fanny Wollstonecraft" here = Fanny Imlay).
- Todd, Janet. Mary Wollstonecraft: A Revolutionary Life. London: Weidenfeld and Nicolson, 2000. ISBN 0-231-12184-9.
- Tomalin, Claire. The Life and Death of Mary Wollstonecraft. Rev. ed. New York: Penguin, 1992. ISBN 0-14-016761-7.
