= Joan of Arc (poem) =

Poem by Robert Southey

- by Robert Southey
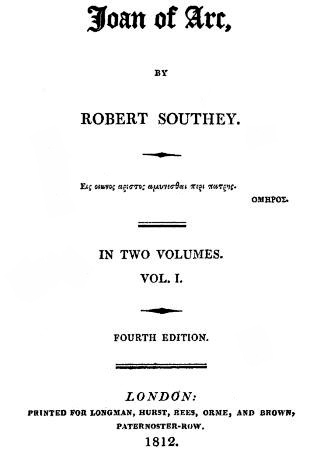
- Title page of the fourth edition, 1812
- Written: 1796

Joan of Arc is a 1796 epic poem composed by Robert Southey. The idea for the story came from a discussion between Southey and a friend of his, when Southey realised that the story would be suitable for an epic. The subject further appealed to Southey because the events of the French Revolution were concurrent to the writing of the poem and could serve as a parallel to current events. Eventually, Samuel Taylor Coleridge helped rewrite parts of the poem for a 1798 edition. Later editions removed Coleridge's additions along with other changes.

The poem is divided into two-halves with the first describing Joan of Arc's quest to meet Charles, Dauphin of France. Eventually, she is capable of gaining the Dauphin's support and begins to lead the French army. The secondary half describes the French victory at the siege of Orléans. Following several victories, the poem ends with Charles being crowned King of France. Joan of Arc served as a way for Southey to express his views on history and politics; these include his republican ideals, his claims that political tyranny was common throughout Europe, and his opposition to Christian practices that he thought were superstitious. Later editions of the poem shifted from a promotion of a deistic view of religion to a more traditional view. Critics gave the work mixed reviews, with some emphasising the quality of the images and themes of the poem. However, others believed that the poem lacked merit and some believed that the subject matter was inappropriate to the time. Many critics felt that Southey rushed in composing the work and did not devote enough time to it.

== Background ==
In July 1793, Southey discussed the story of Joan of Arc with Grosvenor Bedford, a friend of his. The conversation led to him believe that Joan of Arc would serve as a good basis for an epic so he began to work a plan for the poem and started composing lines. The subject of the poem appealed to Southey because it reflected incidents surrounding the French Revolution that started in early 1793. By 8 August, he had around 300 lines of the poem written. On 13 August, he devoted his time to writing a 12-book poem that he hoped to complete by the end of September. After admitting this desire for haste in the preface to the poem's first edition, critics accused Southey of not spending enough time on composing the poem. During Summer 1794, Southey attempted to find a publisher for John of Arc while taking up The Fall of Robespierre, a poetic drama about the French Revolution, with Samuel Taylor Coleridge.

During 1794, Southey began to plan with Coleridge and others about a political system that they would start in America called Pantisocracy. He needed to get money for the project and he contacted Richard Cruttwell on 19 July 1794 to publish Joan of Arc for that end. After notifying Bedford about the plan, Bedford advised Southey to contact William Nicol, a London publisher, to publish the work and raise more money. Southey did find a publisher, Joseph Cottle, to print his poem. A notification for the publication of Joan of Arc was included in a publication of Southey's poems later in 1794, but the edition was stopped from being printed since it lacked the minimum of 50 subscribers to pay for the cost. The poem was finally published by Cottle in 1796 (see 1796 in poetry) after changes to the text including a section added by Coleridge. The second edition would later be printed without Coleridge's lines and they were instead published on their own. For the second edition, Southey revised many lines and added more research to the work. It was printed in May 1798. Later editions were published in 1806, 1812, and 1837, with the final one further toning down Southey's republican sentiment.

== Poem ==
Of the various versions and changes, the 1798 version is the most regular of the editions. The story describes Joan from her first appearance at Vaucouleurs until the Dauphin Charles VII is crowned at Rheims. The rest of the events are described in flashbacks throughout the first half. As the story begins, an 18-year-old Joan travels to Vaucouleurs, home of Robert de Baudricourt, with her uncle Claude. She arrives searching for the Dauphin and meets Charles Dunois as the general tries to raise troops for France's defence. He helps her through Lorraine to Chinon while explaining her background and life's story to the general. She tells of her family and her natural living. The effects of the soldiers who brought war to France told to her by a French soldier named Conrade, including the Battle of Agincourt and siege of Rouen. They finally arrive at Chinon where they are able to find the French court.

When Joan comes to speak with Charles, the Dauphin pretends to be a common member of the court while someone else pretends to be him. Joan is able to see through the ruse and immediately proclaims that she is sent to restore the French crown to him at Rheims. Charles has her examined by priests and scholars to determine that she is free of black magic. While questioned, Joan describes how God came to her with visions and describes her faith in a similar manner to deism. This causes the examiners to believe that she is a heretic until a blue flame appears along with a sound, which is enough to silence any doubts about her faith. The flame reveals a suit of armour for her, but one individual interrupts her immediate donning of the armour to claim that France is cursed and that she would be a victim. The individual, as it turns out, is Conrade, who blames himself that Joan left her peaceful life to help a French court that was corrupt. He also warns her that he experienced a vision of her burning at the stake.

Following this, Joan begins to gather troops and she takes her army to the forests around Orleans. While they camp there, a girl named Isabel comes and begins to describe the events surrounding siege of the city. Joan sends a messenger to offer the English peace, but they decline. The French storm the city and, as soon as they start, a storm starts up and lightning flashes about them. This scares the defending English garrison and Joan is able to capture the city. The story continues with various French victories, with the English being pushed back from fort after fort. Eventually, the English are pushed back to Tourelles. While the English fight their way there, one of their generals, Salisbury, wounds Joan. Her companion, Theodore, kills Salisbury in return but he is cut down by John Talbot. The French soon lay siege to Tourelles and begin a bloody fight to take the fort. During the battle, the French take many captives and the French generals wish to execute them. However, Joan intervenes and ensures the safety of the captives' lives.

In sparing the lives, the French are awarded by God with the collapse of a bridge that leads to many English soldiers drowning and a quick victory. The English, after losing Tourelles, fall back to the coast to await for reinforcements. Word comes that the Burgundian troops are coming to help the English. Joan meets with the Duke of Burgundy to warn him against a battle before she returns to her men to help bury the dead. Talbot's son comes with reinforcements from England, and the English army attacks the French at Patay. During the battle, Joan kills the son and Conrade kills the father. This causes Talbot's army to flee and, in turn, allows the French to retake Rheims. Once Rheims is retaken, Charles comes and is crowned the King of France. The story ends with Joan telling him to be a good king.

== Themes ==
In terms of subject matter, the story of Joan of Arc was not well known outside of a legend. A history dealing with Joan written by Clement L'Averdy was written in 1790 but it was probably unknown to Southey. This would serve as the major historical source of information on her until Jules Quicherat's history published during the mid-19th century. Of non-historical works, Voltaire's La Pucelle was well known but the work attacks Joan. Joan's reputation was polemical, and Joan would later be turned into a French hero with Napoleon's encouragement. Friedrich Schiller would also deal with the legend the same way in Die Jungfrau von Orleans. In terms of works relying on the general idea of a warrior woman, many such figures exited in epics: Virgil and Camilla, Tasso has Clorinda, and Spenser had Britomart. However, such females were not the central figure as a woman was unique to Southey at the time.

The poem's focus on France served as a way for Southey to discuss his feelings about the ongoing French Revolutionary Wars. In particular, Southey was opposed to the British government's raising of several military reserve forces to defend against a planned French invasion. In terms of the French, Southey did not support Robespierre and the others who followed him in France. However, he did support the idea of the French Republic. When he heard of Marie Antoinette's execution in October 1793, Southey told his friend Bedford that he condemned the execution although he held to his Republican beliefs. However, he was further upset when word came that Jacques Pierre Brissot, the Girondin leader, was executed. This caused him to believe that all of the countries were equally bad, except the Republican United States, which he hoped to make his home. In 1794, many of Southey's feelings on Robespierre's involvement in these actions were included in both Joan of Arc and the Fall of Robbespierre, which followed after Robespierre's own execution. However, Southey had by then become very radical and believed that Robespierre was a great man who only helped mankind in his actions.

The poem also contains many of Southey's views on the Catholic Church and how it influenced his political views. Part of this comes from Southey's trip to Lisbon and Madrid in 1795 where he was exposed to what he believed as Catholic superstition. He believed that the church and the Catholic leaders kept the people ignorant, and he believed that the Muslims that were cast out of Spain were more tolerant. Many of these ideas are repeated in a speech within the work by Henry V, and the character attributes ignorance and vice to oppression. Southey believed that the only way to escape from these problems was for people to believe they were part of one universal family. His enemies later described Southey's as holding Jacobin belief and claimed he supported the extremism of Robbespierre, when his sympathies laid to a larger extent with the Girondins that were replaced by the Jacobins. However, the poem is still subversive since it described a French patriot fighting against the English that parallels the strife during Southey's time.

The figure of Joan of Arc represents both a common person and a child that was free from society's corruption. Between the editions, however, Southey's understanding of politics and religion began to change, and this is reflected in the changes of Joan of Arc for the second edition. Joan was originally a character that had a natural understanding of religion that was connected to a Socinian form of Christianity. She, as a child, was ignorant of Church and of theology except what was revealed to her directly. However, this was replaced in the second edition with Joan having a more traditional form of religion that was provided to her during her youth.

== Critical reception ==
Regarding Joan of Arc, William Wordsworth wrote to William Matthews, 21 March 1796, claiming: "You were right about Southey, he is certainly a coxcomb, and has proved it completely by the preface to his Joan of Arc, an epic poem which he has just published. This preface is indeed a very conceited performance and the poem though in some passages of first-rate excellence is on the whole of very inferior execution." Charles Lamb, in a 10 June 1796 letter to Coleridge, stated, "With Joan of Arc I have been delighted, amazed. I had not presumed to expect of any thing of such excellence from Southey. Why the poem is alone sufficient to redeem the character of the age we live in from the imputation of degenerating in Poetry [...] The subject is well chosen. It opens well [...] On the whole, I expect Southey one day to rival Milton." (A few days later, though, in a June 13, 1796 letter to Coleridge, after reading his opinion of the work, Lamb tempered his praise: "Perhaps I had estimated Southey's merits too much by number, weight, and measure.") Coleridge, in a 31 December 1796 letter to John Thelwall, admitted, "I entirely accord with your opinion of Southey's Joan [...] the poem tho' it frequently reach the sentimental, does not display, the poetical, Sublime. In language at once natural, perspicuous, & dignified, in manly pathos, in soothing & sonnet-like description, and above all, in character, & dramatic dialogue, Southey is unrivalled; but as certainly he does not possess opulence of Imagination, lofty-paced Harmony, or that toil of thinking, which is necessary in order to plan a Whole."

John Aikin, in a review for the April 1796 Monthly Review, claimed, "We were sorry to observe, in the preface to this work, certain facts stated in order to display the extreme rapidity with which it was written. An epic poem in 12 books finished in six weeks, and, on its improved plan in 10 books, almost entirely recomposed during the time of printing! Is it possible that a person of classical education can have so slight an opinion of (perhaps) the most arduous effort of human invention, as to suffer the fervour and confidence of youth to hurry him in such a manner through a design which may fix the reputation of a whole life?" The review continued: "To proceed to the execution of the design: we do not hesitate to declare our opinion that the poetical powers displayed in it are of a very superior kind, and such as, if not wasted in premature and negligent exertions, promise a rich harvest of future excellence. Conceptions more lofty and daring, sentiments more commanding, and language more energetic than some of the best passages in this poem afford, will not easily be found:—nor does scarcely any part of it sink to languor; as the glow of feeling and genius animates the whole."

An anonymous review in the June 1796 Critical Review argued, "When the character of the Maid of Orleans, and the part taken by her against the English, are considered, together with the manner in which the history has been treated by other writers, some suspicion may at first arise, that Mr. Southey has chosen a subject scarcely suited to the dignity of epic poetry. His prudence at least may be called in question. How can he expect to interest the English nation in the fortunes of a heroine who was an active champion against his own countrymen, or be hardly enough to felicitate those successes that involved the English in disgrace?" In regard to the effort put into writing the poem, the review concluded: "The poetical powers of Mr. Southey are indisputably very superior, and capable, we doubt not, of producing a poem that will place him in the first class of English poets. He is at present, he tells his readers, engaged in the execution of Madoc [...] We cannot, therefore, help expressing our wish, that he would not put his future poem to so hazardous an experiment as he has this, by assigning himself so little time for its completion."

Following this was an anonymous review for the 1796 Analytical Review that stated, "we learn with astonishment, that Joan of Arc, in its first form, in twelve books, was [...] finished in six weeks [...] We thought it right to mention a fact on which the author, by detailing it in the beginning of his preface, appears to lay some stress; but we wish entirely to forget it in our examination of the poem, and request our readers to do the same. The story, upon which this poem is founded, is one of the most interesting in the history of France, and is, in several respects, happily adapted to epic representation." The review continued: "The general result of the impression which the perusal of this poem has made upon our minds is this: that, although the poem has some redundancies, which the chastised taste of maturer years would have struck out; though a manifest incongruity runs through the piece, in ascribing to characters of the fifteenth century the politics and metaphysics of an enlightened philosopher of the eighteenth; and though allegorical personages [...] but ill supply the place of that grand machinery, which produced so powerful an effect in those epic poems, which have obtained the glorious meed of immortality; we, nevertheless, admire, the noble spirit of freedom, which is evidently the poet's inspiring muse".
