= To Southey =

Poem written by Samuel Taylor Coleridge

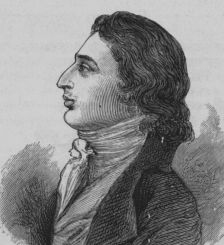
Robert Southey

"To Southey" or "To Robert Southey" was written by Samuel Taylor Coleridge and published in the 14 January 1795 Morning Chronicle as part of his Sonnets on Eminent Characters series. Robert Southey became a close friend of Coleridge during the summer of 1794 and the two originally formed a plan to start an ideal community together. Although the plan fell apart, Coleridge dedicated the poem to his friend and emphasized Southey's poetic abilities. Following the poem, Coleridge further drifted from Southey and the poem was not republished.

== Background ==
Coleridge first met Southey when Coleridge was about to tour Wales during the summer of 1794. They shared similar political views and the two bonded immediately. Together, they established a plan to create a community run by the ideas of Pantisocracy, a system that would emphasize agriculture and communal living. To further attain this goal, they each married one of the Fricker sisters and started to make financial arrangements along with discussing with others that would join them. The two wrote many poems, with The Fall of Robespierre written by both, and they planned to sell the poems to help provide money. However, Coleridge left the side of his wife and travelled to London to further his poetic career.

On 1 December 1794, the Morning Chronicle began to run a series of Coleridge's poems called Sonnets on Eminent Characters or on "Eminent Contemporaries". In a 17 December 1794 letter from Coleridge to Southey, Coleridge copied a sonnet about Southey with a note that said, "I took the Liberty—Gracious God! pardon me for the aristocratic frigidity of that expression—I indulged my Feelings by sending this among my Contemporary Sonnets". The poem was printed for the 14 January 1795 Morning Chronicle, which ran it as the tenth poem of Coleridge's series under the name "To Robert Southey, of Baliol College, Oxford, Author of the 'Retrospect,' and Other Poems". It was the only time the poem was published.

Although Coleridge and Southey continued to spend time together and collaborate on their poetic efforts, their relationship was greatly strained and their ideas for the Pantisocratic government fell apart. The change in Coleridge's opinions on both Southey and William Godwin is reflected in Coleridge's not republishing the poems on either of them within his 1796 collection of poems. However, Coleridge also omitted the poems because he did not think they were any good.

== Poem ==
The only edition of the poem reads:

Southey! thy melodies steal o'er mine ear
Like far-off joyance, or the murmering
Of wild bees in the sunny showers of Spring—
Sounds of such mingled import as may cheer

The lonely breast, yet rouse a mindful tear:
Wak'd by the Song doth Hope-born Fancy fling
Rich showers of dewy fragrance from her wing,
Till sickly Passion's drooping Myrtles sear

Blossom anew! But O! more thrill'd, I prize
Thy sadder strains, that bid in Memory's Dream
The faded forms of past Delight arise;
Then soft, on Love's pale cheek, the tearful gleam

Of Pleasures smiles—as, faint, yet beauteous lies
The imag'd Rainbow on a willowy stream.

== Themes ==
The Sonnets on Eminent Characters contained many poems dedicated to those Coleridge considered his hero from many fields, with Southey ranking amongst them. Like the poems in the series "To Godwin" and "To Bowles", "To Southey" talks about Coleridge's personal life and Southey's involvement in it. The heroes were divided into those who were artists, intellectuals, political figures, and military figures in a way similar to Milton. In particular, Milton's sonnet on Henry Lawes ("Sonnet 13") was the model for Coleridge's poem on Southey, along with the poem "To Bowles" and "To Mrs Siddons".

Like with Coleridge's feelings towards William Godwin after writing "To Godwin", Coleridge began to intellectually separate from Southey after "To Southey", and, during his lecture series in 1795, he began to stress Christianity as essential to his political beliefs. However, even within the poem, there is no direct reference to Southey's liberal political beliefs. Instead, the poem only discusses Southey as a poet. A side effect from not including the sonnet in the 1796 series is that Coleridge effectively removed the only sonnet about a contemporary poet from the series.
