= Peter Vandyke =

Dutch painter

Peter Vandyke (1729 – c. 1800) was a Dutch painter and portraitist who worked mainly in England.

Vandyke was born in Holland in 1729 and came over to England at the invitation of Sir Joshua Reynolds to assist in painting draperies and similar work for him. He exhibited a few pictures at the Incorporated Society of Artists in 1762 and 1764, and six portraits at the Free Society of Artists in 1767. Subsequently he settled at Bristol and practised as a portrait-painter there. In 1795, he painted for Joseph Cottle, the publisher, portraits of Samuel Taylor Coleridge and Robert Southey, which are now in the National Portrait Gallery. The portrait of Coleridge was engraved.

It has been stated, but apparently with little ground, that Vandyke was connected by family with Sir Anthony van Dyck. He was possibly related to Philip van Dyk, a well-known portrait-painter at Amsterdam, who died in 1752. The date of Vandyke's death has not been ascertained.

== Bibliography ==
- Cust, Lionel Henry (1899). "Vandyke, Peter" . In Lee, Sidney (ed.). Dictionary of National Biography. Vol. 58. London: Smith, Elder & Co. pp. 111–112.
