= Amos Simon Cottle =

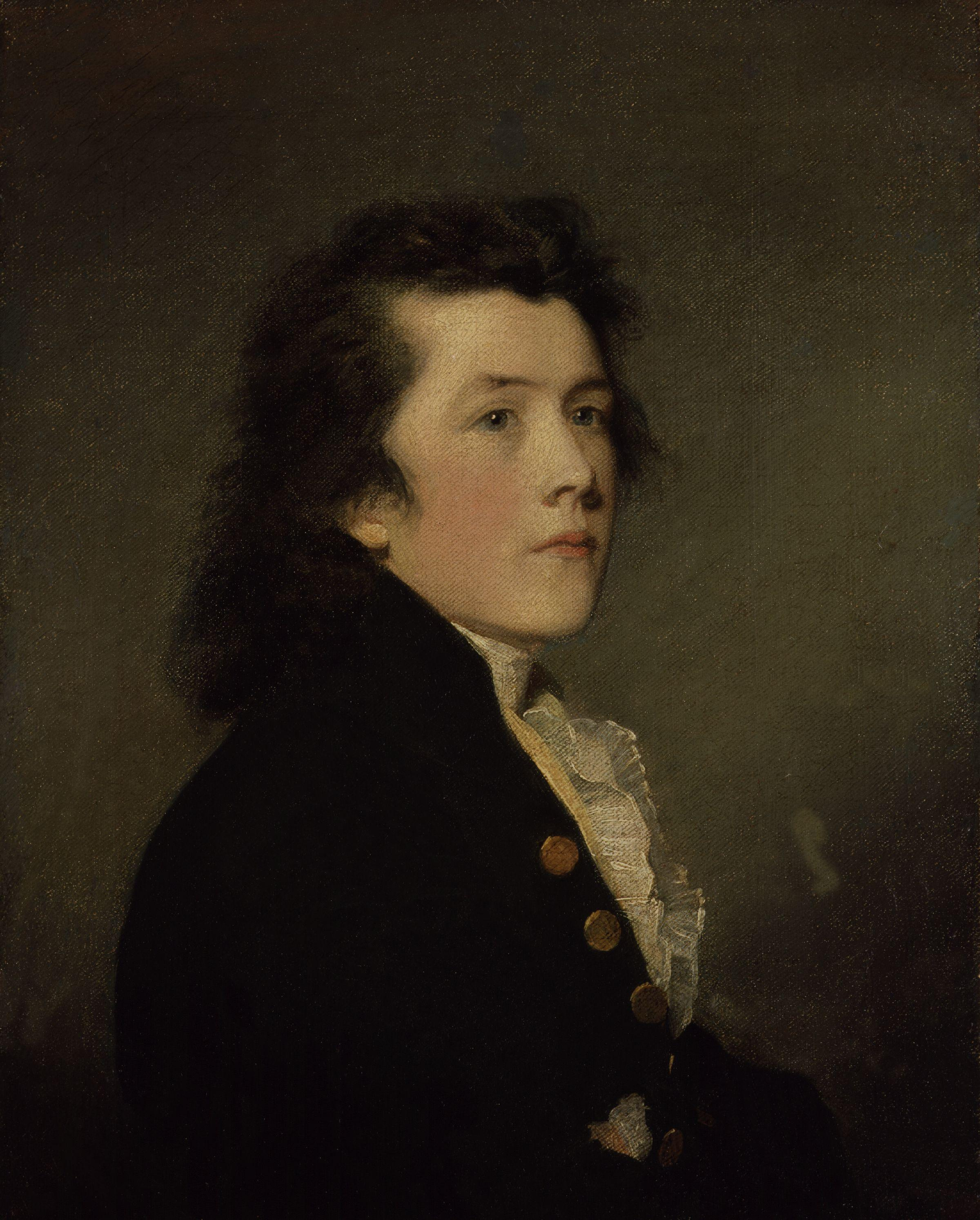
A 1787 portrait of Amos Simon Cottle by William Palmer

Amos Simon Cottle (1766–1800) was an English translator and poet. His publications include, Icelandic poetry or The Edda of Sæmund which was first printed in 1797 with Robert Southey as a co-author.

== Life ==
The elder brother of the author Joseph Cottle, he was born in Gloucestershire. He received a classical education at Mr. Henderson's school at Hanham, near Bristol, and subsequently as a mature student at Magdalene College, Cambridge, taking his B.A. degree in 1799. He died at his chambers in Clifford's Inn on 28 September 1800.

== Works ==
His principal work is Icelandic Poetry, or the Edda of Saemund, translated into English verse, Bristol, 1797. It is not stated whether the translation is made from the original Icelandic or from a Latin version; it is not faithful nor vigorous. It is preceded by a critical introduction, and a poetical address from Southey to the author, which contains the panegyric of Mary Wollstonecraft, ‘who among women left no equal mind.’ She died on 10 September 1797, and Cottle's preface is dated on 1 November.

His final work, the blank-verse epic poem Alfred the Great (written in twenty-four books, after the Iliad and Odyssey), was published in London in the year of his death.

Other poems of Cottle, including one on missionary enterprise and a Latin ode on the French conquest of Italy, were published with his brother's Malvern Hills.
