= George Burnett (writer) =

English nonconformist minister, writer, surgeon and tutor

George Burnett (c. 1776 – 1811) was an English nonconformist minister, surgeon and tutor, known best as a writer in that time.

== Life ==
He was the son of a farmer at Huntspill in Somerset, where he was born about 1776. After an introduction to classical literature by a clergyman in the neighbourhood, he was sent to Balliol College, Oxford, with a view to his taking orders in Church of England. After two or three years' residence he became disillusioned with college life, and took part in the scheme of pantisocracy with Samuel Taylor Coleridge and Robert Southey.

After a period supported by his father, Burnett obtained admission as a student at Manchester New College. He was appointed pastor of a congregation at Great Yarmouth, but did not remain there long. He subsequently became, for a short time, a student of medicine in the University of Edinburgh. He was at one time appointed domestic tutor to two sons of Charles Stanhope, 3rd Earl Stanhope, but both his pupils very shortly left their father's house. Burnett then became an assistant surgeon in a militia regiment.

He soon went to Poland with the family of Count Zamoyski, as English tutor, but in less than a year returned to England, without any employment. He left Huntspill, where he had been writing, and his relatives received no communication from him. From November 1809 till his death, which took place in the Marylebone Infirmary in February 1811, he relied on friends.

== Works ==
He contributed to the Monthly Magazine a series of letters which were reprinted under the title of ‘View of the Present State of Poland,’ Lond. 1807. He next published ‘Specimens of English Prose Writers, from the earliest times to the close of the seventeenth century; with sketches biographical and literary; including an account of books, as well as of their authors, with occasional criticisms,’ 3 vols. Lond. 1807; a compilation forming a companion to George Ellis's ‘Specimens of the Early English Poets.’ He also wrote the introduction to the ‘Universal History,’ published under the name of Dr. William Fordyce Mavor. His last production, consisting of a selection from John Milton's prose works, with new translations and an introduction (2 vols. Lond. 1809,), was compiled at Huntspill in 1808–9, and dedicated to Lord Erskine.
