= Caroline Anne Southey =

English poet and painter (1786–1854)

Caroline Anne Southey (née Bowles; 6 December 1786 – 20 July 1854) was an English poet and painter. She became the second wife of the poet Robert Southey, a prominent writer at the time.

== Background ==
Born Caroline Anne Bowles on 6 December 1786 at Buckland Manor, near Lymington, she was the only child of Captain Charles Bowles (1737–1801), retired from the East India Company, and Anne Burrard (1753–1817), of a prominent local family. Her melancholic father moved the family to the much smaller Buckland Cottage when she was a child, but she spent her summers by the sea at Calshot Castle, home of a military uncle, Sir Harry Burrard.

Her private education was mainly at the hands of the writer and artist William Gilpin (1724–1804), vicar of nearby Boldre, known for his introduction of the idea of the post-Enlightenment picturesque. She showed early artistic talent. Some of her surviving paintings are owned by Keswick School and held by the Wordsworth Trust.

== Penury and poetry ==
Mismanagement by a guardian left Bowles in financial straits after her mother's death in 1817. These were alleviated partly by an annuity of £150 from an adopted son of her father, Colonel Bruce. The problem spurred her to seek publication for a "metrical verse tale" she had written. She wrote for advice first to the poet laureate, Robert Southey, her future husband, but his publisher, John Murray was discouraging, then to the poet and editor James Montgomery. The work was published by Longman in 1820 as Ellen Fitzarthur: a Poem in Five Cantos and reached a second edition in 1822. Much of her work was published initially in Blackwood's Edinburgh Magazine, after she had struck up a lively correspondence with William Blackwood.

Bowles's first meeting with Southey in 1820 led to a proposal that they jointly write an epic poem about Robin Hood, although this only yielded Robin Hood: A Fragment after Southey's death. From the outset she could not work in the curious metre Southey chose: "I have been at work trying that metre of [Southey's poem] 'Thalaba', a fine work I make of it! It is to me just like attempting to drive a tilbury in a tram-road," she wrote to him.

Most of the fragment eventually published in 1847 was the work of Caroline Southey, including some fine sonnets on their marriage, which took place only on 4 June 1839, after the death of his first wife. There was a second edition of her mixed volume of verse and prose, Solitary Hours (1826), in that year. The marriage caused dismay among Southey's grown-up children, except for his eldest daughter Edith.

Within three months of the marriage, Southey began to succumb to senile dementia. He died in March 1843. The wrangles spilled over into gossip, and lost Caroline Southey the support of Wordsworth, for example. Caroline Southey had to leave Southey's home, Greta Hall, immediately after his death, and move back to Buckland Cottage, where she ceased to write. Her marriage had lost her the Bruce annuity, but she was awarded a civil list pension of £200 in 1852. She died at home on 20 July 1854.

== Satire and protest ==
Writing about Ellen Fitzarthur, Southey said, "You have the eye, the ear, and the heart of a poetess..." (Dowden, p. 10). Alfred H. Miles in the first decade of the last century noted that her work was neglected: it "had a greater charm for her own generation than it can ever have again. There is a natural simplicity about it which gives it a certain affinity with the so-called 'Lake school', and which was much newer in her day than it is in ours. And yet... her work still emits a sweet mild fragrance, and recalls a tender, sympathetic personality."

Her published output of five books of verse, two books of prose tales and one miscellany of mixed prose and verse has been described by the present-day scholar Anne Zanzucchi as the work of "an experimental and dexterous writer whose publications represent a range of forms: prose fiction (Chapters on Churchyards), verse satire (The Cat's Tail), dramatic monologue (Tales of the Factories), and blank verse autobiography (The Birth-day)." The last was the work in which she broke her anonymity in 1836.

Virginia H. Blain in the Oxford Dictionary of National Biography notes that her "Tales of the Factories were among the earliest of that kind of protest poetry, preceding both Caroline Norton's and Elizabeth Barrett's works in the genre."

The romance of Southey and Bowles was the subject of a BBC drama, The Fly and the Eagle.

Caroline Southey's poem To Death was composed as a song by Grace Williams in 1953.

== Works ==
- Ellen Fitzarthur : A Metrical Tale, in Five Cantos, London 1820 (Google Books)
- The Widow's Tale: and Other Poems, London 1822 (Internet Archive)
- Solitary Hours, Edinburgh & London 1826 (Internet Archive)
- Chapters on Churchyards, London 1829 (Vol. I and Vol II in the Internet Archive)
- The Cat's Tail: Being the History of Childe Merlin. A Tale, illustrated by George Cruikshank, Edinburgh & London 1831 (Internet Archive)
- Tales of the Factories, Edinburgh & London 1833 (Google Books)
- The Birth-day; a Poem, in Three Parts: to Which are Added, Occasional Verses, Edinburgh & London 1836 (Internet Archive)
- The Early Called, Philadelphia 1836 (Internet Archive, see p. 5–82)
- Autumn Flowers and Other Poems, Boston 1844 (Internet Archive)
- Robin Hood : A Fragment. By the Late Robert Southey and Caroline Southey. With Other Fragments and Poems by R. S. & C. S., Edinburgh & London 1847 (Internet Archive)
- The Young Gray Head, New York 1868 (HathiTrust)

=== Letters ===
- Correspondence with Caroline Bowles, to which are added Correspondence with Shelley, and Southey's Dreams. Edited, with an Introduction, by Edward Dowden, Dublin & London 1881 (Internet Archive)

=== Selected works ===
- Gems Selected from the Poems of Caroline Bowles, Boston 1836 (Internet Archive)
- The Select Literary Works, Prose and Verse by Caroline Southey, 1851 (One Volume in Two Parts; Part I and Part II in the Internet Archive)
- The Poetical Works of Caroline Bowles Southey, Edinburgh & London 1867 (Internet Archive)
