= To Godwin =

Poem written by Samuel Taylor Coleridge

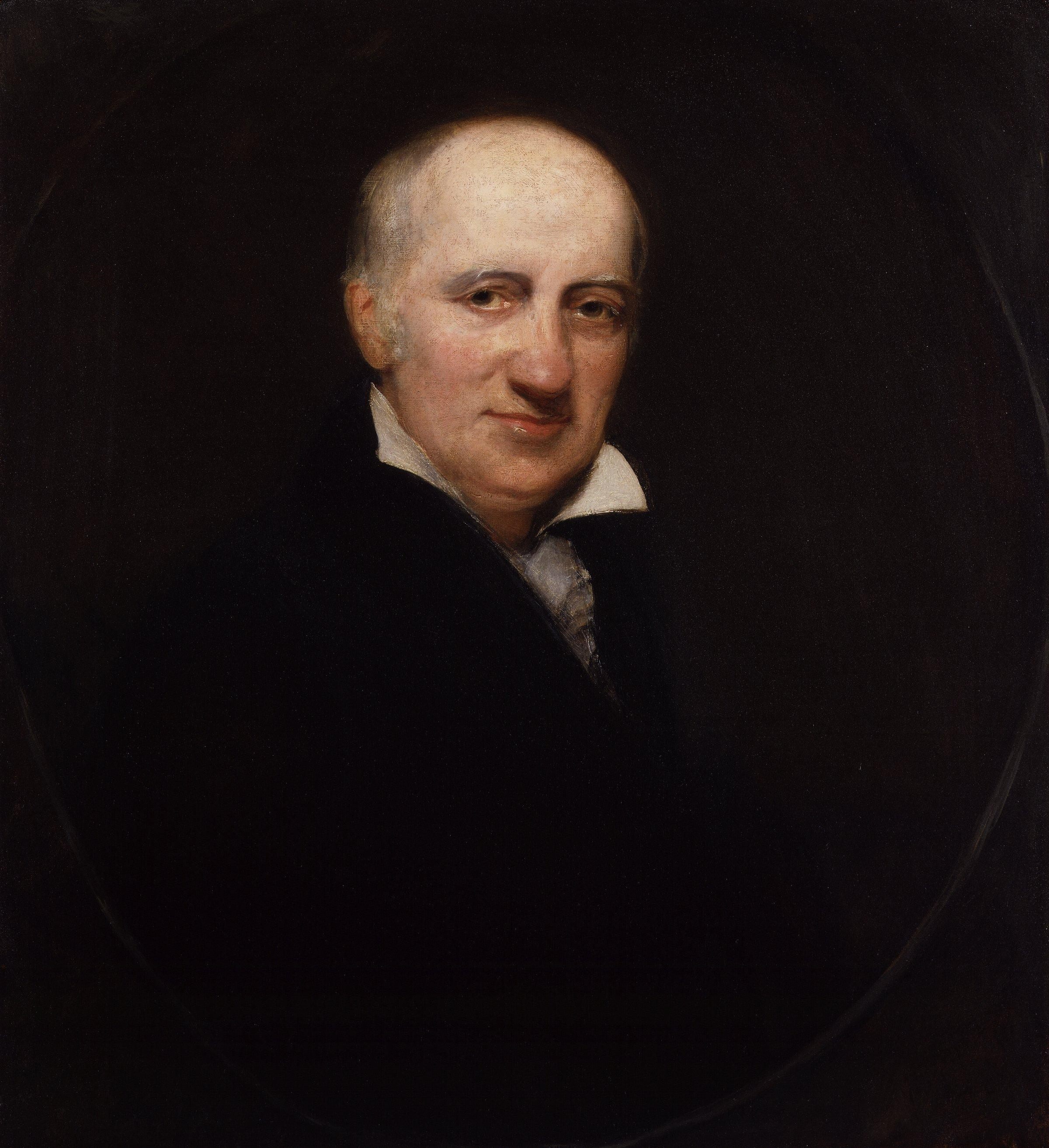
William Godwin by Henry William Pickersgill

"To Godwin" or "To William Godwin" was written by Samuel Taylor Coleridge and published in the 10 January 1795 Morning Chronicle as part of the Sonnets on Eminent Characters series. William Godwin was admired by Coleridge for his political beliefs. However, Coleridge did not support Godwin's atheistic views, which caused tension between the two. Although the poem praises Godwin, it invokes an argument that the two shared over theological matters. After the poem was written, the relationship between Coleridge and Godwin cooled and the poem was not reprinted.

== Background ==
Coleridge's "To William Godwin, Author of Political Justice" became the ninth sonnet in the series Sonnets on Eminent Characters in the 10 January 1795 Morning Chronicle. Coleridge sent 6 lines of the poem to Robert Southey in a letter that read: "I have written one to Godwin—but the mediocrity of the eight first Lines is most miserably magazinish! I have plucked therefore these scentless Road flowers from the Chaptlet—and intreat thee, thou River God of Pieria, to weave into it the gorgeous Water Lily from thy stream, or the fair smelling Violets on thy Bank".

Coleridge was dissatisfied with the poem's quality and content, and the poem was not republished in one of Coleridge's collections of poems after it appeared in the Morning Chronicle. In particular, his views of Godwin turned from the worse following the printing. By 1796, Coleridge's changed views on Godwin began to be shared by others, including his friend Charles Lamb. However, Lamb was to later befriend Godwin in 1798. By 1800, Coleridge, Lamb, and others were still associating with Godwin, and Coleridge joined others in helping Godwin produce a play at the end of the year.

== Poem ==
The poem reads:

O! form'd t' illume a sunless world forlorn,
As o'er the chill and dusky brow of Night,
In Finland's wintry skies, the Mimic Morn
Electric pours a stream of rosy light,

Pleas'd I have mark'd Oppression, terror-pale,
Since, thro' the windings of her dark machine,
Thy steady eye has shot its glances keen—
And bade th' All-lovely "scenes at distance hail".

Nor will I not thy holy guidance bless,
And hymn thee, Godwin! with an arden lay;
For that thy voice, in Passion's stormy day,
When wild I roam'd the bleak Heath of Distress,

Bade the bright form of Justice meet my way—
And told me that her name was Happiness.

Southey's original sketch for eight lines of the poem, on Coleridge's request, read:

What tho Oppressions blood-cemented fane
Stands proudly threatning arrogant in state,
Not thine his savage priests to immolate
Or hurl the fabric on the encumberd plain
As with a whirlwinds fury. it is thine
When dark Revenge maskd in the form adord
Of Justice, lifts on high the murderous sword
To save the erring victim from her shrine.

== Themes ==
The Sonnets on Eminent Characters contained many poems dedicated to those Coleridge considered his hero from many fields. Of the poems, "To Godwin" is similar to the poems "To Bowles" and "To Robert Southey" in that they talk about Coleridge's personal life and Godwin's influence over it. However, Coleridge's view of Godwin changed over time and he grew dissatisfied with the poem as a result. Coleridge respected Godwin for Godwin's support of those put on trial during the 1794 Treason Trials, and Coleridge owed much of his political beliefs to Godwin. However, Coleridge and Godwin differed on their views of religion, which became a source of dispute between the two.

Following the reading of Coleridge's previous poem in the series "To Kosciusko" by Thomas Holcroft, Holcroft invited Coleridge to dinner with Godwin, Richard Porson, and himself. The conversation turned to religion, and Coleridge believed that Porson was a strong speaker while Godwin lacked intelligence in his speech. Godwin, unlike Coleridge, was an atheist, which caused Coleridge concern. On Coleridge's admission, he was able to win the debate with Holcroft but was unable to convince Godwin about theism until 5 years later. Within "To Godwin", Coleridge addresses Godwin with religious terms in a manner to provoke while simultaneously praising Godwin. In particular, lines 9 and 10 continue this previous dispute with Godwin but in poetic form.

Coleridge's support of Godwin's politics appeared in his A Moral and Political Lecture given in Bristol during 1795. However, in Coleridge's Political Lecture of the same year, he criticized Godwin's political beliefs that Coleridge suggests separated Godwin from the masses. Further works during 1795 continued to discuss the positives and negatives of Godwin, with Conciones ad Populum attacking philosophy that is not dedicated to mankind, in reference to Godwin, and Lectures on Revealed Religion, its Corruption, and Politica Views in which he argued in support of Godwin's promotion of the removal of private property, the idea that government is problematic, and that revolution shouldn't be violent, but Coleridge continued to Christianize Godwin's philosophy. By 1796, Coleridge completely turned against Godwin's beliefs. At the time, Coleridge planned to write a small essay against Godwin, and he criticized Godwin's atheism in a 17 December 1796 letter to John Thelwall, one of the defendants in the 1794 Treason Trials.
