= To Sheridan =

Poem written by Samuel Taylor Coleridge

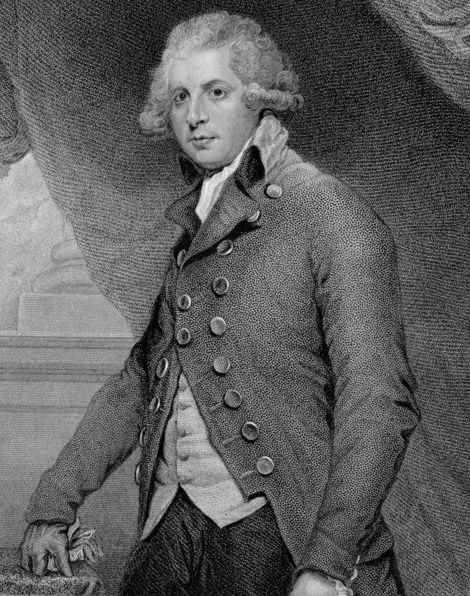
Richard Brinsley Sheridan by Joshua Reynolds

"To Sheridan" or "To Richard Brinsley Sheridan" was written by Samuel Taylor Coleridge and published in the 29 January 1795 Morning Chronicle. As the last poem running as part of the Sonnets on Eminent Characters series, it describes Coleridge's appreciation of Richard Brinsley Sheridan and his theatre talents. Coleridge, unlike most, preferred Sheridan's somber works over his comedies and emphasizes them within the poem. Coleridge also respects Sheridan's political actions.

== Background ==
Coleridge's "To Richard Brinsley Sheridan, Esq." became the final poem in his Sonnets on Eminent Characters series when it was published in the 29 January 1795 Morning Chronicle. It was revised somewhat and published again in Coleridge's 1796 collection of poems with a note about Hymettian Flowrets. It was reprinted again in 1803 without any changes. The poem was included in Coleridge's collections in 1828, 1829, and 1834, with the only change being the removal of the note.

Sheridan was a famous comic playwright, but Coleridge emphasized the sentimental aspects of Sheridan's writing. The connection that Coleridge felt in regards to the sadder works of Sheridan is what prompted him to dedicate a poem to the playwright and not to someone else, such as a political figure. Coleridge also had a personal connection to Sheridan through his friendship with William Smyth, the tutor to Thomas Sheridan, the playwright's son. Coleridge also knew of Sheridan as a political figure; Sheridan was a witness during the 1794 Treason Trials and also argued for the repeal of the Habeas Corpus Suspension Act. A speech on the matter was printed in the January Morning Chronicle before Coleridge's sonnet was published.

== Poem ==
The 1796 edition of the poem read:

It was some spirit, SHERIDAN! that breath'd
O'er thy young mind such wildly-various power!
My soul hath mark'd thee in her shaping hour,
They temples with Hymettian flowrets wreath'd:
And sweet thy voice, as when o'er Laura's bier
Sad music trembled thro' Vauclusa's glade;
Sweet, as at dawn the love-lorn Serenade
That wafts soft dreams to Slumber's list'ning ear.
Now patriot Rage and Indignation high
Sweet the full tones! And now thine eye-beams dance
Meaning of Scorn and Wit's quaint revelry!
Writhes inly from the bosom-probing glance
Th' Apostate by the brainless rout ador'd,
As erst that elder Fiend beneath great Michael's sword.

A note attached to line four read: "Hymettian Flowrets. Hymettus a mountain near Athens, celebrated for its honey. This alludes to Mr. Sheridan's classical attainments, and the following four lines to the exquisite sweetness and almost Italian delicacy of his Poetry.—In Shakespeare's 'Lover's Complaint' there is a fine stanza almost prophetically characteristic of Mr. Sheridan." Following the note are these verses:

So on the tip of his subduing tongue
All kinds of argument and question deep,
All replication prompt and reason strong
For his advantage still did wake and sleep,
To make the weeper laugh, the laugher weep:
He had the dialect and different skill
Catching all passions in his craft of will;
That he did in the general bosom reign
Of young and old. [...]

— William Shakespeare, "A Lover's Complaint", lines 120-128, as quoted in the 1796 notes

In the original Morning Chronicle edition, the first four lines read:

Was it some Spirit, SHERIDAN! that breath'd
His various influences on thy natal hour?—
My Fancy bodies forth the Guardian Power
His temples with Hymettian flowrets wreath'd;

— lines 1–4

== Themes ==
The Sonnets on Eminent Characters contained many poems dedicated to those Coleridge considered his hero from many fields. The heroes were divided into those who were artists, intellectuals, political figures, and military figures in a way similar to how John Milton divided his poems dedicated to various individuals. In particular, Milton's sonnet on Henry Vane ("Sonnet 17") was the model for Coleridge's poem on Sherida along with the poem "To Erskine". With Coleridge's poem "To Bowles", "To Sheridan" was the only representation of Coleridge's contemporaries from literature within his 1796 collection of poems.
