= Robert Lovell =

English poet (1771–1796)

Robert Lovell (1771–1796) was an English poet who was known for his poem, Bristol: A Satire, which criticised the many merchants of Bristol and their involvement in "mortal corruption" which involved the slave trade.

== Life ==
He was born in Bristol, the son of a wealthy Quaker. He estranged himself from his original circle by marrying Mary Fricker in 1794, a girl of much beauty and some talent, who had gone on the stage. He became Robert Southey's acquaintance, and Southey became engaged to Mary's sister, Edith; this was before Samuel Taylor Coleridge's visit to Bristol in August 1794. Lovell introduced the two poets to their patron Joseph Cottle, and shortly Coleridge was betrothed to a third sister, Sara Fricker, whom he married on 4 October 1795.

The three young men were at that time occupied with the project for their pantisocratic colony on the banks of the Susquehanna River, to which Lovell was to have brought not only his wife but his brother and two sisters. The plan had largely collapsed before Lovell's death on May 3, 1796 from a fever. Edith Southey, in Southey's absence, nursed him and Coleridge was with him at his death.

== Family matters ==
Lovell's father refused all help to his daughter-in-law Mary on the grounds of her having been an actress, and she and her infant son turned to Southey for support. She lived in his family during his life, and afterwards with his daughter Kate until her death at the age of ninety. The son, Robert Lovell the younger (born 1795), settled in London as a printer in 1824. Some years afterwards he went to Italy and then disappeared. Henry Nelson Coleridge journeyed in quest of him, but no trace was discovered.

== Works ==
In August 1794 Lovell co-operated with Coleridge and Southey in the production of a three-act tragedy on The Fall of Robespierre. Each wrote an act, but Lovell's was then rejected as incompatible with the others, and Southey filled the void. The tragedy was published as Coleridge's at Cambridge in September 1794.

Southey and Lovell then combined to publish a joint volume of poetry (Bristol, 1794; Bath, 1795) under the title of Poems by Bion and Moschus; the Bath edition bears the authors' names. Southey later wished none of these poems reprinted; but they were in Thomas Park's British Poets (1808 sq. vol. xli.), with the addition of the Bristoliad by Lovell which does not seem to have been published before. The Bristoliad was a satire in Charles Churchill's style, and indicates that Lovell was ill at ease in the commercial atmosphere of Bristol.

After Lovell's death, Southey tried — and failed — to produce a subscription edition of his poems, to raise money for his widow and child. However, Lovell's writings were included in the Annual Anthology (1799 and 1800) and Specimens of the Later English Poets (1807).
