= Joseph Cottle =

English publisher and author (1770–1853)

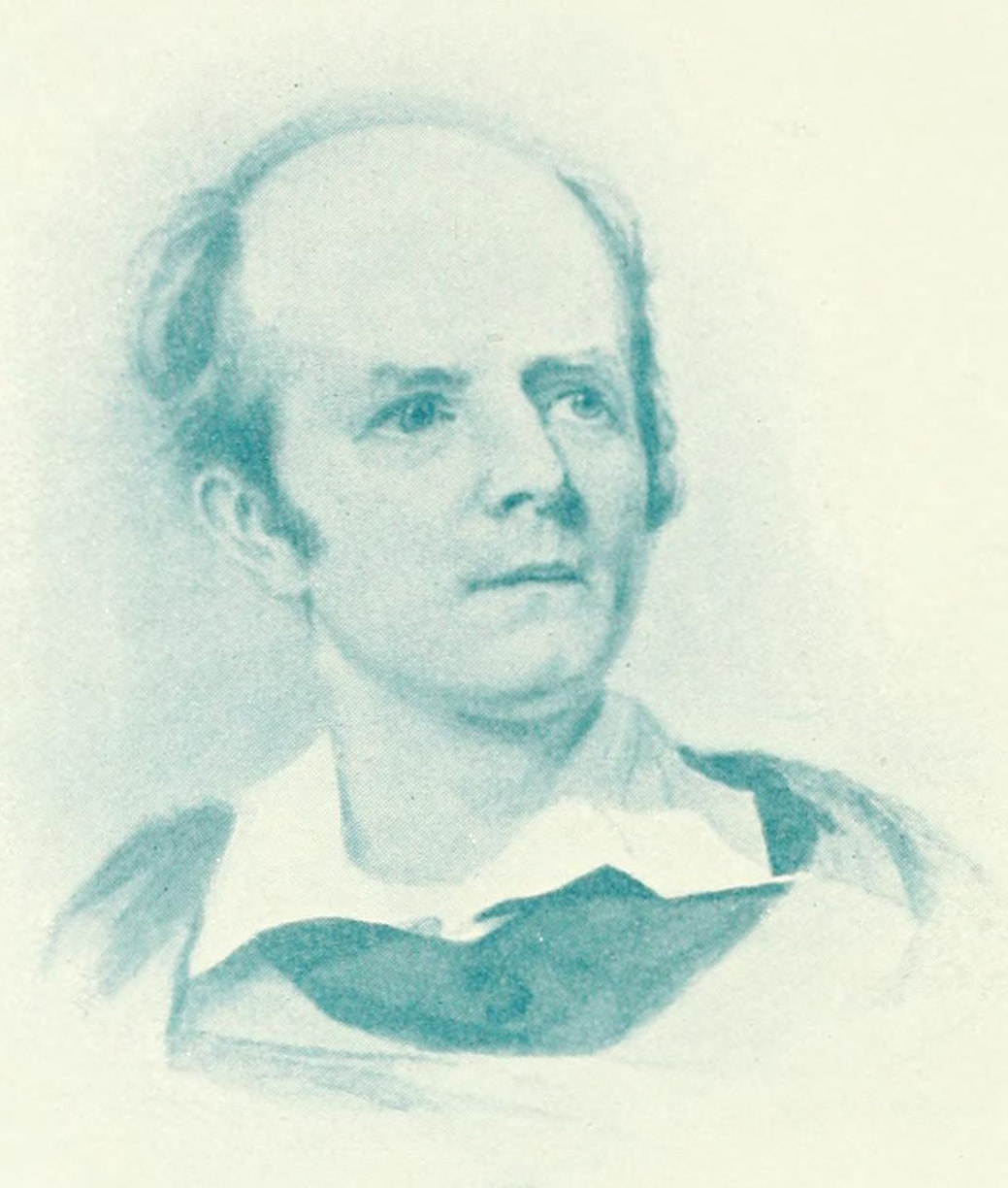
Joseph Cottle, after a portrait by Branwhite

Joseph Cottle (1770–1853) was an English publisher and author.

Cottle started business in Bristol. He published the works of Samuel Taylor Coleridge and Robert Southey on generous terms. He then wrote in his Early Recollections an exposure of Coleridge that was, at the time, severely criticised and generally condemned.

== Life ==
Joseph Cottle was born on 9 March 1770 in Barton Alley, Bristol. He was the brother of Amos Simon Cottle but did not receive his classical education; he was for two years at the school of Richard Henderson. Henderson advised him to become a bookseller, and Cottle set up in business in 1791. In 1794 he made, through Robert Lovell, the acquaintance of Coleridge and Southey, then in Bristol and preparing for emigration to America. Coleridge had been offered in London six guineas for the copyright of his poems, but Cottle offered thirty, and the same sum to Southey, also proposing to give the latter fifty guineas for his Joan of Arc, and made arrangements for the lectures delivered on behalf of pantisocracy. He facilitated Coleridge's marriage by the promise of a guinea and a half for every hundred lines of poetry he might produce after the completion of the volume already contracted for. This eventually appeared in April 1796. Joan of Arc was published in the same year.

Cottle next undertook the publication and support of Coleridge's periodical, The Watchman. He was shortly afterwards introduced by Coleridge to William Wordsworth, and the acquaintance resulted in the publication of the two poets' Lyrical Ballads in the autumn of 1798. In the following year Cottle retired from business as a bookseller.

His acquaintance with Coleridge was renewed years later. When in 1814 and 1815 Coleridge was at a low ebb by his opium addiction, Cottle addressed to him some well intended rebukes. In his Biographia Literaria, Coleridge alludes to Cottle as 'a friend from whom I never received any advice that was not wise, or a remonstrance that was not gentle and affectionate.' Cottle died at Fairfield House, Bristol, 7 June 1853.

== Works ==
He produced several volumes of his own. Malvern Hills was published in 1798, John the Baptist, a Poem, in 1801, Alfred, an Epic Poem, in the same year, The Fall of Cambria in 1809, Messiah in 1815. These pieces exposed him to the sarcasm of Lord Byron.

Against advice from Thomas Poole and James Gillman, Cottle, in his Early Recollections, chiefly relating to Samuel Taylor Coleridge (1837), enumerated his generosities to Coleridge and Southey, and entered into details of Coleridge's opium habit. 'The confusion in Cottle's "Recollections" is greater than any one would think possible,' said Southey; the book is inaccurate in its dates, and documents quoted are garbled. It has details on others such as Robert Lovell and William Gilbert. It has youthful portraits of Coleridge, Southey, Wordsworth, and Charles Lamb. A second edition was published in 1847 under the title of Reminiscences of Coleridge and Southey.

The appendix to the fourth edition of his Malvern Hills (1829) contains several essays, including an account of his tutor Henderson, a discussion of the authenticity of the Rowley poems, and a description of the Oreston Caves, near Plymouth, and their fossils. His correspondence with Joseph Haslewood on the Rowley manuscripts is preserved in the British Museum.

Cottle's poem "The Killcrop" was misattributed to Robert Southey. It was published in the Annual Anthology of 1799.

=== Bibliography ===
- Early Recollections
- Essays on Socinianism
- Reminiscences of Samuel Taylor Coleridge and Robert Southey (full text at Project Gutenberg)
