= Pantisocracy =

Utopian scheme

Pantisocracy (from the Greek πᾶν and ἰσοκρατία meaning "equal or level government by/for all") was a utopian scheme devised in 1794 by, among others, the poets Samuel Taylor Coleridge and Robert Southey for an egalitarian community. It is a system of government where all rule equally. They originally intended to establish such a community in the United States, choosing a site on the banks of the Susquehanna River after considering other places such as Kentucky. By 1795 Southey had doubts about the viability of this and proposed moving the project to Wales. The two men were unable to agree on the location, causing the project to collapse.

Others involved included the poet Robert Lovell and three of the Fricker sisters, Sara, Edith and Mary, who married the three poets, and George Burnett (who proposed unsuccessfully to another Fricker sister, Martha).

== Principles ==
The Pantisocrats believed that contemporary society and politics were responsible for cultures of servitude and oppression. Having abandoned these corrupting influences along with personal property for a fresh start in the wilderness, the Pantisocrats hoped that men might be governed by the "dictates of rational benevolence".

As spelled out by Southey, the utopian community he and Coleridge planned was to be built on two principles: "Pantisocracy" (meaning government by all) and "Aspheterism" (meaning general ownership of property). The scheme called for a small group of educated individuals to give up their possessions and labor together for the common good. Few regulations would be necessary to govern the colony and decisions would be made so as to avoid one man having more power than another. Coleridge envisioned Pantisocracy as a way to minimize the greed among men. Additionally, Coleridge and Southey hoped to enjoy a more relaxing existence than was possible in England, and expected that each member of the community would have to work just two to three hours per day to sustain the colony.

The Pantisocrats viewed their attempt as not only a search for personal domestic peace, but also as an attempt to change the status quo in England. One influence on the plan was disillusionment with the French Revolution and with the current politics of England, from which Coleridge may have sought solace through a utopian escape. Coleridge viewed the utopian scheme as an experiment that, if successful, might be gradually extended to a larger citizenship. Coleridge also hoped that through a more active, natural lifestyle he would live a healthier and more wholesome existence with his family.

== Inspirations ==
Like many utopian societies, the Pantisocracy envisioned by the members owed its origins to Plato's ideal commonwealth, envisioned in the later books of The Republic and in Critias. More modern examples for the Pantisocrats included Sir Thomas More's Utopia, Francis Bacon's New Atlantis, Tommaso Campanella's Civitas Solis, and the accounts of Cotton Mather.

The Pantisocrats were also heavily influenced by contemporary travel accounts of the New World. Many writers who visited the new world (including J. P. Brissot, Thomas Cooper and Joseph Priestley) described a fresh and inviting country, whose inhabitants were untainted by the evils of society. Coleridge and Southey pored over these and other accounts of the American continent.

== Beginnings ==
As early as November 1793, Robert Southey was envisioning a utopia in the newly independent United States. Coleridge's schoolfriend Robert Allen had become acquainted with Southey while at Oxford and introduced the two men while Coleridge was on a walking tour with another friend, Joseph Hucks. Southey would later write "that meeting fixed the future fortunes of us both". Coleridge extended his stay in Oxford for several weeks while the two men discussed the problems of the time and the possibility of setting up a utopian society in the United States, which Coleridge first dubbed "Pantocracy" then "Pantisocracy". Allen and Southey's friend George Burnett were early allies and when Coleridge and Huck departed for Wales, Southey and Burnett accompanied them part of the way. On their return journey to Oxford, Southey and Burnett discussed the practicalities of the scheme.

Throughout July, Coleridge corresponded regularly with Southey about their plans (unfortunately, while many of Coleridge's letters to Southey have survived, only part of one of Southey's letters to Coleridge is known). Coleridge even went so far as to share his enthusiasm for Pantisocracy with many of the people he and Hucks met along the road, offending several listeners with their radical ideas. During the walking tour Coleridge also encountered an old flame, Mary Evans, and his interaction with her momentarily drove thoughts of Pantisocracy from his mind. On 3 August, Coleridge and Hucks rejoined Southey in Bristol.

In Bristol, Southey and Coleridge continued to flesh out their plans, and spoke openly of their radical ideas. One listener was John Poole, cousin of Tom Poole of Nether Stowey, who writes of his encounter with the two young men: "Each of them was shamefully hot with Democratic rage as regards politics, and both Infidel as to religion. I was extremely indignant...".

During this time the young men also became acquainted with the family of Mrs. Fricker, a widow whose daughters seemed willing to join in the scheme (as wives of Southey and Coleridge). Southey became interested in Edith and Coleridge began showing interest in Sara.

== Further planning and practical implications ==
In the autumn of 1794, Coleridge began seriously to investigate the practical problems of setting up a community in America. During this time he encountered George Dyer, a student familiar with Priestley (who at the time was already living in Pennsylvania), and also spoke with a land agent. In a letter to Southey on 6 September he writes:

[The land agent] says £2000 will do; that he doubts not we can contract for our passage under £400; that we shall buy the land a great deal cheaper when we arrive in American than we could do in England...That twelve men may easily clear 300 acres in four or five months; and that, for 600 dollars, a thousand acres may be cleared and houses built on them. He recommends the Susquehannah for its excessive beauty and its security from hostile Indians.

Neither Coleridge nor Southey possessed the requisite wealth, but plans were laid for a spring departure in 1795. The young men hoped that other, wealthier immigrants who would join in the endeavor would be willing to fund it. Returning to Cambridge in late September, Coleridge began to spread word of the plan.

Coleridge at this time envisioned the community including "twelve men with their families", among whom the costs would be split, with the wealthier members of the community making up for the shortcomings of the poorer members. Besides money, other practical issues arose. Having little ability in farming or carpentry, the young men planned to acquire these skills over the winter in time for a March departure. Among the families who were planning to make the voyage were children, and Coleridge worried that they might already be deeply prejudiced by society, which could subvert and corrupt the Pantisocracy.

== Disillusionment ==
As the date set for departure arrived and the financial difficulties in undertaking the journey remained unsolved, the would-be emigrants began to lose excitement and resolve. Besides their lack of funds, other concerns challenged the Pantisocrats. Contrary to the glowing travel narratives that Coleridge pored over while researching the prospect of settling in America, other accounts of American life were less encouraging, and described a difficult and laborious existence. In a review of Thomas Cooper's Some Information Respecting America, (one of the positive accounts of the New World that Coleridge consulted) a reviewer describes Cooper and those like him as "rival auctioneers, or rather show-men, stationed for the allurement of incautious passengers. 'Pray, ladies and gentlemen, walk in and admire the wonders of Kentucky—Pray, stop and see the incomparable beauties of the Susquehanna.'"

Coleridge also faced personal challenges in carrying out the scheme. He received a letter from Mary Evans which argued against the plan, and his feelings for her for a time swayed him against Pantisocracy. Learning that she had become engaged, Coleridge turned his attention back to Pantisocracy and Sara Fricker. Under pressure from Southey to act with regard to Sara (both because of the demands of Pantisocracy and also because she was being courted by other men), Coleridge married Sara in October 1795.

As plans bogged down, Southey and Coleridge eventually reached an impasse. Coleridge, Southey and Burnett shared rooms in Bristol but the meticulous Southey grew worried by Coleridge's lifestyle and feared that finances were being left under his responsibility (he contributed four times more to their common funds than his roommates). Southey at one point advocated taking servants to the new world, a proposition Coleridge scoffed at. Southey and other would-be Pantisocrats also considered a less ambitious plan: the purchase of a common farm in Wales. Coleridge, still dreaming of the new world, felt that this compromise failed to meet the standards of Pantisocracy. In a letter to Southey he complains that private resources would not be abandoned at the farm in Wales and that, "In short, we were to commence partners in a petty farming trade." By the winter of 1795, the dream of Pantisocracy had all but died out.

== Impact on Coleridge ==
There are two of Coleridge's poems that directly address the plans he and Southey were envisioning. "Pantisocracy", a sonnet sent to Southey in a letter of 18 September 1794, was not published during Coleridge's lifetime. A second sonnet, "On the Prospect of Establishing a Pantisocracy", has also been attributed to Coleridge, and was first published in 1826. Many of Coleridge's other works of the time implicitly suggest the New World, and may owe a debt to his musings over the Susquehanna. An early version of the poem "To a Young Ass" also makes mention of Pantisocracy.

Pantisocracy presented Coleridge a practical outlet for ideas he had previously only considered theoretically. While the scheme never produced an actual community, it did impact Coleridge's philosophical thinking. His lectures of the time reflect his Pantisocratic thinking on social relations and wealth. He wrote of the scheme years afterward that it was "a plan as harmless as it was extravagant" but it can be argued that much of the fantastic imagery and political thoughts present in his work owe a debt both to Pantisocracy and to the research he conducted in preparation for his voyage. On a literal level, perhaps the greatest impact Pantisocracy had on the young Coleridge was the addition of Sara Fricker (and their subsequent family) to his life.
