= Robert Southey =

English romantic poet (1774–1843)

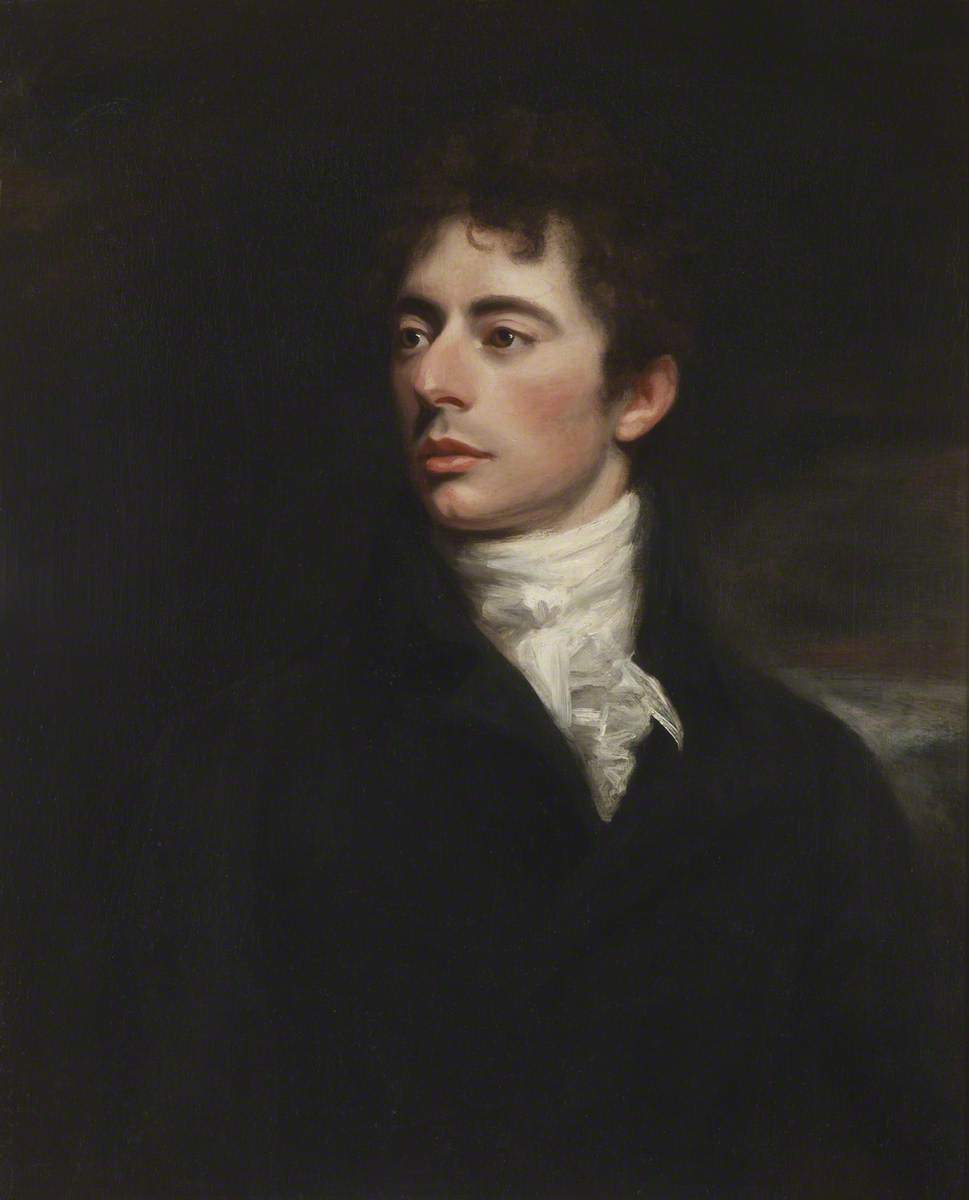
- Portrait of Robert Southey by John Opie, 1806

Poet Laureate of the United Kingdom
- In office 12 August 1813 – 21 March 1843
- Monarchs: George III; George IV; William IV; Victoria
- Preceded by: Henry James Pye
- Succeeded by: William Wordsworth

Personal details
- Born: 12 August 1774 Bristol, England
- Died: 21 March 1843 (aged 68) London, England
- Spouses: Edith Fricker (1795–1838; her death); Caroline Anne Bowles (1839–1843; his death)
- Education: Balliol College, Oxford
- Occupation: Poet, historian, biographer and essayist

Robert Southey (/ˈsaʊði, ˈsʌði/; (Note: Southey's biographer comment: "There should be no doubt as to the proper pronunciation of the name: 'Sowthey'. The poet himself complained that people in the North would call him 'Mr Suthy'" (Jack Simmons: Southey (London: Collins, 1945), p. 9). Byron rhymed Southey with "mouthy" (Don Juan Canto the First, Stanza 205) Retrieved 12 August 2012. The pronunciation Southey objected to is still used; the Oxford English Dictionary cites both for "Southeyan" (relating to Southey or his work).) 12 August 1774 – 21 March 1843) was an English poet of the Romantic school, and Poet Laureate from 1813 until his death. Like the other Lake Poets, William Wordsworth and Samuel Taylor Coleridge, Southey began as a radical but became steadily more conservative as he gained respect for Britain and its institutions. Other romantics such as Byron accused him of siding with the establishment for money and status. He is remembered especially for the poem "After Blenheim" and the original version of "Goldilocks and the Three Bears".

== Life ==
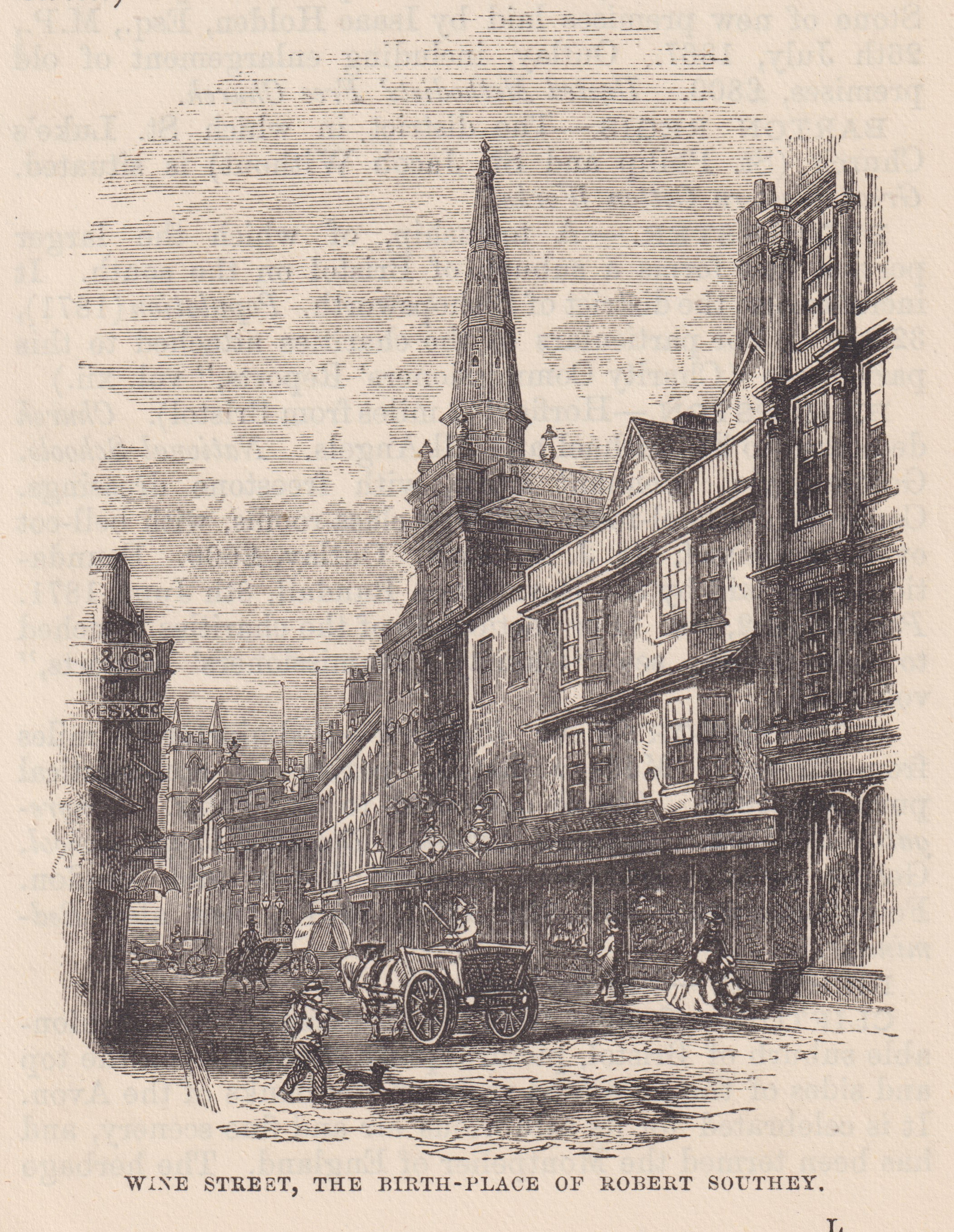
Wine Street, Bristol (1872)

Robert Southey was born in Wine Street, Bristol, to Robert Southey and Margaret Hill. He was educated at Westminster School, London (where he was expelled for writing an article in The Flagellant, a magazine he originated, attributing the invention of flogging to the Devil), and at Balliol College, Oxford.

Southey went to Oxford with "a heart full of poetry and feeling, a head full of Rousseau and Werther, and my religious principles shaken by Gibbon". He later said of Oxford, "All I learnt was a little swimming... and a little boating". He did, however, write a play, Wat Tyler (which, in 1817, after he became Poet Laureate, was published, to embarrass him, by his enemies). Experimenting with a writing partnership with Samuel Taylor Coleridge, most notably in their joint composition of The Fall of Robespierre, Southey published his first collection of poems in 1794. The same year, Southey, Coleridge, Robert Lovell and several others discussed creating an idealistic community ("pantisocracy") on the banks of the Susquehanna River in America.

In 1795 he married Edith Fricker, whose sister Sara married Coleridge. The same year, he travelled to Portugal, and wrote Joan of Arc, published in 1796. He then wrote many ballads, went to Spain in 1800, and on his return settled in the Lake District.

In 1799, Southey and Coleridge were involved with early experiments with nitrous oxide (laughing gas), conducted by the Cornish scientist Humphry Davy.

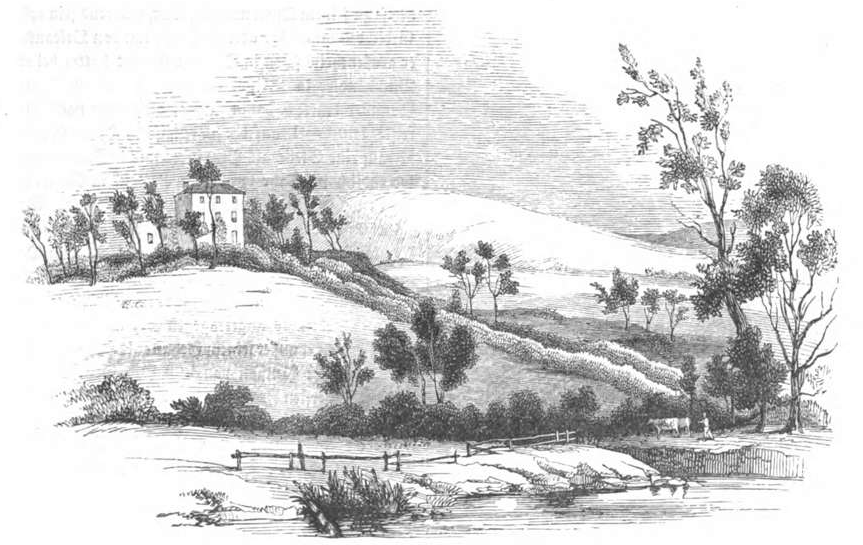
Greta Hall, Keswick

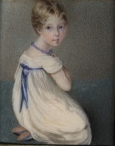
Mary Matilda Betham, Portrait of Edith May Southey, 1809

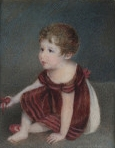
Mary Matilda Betham, Portrait of Herbert, 1809

While writing prodigiously, he received a government pension in 1807, and in 1809 started a long association with the Quarterly Review, which provided almost his only income for most of his life. He was appointed laureate in 1813, a post he came greatly to dislike.

In 1819 Southey accompanied the Scottish civil engineer Thomas Telford, whom Southey nicknamed the “Colossus of Roads” on a tour of inspection of Telford’s works in Scotland. These included the Caledonian Canal (which would open three years later) and a number of Telford's roads, bridges, and harbour works. Southey’s account of the tour, Journal of a Tour in Scotland in 1819, gives detailed descriptions of Telford’s engineering projects and records Southey’s own impressions of the Scottish landscape and people.

In 1821, Southey wrote A Vision of Judgment, to commemorate George III, in the preface to which he attacked Byron who, as well as responding with a parody, The Vision of Judgment (see below), mocked him frequently in Don Juan.

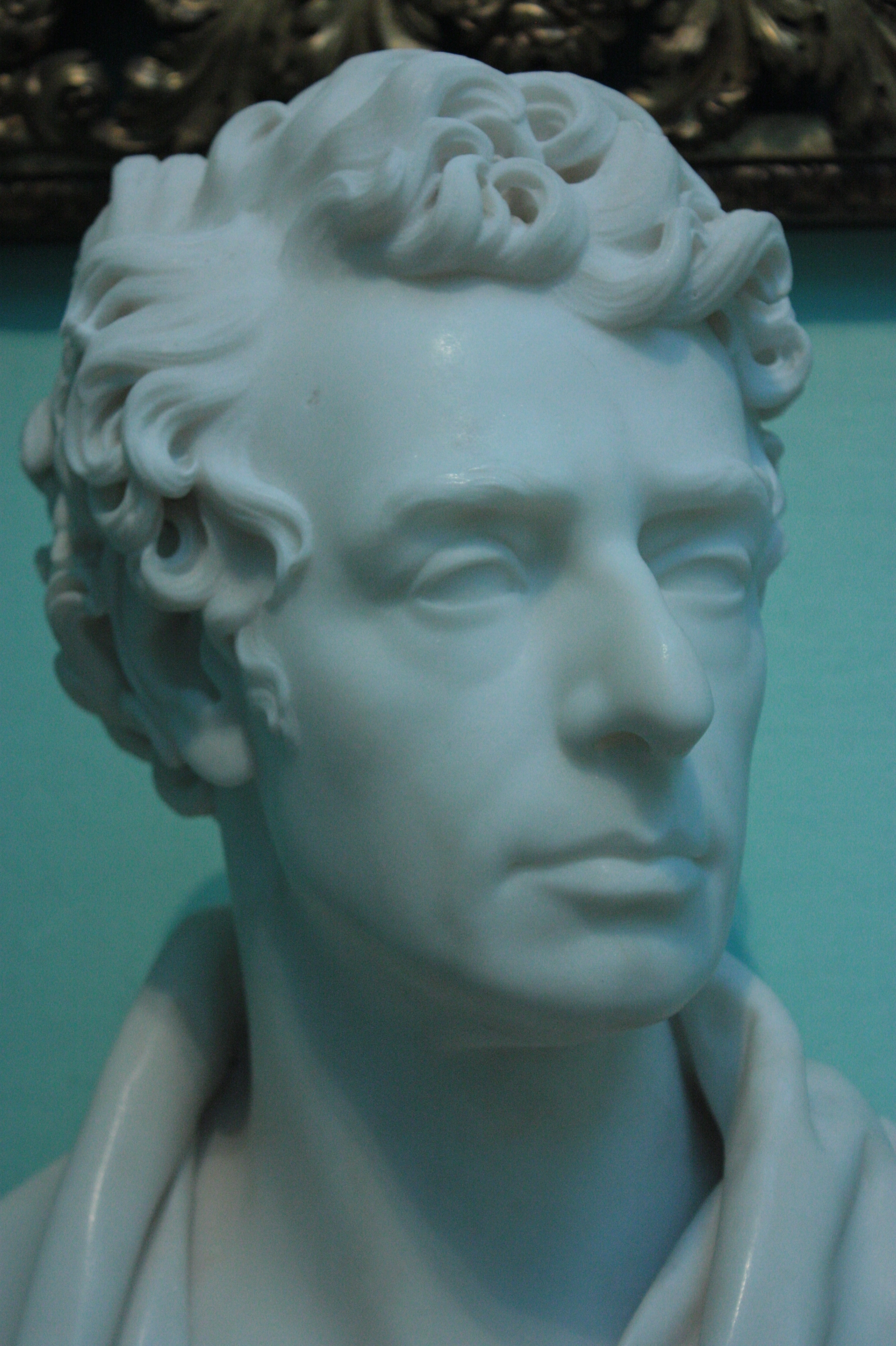
Robert Southey, by Sir Francis Chantrey, 1832, National Portrait Gallery, London

In 1837, Edith died, and Southey remarried, to Caroline Anne Bowles, also a poet, on 4 June 1839. The marriage broke down, not least because of his increasing dementia. His mind was giving way when he wrote a last letter to his friend Walter Savage Landor in 1839, but he continued to mention Landor's name when generally incapable of mentioning anyone. He died on 21 March 1843 and was buried in the churchyard of Crosthwaite Church, Keswick, where he had worshipped for forty years. There is a memorial to him inside the church, with an epitaph written by his friend William Wordsworth.

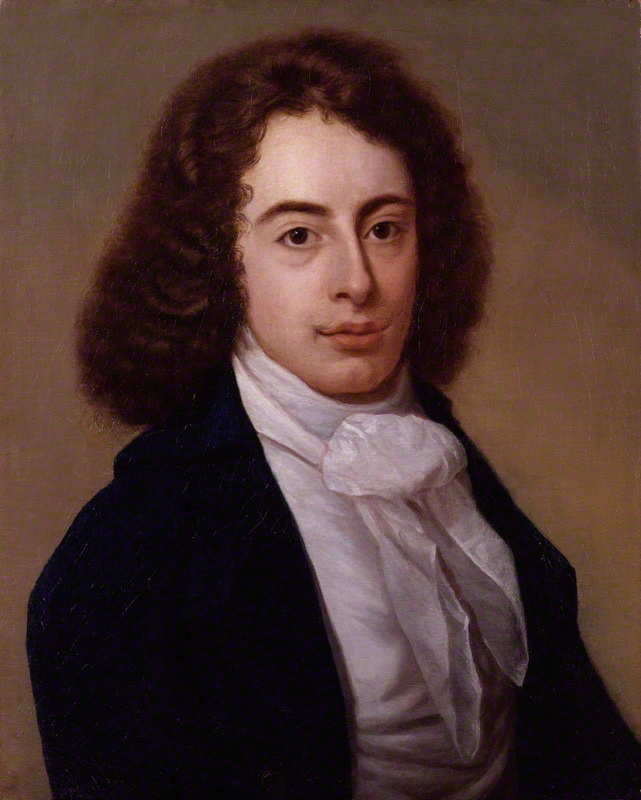
Peter Vandyke, Portrait of Robert Southey, Aged 21, 1795

Southey was also a prolific letter writer, literary scholar, essay writer, historian and biographer. His biographies include the life and works of John Bunyan, John Wesley, William Cowper, Oliver Cromwell and Horatio Nelson. The last has rarely been out of print since its publication in 1813 and was adapted as the 1926 British film Nelson.

He was a generous man, particularly kind to Coleridge's abandoned family, but he incurred the enmity of many, including Hazlitt as well as Byron, who felt he had betrayed his principles in accepting pensions and the laureateship, and in retracting his youthful ideals.

== Politics ==
Although originally a radical supporter of the French Revolution, Southey followed the trajectory of his fellow Romantic poets Wordsworth and Coleridge towards conservatism. Embraced by the Tory establishment as Poet Laureate, and from 1807 in receipt of a yearly stipend from them, he vigorously supported the Liverpool government. He argued against parliamentary reform ("the railroad to ruin with the Devil for driver"), blamed the Peterloo Massacre on an allegedly revolutionary "rabble" killed and injured by government troops, and spurned Catholic emancipation. In 1817 he privately proposed penal transportation for those guilty of "libel" or "sedition". He had in mind figures like Thomas Jonathan Wooler and William Hone, whose prosecution he urged. Such writers were guilty, he wrote in the Quarterly Review, of "inflaming the turbulent temper of the manufacturer and disturbing the quiet attachment of the peasant to those institutions under which he and his fathers have dwelt in peace." Wooler and Hone were acquitted, but the threats caused another target, William Cobbett, to emigrate temporarily to the United States.

In some respects, Southey was ahead of his time in his views on social reform. For example, he was an early critic of the evils the new factory system brought to early 19th-century Britain. He was appalled by the living conditions in towns like Birmingham and Manchester and especially by employment of children in factories and outspoken about them. He sympathised with the pioneering socialist plans of Robert Owen, advocated that the state promote public works to maintain high employment, and called for universal education.

Given his departure from radicalism, and his attempts to have former fellow travellers prosecuted, it is unsurprising that less successful contemporaries who kept the faith attacked Southey. They saw him as selling out for money and respectability.

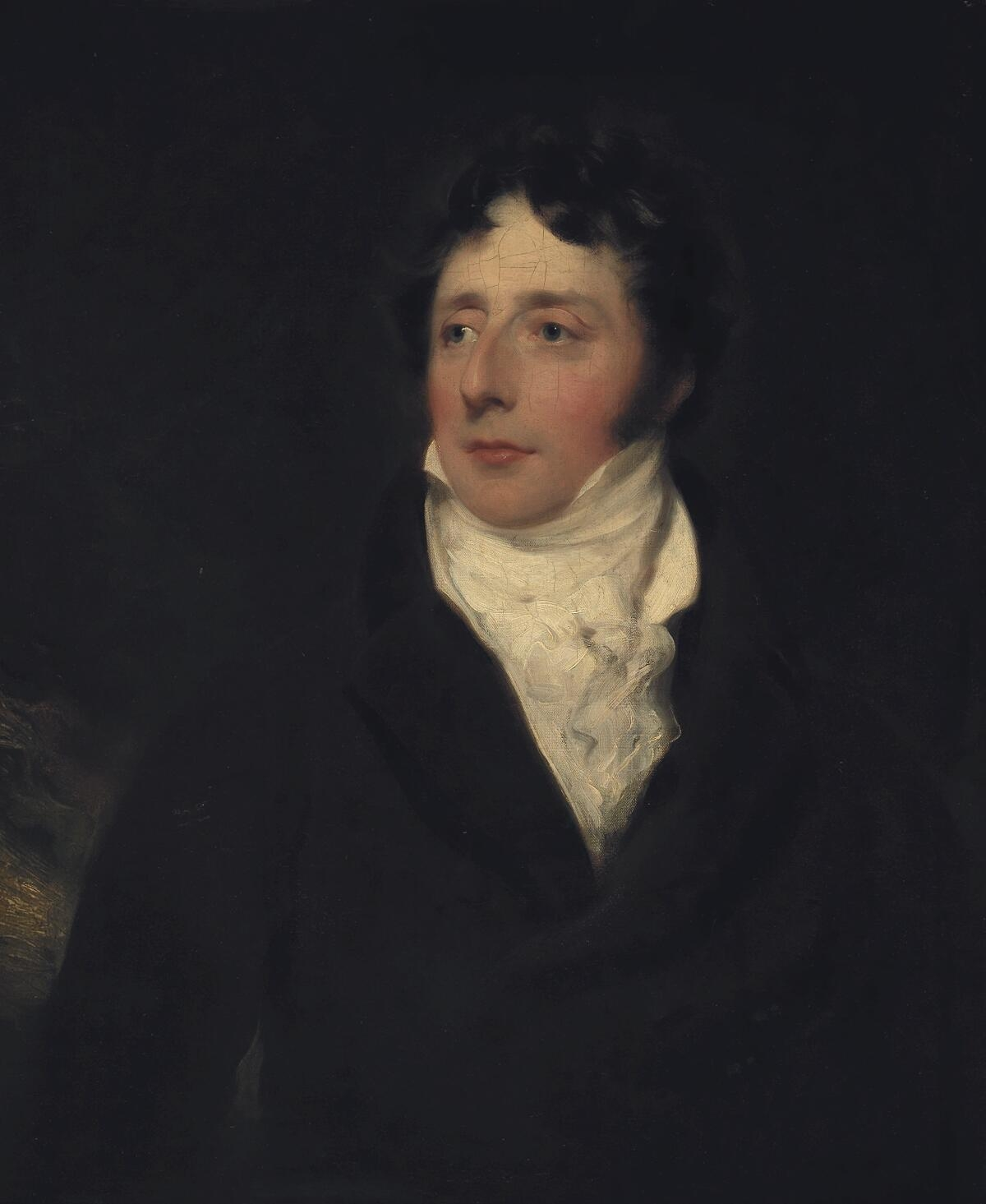
Portrait by Thomas Lawrence, c. 1810

In 1817, Southey was confronted with the surreptitious publication of a radical play, Wat Tyler, which he had written in 1794 at the height of his radical period. This was instigated by his enemies in an attempt to embarrass the Poet Laureate and highlight his apostasy from radical poet to supporter of the Tory establishment. One of his most savage critics was William Hazlitt. In his portrait of Southey, in The Spirit of the Age, he wrote: "He wooed Liberty as a youthful lover, but it was perhaps more as a mistress than a bride; and he has since wedded with an elderly and not very reputable lady, called Legitimacy." Southey largely ignored his critics but was forced to defend himself when William Smith, a member of Parliament, rose in the House of Commons on 14 March to attack him. In a spirited response Southey wrote an open letter to the MP, in which he explained that he had always aimed at lessening human misery and bettering the condition of all the lower classes and that he had only changed in respect of "the means by which that amelioration was to be effected." As he put it, "that as he learnt to understand the institutions of his country, he learnt to appreciate them rightly, to love, and to revere, and to defend them."

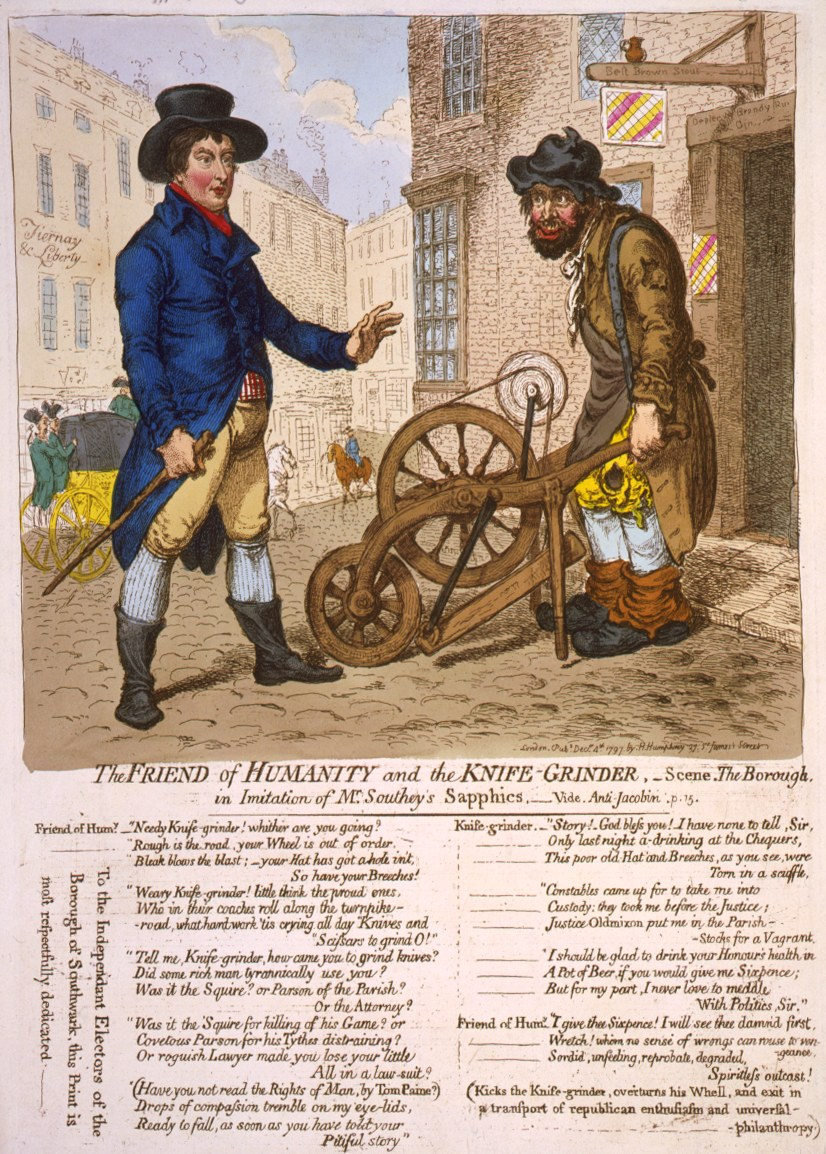
A 1797 caricature of Southey's early radical poetry

Another critic of Southey in his later period was Thomas Love Peacock, who scorned him in the character of Mr. Feathernest in his 1817 satirical novel Melincourt.

He was often mocked for what were seen as sycophantic odes to the king, notably in Byron's long ironic dedication of Don Juan to Southey. In the poem Southey is dismissed as insolent, narrow and shabby. This was based both on Byron's lack of respect for Southey's literary talent, and his disdain for what he perceived as Southey's hypocritical turn to conservatism later in life. Much of the animosity between the two men can be traced back to Byron's belief that Southey had spread rumours about him and Percy Bysshe Shelley being in a "League of Incest" during their time on Lake Geneva in 1816, an accusation that Southey strenuously denied.

In response, Southey attacked what he called the Satanic School among modern poets in the preface to his poem, A Vision of Judgement, written after the death of George III. While not naming Byron, it was clearly directed at him. Byron retaliated with The Vision of Judgment, a parody of Southey's poem.

Without his prior knowledge, the Earl of Radnor, an admirer of his work, had Southey returned as MP for the latter's pocket borough seat of Downton in Wiltshire at the 1826 general election, as an opponent of Catholic emancipation, but Southey refused to sit, causing a by-election in December that year, pleading that he did not have a large enough estate to support him through political life, or want to take on the hours full attendance required. He wished to continue living in the Lake District and preferred to defend the Church of England in writing rather than speech. He declared that "for me to change my scheme of life and go into Parliament, would be to commit a moral and intellectual suicide." His friend John Rickman, a Commons clerk, noted that "prudential reasons would forbid his appearing in London" as a member.

In 1835, Southey declined the offer of a baronetcy, but accepted a life pension of £300 a year from Prime Minister Sir Robert Peel.

== Reputation ==
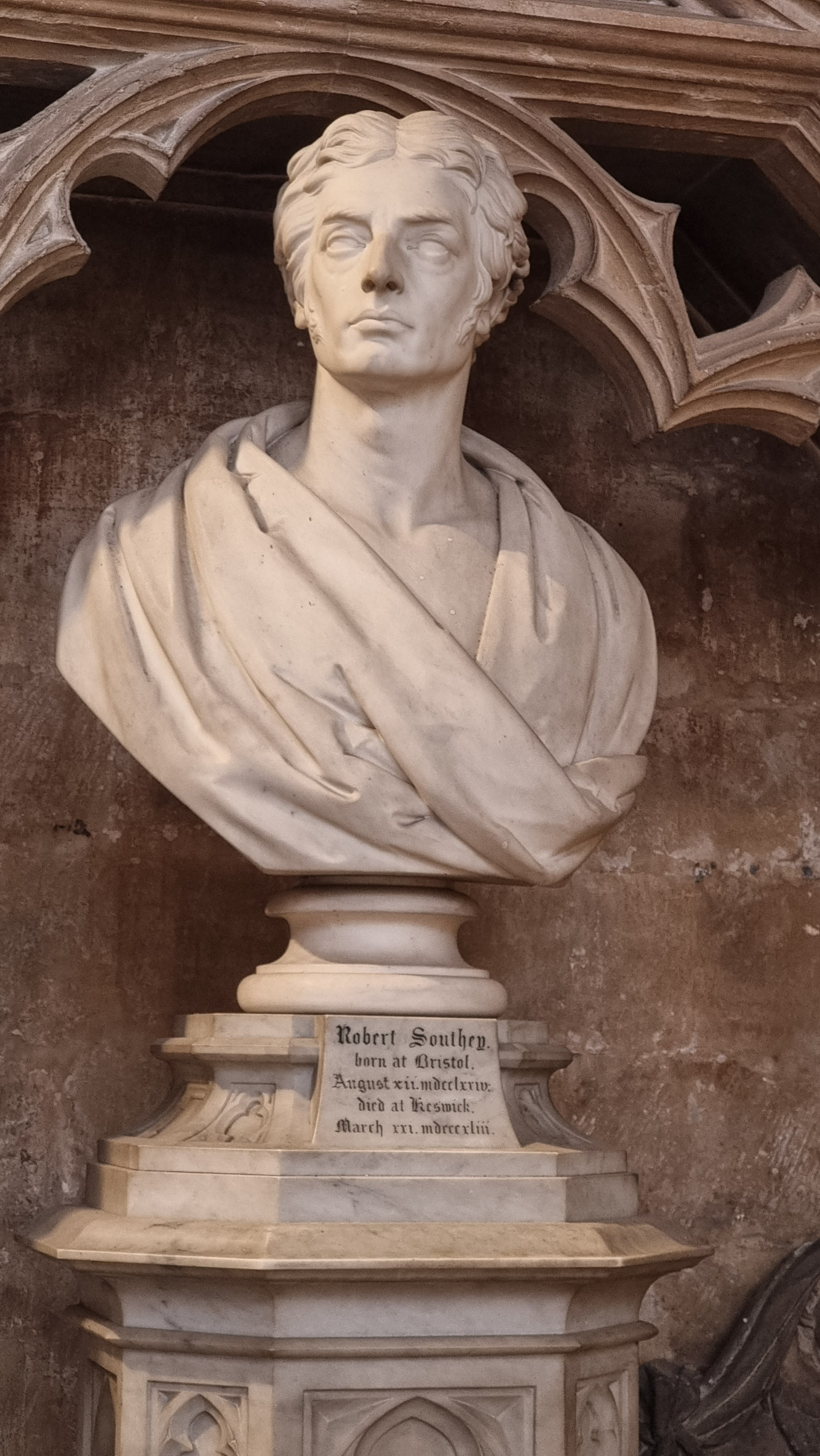
Bust of Southey created by Edward Hodges Baily in 1845, Bristol Cathedral

Charles Lamb, in a letter to Coleridge, stated, "With Joan of Arc I have been delighted, amazed. I had not presumed to expect of any thing of such excellence from Southey. Why the poem is alone sufficient to redeem the character of the age we live in from the imputation of degenerating in Poetry [...] On the whole, I expect Southey one day to rival Milton."

Regarding Thalaba the Destroyer, Ernest Bernhard-Kabisch pointed out that "Few readers have been as enthusiastic about it as Cardinal Newman who considered it the most 'morally sublime' of English poems. But the young Shelley reckoned it his favourite poem, and both he and Keats followed its lead in some of their verse narratives."

While Southey was writing Madoc, Coleridge believed that the poem would be superior to the Aeneid.

Robert Southey had a notable influence on Russian literature. Pushkin highly appreciated his work and translated the beginning of the Hymn to the Penates and Madoc, and was also inspired by the plot of Roderick to create an original poem on the same plot (Родрик). At the beginning of the 20th century, Southey was translated by Gumilyov and Lozinsky. In 1922, the publishing house "Vsemirnaya Literatura" published the first separate edition of Southey's ballads in Russia, compiled by Gumilyov. In 2006, a bilingual edition prepared by E. Witkowski was published, a significant part of which included new translations.

Southey was elected a member of the American Antiquarian Society in 1822. He was also a member of the Royal Spanish Academy.

== In popular culture ==
- In the video game Book of Hours, released in 2023 by Weather Factory, the Southey family are good friends with the fictional Baroness Eva Dewulf, and there are rumours that they adopted her illegitimate child as Abra Southey and presented her as the younger sister to Robert.

== Partial list of works ==
- Harold, or, The Castle of Morford (an unpublished Robin Hood novel that Southey wrote in 1791).
- The Fall of Robespierre (1794) (with Samuel Taylor Coleridge)
- Poems: Containing the Retrospect, Odes, Elegies, Sonnets, &c. (with Robert Lovell)
- Joan of Arc (1796)
- Icelandic Poetry, or The Edda of Sæmund (contributing an introductory epistle to A. S. Cottle's translations, 1797)
- Letters Written During a Short Residence in Spain and Portugal (1797)
- St. Patrick's Purgatory (1798)
- After Blenheim (1798)
- The Amatory Poems of Abel Shufflebottom, (1799)
- The Devil's Thoughts (1799). Revised ed. pub. in 1827 as "The Devil's Walk". (with Samuel Taylor Coleridge)
- English Eclogues (1799)
- The Old Man's Comforts and How He Gained Them (1799)
- The full text of Poems, vols. I & II at Wikisource (1799)
- Thalaba the Destroyer (1801)
- The Inchcape Rock (1802)
- Madoc (1805)
- Letters from England: By Don Manuel Alvarez Espriella (1807), the observations of a fictitious Spaniard.
- Chronicle of the Cid, from the Spanish (1808)
- The Curse of Kehama (1810)
- History of Brazil (3 vols.) (1810–1819)
- The Life of Horatio, Lord Viscount Nelson (1813)
- Roderick the Last of the Goths (1814)
- Journal of a tour in the Netherlands in the autumn of 1815 (1902)
- Sir Thomas Malory's Le Morte D'Arthur (1817)
- Wat Tyler: A Dramatic Poem (1817; written in 1794)
- Journal of a Tour in Scotland in 1819 (1929 ed.)
- Cataract of Lodore (1820)
- The Life of Wesley; and Rise and Progress of Methodism (2 vols.) (1820)
- What Are Little Boys Made Of? (1813)
- The Expedition of Orsua; and the Crimes of Aguirre (1821)
- A Vision of Judgement (1821)
- History of the Peninsular War, 1807–1814 (3 vols.) (1823–1832)
- A Tale of Paraguay (1825)
- Sir Thomas More; or, Colloquies on the Progress and Prospects of Society (1829)
- The Works of William Cowper, 15 vols., ed. (1833–1837)
- Lives of the British Admirals, with an Introductory View of the Naval History of England (5 vols.) (1833–40); republished as "English Seamen" in 1895.
- "The Doctor (7 vols.) (1834–1847)". Includes The Story of the Three Bears (1837).
- The Poetical Works of Robert Southey, Collected by Himself (1837)

== See also ==
- Recollections of the Lake Poets
- Goldilocks and the Three Bears
- Lake Poets

== Sources ==
- Geoffrey Carnall, Writers and Their Works: Robert Southey, London: Longman Group, 1971
- Basil Cottle, Robert Southey and Bristol (Bristol Historical Association pamphlets, no. 47, 1980), 30 pp.
- Kenneth Curry, ed., New Letters of Robert Southey, 2 vols, New York/London: Columbia UP, 1965
- Edward Dowden, ed., The Correspondence of Robert Southey with Caroline Bowles, Dublin/London, 1881
- Dennis Low, The Literary Protégées of the Lake Poets, Aldershot: Ashgate, 2006
- John Lionel Madden, Robert Southey: the critical heritage, London: Routledge & Kegan Paul, 1972
- Michael Nash, Southey's Nelson. Bibliography of the 1813–1857 English Editions of Robert Southey's Life of Nelson, Hoylake & Tattenhall/Marine & Cannon Books, 2019
- Lynda Pratt, ed., Robert Southey, Poetical Works, 1793–1810, 5 vols, London: Pickering and Chatto, 2004
- Jack Simmons, Southey, Washington DC: Kennikat, 1945
- Charles Cuthbert Southey, ed., The Life and Correspondence of Robert Southey, New York, 1855
- W. A. Speck, Robert Southey: Entire Man of Letters, Yale University Press, 2006
- Stephen, Leslie (1902). "Southey's Letters" . Studies of a Biographer. London: Duckworth and Co. pp. 45–85.

Court offices
Preceded by Henry James Pye	British Poet Laureate; 1813–1843	Succeeded by William Wordsworth
