= Thorne and Hatfield Moors Peat Canals =

Canals in England

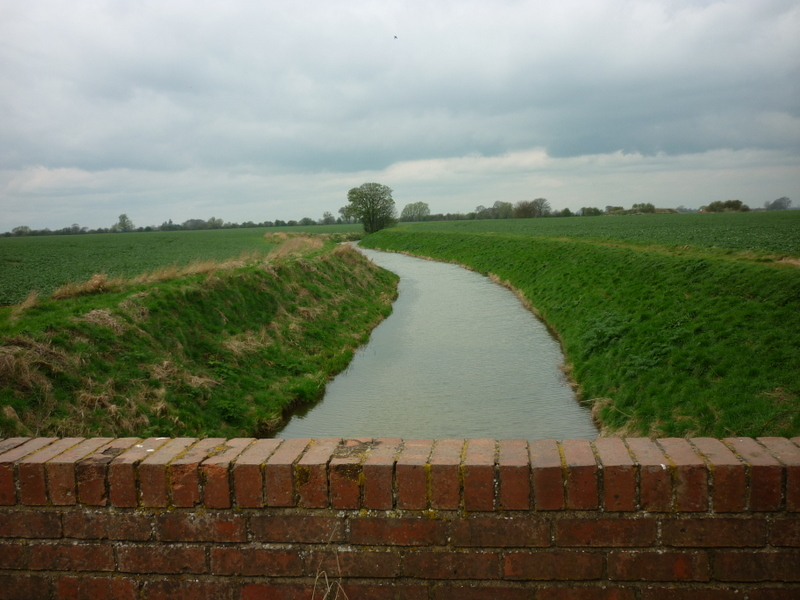
- Boating Dike near Jaques Bank, Dirtness. Its name derives from its use as a canal prior to the 1830s.

Specifications
- Status: parts now act as drains

History
- Date of act: Privately built
- Date of first use: 1630s and 1890s
- Date closed: 1830s and 1922

Geography
- Start point: Thorne Moors

Thorne and Hatfield Moors Peat Canals were a series of canals in South Yorkshire and Lincolnshire, England, which were used to carry cut peat from Thorne and Hatfield Moors to points where it could be processed or exported. There were two phases to the canals, the first of which lasted from the 1630s until the 1830s when coal imported on the Stainforth and Keadby Canal reduced the demand for peat as a fuel. The second started in the 1890s when peat found a new use as bedding for working horses and lasted until 1922 when Moorends Mill which processed the peat was destroyed by fire.

== History ==
The canals were located in Hatfield Chase, an area of low-lying land which was regularly waterlogged prior to the 1630s. In 1626, the Dutch drainage engineer Cornelius Vermuyden was appointed by King Charles I to reclaim the Chase, and set about re-routing the River Don, so that it ran along the western edge of the Chase, and the River Idle, which he diverted along its southern edge. The River Torne was then left with no outlet, and a new channel was cut for it, which crossed the Chase to join the River Trent There were some problems with the outlet of the Don and the new channel for the Torne, and considerable local dissent, which resulted in civil unrest and deliberate re-flooding of the land, which was not finally resolved until 1719. Gradually, much of the Chase became suitable for agriculture. The drainage did not affect the two great raised mires or peat bogs, known as Thorne and Hatfield Moors.

Peat from the moors was used as a domestic fuel, but was also exported further afield. Precise dates for the first peat canals are uncertain, but soon after the construction of the diverted River Don, a canal was cut, which crossed the Chase to reach the Trent. A plan of the area, dated 1752, shows The Cutt by Thorne into Trent, and significantly, parts of it are still called Boating Dike on modern Ordnance Survey maps. A second canal on the western side of the moors, also called Boating Dike, ran past Thorne to join the River Don, and included a pound lock part way along it. Some 30 or 40 boats were using the canal in the 1790s, although the turves were transferred to larger vessels for onward passage along the Don. The canals were shown of a map of Yorkshire, produced by the cartographer Thomas Jefferys between 1767 and 1770.

The hydrology of the region was altered in 1802 with the opening of the Stainforth and Keadby Canal, which cut across Hatfield Chase in an east-west direction, with Thorne Moors to the north and Hatfield Moors to the south. Much of the Thorne boating dike was destroyed, and new drains were cut parallel to the canal. A new 2-mile (3.2 km) navigable drain was sanctioned by the Hatfield, Thorne and Fishlake Enclosure Commissioners, which ran along the southern section of Thorne Moors. There were then some 6 miles (9.7 km) of navigable drains, on which clinker-built boats operated. They were 28 by 6 feet (8.5 by 1.8 m), and were symmetrical in shape, allowing them to be worked in either direction without having to turn them. Coal brought into the region by the Stainforth and Keadby Canal led to a fall in the demand for peat as a fuel. The number of boats operating on the peat canals had declined to 8 or 9 by the 1820s, and such traffic ceased altogether around 1830. Peat for export from the moors was taken to the Stainforth and Keadby Canal by cart.

=== Second phase ===
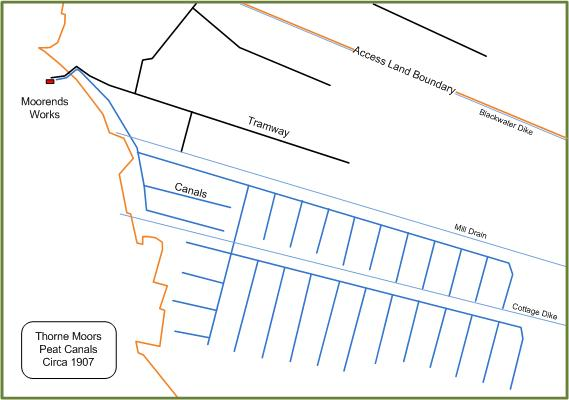
The Peat Canals circa 1907, which supplied peat to Moorends Works. The access land boundary is recent. Blackwater Dike, Mill Drain and Cottage Dike still exist and are named on the 2006 1:25,000 Ordnance Survey map.

Following the demise of the canals, the emphasis was on improving the moors for agriculture by warping, a process that involved spreading silt over the peat to produce a soil that could sustain agriculture. The Thorne Moor (Waste) Improvement Act was passed in 1848, which created the Thorne Moor Improvement Company, which was responsible for draining, warping or otherwise improving Thorne Waste, the southern section of the moors. The plans were tied into those for a railway link between Gainsborough, Thorne and Doncaster, authorised in the same year, but the Great Northern Railway Company failed to build the line, and little improvement was achieved.

Two other schemes deserve mention. The first was for Swinefleet Warping Drain, to the east of the moors, the first part of which opened in 1821. It had been promoted by Ralph Creyke and T.H.S. Sotheron, who had obtained an Act of Parliament, and they succeeded in using the silt-rich water to flood the land and gradually improve it over the next forty years. Makin Durham built the Durham Warping Drain on the western edge of the moors, but although it opened in 1856, very little reclamation took place. He died in 1882, just as ideas for using the peat, rather than improving it for agriculture, were developing. The change occurred because there was an agricultural depression, and a need for an alternative to straw bedding for a large number of working horses in the country.

Sections of both Hatfield Moors and Thorne Moors were leased to companies for peat cutting. The Hatfield Chase Moss Litter Company began cutting on Hatfield Moors in 1888. The Dutch Griendtsveen Moss Litter Company was formed in 1893 and started to acquire various peat businesses. They took over the works at Moorends, to the north of Thorne, and imported workers from the Netherlands. They brought their own tools and methods of working with them, and by 1899, there was a colony of around 300 Dutch people at Moorends, of which 120 were men working on the moors. They rebuilt the Moorends mill, and built around 14 miles (23 km) of canals to carry the peat from the moors to the mill. Ledgers in the offices were kept in Dutch and English, and there was some tension with the local population, who feared that such a large influx of foreigners might result in them losing their own jobs.

The boats used on the system were about 40 feet (12 m) long, with a flat bottom and, like the earlier wooden boats, were pointed at both ends, so that they did not have to be turned. They were made of iron in the Netherlands, and then transported to Thorne. There were twelve boats on the system, which were manhandled on the side arms, where the peat was cut, and pulled by two horses on the longer sections back to the mill. Towpaths beside the canals were made from limestone. From the cutting fields, the main canal headed north-west, and then turned to the west to reach Moorends Works. It crossed Durham's Warping Drain on an iron aqueduct, which required large amounts of brickwork to support it. It was completed at great cost in 1895, and also carried the 3 ft (914 mm) gauge tramway which served the northern part of the moors.

In 1896, the British Peat Moss Litter Company was formed by the amalgamation of the Hatfield Chase Peat Moss Litter Company and most of the companies working on Thorne Moors. They paid £58,000 for Griendtsveen's Moorends Works. The mill, which had been used for the production of paraffin since the late 1860s until its rebuilding in the 1880s, was damaged by a fire in 1898. The wooden baling presses were destroyed, but were replaced with steel presses, which were powered by a 40-horsepower (30 kW) stationary steam engine which burned peat as its fuel. Besides the canals and the aqueduct, the 1906 Ordnance Survey maps show two swing bridges, one on the northern section just beyond the junction where the line for the southern section turned off, and another where that line crossed the Cottage Dike. There was also a wind pump between the Cottage Dike and the southern canals, towards the eastern end of the canals. Marked towpaths ran along the northern edge of both sections of the canals and on the north-easterly side of the canal to the aqueduct and Mooorends Mill.

There were intermittent problems with water supply for the canals, which also suffered from silting, and there were times when the only supply of peat for processing to the mill was from the tramways. They remained in use until 1922, when another fire destroyed the main mill building. The boats were cut up for scrap, and with no use, the canals reverted to bog. The works chimney was demolished in 1930, but the remaining buildings became a maintenance workshop. The tramway wagons were repaired there until 1956, after which the site was demolished.

== See also ==
- Hatfield Chase for details of land drainage
- Thorne and Hatfield Moors for details of peat extraction and gas storage

== Bibliography ==
- Booth, Adrian (1998). The Peat Railways of Thorne and Hatfield Moors. Industrial Railway Society. ISBN 978-1-90155604-9.
- Hadfield, Charles (1972). The Canals of Yorkshire and North East England (Vol 1). David and Charles. ISBN 978-0-7153-5719-4.
- Hadfield, Charles (1973). The Canals of Yorkshire and North East England (Vol 2). David and Charles. ISBN 978-0-7153-5975-4.
- Limbert, Martin; Roworth, Peter C. (2009). Mechanised Peat Winning and Transportation on Thorne Moors (2nd Ed). Thorne & Hatfield Moors Conservation Forum. ISSN 1468-2087.
- Van de Noort, Robert (2001). "Thorne Moors: a contested wetland in north-eastern England" (PDF). The Heritage Management of Wetlands in Europe. Brussels: EAC: 133–140. Archived (PDF) from the original on 26 October 2018.
