= Thorne and Hatfield Moors =

Lowland raised peat bog in England

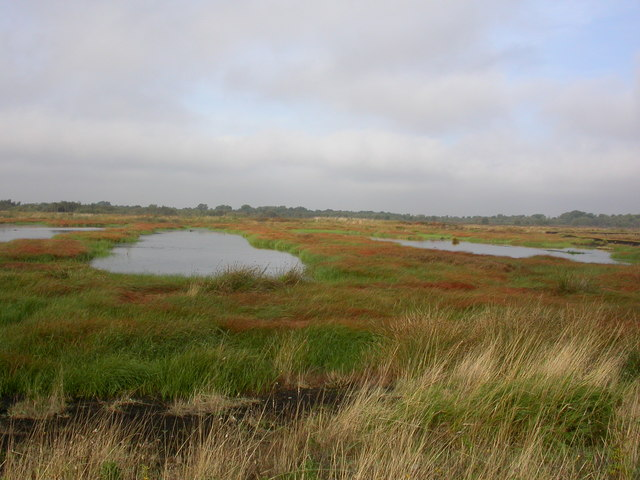
- Re-flooded peat workings on Thorne Moors form part of the Humberhead Peatlands National Nature Reserve

- Location within South Yorkshire
- Location: North-east and east of Doncaster, South Yorkshire, England
- OS grid: SE723151
- Coordinates: 53°38′N 0°55′W
- Area: 8,090 acres (32.7 km^{2})

Thorne and Hatfield Moors form the largest area of lowland raised peat bog in the United Kingdom. They are situated in South Yorkshire, to the north-east and east of Doncaster near the town of Thorne, and are part of Hatfield Chase. They had been used for small-scale extraction of peat for fuel from medieval times, and probably much earlier, but commercial extraction of the peat for animal bedding began in the 1880s. The peat was cut on the moors and, once it had dried, transported to several works on 3 ft (914 mm) narrow gauge tramways, locally called trams. The wagons were pulled by horses to works at Creyke's Siding, Moorends, Medge Hall, Swinefleet and Hatfield. There was also a network of canals supplying the Moorends Works.

The industry suffered a downturn between the two world wars, as working horses were replaced by lorries and peat demand dropped, but after the Second World War peat was used by the horticultural industry in increasing volumes, and harvesting expanded again. From 1947, experiments were made with locomotives on the tramways, and they soon replaced horses. A total of 23 had worked on the system by the time it was closed down. The extraction process was mechanised in the 1960s, with the introduction of machines that could cut and stack the peat turves. In 1981 mechanical loading of the turves into the trains was introduced. Surface milling of the peat was introduced in 1985, which completely stripped the surface of large areas of the moors.

Some environmental bodies considered the moors to be worthless, but tireless campaigning by William Bunting after the Second World War, culminating in direct action by a group known as Bunting's Beavers in 1972, resulted in a change of policy. The nature of the moor habitat has gradually been recognised as an ecological resource. From 1971 the Lincolnshire Wildlife Trust has managed a small area of Crowle Moor for conservation, and the Nature Conservancy Council bought another small area in 1985. A major change occurred in 1994, when Fisons company gave English Nature 2,340 acres (946 ha) of moorland, although they retained the right to continue extracting peat on some of it. By 2002, Scotts owned the cutting rights but most cutting of peat effectively ended in 2001, since the government buy-out in 2002 of the extraction rights from Scotts occurred before the cutting season had begun. Removal of peat stockpiled on the moors continued into 2006. Since then the moors have been managed as a National Nature Reserve by Natural England. Scotts still have a works at Hatfield, which processes imported peat.

In addition to the peat industry Hatfield Moor has been the site of part of the UK gas industry since 1981. Hatfield Moor gas field was discovered accidentally while drilling for oil, and a major blow-out and fire occurred. Gas was extracted from 1986 to 1998, and when the gas field became depleted, it was reused to become the first onshore gas storage facility of its kind in Britain.

Both Hatfield Moor and Thorne, Crowle and Goole Moor are designated as biological sites of Special Scientific Interest. Among several rare species they include the mire pill beetle, first discovered in Britain on Thorne Moor, and now only known to exist within the two SSSIs.

== Location ==
Thorne Moors and Hatfield Moors together cover an area of some 8,090 acres (3,270 ha), and are a small remnant of a much larger wetland system that once covered around 770 square miles (2,000 km^{2}) known as the Humberhead Levels. The moors lie to the east of the town of Thorne and the M18 motorway. Thorne Moors are situated to the north of the Stainforth and Keadby Canal and the M180 motorway, while Hatfield Moors lie to the south of the canal and road.

Thorne Moors are also called Swinefleet Moors, and both terms describe Crowle Moor, Goole Moor, Rawcliffe Moor, Snaith and Cowick Moor, and Thorne Waste collectively.

== History ==
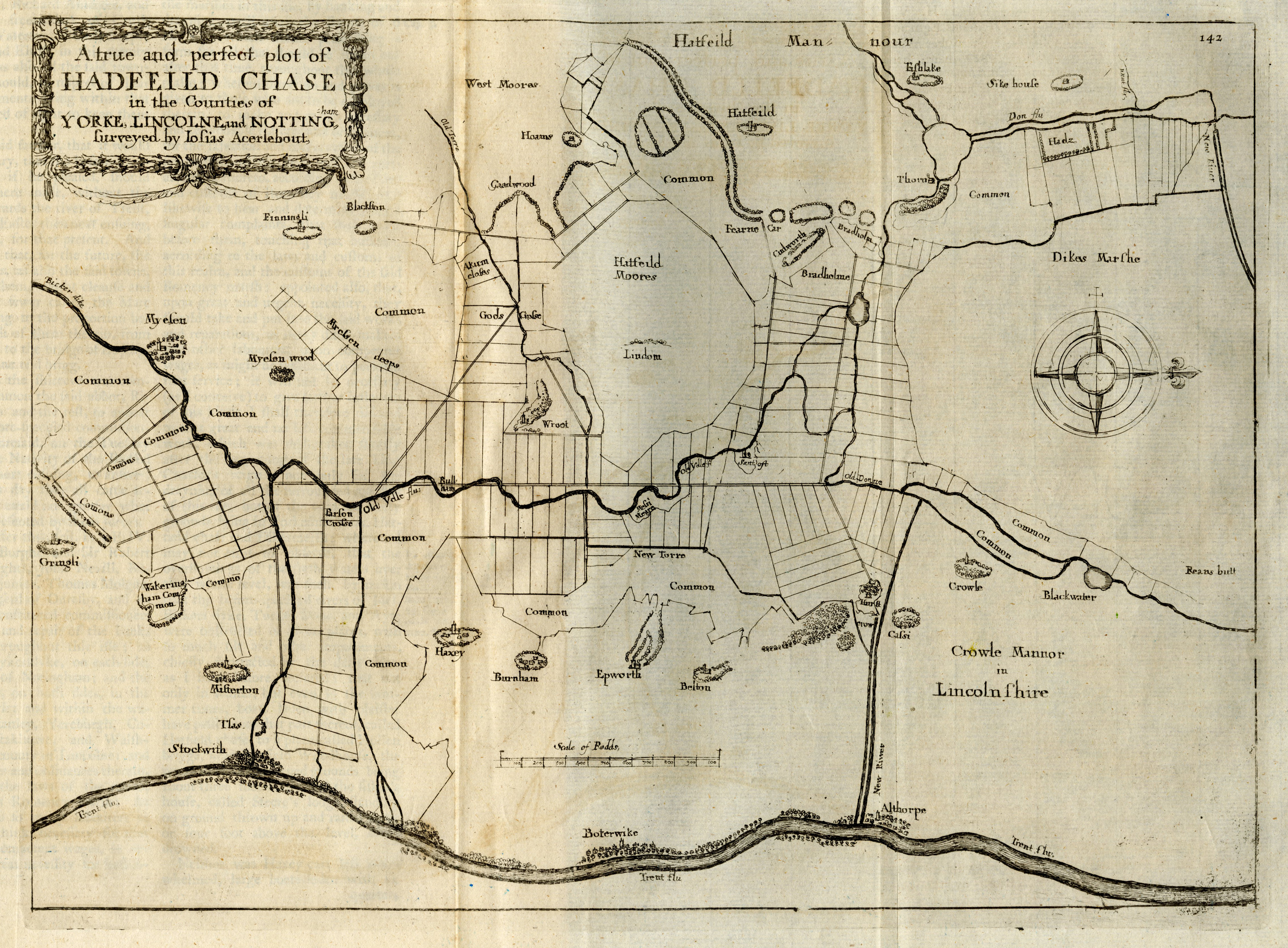
"A true and perfect Plot of Hatfield Chase, in the Counties of York, Lincoln, and Nottingham as surveyed by Josias Acerlebout." from "The history of imbanking and drayning" by William Dugdale (1662).

The moors had been used as a source for domestic fuel, in the form of peat, since at least the thirteenth and fourteenth centuries, and probably as early as the Roman or pre-Roman periods. In the early 1800s, peat was still being formed: William Harrison reported that a short time after moving to Thorne, a rise in the surface of the moors has obscured Crowle Church, previously visible from his home.

The area saw major changes in its hydrology in the 1630s, as a result of the drainage works of Cornelius Vermuyden. The River Don was routed northwards from Stainforth, passing to the west of the moors; the River Idle routed along the southern edge of Hatfield Chase, and a new channel was cut for the River Torne, which was isolated from the surrounding land by new flood banks. These works had less effect on Thorne Moors, which became isolated from Hatfield Moors with the completion of the Stainforth and Keadby Canal in 1802, running in an east–west direction between them. The moors were "warped" during the eighteenth and nineteenth centuries, a process by which silt-laden floodwater from the River Trent and the River Ouse was allowed to cover the land, resulting in silt building up on the surface. The Swinefleet Warping Drain can still be seen, running along the eastern edge of the moors, and connecting to the Ouse below Goole. It was last used for this purpose just before the First World War, in connection with land reclamation near Medge Hall, Crowle. This was the last known occasion on which warping was used in the moors to the south of the Humber.

The Thorne Moors Improvement Company was set up in 1848, authorised by the Thorne Moor Drainage and Improvement Act. They were charged with improving parts of the bog. Their activities increased in the 1880s, when they began to lease areas to companies who extracted the peat commercially for use as animal bedding. In order to do this, ditches had to be cut to begin the process of drainage. As the extent of the workings increased, a Dutch company cut canals in the peat. Horses pulled barges from canal paths alongside in order to remove the peat from the moors. Subsequently, a network of small railways were constructed along the canals to transport the peat.

Until the mid-twentieth century, all peat was cut by hand. Although the effects of the industry on the ecology of the moors were serious, hand cutting mainly affected the surface of the moors. It left behind trenches and ditches, which soon became waterlogged, and were re-colonised to become part of the diverse habitat. Once the cutting process was mechanised, peat could be cut from a greater depth, and at a faster rate, resulting in less ability for the moors to recover. Mechanical peat cutting was introduced to the moors in the early 1960s, and the process was similar to hand cutting, in that the peat was extracted over a small area but to a considerable depth. More destructive to the ultimate regeneration of the moors was the introduction of peat milling in 1985, where a thin layer of peat was stripped from a wider area. Thus in 1910, around 56 tonnes per acre were extracted from 1,240 acres (500 ha) of the moors, whereas in 1985 the yield was 10 tonnes per acre over double that area. As early as the late 1960s, academics and conservation agencies expressed concerns that the moors had been so badly damaged by peat extraction and farming that they were not worth saving.

=== Environmental campaigning ===
A scheme to cover the moors with ash from coal-fired power stations, and possibly municipal rubbish, was proposed in 1962, and again in 1969. Another plan of the 1960s was to build a regional airport on the moors; this proposal was revived in 1971. Further ash-tipping schemes were voiced in 1974, as was a third plan for an airport in 1976. There were also plans to use the moor as a dump for colliery waste in 1978, when Thorne Colliery was upgraded and reopened.

==== William Bunting ====
Although official attitudes did not place much value on the moors, William Bunting moved to Thorne after the Second World War and became an advocate for moor preservation. Thought to be rude and irascible, he began a campaign to recognise the ecological importance of the moors. He asserted that the enclosures of the 1800s, when common rights were replaced by private ownership, had been illegal, as was much of the commercial exploitation of his time. He seemed to have a good deal of evidence to support his claims, and took several major utilities to court over acts which he felt were illegal. He won a series of high-profile cases, which he used as publicity to advance the case for conserving the moors. In 1972, Bunting began direct action, aided by local residents, local naturalists, and students. During the week, the peat extraction company Fisons would cut drains to begin the process of lowering the water table. During the weekends, Bunting's Beavers, as his team became known, would walk onto the moors and construct dams across the new ditches, to retain the water levels. By the summer, the Beavers appeared to be winning the battle, and their activities were featured on BBC television. Fisons dynamited eighteen of the dams, but the activists were undeterred and began rebuilding them. Finally, Fisons conceded defeat, and negotiated with the Nature Conservancy Council on the future management of the moors in 1974. The government granted some 4,560 acres (1,845 ha) Site of Special Scientific Interest status in 1981. Although this had little immediate effect, it has contributed to subsequent appreciation of the area and its importance as an ecological resource.

=== Conservation ===
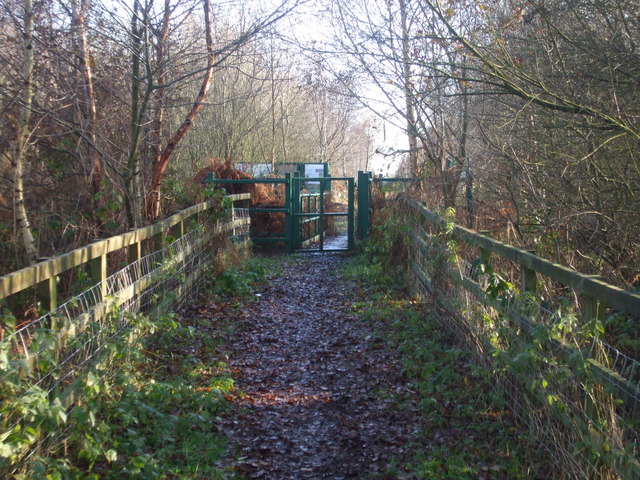
The entrance onto Thorne Moors National Nature Reserve from Moorends

The first small step towards conservation of the moors occurred in 1971, when an agreement was reached between the Lincolnshire Wildlife Trust and Fisons on the management of 144 acres (58 ha) on Crowle Moor. In 1985, the Nature Conservancy Council bought 180 acres (73 ha) of Thorne Waste, which had been part of the area worked by a canal network. The Lincolnshire Wildlife Trust purchased a total of 290 acres (118 ha) in 1987, which included the area they had been managing since 1971. The first large-scale transfer of land occurred in 1994, when Fisons gave 2,340 acres (946 ha) to English Nature, the successor to the Nature Conservancy Council. The agreement allowed Fisons to lease back the active peat fields from English Nature, and to continue to extract peat until 2025. However, they agreed to leave a minimum of 20 inches (50 cm) of peat, so that the moors could recover once extraction ceased. Areas that were not being worked were managed for conservation. At this time, English Nature also took control of parts of Hatfield Moors. The areas they managed were designated as the Humberhead Peatlands National Nature Reserve in 1995, and were extended by another 370 acres (150 ha) in the following year.

Most extraction of peat from the moors had ended by 2004, after the peat extraction rights, then owned by Scotts, had been bought by the government for £17 million. A small-scale operation was still active in 2005.

Environmentalists continued to campaign for recognition of the ecological value of the moors. In 2002 the government agreed to buy the peat extraction rights from The Scotts Company (now trading as The Scotts Miracle-Gro Company). The agreement was signed in April, before the cutting season began, and no cutting occurred on Thorne Moors after 2001. Stockpiles of cut peat continued to be removed from the moors until 2005. Scotts worked with English Nature to return worked areas to a condition where they could start to regenerate, until their involvement with this contract on Thorne Moors ended in March 2006. Since 2005, 4,020 acres (1,625 ha) of Thorne Moors have been designated as a national nature reserve. This includes the area bought by the Lincolnshire Wildlife Trust, which now manage most of Crowle Moor on behalf of Natural England, the successor to English Nature.

Limbert and Roworth have commented that, unlike other peat areas, such as the Somerset Levels, where recording of the industrial heritage has been systematic, the recording of the industrial archaeology of Thorne and Hatfield Moors has been notably scarce. A guide to the industrial history of South Yorkshire published in 1995 made no mention of peat at all. The canals dug by the Dutch and operated until the 1920s have been mentioned by canal historians such as Charles Hadfield, but have never been investigated systematically. The railways have received a little more attention in the specialist press, and some of the locomotives have been preserved. The history of the workers has been partially recorded through the Thorne and Hatfield Moors Oral History Project. In contrast, the ecology of the moors has been better documented, through the publication of the Thorne and Hatfield Moors Papers, first published by the Doncaster Naturalists Society in 1987. Since 1989, the Thorne and Hatfield Moors Conservation Forum have taken over this responsibility. These papers now run to nine volumes, and the forum has also published technical papers on many aspects of the moors.

In late 2016, construction work commenced at the Swinefleet Drain end of the nature reserve. The construction works include the installation and commissioning of a permanent Archimedes' screw type pumping station to ensure the water level in the peat bog is kept at an optimum level for peat regeneration. The work was commissioned by the Doncaster East Internal Drainage Board, and the principal contractor for the works was North Midland Construction PLC. The installation includes a tilting weir, which controls water levels for much of the time, but when the pump is required, it is powered by an off-grid generator, controlled by a telemetry system which uses wind and solar power.

In 2020, a major fire broke out at Hatfield Moors which burnt for more than ten days and covered an area of more than 3,500 acres (1,400 ha).

== Flora and fauna ==
In The Gentleman's Magazine 31 August 1727, George Stovin made reference to Hatfield Moor: "Here is great plenty of furze bushes, and variety of game, such as hares, foxes, kites, eagles, curlews, ducks and geese; there is no house or cottage near it, and but a few old oaks, fallows, and birch; the house is a little stud-bound one, and seems ready to fall".

Both Hatfield Moor and Thorne Moor have been designated at SSSIs. Hatfield Moor was initially designated in 1954 using the powers of the National Parks and Access to the Countryside Act 1949, and was re-desgnated in 1982 following the passing of the Wildlife and Countryside Act 1981. The designation was revised in 1988, and now covers an area of 3,461.1 acres (1,400.7 ha), which includes drainage ditches within the surrounding agricultural land as well as the peatland. It is the second largest raised peat bog in lowland England. Its size is only exceeded by Thorne, Crowle and Goole Moor, which was designated in 1970 and re-designated in 1986. This now covers an area of 4,740.9 acres (1,918.6 ha).

The Hatfield SSSI is notable for the dwarf shrubs heather and cross-leaved heath which grow in the drier areas, while in wetter places common cottongrass, hare's-tail cottongrass, bog cranberry, bog-rosemary, bog-myrtle and several species of Sphagnum moss grow. The invertebrate fauna includes the rare mire pill beetle, and other uncommon species of beetle, the bog rush cricket and the large heath butterfly. Birds that breed here include various heathland passerines as well as the nightingale, nightjars and three species of owl. The running water in the drainage ditches provides habitat for twelve species of pondweed, greater bladderwort, arrowhead and the nationally uncommon short-leaved water starwort. The first recording of the mire pill beetle in Britain was in 1977 on THorne Moor, and it is known to exist on Crowle Moor and Hatfield Moor, but probably nowhere else. It had also been recorded on Haxey Grange Fen, but a thorough survey conducted there in 2009 failed to find any.

== Peat industry ==
By the mid-eighteenth century, there was a small but established peat industry on the moors. George Stovin recorded that labourers dug peat turves in the summer, which were dressed by their wives and children, before being exported by boat through Thorne sluice and the River Don. The product was transported to Gainsborough, Leeds, Lincoln and York. The boats used were double-ended, about 27 feet (8.2 m) long, and travelled by canals dug into the peat, the chief of which was called Boating Dyke. Up to forty boats were operating in the 1790s, but competition from coal, which was a more efficient fuel, resulted in a decline, and only eight or nine boats were still operating in the 1820s. Internal canals on the moors had ceased to be used by the 1830s, with turves being transported by cart to Thorne or to the Stainforth and Keadby Canal.

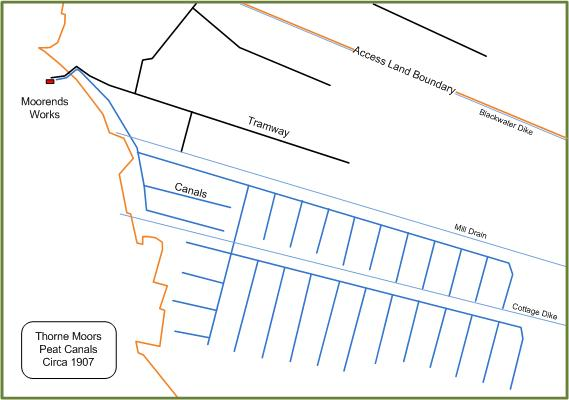
The Peat Canals circa 1907, which supplied peat to Moorends Works. The access land boundary is recent. Blackwater Dike, Mill Drain and Cottage Dike still exist and are named on the 2006 1:25,000 Ordnance Survey map.

There followed a period when improvement of the moors for agriculture was considered the way to proceed. An entrepreneur named John Gossip bought 3,000 acres (1,200 ha) of moor near Lindholme, and set about warping it with silt from an old river bed near Lindholme Lake. The cost proved excessive, and he installed a stationary steam engine and narrow gauge railway tracks, on which small wagons were pushed by hand, to aid the work. He ran into financial difficulties, however, and the land was repossessed by his backers. The main emphasis of the Thorne Moor Improvement Company, set up in 1848, was the "draining, warping and otherwise improving" of Thorne Waste, but the railway across the moors proposed by the Great Northern Railway Company, which was to provide transport for the products of the improved land, did not materialise, and little was achieved.

Two drains were built, of which the most successful was the Swinefleet Warping Drain, pioneered by Ralph Creyke and T.H.S. Sotheron, and authorised by an Act of Parliament. Opened in 1821, poor-quality land was reclaimed for around forty years. The other scheme was Durham's Warping Drain, to the north of Thorne, which ran westwards to a sluice on the River Don. The drain was completed in 1856 by Makin Durham, but he failed to achieve much reclamation of the peat moors. He died in 1882, just as ideas to use the peat commercially began to replace the concept of attempting to make the moors suitable for agriculture. The change was brought about by an agricultural depression and the high price of straw for animal bedding.

Peat was more absorbent than straw, and as there were huge numbers of working horses at the time, it was promoted as a replacement for straw. It could also be used for packing of fruit, as a replacement for sandbags, for fertiliser and as potting compost, as well as the manufacture of paraffin, creosote and tar. The owners of Thorne and Hatfield Moors leased their lands to peat companies, whose workers would dig drains, cut the turves, and stack them up to allow them to dry, so that they were ready for sale. The product was in competition with imports from the Netherlands, and the Dutch Griendtsveen Company set up the Griendtsveen Moss Litter Company in 1893, a holding company which would buy up companies operating in the Netherlands and in the United Kingdom. The works at Moorends kept its ledgers in Dutch and English, and a number of Dutch workers relocated to Thorne. By 1899, there were some 120 Dutch workers, forming a community of 300 with their wives and children, and there was concern among local people that they would lose their own jobs. Dutch tools and working practices were introduced, and the immigrants cut around 14 miles (23 km) of canals to transport peat to the mill at Moorends. The iron barges used on the canals were 40 feet (12 m) long, and were double ended, as they could not be turned round. A total of twelve were built in the Netherlands, and remained in use until 1922, when Moorends Mill burnt down. The barges were cut up, and the mill was not rebuilt, although some of the other buildings were used as workshops until 1956.

=== Amalgamation ===
In 1896, the British Moss Litter Company was formed, from an amalgamation of the Hatfield Chase Peat Moss Litter Company, the Griendtsveen Moss Litter Company, and most of the other companies working on the moors. They gained control of works at Creyke's Siding and Moorends to the west, Medge Hall to the south, Swinefleet to the east, and Old Goole in the north, together with the mill on Hatfield Moors. Old Goole mill closed in 1902, although peat was stored there for another twelve years. The new company did not have complete control of the moors, as there were several small independent peat works on Crowle Moor. The company was restructured in 1899, by winding up the original company and creating a new one with the same name but additional working capital. At the same time, Swinefleet Works was formally purchased, whereas it had been leased by the old company. Sales of peat rose steadily from 39,444 tons in 1893 to 74,948 tons in 1898.

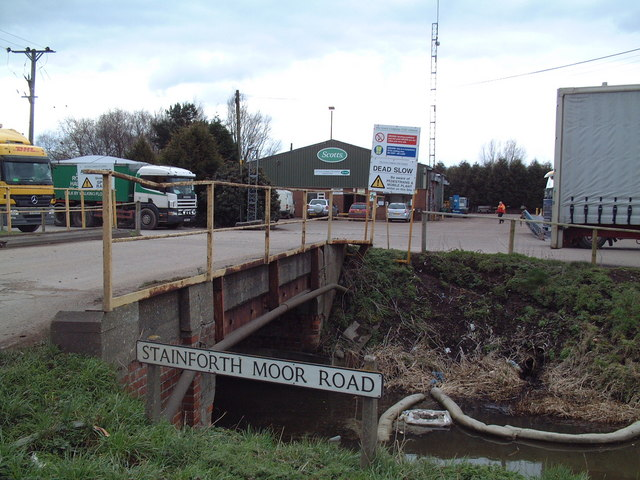
Although peat is no longer extracted from the moors, Scott's still use Hatfield Works to package imported peat. The entrance crosses Hatfield Waste Drain.

Following the end of the First World War, sales of peat began to decline, as working horses were replaced by motor lorries and tractors. The British Moss Litter Company bought up two other companies who were extracting peat in Crowle Moor in 1935. Most peat was sold as bales, with 'fine' peat being used by gardeners and the growing of mushrooms and 'litter' being used for animal bedding, while 'tailings' were used for floor covering at show-jumping events and for bulking up feed for cows. Around one-fifth was not baled, and was used for various purposes, including the production of firelighters, for health cures at Harrogate baths, and the purifying of gas by gas companies, for which it was mixed with iron ore at Creyke's Siding. By the late 1940s, it was finding a new market as litter for battery hen houses, and by then around 90 per cent was baled.

The works at Creyke's Siding was closed in the early 1960s, after fire destroyed much of it, Swinefleet Works was damaged by fire in 1962, and a fire on the moors at Hatfield destroyed huge stocks of dried peat. Despite this, the agricultural supplies company Fisons bought the operation in February 1963, and began upgrading the works at Swinefleet and Hatfield. Medge Hall works was in need of new machinery, and did not have good access for lorries, and so was closed in 1966. By the time a management buyout occurred in July 1994, Fisons was making £3.8 million profit annually on a turnover of £47 million. The new owners traded as Levington Horticulture, but on 1 January 1998, were taken over by the American garden products company Scotts.

=== Transport ===
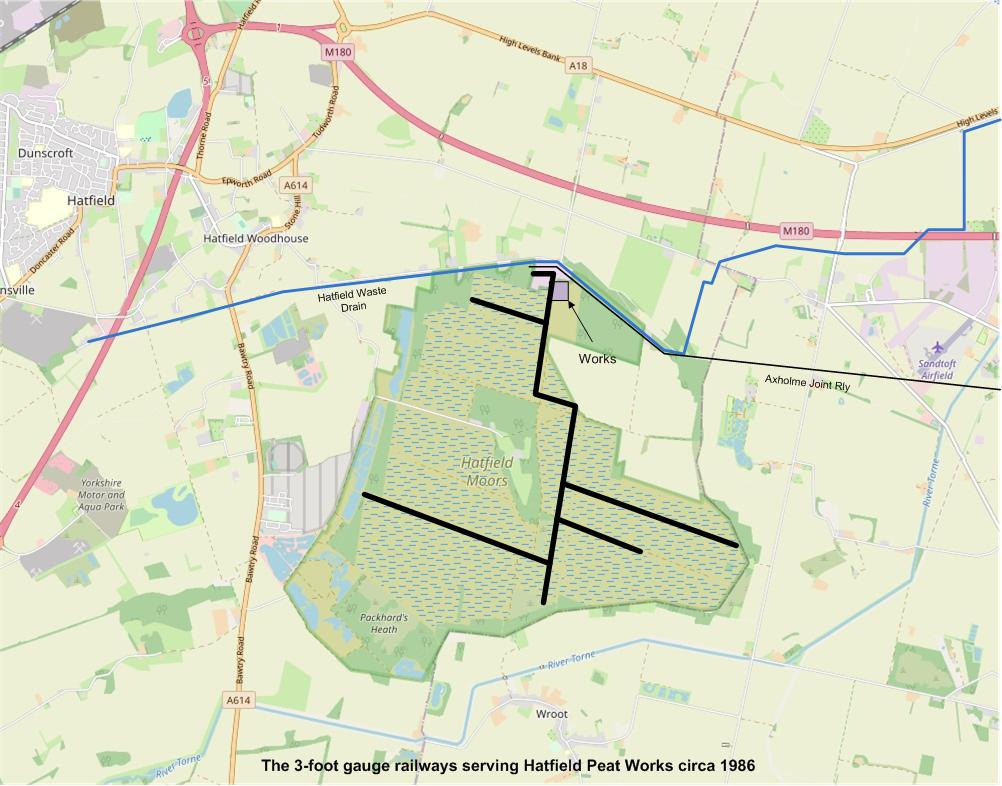
Map showing peat railways on Hatfield Moors circa 1986

Creyke's Siding and Moorends Works were both located close to the main railway line from Doncaster to Goole (Hull and Doncaster Branch), and were served by sidings. Medge Hall Works was similarly close to the line from Doncaster to Grimsby, and was also served by a siding. Swinefleet Works had their own 3 ft 7 in (1,093 mm) gauge tramway, which ran northwards to a wharf on the River Ouse near Swinefleet Clough. The line was around 2 miles (3.2 km) long, and had a single steam engine, built by Webster, Jackson & Co. of Goole. The Goole and Marshland Light Railway and the Isle of Axholme Light Railway were authorised by light railway orders in 1898 and 1899, and became the Axholme Joint Railway after a takeover by two larger companies in 1901. Following discussions, to try to alleviate a level crossing of the tramway and the new railway, a siding was constructed to Swinefleet Works, and the tramway was lifted in 1903. The railway company also built a 5-mile (8.0 km) branch from Epworth in 1909, in the hope of gaining the peat traffic from Hatfield Works, but they continued to cart their output north to Maud's Bridge, on the Doncaster to Scunthorpe line. The railway built a loading dock in 1911, and still did not gain the traffic, but finally in 1913, agreed to build a siding into the works in exchange for all the peat traffic. Thus all of the British Moss Litter Company's works could export their produce by rail.

A system of horse-drawn tramways was used to move the peat across the moor from at least the 1890s, since the lines are marked on the 1890 Ordnance Survey maps, and Booth includes a picture of Moorends Works taken in the 1890s, showing both 4 ft 8 1/2 in (1,435 mm) wagons and the 3 ft (914 mm) gauge wooden peat wagons used internally. Rotherham includes an engraving of a peat wagon in his book, consisting of a farm cart, still with its road wheels attached, but with a four-wheeled bogie under each of the axles to allow it to be pulled along the rails by two horses. However, no indication of a date is given. The rails were quite light, at 9 or 12 pounds per yard (4.5 or 6.0 kg/m), but were gradually increased to 18 pounds per yard (8.9 kg/m), and by the 1980s, when locomotives were in use, rails of 30 pounds per yard (15 kg/m) were installed. The flat-bottomed rails were initially made of iron, but were later replaced by steel rails. The tracks were referred to locally as trams, rather than tramways.

=== Locomotives ===
The first use of powered vehicles on the tramways occurred in 1947, when one of the fitters at Moorends Works built a machine from a wooden wagon frame and parts from an Austin Swallow car. Although trials were carried out in which peat wagons were towed, it was mainly used to transport personnel around the moors. It had an 8-horsepower (6.0 kW) engine, was later based at Swinefleet Works, and was derelict by 1960. The first purpose-built locomotive was also based at Swinefleet, and was bought in 1955. It was probably built by James & Frederick Howard of Bedford, and was a four-wheeled machine, fitted with a petrol engine, which was replaced by a Dorman diesel engine within a year as petrol was rationed at the time, due to the Suez Canal crisis. It was sufficiently successful that two horses were retired, and the company soon realised that the cost of owning locomotives was much less than the cost of owning horses, since they did not need to be fed and watered when not actually working.

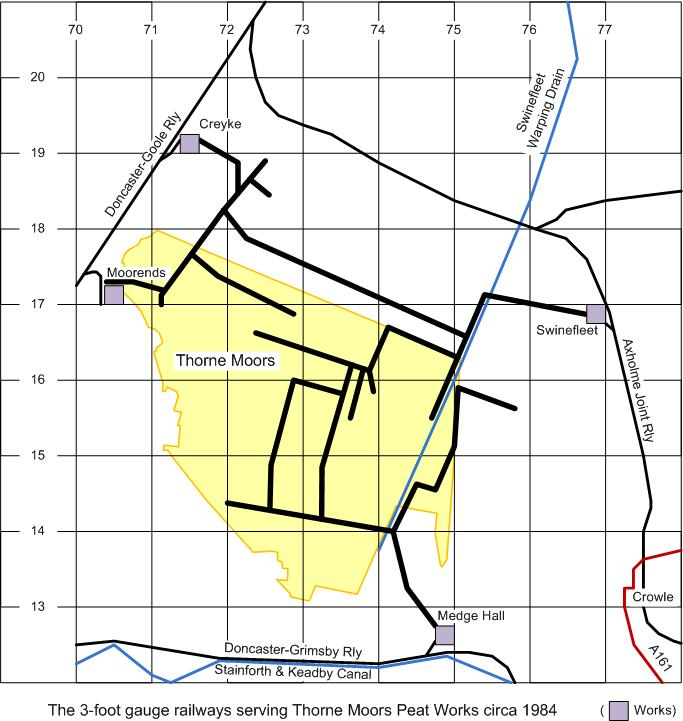
Map showing peat railways on Thorne Moors circa 1984, with older links to Creyke Siding and Moorends Works. The Axholme Joint Railway had also been lifted by this time.

The company ordered two new locomotives from the Lincoln-based firm of Ruston and Hornsby in 1959. They were described as class LBT locomotives by the manufacturer, and were fitted with 31.5 hp (23.5 kW) two-cylinder engines. One went to Swinefleet, after which the Howard machine was scrapped, and the other went to Medge Hall. A third locomotive of the same type was then ordered for Hatfield Works, allowing the horses there to be retired. The Medge Hall engine was transferred to Swinefleet when the works closed in 1966.

The next acquisition of locomotives took place after the British Moss Peat Company was acquired by Fisons in 1963. They ordered three 8.5 hp (6.3 kW) machines from R A Lister and Company, who were based in Dursley, Gloucestershire. They consisted of little more than an engine and driver's seat mounted on a chassis, and were used on the moors where the peat was loaded into wagons, only returning to the works for maintenance. Two were delivered to Swinefleet in 1964, and one went to Hatfield. A second machine for the Hatfield operation was ordered in 1967. Wooden peat trucks were gradually phased out following the purchase of 100 steel wagons in 1963 and 1964. They were manufactured in Leeds by Robert Hudson (Raletrux) Ltd, and were subsequently fitted with a fine inner mesh, to enable them to carry fragmented peat rather than turves. The new wagons had a side-opening door, and a tippler was installed to allow them to be emptied automatically.

=== Mechanisation ===
On the moors, when dried turves were ready to be collected, temporary track sections were laid at right angles to the main line, and a portable turntable was installed. A rake of twelve wagons could then be moved onto the temporary track, one at a time, to be filled by a 'filling gang'. Each wagon held about a ton, and once all twelve had been manoeuvred over the turntable back onto the main line, they would be pulled to the works by horses. With the advent of the small Lister engines, a new system was used, where three curved sections of track were used, the end one being clipped onto the top of the main line track. The engines could then push a line of forty or fifty wagons onto the temporary track. Cutting of the peat was mechanised from 1963, with the introduction of German peat-cutting machines, and by 1970, all hand cutting had ceased. Loading of the turves into wagons was also initially by hand, but gradually 'sod collectors' were introduced, which at Swinefleet had a 25-yard (23 m) conveyor and at Hatfield a 44-yard (40 m) one. These enabled a single side track to serve a much wider section of moor, without having to move the track. Loading turves onto the start of the conveyor was still done manually, but it became difficult to find people who wanted to do the work, and so Hymac loaders were used to load peat directly into the wagons. The success of this process at Hatfield in 1981 lead to it being used at Swinefleet as well.

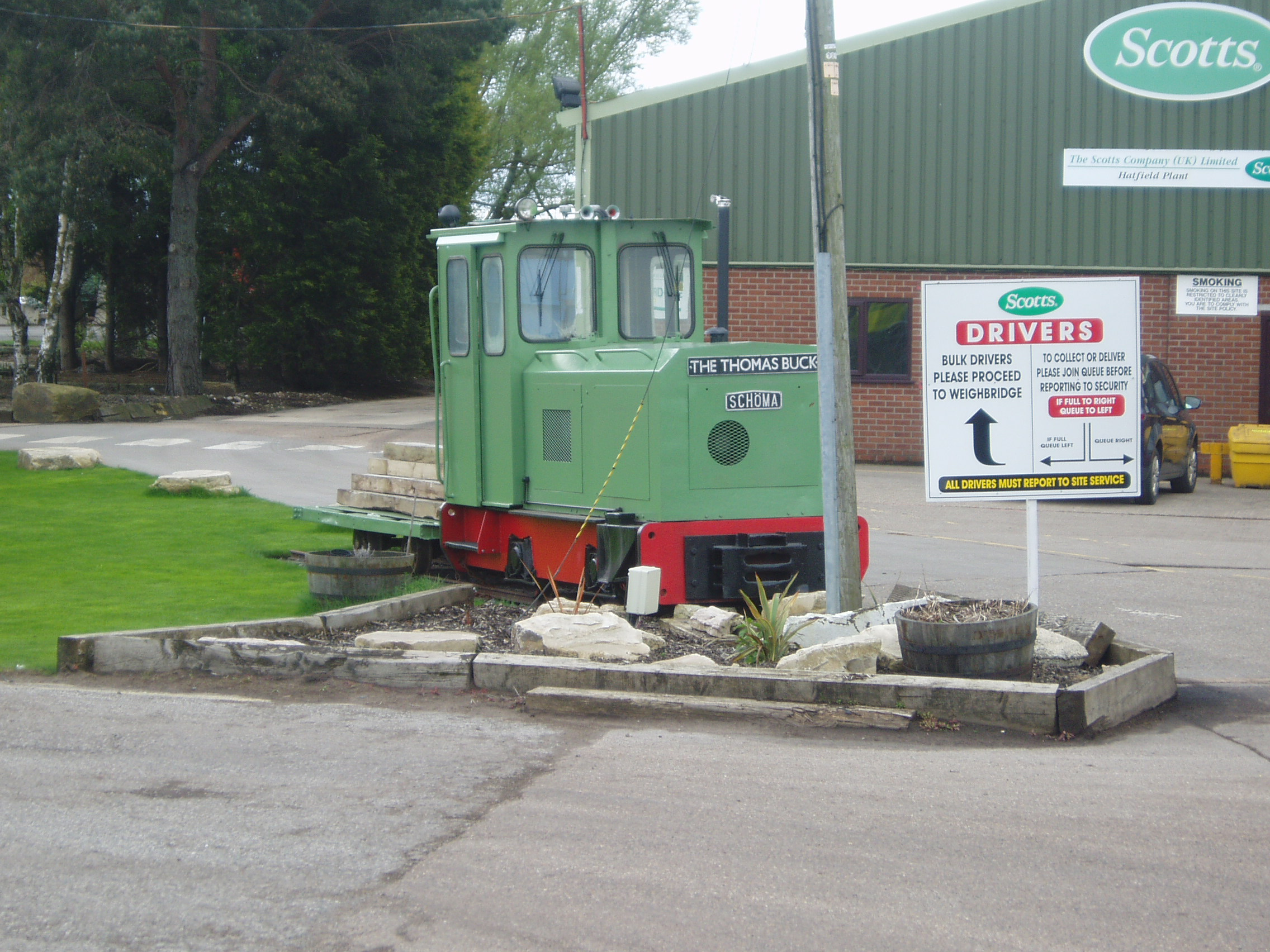
Schoma 5130, now carrying "The Thomas Buck" nameplate, on static display at Hatfield Peat Works in 2012

The next development was the introduction of surface milling, which began at Hatfield in 1986 and at Swinefleet in the following year. Once an area had been drained, all vegetation was removed from the surface, and a thin layer of peat was removed by a mechanical harvester. It was stockpiled on the moors, and later loaded into wagons by a Hymec loader, to be bagged at the works. Most peat by this time was used for compost or in growbags. The milled peat was much finer than the previous peat sods, and the mesh-sided wagons were unsuitable for transporting it. A programme of fitting wooden boards to the insides of the wagons was begun, but by 1989, solid steel wagons were being fabricated, reusing the frames from the original wagons. All the wagons at Hatfield had been upgraded by May 1990, with those at Swinefleet completed afterwards. Trains of the new wagons were much heavier, particularly when loaded with milled peat, and the existing locomotives were inadequate. Tenders were invited for some more powerful locomotives, and three machines were ordered from Schöma of Germany. Two were delivered to Hatfield in 1990, and the third went to Swinefleet in 1991. Each consisted of a CHL-60G master unit, rated at 65 kilowatts (87 hp) with a bonnet and cab, and a CHL-60T slave unit, looking more like a flat-bed truck, with a second hydraulic motor. They were much more powerful than the engines they replaced, with the four-axle arrangement ensuring that the axle loading was low enough for the existing track, and they were very popular with their operators. By the late 1990s, they were wearing out, and enquiries were made, with a view to purchasing replacements. Alan Keef designed a Bo-Bo locomotive for use on the moors, but the cost was too great, and the company rebuilt two of the Schoma locomotive and slave units. The work included replacing the original 5-cylinder engines with 6-cylinder models, improving the sanding gear and driver's seating arrangements, and fitting a more reliable air-conditioning system for the cab. Lack of funds prevented the third Schoma being upgraded. The 5-cylinder Deutz F5L 912 engines produced 65 kW, whereas the F6L 912 replacements produced 78 kW. They worked on Thorne Moors removing stockpiled peat until 21 October 2005, and on Hatfield Moors until 2006. They were stored at Hatfield once rail operation had ceased, and were still there in 2008.

In 1935, there were 20 miles (32 km) of tracks on Thorne Moors, with 150 peat wagons and 18 flat wagons. There was an additional 1.5 miles (2.4 km) of temporary track. 50 peat wagons and six flat wagons ran on 6 miles (9.7 km) of permanent track on Hatfield Moors, where there were 0.5 miles (0.8 km) of temporary track. By 1989, there were about 8 miles (13 km) of permanent track on Hatfield Moors, and double that on Thorne Moors. Following the arrival of the Dutch workers in the 1890s, the community continued to expand with the arrival of workers from the Netherlands until about 1912, but most had returned to their country of origin by 1914. In the 1930s, the British Moss Litter Company employed around 160 people, and haulage was achieved by twelve horses. During the Second World War, the Ministry of Supply ran the works, and the workforce dropped to 138, although there were still twelve horses. After the war, several of the men were assisted by their wives, who helped with the stacking of the peat, but did not get paid for their labour. Numbers had dropped to 118 by the 1960s, although a number of unpaid wives were still working on the moors. With the increasing sales of peat for gardeners, the workforce increased to 185 by the mid-1970s, swelled by up to 90 contract workers during busy periods. The total annual output of dried peat at this time was around 45,000 tonnes, produced from 400,000 tonnes of wet peat, all of it going to the horticultural industry. Swinefleet Works stopped production in July 2000, and was fully decommissioned by September. Subsequently, peat from Thorne Moors was transferred to Hatfield for processing.

=== Locomotive details ===
Location	Builder	Type	Built	Scrapped	Works number	Notes (Most details from Booth 1998. Some from Limbert & Roworth 2009)
Moorends	Moorends Works	4w	1947	1960		Built from wooden wagon chassis and Austin Swallow car by works fitter.
Swinefleet	James & Frederick Howard	4w	1930	1959		Bought second-hand in 1955. 31 hp petrol engine replaced with Dorman diesel engine by 1956.
Swinefleet	Ruston and Hornsby	4w LBT	1959	Preserved	432661	31.5 hp 2-cylinder 2-YDAL engine. Named "Simba". Rebuilt 1985 with Deutz engine, hydraulic transmission and taller cab. Moved to Hatfield. Unused by 1994. Regauged to 2 ft 6 in (762 mm) after preservation.
Medge Hall	Ruston and Hornsby	4w LBT	1959	Preserved	432665	31.5 hp 2-cylinder 2-YDAL engine. Transferred to Swinefleet in 1966. Rebuilt with Lister engine by 1980. Named "Tania". Regauged to 2 ft 6 in (762 mm) after preservation.
Hatfield	Ruston and Hornsby	4w LBT	1962	Preserved	466594	31.5 hp 2-cylinder 2-YDAL engine. Moved to Swinefleet 1969. Rebuilt with Lister engine by 1980. Named "Sheeba". Regauged to 2 ft 6 in (762 mm) after preservation.
Swinefleet	Lister	4w RM2X	1964	Preserved	53976	8.5 hp. Regauged to 2 ft 6 in (762 mm) after preservation.
Swinefleet	Lister	4w RM2X	1964	Preserved	53977	8.5 hp. Attacked by vandals with a mechanical digger in 1991. Regauged to 2 ft 6 in (762 mm) after preservation.
Hatfield	Lister	4w RM24	1964	1987	54184	8.5 hp. Moved to Swinefleet after 1975
Hatfield	Lister	4w RM1	1967		55471	4.25 hp. Moved to Swinefleet 1969. Dismantled early 1980s.
Hatfield	Simplex	4w 40s	1967	Preserved	40s302	At Crowle Peatland Railway, undergoing restoration.
Hatfield	Simplex	4w 40s	1971	1988	40s378	Dorman 2LD 40 hp engine.
Hatfield	Hunslet	4w	1974	Preserved	7366	Perkins engine. Moved to Swinefleet by 1988. Regauged to 2 ft 6 in (762 mm) after preservation.
Hatfield	Hunslet	4w	1974	Preserved	7367	Perkins engine. Regauged to 2 ft 6 in (762 mm) after preservation.
Hatfield	Fritz Schöttler (W Germany)	4w Diema DFL 10/11	1974	Preserved	3543	8.5 hp engine later replaced by a 10 hp Deutz engine. Disused from 1979 to 1983. Frames used in rebuild of another Diema in 1986. Preserved, and two Diemas rebuilt separately.
Swinefleet	Diema	4w	1976	Preserved		Built at Swinefleet from parts supplied by Diema. Rebuilt 1986 with parts from Diema 3543. Disused by 1996. Preserved and rebuilt without parts from 3543.
Hatfield	Simplex	4w	1949	1989/90	10159	Bought second-hand. At Swinefleet by 1982.
Hatfield	Simplex	4w	1950	Sold	10160	Bought second-hand in 1977 from London Brick Co, Arlesey. Sold to May-Gurney 1984. Worked on Southend Pier contract in 1985.
Hatfield	Simplex	4w	1955	1987	10455	Bought second-hand in 1977 from London Brick Co, Arlesey.
Swinefleet	Simplex	4w	1978		40SD507	
Hatfield	Simplex	4w	1983		40SD527	Out of use by 1994, abandoned in 1997.
Hatfield	Schöma	4w+4w CHL-60G	1990	Preserved	5129 + 5131	78 kW master unit with powered slave unit. At Crowle Peatland Railway in running order.
Hatfield	Schöma	4w+4w CHL-60G	1990	Preserved	5130 + 5132	78 kW master unit with powered slave unit. Locomotive plinthed at Hatfield Works, carrying "The Thomas Buck" nameplate, until 2019. At Crowle Peatland Railway awaiting restoration.
Swinefleet	Schöma	4w+4w CHL-60G	1991	Preserved	5220 + 5221	65 kW master unit with powered slave unit. Named "The Thomas Buck" in 1993. At Crowle Peatland Railway in running order.

Several redundant locomotives were bought for preservation by Cliff Lawson of Tring. The group included three machines made by Ruston and Hornsby, two made by Hunslet, and two made by Lister. The eighth engine bought was the Diema, which was a hybrid made from the frames of two machines. Restoration involved splitting the components apart, and using them to rebuild both of the original locomotives, resulting in nine locomotives being preserved. Lawson re-gauged all of them to 2 ft 6 in (762 mm), and they have all been restored to working order. Lister 53977 was loaned to the Doncaster Museum and Art Gallery in 2007.

The Crowle Peatland Railway is laying a stretch of track near Crowle, so that they can run some of the original locomotives on it. The Society obtained one of the original Simplex locomotives and two of the Schomas, including all three slave units.

== Gas industry ==
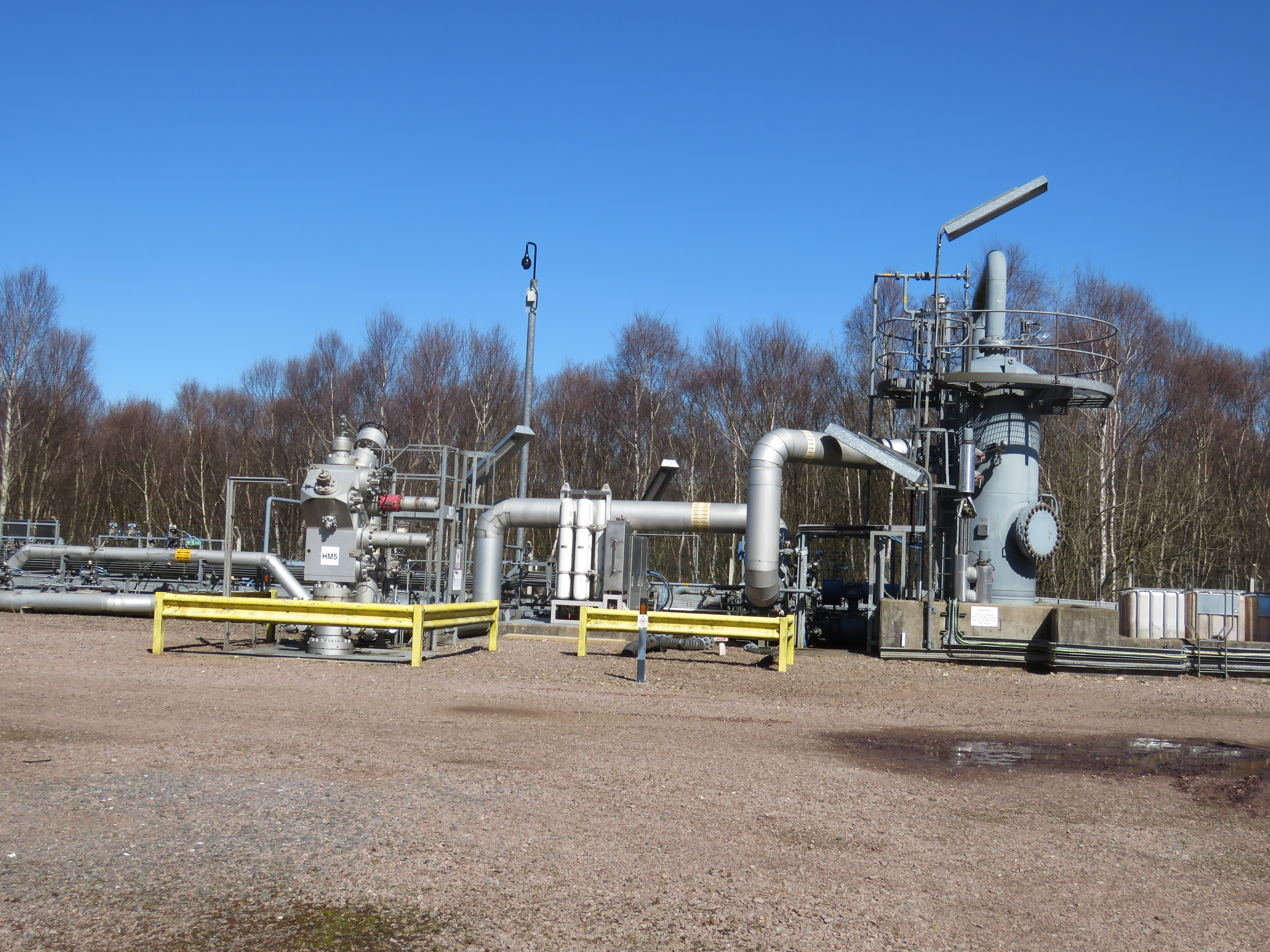
Part of the gas wellhead facility, showing the knock-out pot (right) and one of three well heads (left)

Deep below the surface of Hatfield Moor is an anticline or fold in the geological strata, with two culminations or high points, known as Hatfield Moor and Hatfield West. This rock structure was first discovered in the 1960s, when BP and the Gas Council were searching for possible deposits of oil. Drilling for oil-bearing formations took place in 1981, and the Hatfield Moor natural gas field was discovered when the drill broke through into it. A major blow-out occurred, which ignited and destroyed the drilling rig. After 17 days of burning, the Texan oil fire specialist "Boots" Hansen arrived to bring it under control, and the fire was finally extinguished after 38 days, during which around 1 billion cubic feet (28.3 million m^{3}) of gas were consumed.

Additional wells were drilled in the 1980s, and a single well was constructed to access the Hatfield West gas field, discovered in 1983 and located a little to the west of the moors. The Hatfield Moor field is located at a depth of 1450 feet (440 metres) below the moor, and the two formations contained about 8.5 billion cubic feet (241 million m^{3}) of gas. The sites were initially owned and operated by Edinburgh Oil and Gas plc, and commercial extraction of the gas started in 1986. A small gas treatment plant and a pipeline were constructed, to supply the gas to Belton Brickworks, to the east of the moors.

In 1994, the gas processing plant was replaced by a new installation, and the gas was fed into the local distribution network, owned by British Gas. Belton Brickworks then received its gas supply from the Hatfield West field, and this continued for another six years, until the gas field and the associated pipeline were shut down in 2000. Meanwhile, Edinburgh Oil and Gas applied for permission to use the depleted Hatfield Moor reservoir to store gas. They also needed to construct a processing plant and pipelines to connect it to the National Transmission System, and permission was granted in January 1999. Construction work started in September, and the facilities became operational in February 2000. It was the first onshore storage facility of its kind in Britain, and a 25-year storage contract was agreed between Edinburgh Oil and Gas and ScottishPower, but in December 2006 the owners sold the well head site and the operating licences to ScottishPower, who now operate the Lindholme gas compressor station and also hold the rights to the Hatfield West field.

Gas is stored in a layer of porous Oaks Rock Sandstone, around which a band of solid rock prevents the gas from escaping. There is a gas offtake for the National Transmission System (NTS) at Beltoft, North Lincolnshire, just to the south of the M180 motorway and to the east of Hatfield Moor. From Beltoft, 9.3 miles (15.0 km) of pipeline carry gas westwards to the Lindholme Compression Site, on the western edge of Hatfield Moor, and back a further 0.95 miles (1.5 km) to the well injection site, located on the Moor within the SSSI. The main pipeline is 12 inches (300 mm) in diameter, while the pipeline to the well site is 16 inches (410 mm) in diameter. There are three well heads at the site, all of which can be used to inject gas into the storage reservoir, but only two are used to extract gas from below ground. The gas is injected into the site to a maximum pressure of 650 pounds per square inch (44.82 bar).

During periods of low demand gas is taken from the gas offtake at Beltoft, and transferred via the main pipeline to the Lindholme Compression Site. The gas is heated in a water bath heater, passes through a pressure let-down skid and continues to the Hatfield Moor well site for injection into the reservoir for storage. The sandstone reservoir has a capacity of about 4.1 billion cubic feet (116 million cubic metres). During periods of high demand gas is withdrawn from the reservoir and through the pipeline to the Lindholme site. Here the gas is dehydrated with glycol and compressed using a gas-turbine driven compressor to a pressure suitable for export back to Beltoft and into the National Transmission System.

== See also ==
- Archaeology of Hatfield and Thorne
- Goole Fields
- Hatfield Chase for details of land drainage

== Bibliography ==
- Booth, Adrian (1998). The Peat Railways of Thorne and Hatfield Moors. Industrial Railway Society. ISBN 978-1-901556-04-9.
- Cory, Vernon (1985). Hatfield and Axholme - An Historical Review. Providence Press. ISBN 978-0-903803-15-1.
- Evans, D J (2007). An appraisal of Underground Gas Storage technologies and incidents (PDF). Open Report OR/07/023 (Report). British Geological Survey. Archived (PDF) from the original on 7 April 2018.
- Keef, Alan M (2008). A Tale of Many Railways. Lightmoor Press. ISBN 978-1-899889-30-3.
- Limbert, Martin, ed. (1998). "Thorne and Hatfield Moors Papers". Thorne & Hatfield Moors Papers a Journal for the Ecology, Palaeoecology, History and Conservation of the Humberhead Levels. 5. Thorne and Hatfield Moors Conservation Forum. ISSN 0963-0554.
- Limbert, Martin; Roworth, Peter C. (2009). "Mechanised Peat Winning and Transportation on Thorne Moors (2nd Ed)". THMCF Technical Report. Thorne & Hatfield Moors Conservation Forum. ISSN 1468-2087.
- Nicholson (2006). Nicholson Guides Vol 6: Nottingham, York and the North East. Harper Collins. ISBN 978-0-00-721114-2.
- Nield, Ted (5 September 1985). "Onshore oil is all set to grow". New Scientist. ISSN 0262-4079. Archived from the original on 7 April 2018.
- Rotherham, Ian D. (2010). Yorkshire's Forgotten Fenlands. Wharncliffe Books. ISBN 978-1-845631-31-4.
- RSK (September 2009). "Hatfield Moor and Hatfield West Gas Storage Facility" (PDF). iema.net. Archived (PDF) from the original on 6 April 2018.
- Stoneman, Rob (2006). "Peat bogs and climate change". Yorkshire Peat Partnership. Archived from the original on 4 March 2016.
- Van de Noort, Robert (2001). "Thorne Moors: a contested wetland in north-eastern England" (PDF). The Heritage Management of Wetlands in Europe. Brussels: EAC. Archived (PDF) from the original on 26 October 2018.
