= Crowle Peatland Railway =

Railway museum in Crowle, England

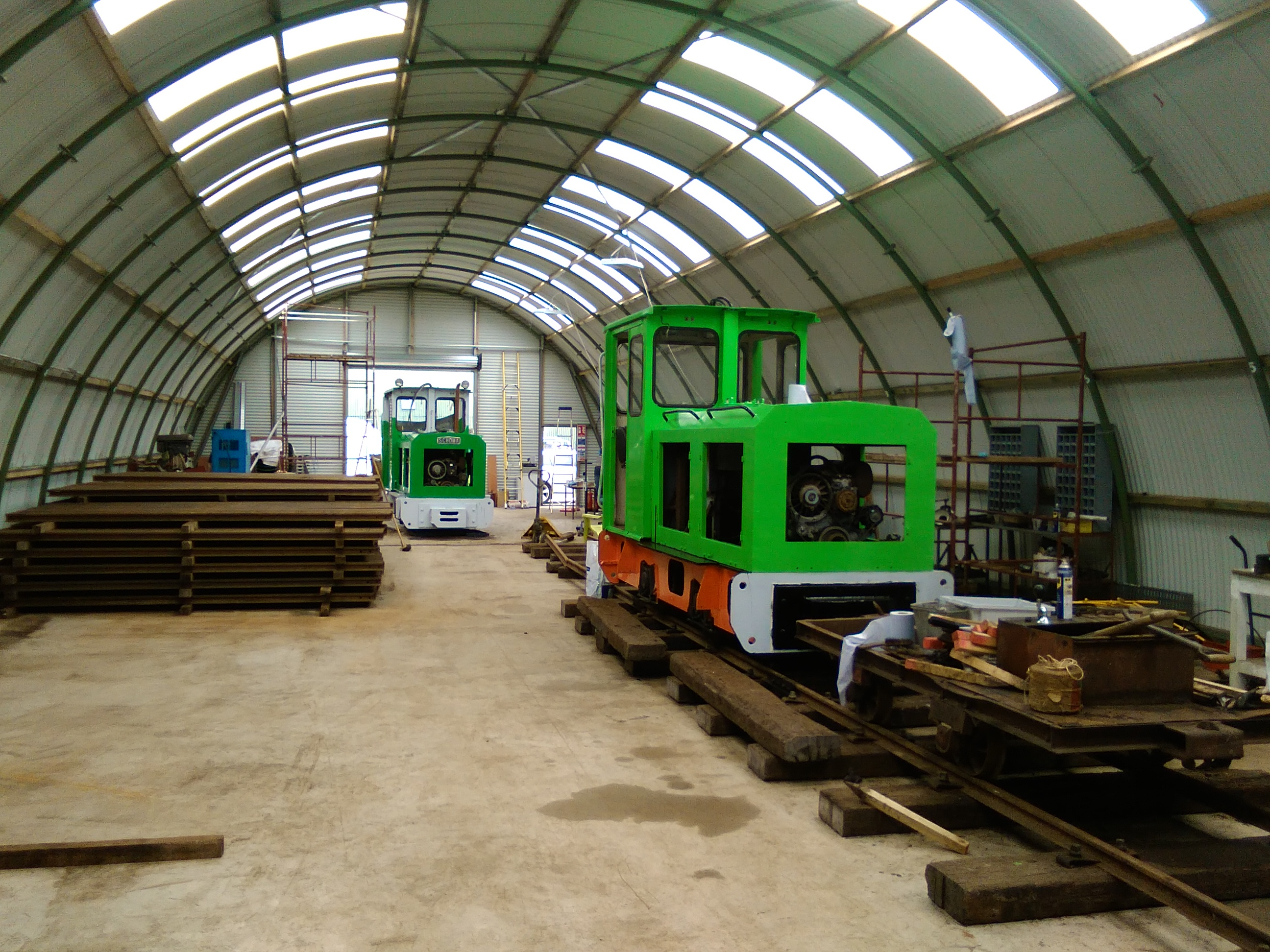
- Schöma locomotives 5220 of 1991 (front) and 5129 of 1990 (rear) in Crowle Peatland Railway's Romney Hut

- Location within Lincolnshire

General information
- Status: Railway Museum
- Location: Crowle, Lincolnshire, England
- Coordinates: 53°37′04.00″N 0°51′21.00″W
- Opened: 2016

Crowle Peatland Railway is a railway museum based on the peat moors at Crowle in North Lincolnshire, England.

== History ==
=== Background ===
Thorne and Hatfield Moors have a long history of being exploited for peat. Following Cornelius Vermuyden's attempts to drain Hatfield Chase in the 1620s, there was unrest, with local people clashing with the incoming people who settled the land that had been drained. A Commission was created to resolve issues over common land, and in 1630 gave 'turbary rights' to tenants, which allowed them to cut peat for their own purposes, but not to sell peat to third parties. There were attempts in the early 1800s to improve the moors for agricultural use, but by the time Makin Durham, one of the chief protagonists, died in 1882, there was a shift towards extracting peat for commercial purposes. In 1896 the Hatfield Chase Peat Moss Litter Company amalgamated with the Griendtsveen Moss Litter Company and other smaller companies who were working on Thorne Moors, to become the British Moss Litter Company. The new company controlled all of the major peat works on the moors, and began installing 3 ft (914 mm) gauge tramways, to transport the cut peat from the moors to the various works. In the 1950s, horses were gradually replaced by locomotives as the means of moving wagons around the system. As several works closed down, the tramways were linked up, with that at Swinefleet serving Thorne Moors, and that at Hatfield serving Hatfield Moors. Both works were linked by standard gauge sidings to the Axholme Joint Railway. The British Moss Litter Company was bought out by Fisons in February 1963, Fisons were the subject of a management buyout in July 1994, and began trading as Levington Horticulture, which was taken over by the American company Scotts on 1 January 1998.

Crowle Moor is effectively an eastward extension of Thorne Moor. The Commission of 1630 gave turbary rights to the inhabitants and tenants of Crowle, but the 400 acres (160 ha) of land to which they had rights was in Yorkshire. This anomaly was noted by the Local Government Act 1888, which moved the county boundary so that the Crowle turbary land was included in Lincolnshire. Peat exploitation to the east of the Swinefleet Warping Drain was always on a smaller scale than on Thorne Moors to the west of the drain, and in 1993 the boundary was realigned slightly, so that it followed the course of the drain. Over the years there were several small peat moss mills established in Crowle, all near to Moor Middle Road, and each working a ribbon of moorland which ran north-westwards from the mill to the parish boundary. The British Moss Litter Company also extracted peat from Crowle Moors, taking it to Medge Hall and Swinefleet Works, but this ceased in 1956 after a disastrous fire on the moors.

The longest-running site on Crowle Moor was that based at Moors Farm, where horses pulled wagons loaded with hand-cut turves along a single tramway track to a mill. The farm was bought by Clifford Cowling in 1940, who initially used the 26-acre (11 ha) site for agriculture, but in 1947 set up the Scientific Peat Company with William Thomas. Herbert Pickett from Crowle became an additional partner in 1950, and in 1951, the company was bought out by his son Sid Pickett, and Herbert Mason. Turves were conveyed to the mill on a trailer pulled by a Fordson Major tractor, although a short section of tramway was used on the moors between 1954 and 1957. A diesel engine replaced the paraffin engine which powered the mill in 1955, and the mill was connected to an electricity supply in 1957. The peat was processed for horticultural use, and the firm pioneered the use of polythene packaging on Thorne Moors. Consequently, the company was renamed in 1960, becoming Poly-Peat Products. The mill was subsequently used by Ken Crow Peat Products, Richgro Peat, and finally Fernmoor UK Limited, which was incorporated in 2002, and was the last peat company to be formed.

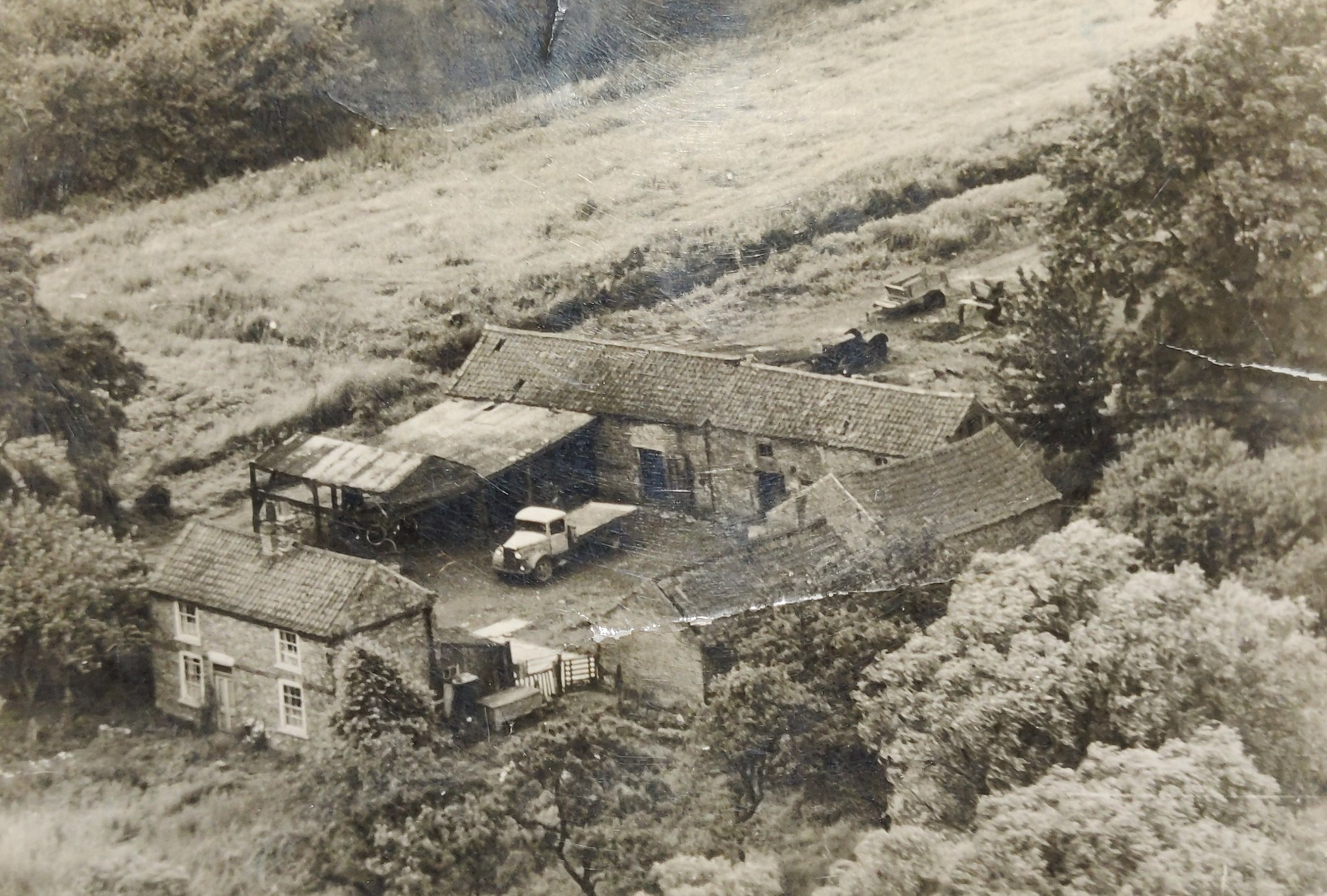
The Old Peatworks site on Crowle Moors in the 1950s when operated by the Picketts.

The transition of the moors from an industrial workplace to an ecological resource began in 1971, when Fisons reached an agreement with the predecessor of the Lincolnshire Wildlife Trust over the management of 144 acres (58 ha) of Crowle Moor as a nature reserve. The Trust bought 290 acres (120 ha) in 1987, which included the area they had been managing since 1971. Fisons gave 2,340 acres (9.5 km^{2}) of moorland to English Nature in 1994, in a climate where there was relentless pressure from environmentalists to recognise the ecological value of the moors. This culminated in the government buying the peat extraction rights for Thorne and Hatfield Moors from Scotts in 2002 for £17 million. On most of the moors, no further extraction of peat occurred, although cut peat continued to be removed by Scotts until 2005. By the end of 2005, some 4,020 acres (16.25 km^{2}) of Thorne and Crowle Moors had been designated as a National Nature Reserve, with the Lincolnshire Wildlife Trust managing most of Crowle Moors. The peat works at Crowle, then run by Fernmoor, was known to be operating without planning permission, and the North Lincolnshire Council (Crowle) Discontinuance Order 2002 sought to shut down the operation. Peat extraction continued, despite the issuing of an Enforcement Notice and a Stop Notice in March 2003, and it was not until 2007 that peat extraction finally ceased after a long-running public enquiry published its findings. Fernmoor was wound up on 25 September 2007.

=== Railway project ===
Following the demise of commercial activity on Crowle and Thorne Moors, they became part of the Humberhead National Nature Reserve. The tramway tracks were removed, but various equipment was left at Bank Top, including one of the Simplex locomotives and some bin harvesters. A society was formed, initially called the Crowle and Thorne Moors Peat Railway Society, with the aim of restoring the locomotive, and using the maintenance shed at Bank Top as a base for a short running track. It would also serve to promote the history and heritage of the peat railways. However, the scheme did not meet with the approval of Natural England, although they were supportive of the aims of the society, and donated the locomotive and bin harvesters to them. They were removed from the moors in 2015, and temporarily stored on a local farm.

In 2014, the Society discovered that two of the original Schöma locomotives that had worked on the moors were for sale by a dealer based in Norfolk. Two visits were made to inspect them, the second on 16 February 2015, after which a price was agreed, although the locomotives, together with three slave units, remained at the premises of the dealer Ray King until a suitable location could be found to store them. The Poly-Peat site was now owned by North Lincolnshire Council, and became the base for the operation, while the Society was renamed Crowle Peatland Railway. They received funding of £10,000 from North Lincolnshire Council and the Isle of Axholme and Hatfield Chase Landscape Partnership to fund the restoration of the locomotives. The Partnership obtained a grant of £1.84 million from the Heritage Lottery Fund, which benefitted a number of local projects, including the railway. The Schoma locomotives were moved from Norfolk to a Romney hut, also used as covered accommodation for a herd of goats, on 10 May 2016, and were subsequently joined by the Simplex. The Society then received a grant of £23,000 from the SSE Keadby Grange Windfarm, to finance the construction of a new Romney hut, to act as a workshop for the project Planning permission for the building was granted on 30 June 2017 and the Schoma locomotives were moved into the completed building on 5 September 2018. Meanwhile, the Simplex locomotive was moved to North Lindsey College, for engineering students to carry out the restoration work as part of their course.

As of May 2019, there was no electricity supply to the Romney hut. The supply company Northern Powergrid (Yorkshire) acting on behalf of North Lincolnshire Council applied for permission to rebuild 9 spans of an existing overhead 11kV power line supplying adjacent housing, on 7 May 2019. This provided a 3-phase supply at 150kva, to power workshop machinery. In June 2019, the railway received £107,000 from North Lincolnshire Council, to fund a visitor centre, education facilities, a shop, toilets and a cafe. Crowle Moors are part of a Site of Special Scientific Interest (SSSI), and the visitor centre will help people to appreciate the social and industrial heritage of the moors. The railway have constructed some 550 yards (500 m) of track running onto the moors, on which the locomotives can operate.

== Rolling stock ==
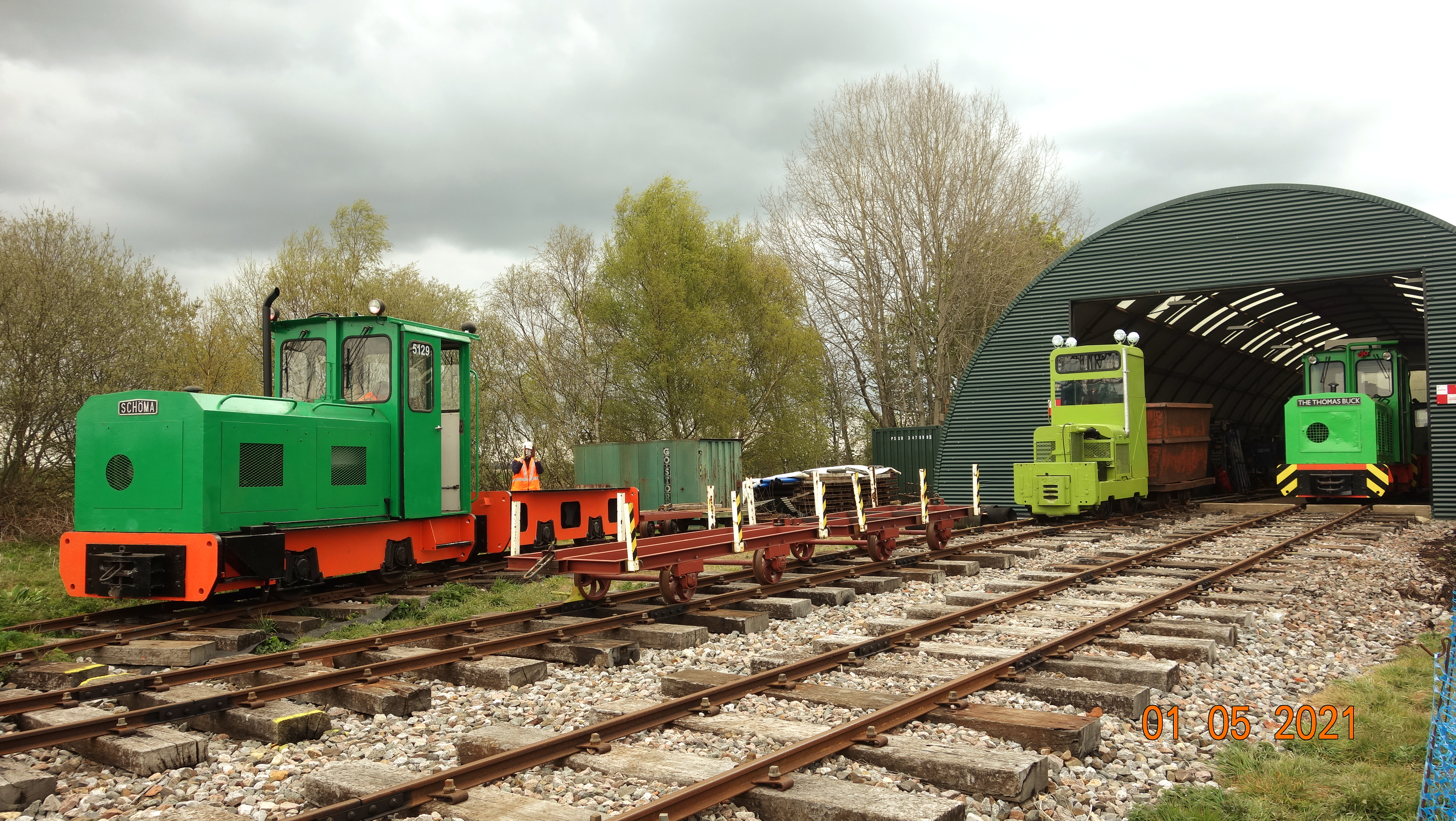
Schoma 5129 (left) and 5220 (right) with Simplex "Little Peat" in the centre.

Between 1947 and the demise of commercial working, 23 internal combustion locomotives worked on the moors. All were 4-wheel vehicles, and they came from a variety of manufacturers. Nine locomotives were bought for preservation between 1992 and the close of the system. They were regauged to 2 ft 6 in (762 mm), and eight of them are in private collections, while one Lister, works number 53977, built in 1964, was loaned to Doncaster Museum and Art Gallery in 2007. One locomotive was abandoned at Bank Top around 1996, and it was this that sparked the idea for the railway. It was a 40 hp (30 kW) Simplex, manufactured by Motor Rail in 1967, with the works number 40s302, and bought new by Fisons. When new, it had a fairly low cab, but a number of locomotives had their cabs extended upwards, to allow the drivers to stand up and see over the top of the wagons, and 40s302 was running with an extended cab and exhaust pipe by May 1992. During restoration at North Lindsey College, the main bearing journals were found to be completely worn out, which was probably the reason for it being abandoned on the moors. College members were unable to reassemble the locomotive at Crowle due to the Covid pandemic, and it was assembled by volunteers. This work was completed by 19 June 2021, when it ran under its own power again. The restoration was shortlisted for the 2023 Heritage Railway Association awards, in the diesel and electric locomotion category.

In 1990, Fisons bought two new Schoma locomotives from Christoph Schőttler Gmbh, of Diepholz in Germany. They were rather bigger than previous motive power, weighing around 5 tonnes and were fitted with engines developing 86 hp (64 kW). They were 4-wheel diesel hydraulic machines, and each was supplied with a slave unit, looking like a flat truck, which weighed a similar amount and had hydraulic motors which could be driven from the locomotive. Works numbers were 5129 and 5130, with the slave units numbered 5131 and 5132. The following year, Fisons bought a third locomotive, number 5220 with slave unit 5221. From February 1993, this locomotive was named The Thomas Buck, after a retired worker, with the nameplate fitted to the front of the bonnet. In the late 1990s, Alan Keef designed a 125 hp (93 kW) bo-bo locomotive to replace them, but the project did not proceed due to the costs, and instead, two of the locomotives were rebuilt with 6-cylinder 105 hp (78 kW) engines and better air conditioning units. Conversion of the third locomotive, number 5220, did not occur, again because of costs. After rail operations ceased on the moors, 5130 was mounted on a plinth at the front of Hatfield Works, with the nameplate from The Thomas Buck, and the other two locomotives were stored at Hatfield until at least 2008.

The two remaining Schomas and all three slave units eventually arrived at Ray King's site in Norfolk, to be purchased by Crowle Peatland Railway and moved to Crowle on 10 May 2016. The third Schoma locomotive was donated to the railway by Evergreen Horticulture, who manage Hatfield Peat Works, in June 2019.

In June 2020, the railway purchased a Lisbon tram, number 711, which had been imported to Britain and stored at Walton-on-the-Naze for some years for a project that did not materialise. They received a grant from the SSE Keadby Wind Farm Fund to allow them to buy the vehicle. They intend to retain the interior in authentic condition, but it will not run under its own power at the railway.

The Rail Trolley Trust loaned a Wickham trolley and an unpowered trailer to the railway in 2021. The powered vehicle is a type 17A trolley, works number 4091, which was built in 1961 for the Lochaber Railway at Fort William, Scotland. It was rescued for preservation in 1978 and spent some time at Gloddfa Ganol in Blaenau Ffestiniog and at Statfold Barn Railway in Tamworth before being moved to Crowle. The trailer was also originally a type 17A trolley, but was dismantled and no details of its works number or early history are known.

Following closure of the Bord na Móna system of peat railways in Ireland, the railway purchased a Hunslet Wagonmaster, number LM336 in June 2024. It was transported to Crowle, and was being serviced before being put into operational use.

== Bibliography ==
- Bateman, Stephanie (16 September 2016). "Trains to return to Crowle Moors". Gainsborough Standard. Archived from the original on 20 May 2019.
- Bateman, Stephanie (27 February 2023). "Crowle Peatland Railway has been shortlisted for a prestigious national award". Doncaster Free Press. Archived from the original on 4 February 2024.
- Bateman, Stephanie (21 June 2024). "Crowle Peatland Railway announces the exciting acquisition of historic Bord na Mona Wagonmaster Locomotive LM336". Doncaster Free Press. Archived from the original on 4 February 2024.
- Booth, Adrian (1998). The Peat Railways of Thorne and Hatfield Moors. Industrial Railway Society. ISBN 978-1-901556-04-9.
- Booth, Nigel (3 June 2019). "Crowle and Peatland Railway Society awarded £107,000 from North Lincolnshire Council". Doncaster Free Press. Archived from the original on 20 July 2019.
- Elliott, David (4 July 2017). "Green light for workshop as locomotive restoration project gathers pace". Scunthorpe Telegraph. Archived from the original on 6 July 2017.
- Keef, Alan M (2008). A Tale of Many Railways. Lightmoor Press. ISBN 978-1-899889-30-3.
- Leonard, Simon (13 September 2018). "Engineering students to restore historical locomotive to its former glory". Grimsby Telegraph. Archived from the original on 13 September 2018.
- Limbert, Martin; Roworth, Peter C (2009). "Mechanised Peat Winning and Transportation on Thorne Moors". THMCF Technical Report. Thorne and Hatfield Moors Conservation Forum. ISSN 1468-2087.
- Limbert, Martin (2011). "Peat Winning on Crowle Moor" (PDF). Peat exploitation of Thorne Moors. University of Bradford (Thesis). Archived (PDF) from the original on 20 May 2019.
- Stoneman, Rob (2006). "Peat bogs and climate change". Yorkshire Peat Partnership. Archived from the original on 4 March 2016.
- Townley, Angus (October 2013). "Crowle & Thorne Moors Peat Railway Society". Narrow Gauge World. No. 89. Warner Group. ISSN 1466-0180.
