= Warping in agriculture =

Warping was the former practice of letting turbid river water flood onto agricultural land, so that its suspended sediment could form a layer, before letting the water drain away. In this way poor soils were covered with fertile fine silt (or warp), and their rentable value was increased.

Warping was costly as specially made sluice gates had to be built, and embankments with sloping sides had to be constructed around the fields in order to contain the water. Water was allowed into the embanked fields, during the spring tides, through these gates, and when the tide was at its height, the gates were closed. As the tide ebbed, the water was allowed to escape slowly back into the river, having deposited most of its mud on the surface on the enclosure in which it had been penned. The result was a perfectly flat field, and if warping was carried out, during the several spring tides, for two or three years, a layer of fertile silt of perhaps a metre or more, would have been laid down. As the process was expensive it was generally the prerogative of wealthy landowners and could only practically be carried out where the land to be improved was in a few hands, and agreement could be reached to share the costs.

The first reliable report of warping seems to come in the 1730s from Rawcliffe, which is near the confluences of the Ouse with the Aire and the Don, where a small farmer called Barker used the technique. A few years later in 1743 Richard Jennings, from the neighbouring village of Airmyn, was warping on a greater scale.

Warping was particularly suited to the Humberhead Levels, as the high tides of the rivers Trent and Ouse, when combined with the adjacent low land situation of the fields to be warped, made the practicalities of the process relatively simple. Warping was also carried out in the Somerset Levels from about 1780.

In Lincolnshire, to the east of the river Trent, it may be that warping was last used on Brumby West Common near Scunthorpe in 1867. The technique was last employed to the west of the river at Medge Hall, Crowle just before the First World War.

== See also ==
- Thorne and Hatfield Moors
- Thorne and Hatfield Moors Peat Canals
- Swinefleet

== Bibliography ==
- R. Creyke, ‘Some account of the process of warping’ in Journal of the Royal Agricultural Society, vol. 5 (1845), pp. 398–405 Link
- M. Lillie, ‘Alluvium and warping in the Humberhead Levels’ in R. Van de Noort and S. Ellis (eds.), Wetland Heritage of the Humberhead Levels:an Archaeological Survey (Hull, 1997)
- M. Lillie, ‘Alluvium and warping in the lower Trent valley’ in R. Van de Noort and S. Ellis (eds.), Wetland Heritage of the Ancholme and Lower Trent Valleys: an Archaeological Survey (Hull, 1998 )
- D. Byford, ‘Agricultural change in the lowlands of south Yorkshire with special reference to the manor of Hatfield, 1600-c.1875’ (Unpublished PhD thesis. Sheffield, 2005), vol 1, chap 3.
- T. M. Smith, 'Enclosure & agricultural improvement in north-west Lincolnshire from circa 1600 to 1850' (Unpublished PhD thesis. Nottingham, 2012), chap 6.Link
