= William Bunting (eco-warrior) =

English environmentalist

- Bunting, in the 1990s
- Born: c. 1912
- Died: January 1995; Doncaster, England
- Occupations: Amateur naturalist Eco-warrior

William Bunting (c. 1912 – January 1995) was an amateur naturalist and eco-warrior who is credited with saving the wildlife habitat of Thorne Moors from the planned dumping of 32 million tons of fuel-ash, peat-cutting and drainage, and for campaigning for the reinstatement of public footpaths on maps of the same Moors.

== Background ==
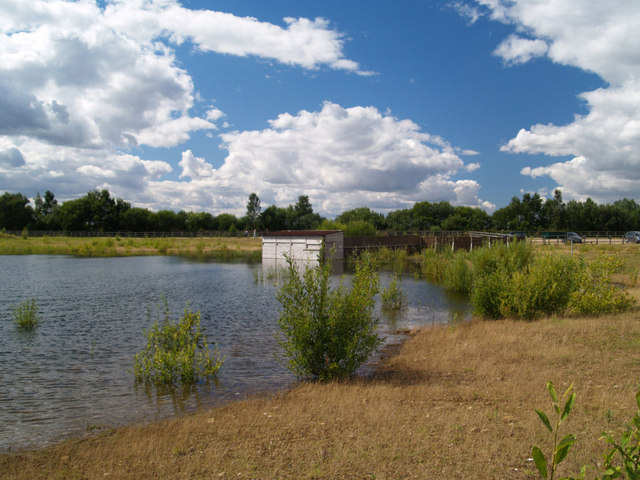
Result of Bunting's efforts: flooded peat and drainage works are now a nature reserve at Thorne Moors

He was born c. 1912. Between 1936 and 1939 was involved with Spanish Civil War anarchists, working as a courier and smuggler. He was later employed as an engineer's fitter. He was an auto-didactic naturalist and after 1950 on Thorne Moors he discovered an alga living on the antennae of water fleas. He contributed to the discovery of a Bronze Age trackway constructed of wood, buried on the same moors.

In the late 1940s he was diagnosed with tuberculosis and left the army with a pension and a severe inflammation of the vertebrae or Spondylopathy. Due to this he suffered pain and illness for the rest of his life, and this was possibly one of the reasons why he was described as "irascible, foul-mouthed and middle-aged", and a "crochety eccentric". He died in January 1995 in Doncaster at the age of 82.

== Activity at Thorne Moors ==
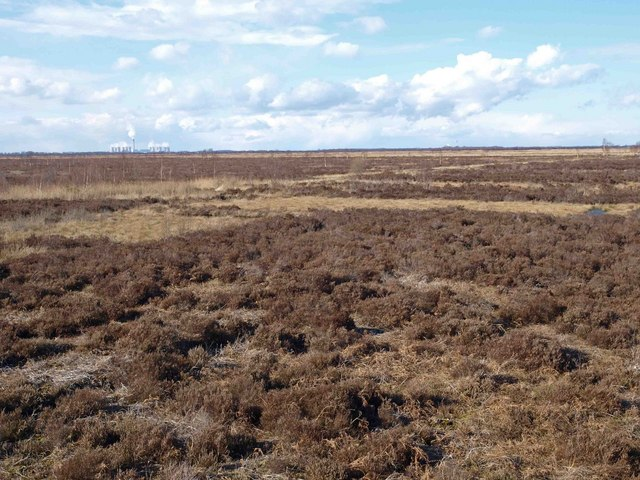
Thorne Moors in 2008

In 1952 there were no public footpaths shown across Thorne Moors on the map then published by West Riding County Council. Public rights of way were governed by regulations and laws, for the interpretation of which a knowledge of Latin, Middle English and Law French was required. While employed as an engineer's fitter, he taught himself these languages and legalese to challenge in Court what he saw as an illegal enclosure of Thorne Moors. As part of this process of legal challenge he regularly walked the traditional footpaths there, breaking through or removing barriers and confronting the landowners on their own land. He wrote daily protest letters to the authorities. He is said, by Catherine Caufield, to have carried weaponry, including a revolver, swordstick, machete, wire-cutters and his own calling cards to be defiantly left after removing footpath-barriers. He is quoted as saying, "What do you think I use them for, picking my bloody nose?" when asked whether he had fired the gun. The footpaths were reinstated on large-scale maps.

By the early 1960s, the Yorkshire Naturalists' Trust declined to object to a plan by the Central Electricity Generating Board for dumping 32 million tons of pulverised fuel ash from Drax power station onto Thorne Moors, which was then called Thorne Waste. The Trust's given reason was that the Moors were now wasteland (a historical term for unproductive land) due to farming and the digging of peat. In his role of protector of the Moors and assisted by Peter Skidmore, Bunting wrote strongly-worded letters and reports to the Trust, and pressured its leaders to view the situation on site. In 1969 he also led a group of naturalists in recording the flora and fauna of the Moors. In response, the Trust finally objected to the waste-dumping plan. This was not the only scheme of this type which was defeated by Bunting's tactics; he fought planners, developers and the Nature Conservancy Council as well. He said:

"I suggest that the essence of conservation lies with one simple word, NO! Don’t become like those prostitutes in the Nature Conservancy. Say no, mean no, fight to retain the places we have."

=== Bunting's Beavers ===
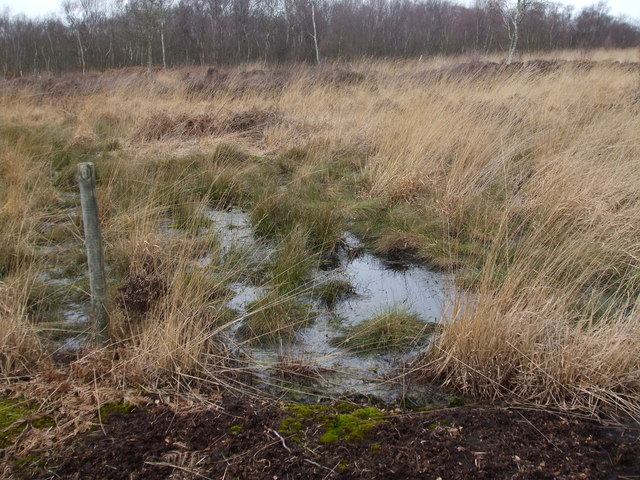
Peat bog on Thorne Moors 2009

William Bunting, with his own history of aggressive protection and his group of eco-warriors, is credited, by Catherine Caufield, with saving Thorne Moors from destruction as a natural habitat. In 1972, Bunting's Beavers was formed in response to Fisons' near destruction in 1971 of the rich heart of the Moors by the excavation of deep drains for peat extraction. The group consisted of Bunting, naturalists, students and local residents. On most spring and summer weekends of 1972, the Beavers dammed the drains, creating dozens of dams up to 40 feet across and preventing Fisons' employees from undoing their work. Matters came to a head when in October 1972 Fisons blew up eighteen dams following a BBC Television programme about the Beavers' eco-warrior activity in protection of the Moors. To counteract the resultant bad publicity, Fisons was then obliged to permit new dams to remain in place. The company signed an agreement to save Thorne Moors from peat-cutting and drainage and to reinforce the dams in the future. In 1970, Thorne Moors became a Site of Special Scientific Interest. In 1983, 180 acres of the Moors were purchased by the Nature Conservancy Council and the site became a national nature reserve as part of the Humberhead Levels.

== Bibliography ==
- Caufield, Catherine (1991). Thorne Moors (1st ed.). Canada: Sumach Press. ISBN 978-0712651660.
- Rotherham, Ian D. (2010). Yorkshire's Forgotten Fenlands. Wharncliffe Books. ISBN 978-1-845631-31-4.
- Bunting, W., Dolby, M.J., Howes, C. & Skidmore, P. (1969) An Outline study of Hatfield Chase. Unpubl. rep., Thorne.
