= Hatfield Chase =

Area of south Yorkshire/north Lincolnshire, England

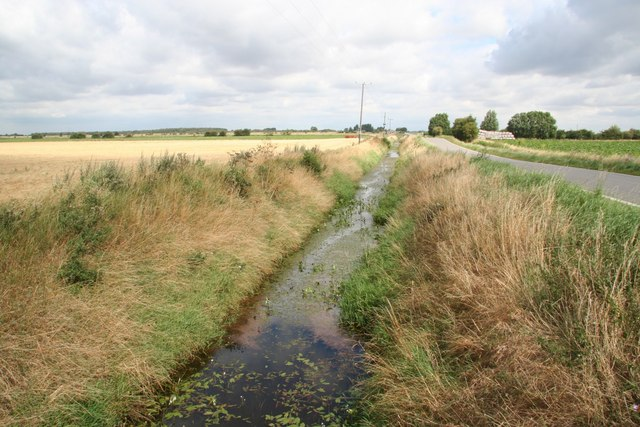
- The South Idle Bank drain looking towards Tunnel Pits

- Location within South Yorkshire
- OS grid reference: SE734040
- Metropolitan county: South Yorkshire
- Region: Yorkshire and the Humber
- Country: England
- Sovereign state: United Kingdom

Hatfield Chase is a low-lying area in South Yorkshire and North Lincolnshire, England, which was often flooded. It was a royal hunting ground until Charles I appointed the Dutch engineer Cornelius Vermuyden to drain it in 1626. The work involved the re-routing of the Rivers Don, Idle, and Torne, and the construction of drainage channels. It was not wholly successful, but changed the whole nature of a wide swathe of land including the Isle of Axholme, and caused legal disputes for the rest of the century. The civil engineer John Smeaton looked at the problem of wintertime flooding in the 1760s, and some remedial work was carried out.

Under the Hatfield Chase Drainage Act 1813 (53 Geo. 3. c. clxi), commissioners were appointed, and improvements to the drainage included the first steam pumping engine. The Corporation of the Level of Hatfield Chase was established by the Level of Hatfield Chase Act 1862 (25 & 26 Vict. c. cxl), and another pumping engine was installed. The drains ran to the northeastern corner of the Chase and continued to sluices at Althorpe on the River Trent. Discharge to the Trent was subsequently moved to Keadby, and the gravity drainage was supplemented by pumps when a pumping station was built in 1940. Steam engines were gradually replaced by diesel engines, and later by electric pumps. The Environment Agency maintains eight pumping stations on the chase, in addition to Keadby, and there are several smaller installations managed by the Corporation of the Level of Hatfield Chase Internal Drainage Board. Some of the pumping stations are reversible, allowing water to be extracted from the drains into the main rivers in winter, and pumped from the rivers into the drains for irrigation in summer.

== Location ==
Hatfield Chase is roughly bordered by the M18 motorway to the west, the River Ouse to the north, the River Idle to the south, and the A161 road through Epworth and the Isle of Axholme to the east. It covers an area of around 110 square miles (280 km^{2}), including two large peat bogs known as Thorne and Hatfield Moors, and is part of the once-vast Humberhead Levels, a wetland which originally covered some 770 square miles (2,000 km^{2}). The Chase is crossed by the River Torne, for which a new channel was cut by Vermuyden in 1628, as part of the drainage scheme implemented at that time. Further north, the two peat bogs were separated by the completion in 1802 of the Stainforth and Keadby Canal, running in an east-west direction between the two. In the 1970s, the Chase was further divided by the construction of the M180 motorway, which runs to the south of the canal but follows a similar course.

The Battle of Heathfield, fought in 633 between Penda of Mercia and Edwin of Northumbria may have occurred on Hatfield Chase, although it could also have taken place near Cuckney in Nottinghamshire, between Mansfield and Worksop, which also has places called Hatfield.

== History of the drainage ==
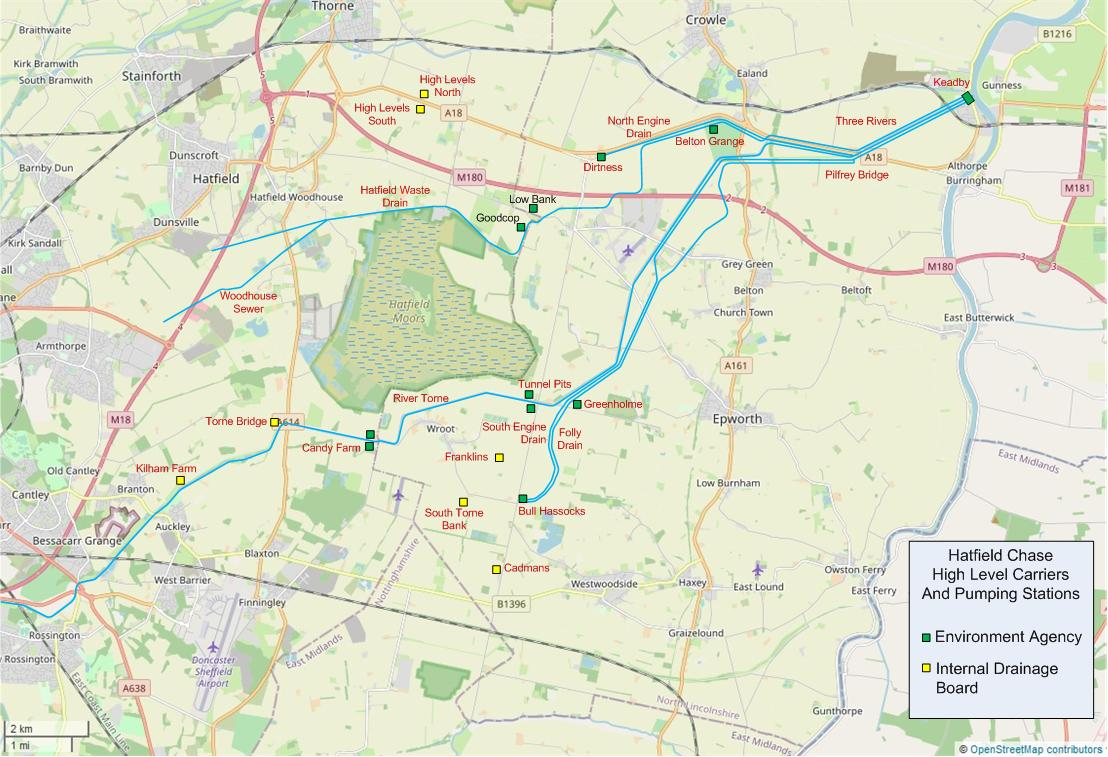
The Internal Drainage Board area showing modern high-level carriers and pumping stations

Hatfield Chase lay above the confluence of three rivers, the Don, the Torne, and the Idle, which meandered into the Trent near its entrance to the Humber. The whole of this area, apart from the Isle of Axholme, is less than 10 feet (3.0 m) above sea level and was therefore subject to frequent flooding. Although the area included some common land it was unlawful to take fish or game though many locals gained their livelihood by fishing and fowling the area which was unsuitable for agriculture.

The circumstances of Charles' appointment of Vermuyden to drain this area in 1626 are obscure. A story that he had accompanied an earlier royal hunting party is almost certainly fictional, but the king was keen to make his assets profitable and the contract divided the land into three parts, one for the king, one for the adventurers who would drain the land and the remainder for those locals who had interests in the land.

Vermuyden brought over a number of Walloon partners, known as the Participants, who took shares and performed the drainage work, including a number of Huguenot families fleeing from religious persecution who settled at Sandtoft. The work was substantially completed by 1628 at a cost of £400,000.

The eastern branch of the Don river was blocked and the banks of the northern branch into the River Aire were raised. The northern branch was originally a Roman navigation channel called Turnbridgedike. A 2-mile (3.2 km) bank which ran along the south side of the river from Fishlake to Thorne included a navigable sluice, to allow boats to reach Sandtoft. Lifting gates gave access to a lock chamber which was 50 by 15 feet (15.2 by 4.6 m). Beyond Thorne, a further bank ran for 5 miles (8 km) to the Aire. The River Idle was blocked by a dam and its waters were diverted into the River Trent at Stockwith along Bycarrs Dyke. A 5-mile (8 km) barrier bank was constructed along the northern edge of the channel, from the dam to the River Trent. The Torne was embanked and straightened by cutting a drain which emptied via a sluice into the Trent at Althorpe. An 8-mile (13 km) drain was cut from where the Idle had been blocked to Dirtness, passing under the Torne at Tunnel Pits. At Dirtness it was joined by another drain, bringing water from the west, and then ran for a further 5 miles (8 km) to another sluice at Althorpe. The work was on a scale not previously seen in England, and Vermuyden's contribution was recognised when he was knighted in January 1629. In 1629, a Court of Sewers for the Level of Hatfield Chase was established by royal warrant.

The drainage transformed the whole area, creating rich agricultural land where there had previously been swamps though it was still subject to periodic flooding.

Many local people were not very happy with the outcome. Those entitled to common rights, mainly from the Isle of Axholme, claimed they had been allotted the worst land. There were complaints of flooding from those further down the Don in the villages of Fishlake, Sykehouse, and Snaith. Recrimination against foreign settlers was encouraged by those who had lost their fishing and other livelihoods.

The flooding of Fishlake and Sykehouse resulted from there being insufficient washlands to hold the flow of the Don while the sluice at Turnbridgedike was closed by high water levels in the Aire. A navigable sluice was constructed at Turnbridgedike, including a lock chamber which was 60 by 18 feet (18.3 by 5.5 m) and 17 discharge gates, each 6 by 8 feet (1.8 by 2.4 m). The structure was probably built by Hugo Spiering, who assisted Vermuyden, and was called the Great Sluice. This still did not fully alleviate the problems of flooding, and so a new 5-mile (8 km) embanked channel was constructed from Newbridge to the River Ouse at Goole between 1632 and 1635. The river levels at Goole were some 5 to 10 feet (1.5 to 3.0 m) lower than at Turnbridgedike, and so discharge was more efficient. The total cost of the channel and outfall sluice was £33,000. There was no navigable connection to the Ouse at Goole, as boats continued to access the Aire at Turnbridgedike. The channel eventually became the wide Dutch River after two drains were swept into one following a great flood.

After various lawsuits and petitions, locals took action during the confusion of the Civil War and flooded Hatfield Chase by raising floodgates and damaging banks and sluices. Riots broke out when the courts finally ruled against them in 1650. Peace was restored, but lawsuits continued for the rest of the century and were not finally resolved until 1719.

== Development ==
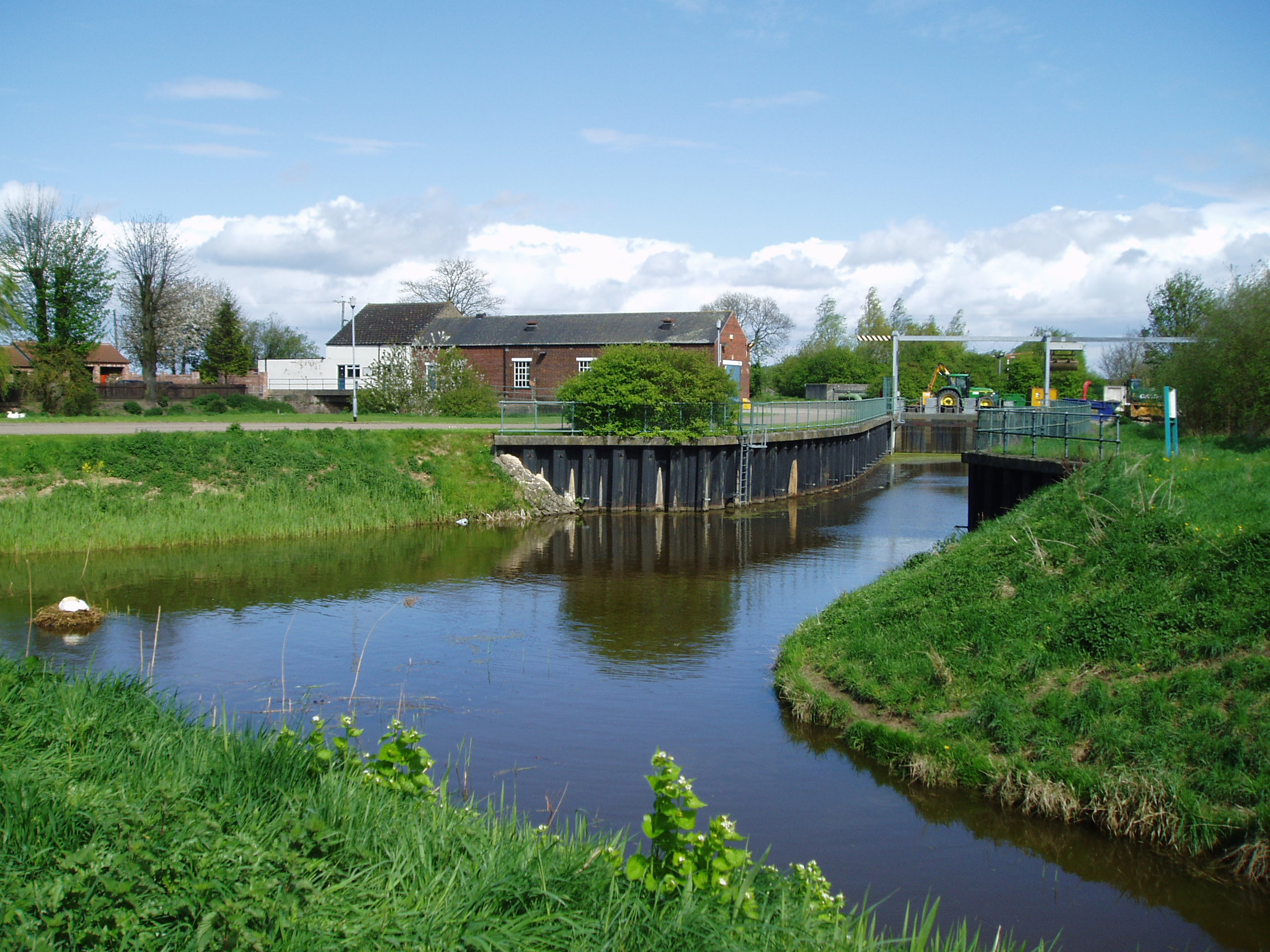
The pumping station at Bull Hassocks. The South Engine Drain runs from behind the station to the River Trent

The region was still affected by wintertime flooding in the 18th century, and the civil engineer John Smeaton was asked to make an assessment. He produced reports in September 1764 and October 1776, which formed the basis for remedial work. This was carried out in stages from 1776 until it was completed in 1789.

Improvements continued in the early 19th century, authorised by several acts of Parliament. The Hatfield Chase Drainage Act 1813 created two commissioners, who had powers to raise £15,000, to be used for construction work specified by the act, which would be adopted by the Court of Sewers once it was completed. The money was raised by additional taxation on those who benefitted from the works. There was also a special engine rate, which was used to finance the operation of a steam-pumping engine in the southern part of the chase. The steam engine was sited at Little Hirst in 1848, but experience showed that it needed to be nearer to the drainage district, and so it was moved to Bull Hassocks in 1858. A second-hand 40 hp (30 kW) engine drove a 30-foot (9.1 m) scoop wheel.

To improve the drainage of the Chase, the Level of Hatfield Chase Act 1862 created the Corporation of the Level of Hatfield Chase, which took over the management of the drainage from the individual Participants who had formerly been responsible for it. This act authorised further construction work, including a steam-pumping engine for the northern part of the Chase. The areas which were subject to taxation were extended, and the act listed 21 townships and parishes which would be required to pay for the drainage works. The jurisdiction of the Court of Sewers was replaced by the meetings of the corporation in 1862. The corporation spent £8,887 on a new pumping station at Dirtness which was operational by 1865. The building contained two compound beam engines, driving a single scoop wheel which was 33.25 by 6 feet (10.13 by 1.83 m) and weighed 80 tons. Bull Hassocks pumping station was upgraded in 1892. Two 48-inch (120 cm) centrifugal pumps were driven by 175 horsepower (130 kW) steam engines, and when both were running, the station could discharge 300 tons per minute (440 Megalitres per day (Mld)) into the South Engine Drain. Diesel engines gave way to electric pumps at Dirtness in 1928, when they were replaced by a Gwynnes Limited pump driven by an electric motor.

The Land Drainage Act 1930 changed the administrative bodies responsible for drainage, and the corporation effectively became an Internal Drainage Board. The River Ouse (Yorks.) and the River Trent Catchment Boards (Transfer of Powers of Corporation of Level of Hatfield Chase) Order 1941, the corporation ceased to be, and its powers and responsibilities were split between the Trent River Catchment Board and the River Ouse (Yorkshire) Catchment Board. Despite this change, the management of the area continued much as before, with official records stating that the catchment board acted as the Corporation of the Level of Hatfield Chase, even though it no longer existed legally. This continued with the renaming of the Trent River Catchment Board to the Trent River Board, and then the Trent River Authority, which finally became part of the Severn Trent Water Authority in 1974. In an unusual move, the Corporation of the Level of Hatfield Chase was re-constituted in 1987, by an order of the Ministry of Agriculture, Fisheries and Food (United Kingdom)|Ministry of Agriculture, Fisheries and Food, the Severn-Trent Water Authority (Reconstitution of the Corporation of the Level of Hatfield Chase) Order 1987 (SI 1987/1928). The order cited the powers of the 1813 and 1862 acts and transferred the property and responsibilities for drainage of the area from Severn Trent to the corporation.

Upgrading of the pumping stations continued. The steam engines at Bull Hassocks were replaced by a single Ruston 300 hp (220 kW) diesel engine with a 36-inch (91 cm) Gwynnes pump in 1940, to be supplemented by two more similar units in 1941. By 1988 two electric pumps had been installed, and the station could discharge 330 tons per minute (485 Mld). At Dirtness, the single electric pump was supplemented by two more in 1951, rated at 105 brake horsepower (78 kW) and each capable of moving 110 tons per minute (161 Mld).

== Watercourses ==
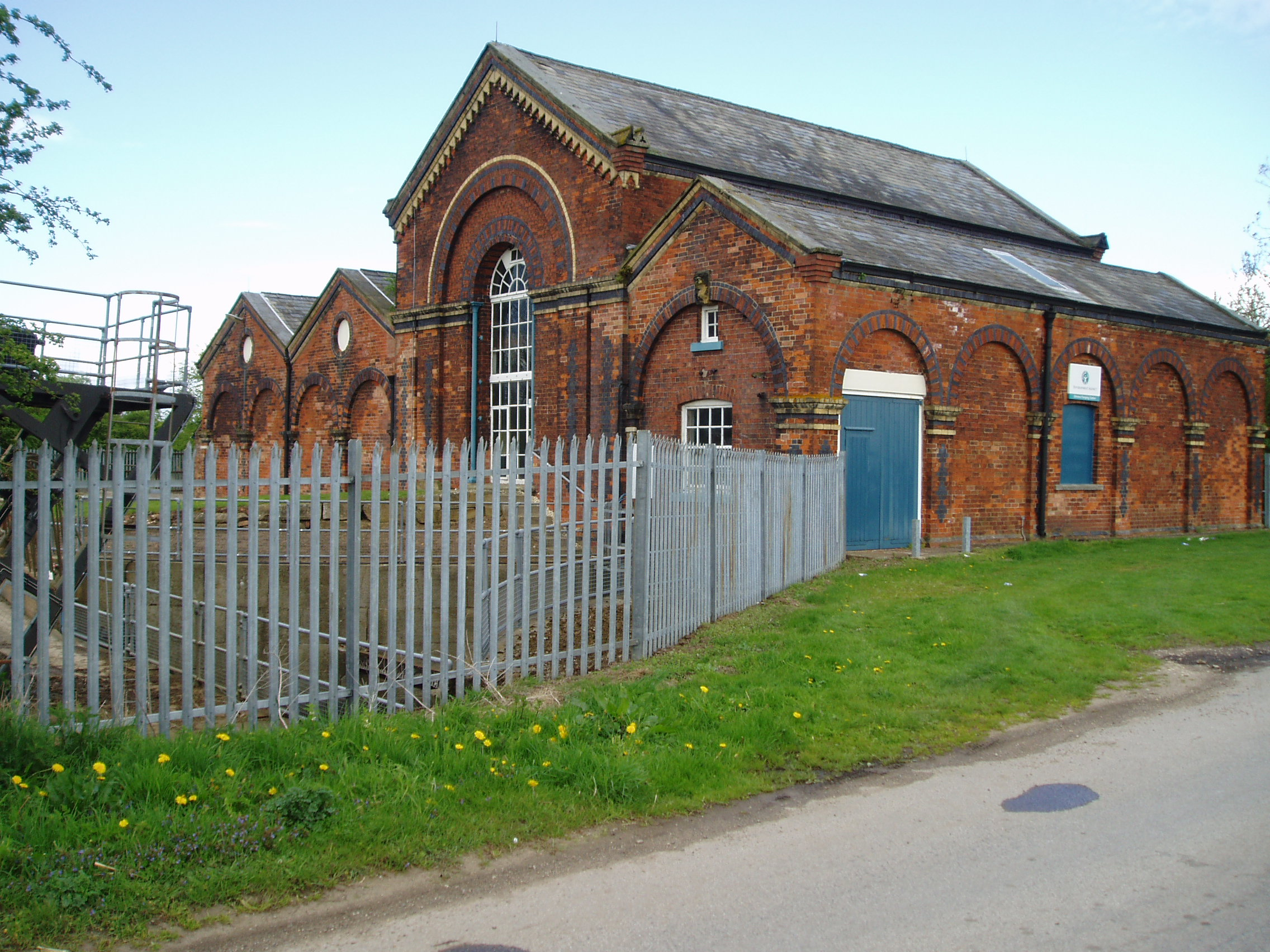
The pumping station at Dirtness, at the start of the North Engine Drain

Today the watercourses of Hatfield Chase are managed by the Corporation of the Level of Hatfield Chase Internal Drainage Board. They are responsible for the drainage of an area of 30.8 square miles (79.8 km^{2}), and the maintenance of 84.5 miles (136.0 km) of watercourses, which includes the operation of nine pumping stations. In addition, the Environment Agency maintain and operate several pumping stations within the area where the water is pumped into high-level carriers, which consist of embanked waterways where the water level is generally above that of the surrounding land.

The River Torne, which rises to the west of Tickhill, crosses the middle of the area. Candy Farm North and South pumping stations are situated on the area's western edge. The South Engine Drain and Folly Drain form the eastern boundary and run parallel to the River Torne after it has crossed the Chase. Bull Hassocks pumping station is located at the start of the South Engine Drain and is on the site of the first steam-powered pumping station. Hatfield Waste Drain and the North Engine Drain run along the northern boundary. Tunnel Pits North and South pumping stations are located on the River Torne, while Dirtness pumping station is at the head of the North Engine Drain. The buildings there were erected in 1862. All of these watercourses converge on Pilfrey Junction, from where three parallel channels, called Three Rivers, flow to a pumping station at Keadby. The Hatfield Waste Drain crosses under the North Engine Drain before the junction and then becomes the north channel. The centre channel is formed by the North Engine Drain and the River Torne, while the south channel carries the waters of the South Engine Drain and the Folly Drain.

Bull Hassocks pumping station was designed to handle water from the South Idle drains, but prior to 1970 also had to handle water from the Folly Drain. This was altered in that year, by building a new pumping station at Greenholme, which pumped the Folly Drain into the South Level Engine Drain. The station was built by the Trent River Board for the West Axholme IDB, and contained three pumps, two of 24-inch (610 mm) diameter, capable of pumping 109 Mld, and one of 15-inch (380 mm) rated at 29 Mld. The area was affected by the motorway construction programme of the late 1970s and early 1980s, which saw the M18 motorway running along the western edge of the Chase and the M180 motorway crossing it, broadly parallel to the Stainforth and Keadby Canal, but a little further south. The roads produced large volumes of run-off water, which entered the drainage system.

The river authorities used the opportunity to upgrade the system to cope with this run-off and to solve several local problems. Low Bank pumping station was built in 1977, incorporating three pumps. Another three pumps were installed on the former Sandtoft Airfield (now the location of a Trolleybus museum) at Wood Carr pumping station, built in 1978, and a single pump was installed at Belton Grange in the following year. All three stations discharge water to the Hatfield Waste Drain. The Internal Drainage Boards also had to upgrade some of their pumps to cope with the extra volumes of water.

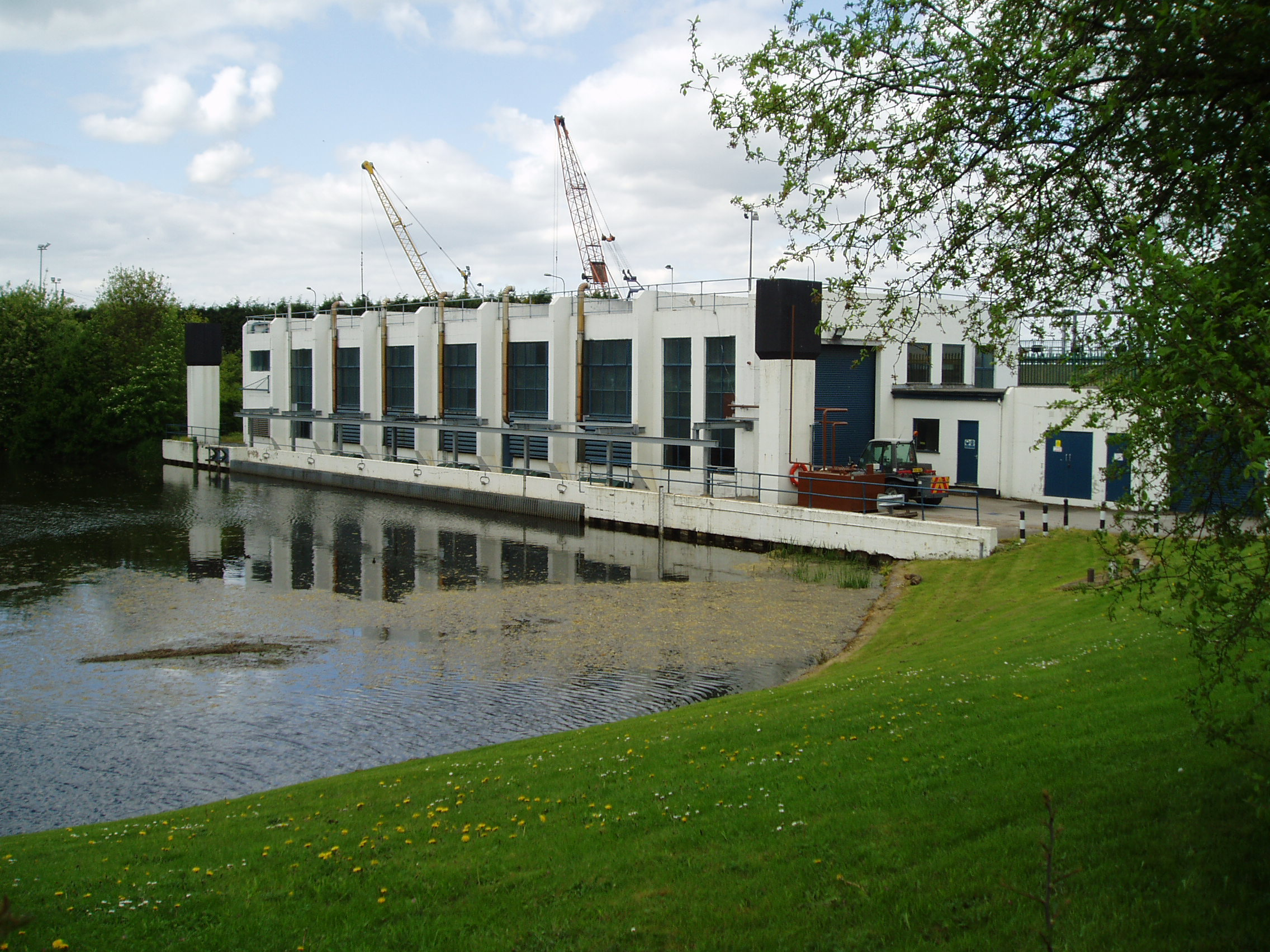
Keadby pumping station

The pumping station at Keadby is equipped with six concrete culverts and six pumps. It was built in 1940, when six Crossley diesel engines, rated at 420 hp (310 kW) and driving 60-inch (150 cm) Gwynnes pumps were installed. Five were refurbished by the National Rivers Authority in 1994, and the sixth was replaced by an electric motor. Discharge into the River Trent is through the culverts when the water level in the river is low enough, and through the pumps when it is not. A number of the pumping stations within the Chase are reversible, so that water is pumped from the drainage ditches to the high level carriers when there is a risk of flooding, and from the carriers to the ditches when water is needed for irrigation. The Environment Agency also have pumping stations at Belton Grange, Goodcop and Low Bank, which pump into the Hatfield Waste Drain.

== Locations of pumping stations ==
Point	Coordinates (Links to map resources)	OS Grid Ref	Notes
Keadby	53.592°N 0.740°W	SE834112	Outlet to River Trent
Belton Grange	53.585°N 0.838°W	SE770104	On Hatfield Waste Drain
Bull Hassocks	53.507°N 0.897°W	SE732017	Start of South Engine Drain
Candy Farm	53.520°N 0.948°W	SE698030	On River Torne
Dirtness	53.580°N 0.869°W	SE774098	Start of North Engine Drain
Goodcop	53.566°N 0.891°W	SE735082	On Hatfield Waste Drain
Greenholme	53.527°N 0.882°W	SE741039	On South Engine Drain
Low Bank	53.568°N 0.887°W	SE738085	On Hatfield Waste Drain
Tunnel Pits	53.528°N 0.893°W	SE734040	On River Torne

The table shows the locations of the major Environment Agency pumping stations which are located within Hadfield Chase, with the addition of Keadby, where water drained from the region is pumped into the River Trent.

== See also ==
- Goole Fields
- Thorne and Hatfield Moors for details of peat extraction and gas storage
- Thorne and Hatfield Moors Peat Canals

== Bibliography ==
- Booth, A. J. (1998). Peat Railways of Thorne and Hatfield Moors. Industrial Railway Society. ISBN 978-1-901556-04-9.
- Cory, Vernon (1985). Hatfield and Axholme – An Historical Review. Providence Press. ISBN 978-0-903803-15-1.
- EA (February 2013). "Idle & Torne Abstraction licensing strategy" (PDF). Environment Agency. Archived from the original on 8 June 2014.
- Hinde, K. S. G. (2006). Fenland Pumping Engines. Landmark Publishing Ltd. ISBN 978-1-84306-188-5.
- Korthals-Altes, J. (1925). Sir Cornelius Vermuyden. London: Williams and Norgate.
- Nicholson (2006). Nicholson Guides Vol 6: Nottingham, York and the North East. Harper Collins. ISBN 978-0-00-721114-2.
- Rotherham, Ian D. (2010). Yorkshire's Forgotten Fenlands. Wharncliffe Books. ISBN 978-1-845631-31-4.
- Skempton, Sir Alec (2002). A Biographical Dictionary of Civil Engineers in Great Britain and Ireland: 1500 to 1830. Thomas Telford. ISBN 978-0-7277-2939-2.
