= River Torne (England) =

River in the north of England

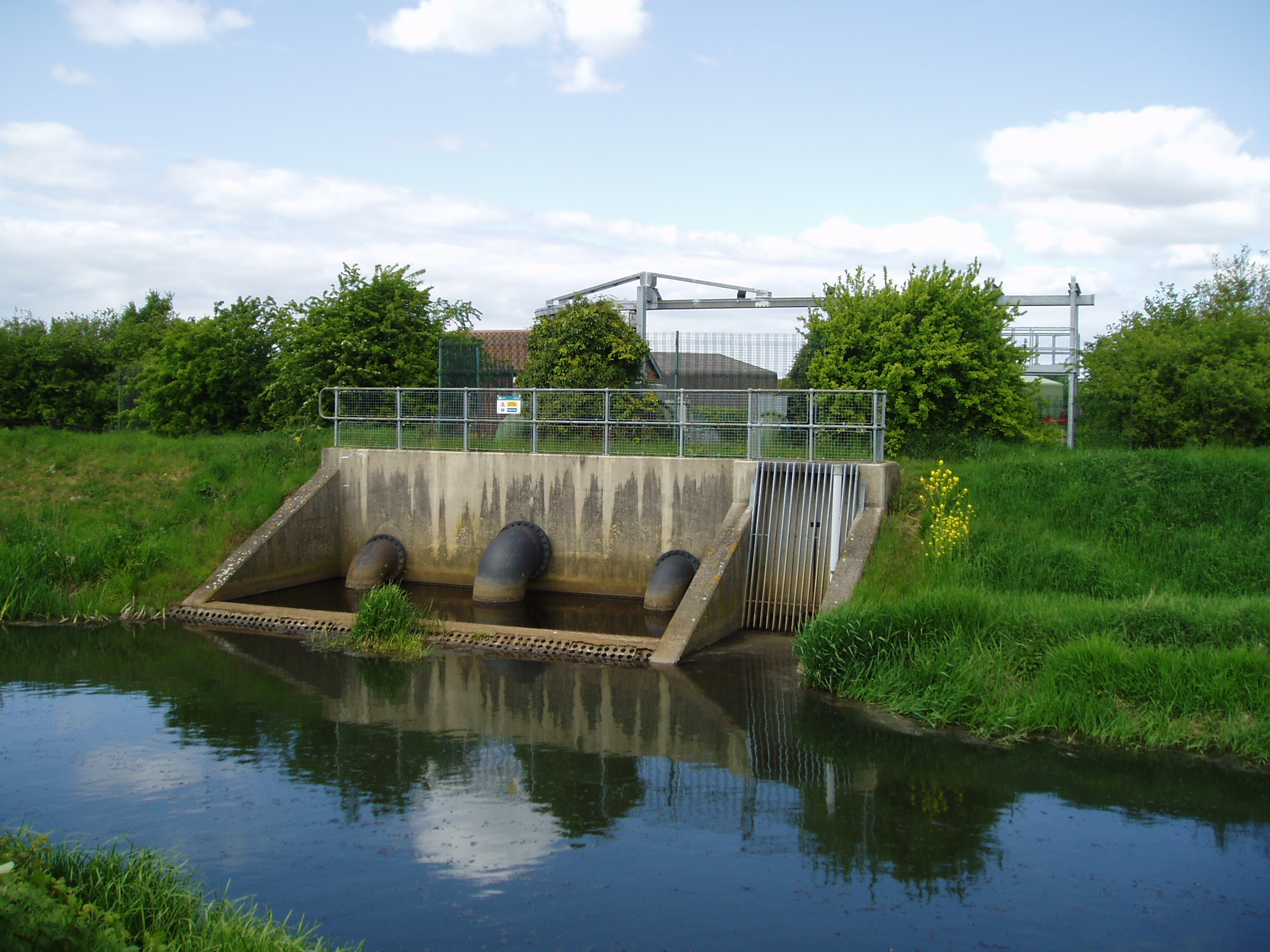
- The outfall from Candy Farm North pumping station into the Torne

Location
- Country: England
- Counties: South Yorkshire, North Lincolnshire

Physical characteristics
- Source
  - location: Sandbeck Hall, Maltby, South Yorkshire
- Mouth
  - location: Keadby, North Lincolnshire

The River Torne is a river in the north of England, which flows through the counties of South Yorkshire and North Lincolnshire. It rises at the Upper Lake at Sandbeck Hall, in Maltby in South Yorkshire, and empties into the River Trent at Keadby pumping station. Much of the channel is engineered, as it plays a significant role in the drainage of Hatfield Chase, which it crosses.

The first major change occurred around 1628, when the drainage engineer Cornelius Vermuyden cut a new channel for the river across the Isle of Axholme, and built a sluice at Althorpe where it entered the River Trent. Nearly 90 years of civil unrest followed, before the issues of flooding were finally resolved. Drainage of the land bordering the river was carried out in the 1760s and 1770s. A new sluice was built at Keadby, lower downstream on the Trent in the 1780s, but the Torne was not re-routed to it until much later. The sluice at Keadby became a pumping station in 1940, and the option to pump water into the Trent at all states of the tide led to the abandonment of the Althorpe outfall, and the routing of the Torne to Keadby.

There are a number of pumping stations along the course of the river. Tickhill pumping station was built in the 1970s, to handle water from the Middle Drain, which crosses an area affected by mining subsidence. It was managed on behalf of the Coal Board by Tickhill Internal Drainage Board (IDB), now part of Doncaster East IDB. There are Environment Agency pumping stations at Candy Farm and Tunnel Pits.

== History ==
Before 1628, much of the area through which the River Torne now passes was waterlogged, and the river system was quite different. The River Don flowed across Hatfield Chase from Stainforth to Adlingfleet. The River Idle flowed northwards from the point later called Idle Stop, and joined the Don near to Sandtoft, while the Torne formed two channels to the west of Wroot, both of which joined the Idle.

In 1626, Cornelius Vermuyden was given the task of draining Hatfield Chase, and he radically altered the rivers. The Don was routed northwards from Stainforth, to join the River Aire near Turn Bridge near East Cowick (grid reference SE668215), while the Idle was dammed at Idle Stop, and routed eastwards to join the Trent at West Stockwith. This left the Torne with no outfall, and a completely new channel was constructed for it, which was embanked on both sides. It ran in a north-easterly direction from Wroot for six miles (ten kilometres), crossing the Isle of Axholme, and then turned to the east for 3 mi (5 km), where it entered the Trent at a sluice near Althorpe. At the same time, a drain was constructed which ran northwards from Idle Stop in a straight line for 8 mi (13 km) to Dirtness. It passed under the new channel of the Torne at Tunnel Pits. At Dirtness it was joined by another new drain, some 3 mi (5 km) long, flowing in from the west, and the combined flow was carried to the east for a further 5 mi (8 km), to enter the Trent at another sluice at Althorpe. The Torne sluice was 11 feet (3.4 m) wide, and the sluice on the drain was 14 feet (4.3 m) wide.

The new route of the Torne was not entirely successful. It crossed fertile parture land to the north-west of the Isle of Axholme, but the banks were not sufficiently large to hold the maximum volume of water which the river could deliver, and the agricultural land was subject to flooding. There was dissatisfaction among the inhabitants of the Hatfield Chase area with the effects of the drainage scheme, which resulted in riots and damage to the work. A series of lawsuits followed, and the situation was not finally resolved until 1719.

In the 1760s, there were plans to drain Potteric Carr, an area of wetland to the south of Doncaster covering 4,250 acres (1,720 hectares). The engineers John Smeaton and James Brindley were responsible for the plans, but Thomas Tofield, a botanist and civil engineer who lived nearby at Balby, directed the project when work began in 1765 or 1766. The first stages involved a new channel for the Torne, and the construction of the Mother Drain, the main drainage channel for the area, together with two branch drains. These were completed by 1768. Doncaster Corporation then divided up the Carr and enclosed it, and when this was completed in 1771, Trustees took over the management of the scheme. Further work was done between 1772 and 1777, again with Tofield directing, and Mathias Scott acting as resident engineer and surveyor. By the time the scheme was completed, 4.6 miles (7.4 km) of the river channel had been rerouted, the Mother Drain had been extended to 4 1/2 mi (7 km), and 3 mi (5 km) of catchwater drains had been built.

The fall on the Mother Drain was very low, but Smeaton had designed it with a channel, the bottom of which was below the level of the outfall. In a separate dispute over the design of drains for Deeping Fen, he explained how he had used the extra depth at Potteric Carr, since the flow increases depending on the ratio of the cross-sectional area to the wetted perimeter, when the gradient of the channel is less than four inches per mile (6 cm/km). The sluice which connected the Mother Drain to the Torne was designed by Scott in 1772. Scott resigned his post in April 1774, to move to Thorne and to work for the Trustees of Hatfield Chase. One of his first suggestions was to divert the Torne out of the Chase altogether, by making a new cut for it to the River Don at Thorne. Thomas Yeoman proposed an alternative scheme, which involved routing the drains away from Althorpe to a new outfall some 4 mi (6 km) downstream on the Trent.

Scott produced a report on both schemes in October 1775, but the cost of acquiring the land outside of the Chase was a major disadvantage. Exactly a year later, Smeaton produced a detailed report on the Torne, and work began, but some alterations were made as the scheme progressed. Scott suggested that the northern drain should be re-routed to Keadby, and then steered the bill through Parliament. The Act of Parliament was obtained in March 1783, before he retired in June. Samuel Foster replaced him, built the new drain and outfall at Keadby, and built separate outfalls at Althorpe for the Torne and the southern drain. The reconstruction was completed by 1789.

In 1813, the South Engine Drain was routed under the Torne through a syphon, and became the third of the Three Rivers. The 1887 Ordnance Survey map shows only the Torne flowing eastwards from Pilfrey Bridge. As it approaches Althorpe, it splits into two, and uses both of the sluices into the Trent. The Folly Drain turns to the south and joins the Trent at Derrythorpe. By 1946/51, maps show a connection between the Torne and the middle of the Three Rivers, with a connection between the middle channel and the east channel downstream of Pilfrey Bridge. By 1966, the channels are inter-connected much as they are today, with a sluice between the Folly Drain and the South Engine Drain, and the sluices at Althorpe and Derrythorpe no longer used.

The outlet into the River Trent at Keadby was by gravity until 1940, when the pumping station was built to assist when water levels in the Trent are too high to allow for gravity discharge. Six 60-inch (150 cm) Gwynnes pumps were powered by 420-horsepower (310-kilowatt) Crossley diesel engines, but one of them was replaced by an electric motor in 1994, when the engines were refurbished by the National Rivers Authority. It was the availability of power, which enabled water to be discharged to the Trent at all states of the tide that led to the routing of the Torne and the Folly Drain to Keadby, and the abandonment of the Althorpe and Derrythorpe outfalls.

== Internal drainage ==
Following the passing of the Land Drainage Act 1930, internal drainage boards were set up to manage low-lying areas prone to flooding. The area to the east of Tickhill, surrounding the Torne from where it crosses the A60 road to a little below the junction with the Middle Drain, has been managed by the Tickhill Internal Drainage Board since 1931. They are responsible for an area of 10 square miles (26 km^{2}), which includes 9 mi (14 km) of watercourses. Most of these flow into the Torne by gravity, but the Middle Drain has suffered from subsidence, and a pumping station was installed in the 1970s to overcome this. The IDB operates the station on behalf of the National Coal Board, who own it. In April 2012, Tickhill IDB became part of the much larger Doncaster East Internal Drainage Board.

== Route ==
The River Torne rises in the grounds of Sandbeck Hall, the home of the Earl of Scarborough. The house is a grade I listed structure, and was originally built in 1626 for Sir Nicholas Saunderson. James Paine extended it in the 1760s for the fourth Earl, and the interior was remodelled for the ninth Earl by William Burn in 1857. The grounds were landscaped by Capability Brown, and he created the Upper Lake and the Lower Lake, from which the river flows. The Upper Lake is close to the 130-foot (40 m) contour, but the outlet to the river is at the 98-foot (30 m) contour.

The river flows to the east, and within a short distance it has dropped below the 49-foot (15 m) before it is crossed by the A60 Oldcotes to Tickhill road at the foot of Malpas Hill. It turns to the north to pass under the embankment of the dismantled railway which used to serve Firbeck Colliery at Langold, and the industrial railway which serves Harworth Colliery. The river is joined by a number of drainage dikes and ditches as it crosses Tickhill Low Common, to the south of Tickhill. The common and the river are crossed by the Doncaster Bypass section of the A1(M) motorway, which is built on an embankment here and was one of the earliest motorways built in Britain, opening in July 1961.

Next it passes under the A631 Tickhill to Bawtry road at Goole Bridge. The river carries the alternative name of Goole Dike at this point. The Middle Drain joins the river just before it crosses the 16-foot (5 m) contour, and the western bank is embanked as it passes Reedy Holmes Plantation. Already the meandering course of the river has been replaced by straight sections with tight bends. The Little Mother Drain, which drains Stancil Carr and Wellingley Low Grounds, joins before the river passes around the western edge of the huge spoil heap of Rossington Main Colliery, and St Catherine's Well Stream, which flows eastwards from a well between Loversall and Balby joins at the northern edge of the spoil heap. The channel is embanked at a number of locations from here onwards. To the north of Rossington it turns to the east to pass under the East Coast Main Line railway, and then the A638 Great North Road at Rossington Bridge, which it shares with the Mother Drain. This drains the area around Doncaster International Railport and the Potteric Carr Nature Reserve, and the flows combine after the bridge, near the site of some Roman pottery kilns and Wheatcroft fishing lakes.

Next to cross are the Doncaster to Gainsborough railway line and the B1396 road at Auckley Bridge. The Aldam Drain drains Cantley Low Common, and beyond the junction, the river becomes a high level carrier, with permanent embanking of both banks, and catchwater drains running along the foot of both banks. At Candy Farm there are two pumping stations, the southern one pumping the Black Bank Drain into the river, and the northern one pumping the East Ring Drain. At Tunnel Pits, there are two more pumping stations, and Tunnel Pits Bridge carries the road which follows Vermuyden's North Idle Drain over the channel. Soon, the South Engine Drain is running parallel to the river, as it crosses under Sandtoft Road and the M180 motorway. As it turns to the east again, the Folly Drain also runs parallel, but a little beyond the A161 bridge, the two drains continue to the east, while the river diverts to the north, to run parallel to the North Engine Drain. The Hatfield Waste Drain runs parallel to the North Engine Drain on its south bank, but after the approach on the Torne, there was nowhere for it to go, and so it passes under the North Engine Drain to its north bank through a grade II listed syphon, which was probably built by Samual Foster in 1795 or by Thackray in 1813 as part of a series of improvements recommended by the engineer John Rennie.

The three parallel channels, with the A18 running to the south of the Hatfield Waste Drain, arrive at Pilfrey Bridge, where they are joined by the South Engine Drain and the Folly Drain. The River Torne used to continue eastwards to a sluice at Althorpe, but the sluice is no more and the channel drains in the reverse direction. The South Engine Drain, which was built as part of improvements made in 1795, used to pass under the Torne and the road through another grade II listed syphon, which dates from 1813. The syphon is now redundant, since the channels have been connected together. Three parallel channels, known as the Three Rivers, flow to the north east, passing under the Doncaster to Scunthorpe railway, to arrive at Keadby pumping station.

== Water quality ==
The Environment Agency assesses the water quality of the river systems in England. Each is given an overall ecological status, which may be one of five levels: high, good, moderate, poor and bad. There are several components that are used to determine this, including biological status, which looks at the quantity and varieties of invertebrates, angiosperms and fish. Chemical status, which compares the concentrations of various chemicals against known safe concentrations, is rated good or fail.

The water quality of the Torne was as follows in 2019.

Section	Ecological Status	Chemical Status	Length	Catchment	Channel
Torne from Source to Ruddle (Paper Mill Dyke)	Moderate	Fail	4.1 miles (6.6 km)	3.90 square miles (10.1 km^{2})	
Torne from Ruddle to St Catherine's Well Stream	Poor	Fail	5.1 miles (8.2 km)	11.31 square miles (29.3 km^{2})	
Torne from St Catherine's Well Stream to Mother Drain	Poor	Fail	2.8 miles (4.5 km)	6.81 square miles (17.6 km^{2})	
Torne/Three Rivers from Mother Drain to Trent	Moderate	Fail	31.4 miles (50.5 km)	32.93 square miles (85.3 km^{2})	artificial

Reasons for the ecological quality being less than good include discharge from sewage treatment works, disharge from the transport infrastructure, runoff from agricultural land, and in the case of the Ruddle to St Catherine's Well section, leaching of cadmium and zinc compounds from abandoned mine workings. Like most rivers in the UK, the chemical status changed from good to fail in 2019, due to the presence of polybrominated diphenyl ethers (PBDE), perfluorooctane sulphonate (PFOS) and mercury compounds, none of which had previously been included in the assessment.

== Points of interest ==
Point	Coordinates (Links to map resources)	OS Grid Ref	Notes
Keadby pumping station	53.5916°N 0.7405°W	SE834112	mouth
Pilfrey Bridge	53.5799°N 0.7796°W	SE808099	start of three rivers
M180 bridge	53.5707°N 0.8383°W	SE770088	
Tunnel Pits	53.5275°N 0.8917°W	SE735039	pumping stations
Candy Farm	53.5195°N 0.9490°W	SE697030	pumping stations
Junction with Aldam Drain	53.5170°N 0.9910°W	SE670027	
Junction with Mother Drain	53.4961°N 1.0397°W	SE638003	
Junction with Little Mother Drain	53.4703°N 1.1015°W	SK597974	
A1(M) bridge	53.4247°N 1.0931°W	SK603923	
Sandbeck Hall Upper Lake	53.4087°N 1.1419°W	SK571905	source

== Bibliography ==
- Cory, Vernon (1985). Hatfield and Axholme - An Historical Review. Providence Press. ISBN 0-903803-15-1.
- Hinde, K. S. G. (2006). Fenland Pumping Engines. Landmark Publishing Ltd. ISBN 1-84306-188-0.
- Owen, Sue; et al. (2005). Rivers and the British Landscape. Carnegie Publishing. ISBN 978-1-85936-120-7.
- Skempton, Sir Alec; et al. (2002). A Biographical Dictionary of Civil Engineers in Great Britain and Ireland: 1500 to 1830. Thomas Telford. ISBN 0-7277-2939-X.
