= Swinefleet =

Village and civil parish in the East Riding of Yorkshire, England

Coordinates: 53.689598°N 0.833992°W

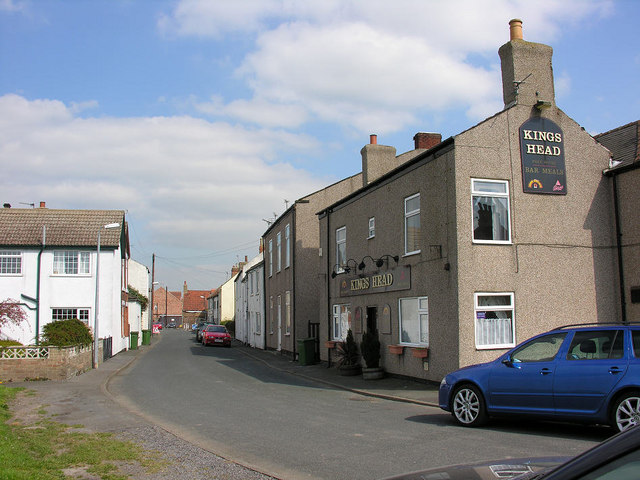
- Swinefleet High Street

- Location within the East Riding of Yorkshire
- Population: 787 (2011 census)
- OS grid reference: SE770220
- Civil parish: Swinefleet
- Unitary authority: East Riding of Yorkshire
- Ceremonial county: East Riding of Yorkshire
- Region: Yorkshire and the Humber
- Country: England
- Sovereign state: United Kingdom
- Post town: GOOLE
- Postcode district: DN14
- Dialling code: 01405
- Police: Humberside
- Fire: Humberside
- Ambulance: Yorkshire
- UK Parliament: Goole and Pocklington

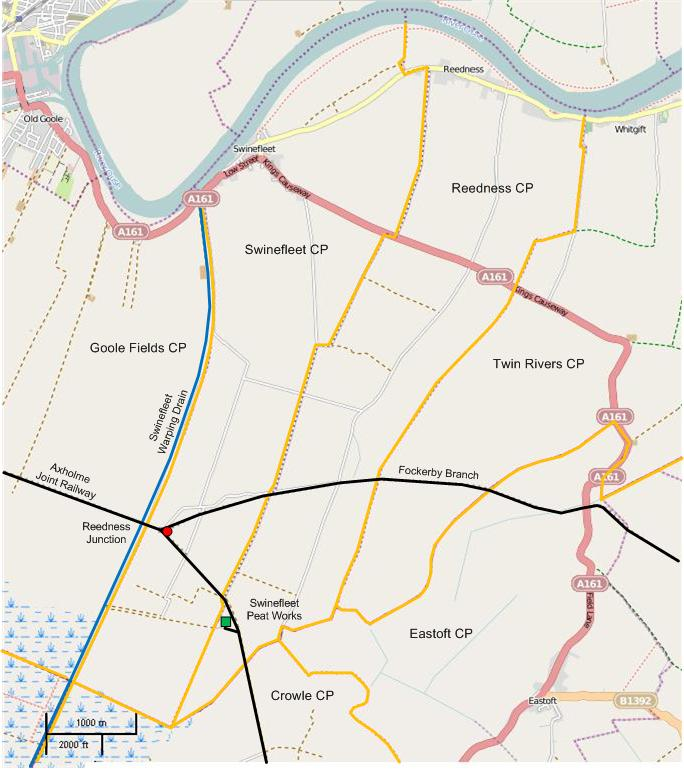
Map showing the boundary of the parish and historical features including the Axholme Joint Railway and Swinefleet Peat Works

Swinefleet is a village and civil parish in the East Riding of Yorkshire, England. It is situated approximately 2 miles (3.2 km) south-east of the town of Goole on the A161 road from Goole to Crowle. It lies on the south bank of the River Ouse. According to the 2011 UK census, Swinefleet parish had a population of 787, an increase on the 2001 UK census figure of 748. The main centre of population is at the extreme north of the parish, close to the River Ouse. The southern part of the parish is part of Swinefleet and Reedness Moors, and is characterised by drainage ditches and a few farm buildings.

A local bus company, known as Sweyne Coaches is based in Swinefleet. They used to run public services between Scunthorpe and Goole but still do school services for Goole High School and the Holy Family Catholic High School in Carlton, and private hire services. The public services have been taken over by East Yorkshire Motor Service in 2015. It is also home to the Swinefleet Peat Works, which is now derelict.

== Geography ==
The civil parish of Swinefleet is bordered to the north by the River Ouse. Its western edge follows the course of the Swinefleet Warping Drain, beyond which is the civil parish of Goole Fields. To the east is Reedness. The county border with North Lincolnshire runs along the southern edge of the parish, where it is bordered by Crowle.

== History ==
Swinefleet was previously a civil parish that was part of the Goole Rural District in the West Riding of Yorkshire from 1894 to 1974, then in Boothferry district of Humberside until 1996.

The western boundary of the parish is formed by Swinefleet Warping Drain. This was authorised by an Act of Parliament obtained by Ralph Creyke, and parts of it were completed by 1821. Warping was a process by which silt-rich river water was allowed to flood land which was of poor quality. The silt would be deposited on the surface, and over a period of time, would build up to create soils which could support agriculture. Creyke later worked with T H S Sotheron and the two men succeeded in improving a large area of land over the next 40 years. It was the most successful of several plans to improve Thorne and Hatfield Moors by warping, as Makin Durham succeeded in creating Durham's Warping Drain to the west of the moors, but failed to reclaim much land, and the Thorne Moor Improvement Company's scheme failed when the Great Northern Railway Company abandoned their planned line from Gainsborough to Doncaster via Thorne, which would have enabled agricultural produce from the reclaimed land to be taken to market.

=== Peat milling ===
Near the southern edge of the parish, about 3 miles (4.8 km) south of the population centre, was Swinefleet Peat Works. The first mill at this location was established by Bennett's Moss Peat Company in 1886, and was called Marshland Works. Bennett's employed 40 men to harvest the peat, which was removed from the moors in wagons pulled by horses, and taken to the mill, where it was milled and bagged into bales. Foster Wilson was employed to transport the bales by horse and dray to Swinefleet Clough, where there was a wharf on the River Ouse. Bennett's then built a 3 ft 7 in (1,093 mm) gauge tramway, which ran from the mill to the Swinefleet Warping Drain, and then along the eastern bank of the drain to the Clough. Facilities at the Clough included an unloading shed, a warehouse and several other buildings. Most of the bales were exported by barge from the wharf, but some of the peat was sold locally, being delivered by horse and dray.

The steam locomotive which worked on the tramway was built by Webster, Jackson and Co. who were based in Goole. The Goole Times newspaper carried a report on 7 June 1895 of a visit to the line by the Yorkshire Naturalists' Union. It commented that the visitors had been transported to the works on flat wagons, with their legs dangling over the sides, and although the train reached their destination fairly quickly, several were somewhat shaken by the experience. Bennett's became bankrupt in 1891, although they continued to trade until they were taken over by the Goole Moss Litter Company in 1893. The new company became part of the British Peat Moss Litter Company in 1896, an amalgamation of most of the peat companies working on Thorne and Hatfield Moors.

It is not known exactly when the tramway ceased to operate, but the Axholme Joint Railway, which crossed the parish, would have required a level crossing with it, and the North Eastern Railway, one of the promoters, met with the British Peat Moss Litter Company to offer compensation if they would waive their rights to a level crossing. The Axholme Joint Railway opened in 1903, and included a siding which served Swinefleet Peat Works. The tramway locomotive was offered for sale in 1901, but is thought to have been scrapped on site, as no purchaser was found. The works was connected to the moors by a network of 3 ft (914 mm) gauge tramways, which were worked by horses until the 1950s and then by diesel locomotives. The mill was closed in July 2000, after 114 years of operation, although stockpiled peat continued to be removed from the moors until 2005, but was taken to Hatfield Works for processing.

=== Railways ===
Reedness Junction, where the Fockerby branch of the Axholme Joint Railway left the main line to Epworth, was situated within the parish, despite its name, while Swinefleet Peat Works was actually in the adjacent parish of Reedness, although the tramway to the moors passed through Swinefleet. The line to the west of Reedness Junction, and the Fockerby Branch, the northernmost line of the two to the east, were built by the Goole and Marshland Light Railway. The line to the south, which ran to Crowle North, Epworth and Haxey Junction was partially built by the Isle of Axholme Light Railway, but both were taken over by the Axholme Joint Railway in January 1903. The railway was opened for passengers on 10 August 1903, as far south as Crowle, with the final section being completed and opened in early 1905. Passenger services were withdrawn in 1933, and the railway was closed in 1965.

The railway company held a heated debate in 1906, when Colonel Thompson requested permission for a group of about 16 female potato pickers to be allowed to walk through Reedness Goods Yard, and then cross over Swinefleet Warping Drain, on the western boundary of the parish, by walking along the main line of the railway. His request was to reduce the distance that the ladies had to walk to work each day, and was granted, although the Colonel had to indemnify the railway against claims if any of them were involved in an accident while following this route.

== See also ==
- Listed buildings in Swinefleet

== Bibliography ==
- Booth, Adrian (1998). The Peat Railways of Thorne and Hatfield Moors. Industrial Railway Society. ISBN 978-1-90155604-9.
- Judge, C.W. (1994). The Axholme Joint Railway. Oakwood Press. ISBN 978-0-85361-441-8.
- Limbert, Martin; Roworth, Peter C. (2009). "Mechanised Peat Winning and Transportation on Thorne Moors". THMCF Technical Report (2nd ed.). Thorne & Hatfield Moors Conservation Forum. ISSN 1468-2087.
- Gazetteer — A–Z of Towns Villages and Hamlets. East Riding of Yorkshire Council. 2006. p. 10.
