= Swinefleet Warping Drain =

Artificial waterway in the East Riding of Yorkshire, England

Coordinates: 53.6455°N 0.8593°W

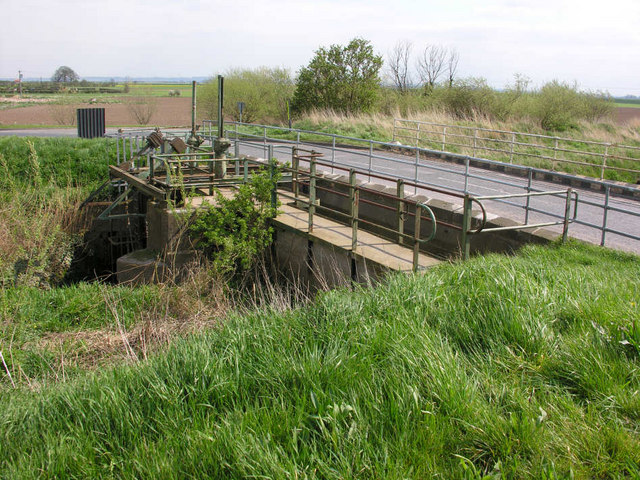
- The modern outlet sluice where the Drain enters the River Ouse

History
- Principal engineer: R Creyke
- Date of act: 1821

Swinefleet Warping Drain is an artificial waterway in the English county of the East Riding of Yorkshire, which was built to allow silt to be deposited on the peat moors, but now functions as a land drainage channel. It was constructed by Ralph Creyke, and the first section was completed in 1821.

== History ==
Ralph Creyke was a proponent of warping, a process where silt-laden water was allowed to flow over barren land, and to deposit the silt on its surface. He lived at Rawcliffe House in Goole, and was probably the first person in Yorkshire to carry out warping as a contract. His first contract was in 1812 for Francis Blackburne, where he agreed to warp 55 acres (22 ha) in Goole for a price of £1,165. His next known project was the warping of 225 acres (91 ha) in Sandhill for his client Josias Cockshutt Twisleton, while in April 1816 he obtained permission to warp 900 acres (360 ha) in Rawcliffe from the Court of Sewers. All three of these schemes used silt-laden water from the final section of the River Don, known as the Dutch River. His next major project was for "warping and otherwise improving certain moors, commons and wastes and other low grounds in the parishes of Whitgift and Snaith" and for this he obtained the Whitgift and Snaith Drainage Act 1820 (1 Geo. 4. c. lxiii). In order to achieve this, he constructed the Swinefleet Warping Drain southwards from the River Ouse to improve land on the edge of Thorne Moors for agriculture. The first section was completed in 1821, and allowed him to warp 430 acres (174 ha) of the moors. In recognition of his achievements, he was awarded a gold medal by the Society for Encouragement of the Arts in 1825.

Creyke, using his previous experience, constructed a sluice at Swinefleet Clough which was 30 feet (9.1 m) wide at the bottom and 90 feet (27 m) wide at the surface level of the land. It included two openings in the stonework, each 16 feet (4.9 m) wide, and four large pointing doors, which normally prevented the tide from entering, but could be held open by iron rods, to allow the tidal water to enter. Banks were constructed on either side of the main channel, and the drain initially ran for around 3 miles (4.8 km), with the project including land purchase and the building of the sluice costing £18,000. By 1825, 1,528 acres (618 ha) were being warped, on behalf of 30 landowners, who paid £15 per acre for Creyke's services. In a letter to the Society of Arts, Creyke explained that he worked on a bigger scale and at less cost than others who had preceded him. Hence the drain was 90 feet (27 m) wide, compared to the 12 feet (3.7 m) he had previously used, the sluice was over three times wider, and he was thus able to warp 500 acres (200 ha) at a time, rather than 14 acres (5.7 ha). He also warped the land throughout the year, rather than just in the summer months.

Creyke died in 1828, but his son, also known as Ralph Creyke, inherited the drain and continued the family warping business. By 1845, some 2,000 acres (810 ha) of land towards Fockerby Common were being warped, facilitated by an extension of the Swinefleet Warping Drain by 4.7 miles (7.6 km) to the east, a section now known as Red House Drain. The younger Creyke was subsequently involved in a large scheme to warp 1,000 acres (400 ha) of Thorne Moors, working with T H S Sotheron, for which they obtained the Thorne Moor Drainage and Improvement Act 1848 (11 & 12 Vict. c. cl), but the project was beset by legal delays, and work never commenced. Creyke continued to work with Sotheron's descendants until 1878, when he sold the warping business to Makin Durham, who was another great exponent of warping. He had built Durham's Warping Drain eastwards from the River Don in 1856, extended it further eastwards prior to 1881, and then built a southern extension to the site that later became Thorne Colliery.

Around 1875, Durham formed the Yorkshire Land and Warping Company, which had its registered office at Thorne from then until 1947, when the company was wound up. Swinefleet Warping Drain was part of the assets of that company, either from 1878, or maybe from 1904. Makin died at the beginning of 1882 at the age of 77 yrs. Gradually, the value of the moors as a source of peat for commercial exploitation became more important than their potential for agriculture, and attempts to create agricultural land dwindled. Around 1900, Swinefleet Warping Drain was extended southwards, giving it a total length of around 5.6 miles (9 km) The drain was used for warping land near Medge Hall, Crowle just before the start of the First World War, and was last used for this purpose in 1934.

=== Drainage ===
Swinefleet has long been prone to flooding, due to the low-lying nature of the land, and in 1793, the Whitgift, Yorkshire (Drainage) Act 1793 (33 Geo. 3. c. 108) was obtained to allow land within the parishes of Swinefleet and Reedness to be enclosed, and some drainage work to be carried out. Another act, the Reedness and Swinefleet Drainage Act 1884 (47 & 48 Vict. c. clxxxvii), created the Reedness and Swinefleet Drainage Commissioners, who managed land drainage in the area until the board was reconstituted in 1990, under the provisions of the Land Drainage Act 1976 (1976 c. 70). The Reedness and Swinefleet Internal Drainage Board manage 41 miles (66 km) of drainage ditches and have one pumping station. Most of the watercourses within their jurisdiction are man-made, and this includes that part of Swinefleet Warping Drain which is north of the county border at Blackwater Dyke. In 2019, they were considering building one or two ramps, to allow a weed-cutting boat to be used on the drain; modifications to their pumping station so that it would comply with regulations on the passage of eels along waterways; and the possibility of constructing a pumping station at the outlet of the drain, at an estimated cost of £2.5 million. A ramp was built in March 2019, and trails with a weed-cutting boat were successful.

Immediately to the west of Swinefleet Warping Drain, Goole Fields District Drainage Board (DDB) manage the drainage of 2,641 acres (1,069 ha) of land, where they maintain 9.48 miles (15.26 km) of drains and have one pumping station. Some of the excess water from their area enters the River Ouse through a sluice at the end of Shipcote Drain, just to the west of the Warping Drain outlet, but water is also pumped from Goole Fields Cross Drain into the Warping Drain by a pumping station. The pumping station outputs between 13 Ml per day and an agreed maximum of 22 Ml per day. Since the cessation of peat extraction on the moors, large areas form the Thorne, Crowle and Goole Moors Site of Special Scientific Interest (SSSI). In order to aid the recovery of the peat moors, water levels are held significantly higher than they had been when peat extraction was taking place, and English Nature also use pumping in an attempt to maintain constant water levels.

Construction of their current pumping station on Blackwater Dike commenced in late 2016, and included the installation and commissioning of a permanent Archimedes' screw pump to ensure that water levels in the peat bog are kept at an optimum level for peat regeneration. The work was commissioned by the Doncaster East Internal Drainage Board, and the principal contractor for the works was North Midland Construction PLC. The installation includes a tilting weir, which controls water levels for much of the time, but when the pump is required, it is powered by an off-grid generator, controlled by a telemetry system which uses wind and solar power. The installation was the first in the United Kingdom to use a new design of screw pump, enclosed in a vinyl ester pipe, which greatly improves its efficiency, and allows fish to travel through it without harm.

The new pump is powered by electricity, derived from a battery pack which is charged by a wind generator and solar cells, with an auxiliary diesel generator which can be used if necessary. The amount of water that English Nature can pump into the Warping Drain is restricted by the need to maintain the gravity outfall from Black Dyke and Reedness village, while in 2019 the new pump was out of action for several months, resulting in the old one having to be used. Goole Fields DDB consider that water flowing out of the SSSI as a result of the new regime threatens properties in the parish of Goole Fields.

== Route ==
Swinefleet Warping Drain begins at Swinefleet Clough, an indentation in the right bank of the River Ouse, on the border between the parishes of Swinefleet and Goole Fields. Creyke's historic sluice with pointing doors has been replaced by a modern concrete construction with a flapped outlet. The sluice is situated on the north side of the A161 road, which is named Goole Road to the east and Swinefleet Road to the west. The drain is actually in Goole Fields, since the parish boundary runs along Quay Road, which runs parallel to the drain on its east bank. The safety of the A161 bridge was raised in Parliament in 1939, when Mr Adam Hills MP for Pontefract stated that both it and the bridge over Earnshaw's Warping Drain to the west were unsafe, and that Goole Urban District Council had been in conversation with the West Riding of Yorkshire County Council for ten years, but had failed to reach an agreement. Captain Hudson, speaking for the government, replied that the road was scheduled to be widened, and that plans for new bridges would be available within six months. Maps from around 1906 show a sluice around 150 yards (140 m) to the south of the road bridge, as well as one beneath the bridge.

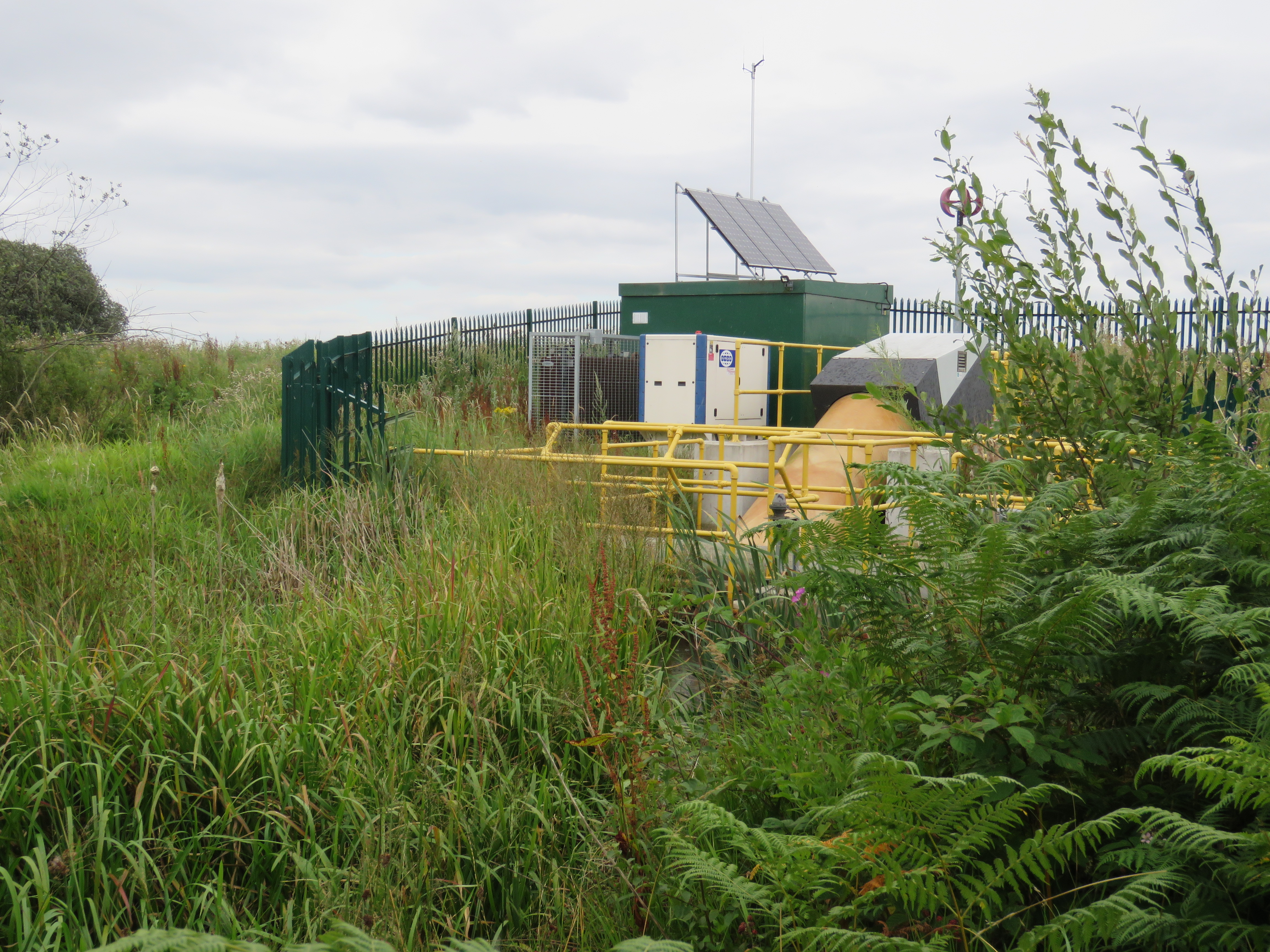
The English Nature Pumping Station on Blackwater Dike maintains water levels in the Humberhead Peatlands Nature Reserve by pumping into Swinefleet Warping Drain.

Most of the drain is in open countryside, with the only habitation nearby consisting of farm houses. The first is Field House Farm, on the left bank, where the farmhouse dates from the late 18th century, with 19th century additions at the rear. The grade II listed building is made of brown brick with a Welsh slate roof, and has two storeys with an attic. Continuing to the south, Quay Road leaves the side of the drain, but the parish boundary remains on the right bank. The drain turns to a south-south-easterly direction, to be joined on its left bank by Goosefields Cross Drain. This was the location at which the Axholme Joint Railway crossed the drain, to reach Reedness Junction railway station on the right bank. Here the line to Fockerby turned off from the line to Haxey Junction. The railway was carried over the drain by a steel girder bridge, 120 feet (37 m) in length, which was the subject of an unusual request by Colonel Thompson in 1906. He asked the railway to allow a group of about 16 female potato pickers to walk through the goods yard and over the bridge, as it was the only crossing of the drain in the vicinity, and would save the ladies from having to walk a considerable distance to reach the fields. A heated Board meeting followed, but permission was given, although the Colonel had to indemnify the railway should an accident occur in which the ladies were involved. Passenger services on the railway ceased in 1933, but it remained open for goods traffic until 1965. However, the rails and bridge over the drain were retained until 1972, as the section of line between Ealand and Belton was used occasionally by the Central Electricity Generating Board to move stators from Keadby Power Station across the Stainforth and Keadby Canal, until the road bridge over the canal was replaced with something more substantial.

The next farm building by the drain is at Swinefleet Moor Farm, where in 1890 the drain turned to the east towards Swinefleet Peat Works and Fockerby Common. By 1906, the drain continued southwards, but the section towards the peat works was still labelled Swinefleet Warping Drain. By that time a 3 ft (914 mm)-gauge railway ran parallel to the drain from the peat works, which crossed the main drain and turned southwards to run alongside the newly constructed drain. The tramway bridge is still in situ, with its rails embedded in the surface. At Blackwater Dike, which runs at right angles to the Drain on both banks, it leaves East Yorkshire and enters North Lincolnshire, as the boundary follows the Dike. In 1906, the final section of the drain was still under construction, as far as Thousand Acre Drain. Beyond that point, there is a network of drains, all of which are considerably narrower than Swinefleet Warping Drain, so it is probable that it officially ends in this location. In 1966, the one that carries straight onwards was called Swinefleet Line Drain, and those that ran to Medge Hall were simply labelled "Drain".

== Earnshaw's Warping Drain ==
The reach of the River Ouse near the outflow of the Swinefleet Warping Drain heads in a south-westerly direction travelling upstream, and then makes a right-angle turn to the north-west. On this next reach is the outflow of Earnshaw's Warping Drain. This was cut in the 1800s by a local farmer called George Rawden Earnshaw, who lived at Manor Cottage in Old Goole. His daughter Ann married William Eden Cass in 1834, the new town of Goole's first medical practitioner. A bridge carries the A161 road over the drain, with a sluice next to the road. Both are grade II listed, although only the south-western face of the bridge is visible, the rest being obscured by later earth infill, from when the road was widened. The sluice was constructed of tooled ashlar, with a wooden gate and an iron mechanism to raise or lower the gate. It was one of only two sluices in the area which retained their original hoist mechanism, the other being on the Folly Drain at Keadby, and was the most complete example when it was listed in 1987, but by 2003 the hoist mechanism had been removed.

Nearby on the right bank is Goole Hall, a grade II* listed house built in 1820 for Jarvis Empson, and largely unaltered until 1985–86. The drain heads in a south-south-westerly direction, passing Goole Grange, where it makes two right angle turns towards the west, and continues in the same general direction. On the edge of Goole Moors, it connects with a number of other drains that carry water from the moors.

== Water quality ==
The Environment Agency measure water quality of the river systems in England. Each is given an overall ecological status, which may be one of five levels: high, good, moderate, poor and bad. There are several components that are used to determine this, including biological status, which looks at the quantity and varieties of invertebrates, angiosperms and fish. Chemical status compares the concentrations of various chemicals against known safe concentrations and is rated good or fail.

The water quality for the Earnshaw's Warping Drain was as follows in 2019. Prior to 2019, the data was labelled as if it was for Swinefleet Warping Drain, but querying it with the Environment Agency led them to correct the location.

Section	Ecological Status	Chemical Status	Length	Catchment	Channel
Earnshaw's Warping Drain	Moderate	Fail	2.9 miles (4.7 km)	7.99 square miles (20.7 km^{2})	artificial

The main reasons for the water quality being less than good are physical modification of the channel and the leaching of nutrients into the water from agricultural land. Like many rivers in the UK, the chemical status changed from good to fail in 2019, due to the presence of polybrominated diphenyl ethers (PBDE) and mercury compounds, neither of which had previously been included in the assessment.

Limited quality data is obtained for Swinefleet Warping Drain by a monitoring station located just above the confluence with the River Ouse. For 2019, this shows that quality was high for ammonia, dissolved oxygen, and temperature, with phosphate levels being moderate.

== Bibliography ==
- Booth, Adrian (1998). The Peat Railways of Thorne and Hatfield Moors. Industrial Railway Society. ISBN 978-1-901556-04-9.
- Butler, Amy; Butler, Susan (2014). "Goole's First Doctor: William Eden Cass". Howdenshire History. Archived from the original on 16 April 2015.
- Byford, Daniel (2005). "Agricultural change in the lowlands of South Yorkshire with special reference to the manor of Hatfield 1600-c.1875" (PDF). PhD thesis. University of Sheffield. Archived (PDF) from the original on 12 March 2020.
- Cory, Vernon (1985). Hatfield and Axholme – An Historical Review. Providence Press. ISBN 978-0-903803-15-1.
- Hargreaves, David (Winter 2017). "LIFE update" (PDF). Moor Space. Humberhead Peatlands. Archived (PDF) from the original on 16 July 2020.
- Judge, C.W. (1994). The Axholme Joint Railway. Oakwood Press. ISBN 978-0-85361-441-8.
- Lawton, George (1842). Collections relative to churches and chapels within the diocese of York. J G & F Rivington. Archived from the original on 31 July 2020.
- Limbert, Martin (1990). The Drainage of Thorne Waste in the Nineteenth Century (PDF). Thorne Local History Society. Archived (PDF) from the original on 17 April 2016.
- Limbert, Martin (2012). "Peat exploitation on Thorne Moors" (PDF). Thesis. University of Bradford. Archived (PDF) from the original on 31 July 2020.
- Murray, John (1845). The Journal of the Royal Agricultural Society of England. Vol. 5. Royal Agricultural Society.
- O'Driscoll, Mrs (7 January 2019a). "Minutes of the Full Board Meeting" (PDF). Reedness and Swinefleet IDB. Archived (PDF) from the original on 2 August 2020.
- O'Driscoll, Mrs (13 May 2019b). "Minutes of the Full Board Meeting" (PDF). Reedness and Swinefleet IDB. Archived (PDF) from the original on 15 March 2025.

== External sources ==
Media related to Swinefleet Warping Drain at Wikimedia Commons
