= Reedness =

Village and civil parish in the East Riding of Yorkshire, England

Coordinates: 53.697537°N 0.795982°W

- Location within the East Riding of Yorkshire
- Population: 339 (2011 census)
- OS grid reference: SE795230
- Civil parish: Reedness
- Unitary authority: East Riding of Yorkshire
- Ceremonial county: East Riding of Yorkshire
- Region: Yorkshire and the Humber
- Country: England
- Sovereign state: United Kingdom
- Post town: GOOLE
- Postcode district: DN14
- Dialling code: 01405
- Police: Humberside
- Fire: Humberside
- Ambulance: Yorkshire
- UK Parliament: Goole and Pocklington

Reedness is a village and civil parish in the East Riding of Yorkshire, England. It is situated approximately 3 miles (4.8 km) east of the town of Goole and lies on the south bank of the River Ouse.

The civil parish is formed by the village of Reedness and the hamlet of Little Reedness. According to the 2011 UK census, Reedness parish had a population of 339, a decrease on the 2001 UK census figure of 355.

The parish was part of the Goole Rural District in the West Riding of Yorkshire from 1894 to 1974, then in Boothferry district of Humberside until 1996.

The name Reedness derives from the Old English hrēodnæss meaning 'reed ness (promontory)'.

== Buildings ==
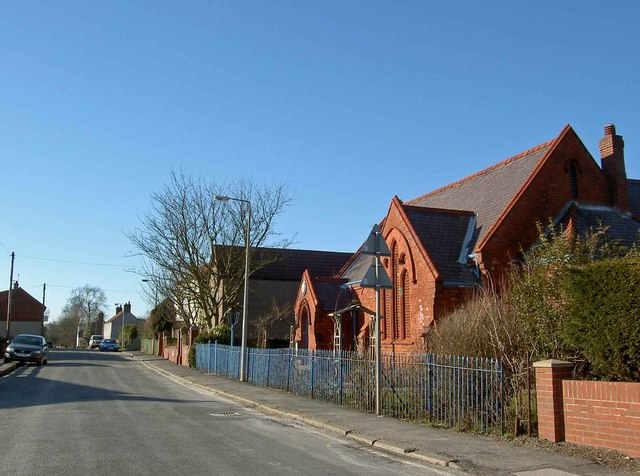
Wesleyan Methodist Chapel

The main street is occupied by several grade II listed buildings, dating back to the eighteenth century. The oldest is the Old Manor, originally an L-shaped building dating from the early part of the century, but the rear wing was demolished in the 1950s. It is constructed of brick, some of which is rendered, with a pantile roof. Elmtree House if a pebbledashed brick structure, with a slate roof, dating from the middle of the century. Reedness Manor House is also brick with a slate roof, but the front was replaced in the nineteenth century, and is pebbledashed, while Reedness Hall is built in plain brick, with a slate roof at the front and pantiles at the back. Both data from mid-century. The Ferry House (was Ferry Inn/Angel Inn) on the junction with Church Lane, is the only one which carries a date. Tie-bar ends on the gables indicate that it was built in 1778, although there have been later additions to the red-brick, pantile-roofed building.

== Geography ==
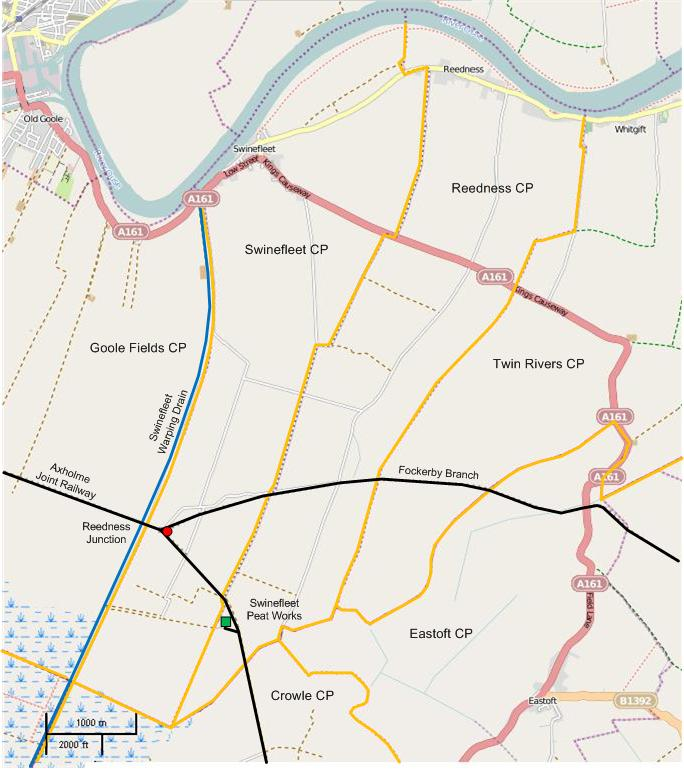
Map showing the parish boundary and the location of Reedness Junction and Swinefleet Peat Works

The centre of population is located on an unclassified road which runs along the southern bank of the River Ouse from Swinefleet to the west, and through Whitgift and Ousefleet to the east, before turning south to reach Adlingfleet, Fockerby and Garthorpe. Whitgift, Ousefleet and Adlingfleet are all part of the civil parish of Twin Rivers. Through Little Reedness, the road is very close to the flood bank of the river, and development is restricted to the southern side of the road. The parish stretches southwards towards Swinefleet and Reedness Moor, and this area is sparsely populated, with just a few farms and large numbers of drainage ditches. The southern boundary of the parish borders the parishes of Eastoft and Crowle.

To the south of the population centre, the A161 road cuts across the parish in a straight line. It is called the King's Causeway, and is flanked by counter drains on both sides. Further south, the Fockerby Branch of the Axholme Joint Railway crossed the parish, on its way from Reedness Junction to Fockerby. The railway opened in stages between 1903 and 1905, was closed to passengers in 1933, and closed completely in 1965. At the extreme southern edge of the parish, the main line of the Axholme Joint Railway to Epworth also passed through the parish. There was a siding which served Swinefleet Peat Works, to which 3 ft (914 mm) gauge tramways brought peat from Thorne Moors for processing and despatch via the railway. Despite their names, Swinefleet Peat Works was in Reedness, while Reedness Junction and its railway station, where the Fockerby Branch diverged from the line to Epworth, was in the parish of Swinefleet.

== Notable residents ==
- John de Rednesse, Lord Chief Justice of Ireland, was born here c.1300.
