= Crowle, Lincolnshire =

Town in North Lincolnshire, England

Coordinates: 53.607350°N 0.832108°W

Crowle
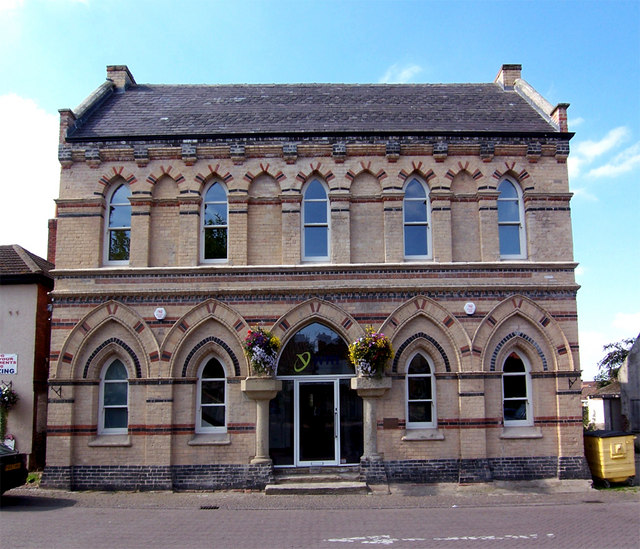
- Market Hall in Crowle

- Location within Lincolnshire
- Area: 1.445 km^{2} (0.558 sq mi)
- Population: 4,006 (2024 estimate)
  - Density: 2,772/km^{2} (7,180/sq mi)
- OS grid reference: SE772128
  - London: 150 mi (240 km) SSE
- Civil parish: Crowle and Ealand
- Unitary authority: North Lincolnshire
- Ceremonial county: Lincolnshire
- Region: Yorkshire and the Humber
- Country: England
- Sovereign state: United Kingdom
- Post town: Scunthorpe
- Postcode district: DN17
- Police: Humberside
- Fire: Humberside
- Ambulance: East Midlands
- UK Parliament: Doncaster East and the Isle of Axholme

Crowle is a market town in the civil parish of Crowle and Ealand, on the Isle of Axholme in the North Lincolnshire unitary authority of Lincolnshire, England. In 2024 it had an estimated population of 4006. The town lies on the Stainforth and Keadby Canal.

Notable buildings in the town include the parish church, in which can be seen the Crowle Stone runic cross shaft, and the Gothic Revival market hall.

== History ==
Crowle is situated on one of a series of hills which form the Isle of Axholme, left exposed when the area emerged from the Glacial Lake Humber after the last Ice Age, and is separated from the main raised area to the south by a low-lying strip of land. The Isle of Axholme was formerly surrounded by several rivers, and much of the low-lying marshland was regularly inundated by water. The River Don flowed in a north-easterly direction just to the west of Crowle, to join the River Trent at Adlingfleet, but the hydrology of the area was radically altered in the seventeenth century, when Cornelius Vermuyden was appointed by Charles I to drain Hatfield Chase. Major rivers were diverted, and the numerous canals and drainage ditches that cross the fields give the whole area a Dutch character.

Archaeological evidence for early settlement suggests that there were occupation sites scattered throughout the area, rather than a village or town. There is evidence of Neolithic settlers in the form of stone axes and arrowheads, as well as the waste left by tool-making. Shards of Early Bronze Age pottery have been found, and in 1747, a hoard of spearheads and bronze rapiers were found on Crowle Moor, suggesting that settlement continued through the third, second and first millennia BCE. It continued through the Romano-British period, with finds in the parish suggesting a number of farmsteads, similar to those found in excavations at nearby Sandtoft during the construction of the M180 motorway. The grouping together of individual settlements to form a community probably took place in the Anglo-Saxon period.

The top of Mill Hill was used for arable farming from at least Roman times onwards. Field walking conducted between 2002 and 2004 on the east side of Mill Hill suggests that the arable farming was conducted down towards the 5 m contour. Below this point, the land was too damp and used for pasture. Below about 4 m, very little pottery was found. The land was too difficult to work until the invention of the tractor. The town had thirty-one fisheries recorded in the Domesday Book of the late 11th century. The Domesday Book recorded: "Manor in Crule, Alwin had one oxgang less than six carucates to be taxed. Land to as many ploughs. Inland at Hubaldstorp. Now, a certain Abbot of St. Germains in Selby has there under Geoffrey, one plough in the demesne, and fifteen villanes and nineteen bordars, having seven ploughs, and thirty-one fisheries of thirty-one shillings. Thirty acres of meadow. There is a church, and wood and pasture one mile long and one mile broad. Value in King Edward's time £12, now £8. Tallaged at 40s." At the Conquest of 1066, Crowle was the most populous and valuable manor in the Isle of Axholme. The Lord Paramount Geoffrey de Wirce, kept a demesne (Area of land) in his own hands. A carucate, approximately 240 acres, is the amount of land that can be worked by a plough team in a year. There are eight oxen in a plough team, hence the oxgang is 30 acres.

The parish church building, dedicated to St Oswald, was built soon afterwards, with Norman architecture dating from the twelfth century evident in the south and west walls of the nave and the north wall of the chancel. Some earlier Saxon material was reused, including a decorated cross shaft, now in the west bay of the nave arcade. The decoration includes serpents, two flying dragons, two figures in conversation, a third figure on horseback, and a runic inscription. The building was modified and partially rebuilt in subsequent centuries, including a major restoration in 1884 by A S Ellis of London, and is now a Grade I listed structure, in recognition of its architectural merit. Crowle developed into a market town in the twelfth and thirteenth centuries, with the support of the Abbot of Selby, and its first market charter was awarded in 1305.

The economy was agricultural, and included hunting and fishing. The surrounding peat fens was grazed intensively during the summer months, and Crowle common was managed by four grass-men, who controlled the grazing and charged those who brought stock to the common from other areas. During the winter, the stock was kept on higher ground or in yards, as much of the grassland was flooded between November and May. This had a beneficial effect, as water-borne alluvium improved the fertility of the soil. The flooded areas also supported fishing and fowling.

=== Drainage ===
Some improvements had been made to the water systems of the area by Selby Abbey, both for drainage and for navigation, but the effects of the drainage of Hatfield Chase by Vermuyden in the 1620s were much more significant. The scheme attempted to turn a productive marsh-based peasant economy into an arable system, but the way in which it was financed resulted in much of the reclaimed land being owned by Vermuyden and his adventurers, the Crown, or existing landowners. Many local people lost their livelihoods, as the common land was reduced from between 3,000 and 4,000 acres (1,200 and 1,600 ha) to just 1,814 acres (734 ha). Although reclaimed arable land was offered back to local people for rent, they were stock farmers, and the meadow land and winter fodder were gone. There was widespread unrest throughout the area, particularly as the initial drainage was less than effective, resulting in flooding in both summer and winter, without the benefits of fertilising the soil. Winter fowling and fishing activity was reduced, although 100 acres (40 ha) of land were eventually awarded to the people of Crowle in compensation for the loss of fisheries. Parts of Crowle were leased to Vermuyden in 1636 by Charles I, based on the original contract under which he got to own one third of the improved lands, but making a profit from the land holdings proved to be very difficult, and he quickly sold the land to the Earl of Pembroke and Montgomery and to Sir Richard Pye.

Between 1590 and 1640, forty new houses were built in the town, and this prosperity continued through the 17th and 18th centuries. It was supported by farming and fishing, by the cutting of peat on the moors, by the cultivation of flax and hemp, and by the production of sackcloth. Transport links were improved by the construction of the Stainforth and Keadby Canal between 1792 and 1802, which passed just to the south of Crowle, providing better access to the River Don and the River Trent. Warping of land became popular in the late 18th century, a process by which agricultural land was flooded by tidal water in a controlled way, so that the sediments it contained, known as warp, were deposited as the tide receded. If the system was well designed, some 2,300 tons per acre (5,800 tonnes per ha) could be deposited over the course of a year, creating new soil to a depth of 1.5 feet (46 cm). An inclosure act was obtained for Crowle in 1785, which specified that the enclosed land should be warped in this way. Crowle Manor was enclosed in 1813, and 200 acres (81 ha) were warped, at a cost of £25 per acre (£61.78/ha), which was relatively costly.

=== Development ===
Crowle, together with the whole of the north Isle of Axholme, thrived in the 19th century. The production of sackcloth was improved by mechanisation, and there was a growth in milling, brewing and agricultural engineering. Other employment was available in a brick and tile works, located to the south of the town centre. The 1893 map shows four windmills in Crowle, one on Godnow Road and three on Mill Road. The growing of hemp in the district had ceased by 1839, to be replaced by flax. Crowle had a mill for processing the flax, which lasted until the early 20th century. It was located to the north of Chancery Lane. Some indication of the prosperity of the town in the late 19th century can be gained from the Market Hall (designed by William Hull) with its elaborate decoration. Crowle was one of the first in the area to have a gas works, which started producing gas in 1854. It was located on the corner of Cross Street and Windsor Road, and had a working capital of £1,800, raised by issuing £10 shares. The gas was used for street lighting. In 1905 there were two breweries in operation, James Fox & Sons operating the one to the north of the town and John Dymond owning the New Trent Brewery.

During this period, the population increased steadily, from 1,343 in 1801 to 1,889 in 1831, 2,548 in 1851 and 3,122 in 1871. A Burial Board was created in 1862, and established a general cemetery on a long plot on Mill Lane, with two mortuary chapels. One of them is now used to store equipment for the maintenance of the cemetery. Education in 1872 was provided by a National School. The parish had been bequeathed three houses, which included common rights and 10 acres (4.0 ha) of land, to be used for the education and relief of the poor. The houses were given by Richard Brewer in 1687, Thomas Walkwood in 1692 and Richard Clark in 1721. When the inclosure act was obtained, the land and common rights were consolidated, and the trustees received a little over 21 acres (8.5 ha) of tithe-free land and £206, which was used to repair the houses. They were then rented out, and the Charity Commissioners later appropriated the income to fund the National School. Education was managed by a School Board from 1871. White's Guide of 1872 includes a list of those engaged in trades and professions, and besides the National School, it lists nine other people under the Academies and Schools section, three of whom took in boarders. Farming was still a major occupation, as that section is much bigger than all the others, but a wide range of occupations are listed, some of which were pursued by women, including a Mrs Ann Bleasby, who was a blacksmith. Opportunities for paid work for the working classes were available at the Flax Mill, but the chief source of employment in 1894 was the harvesting of peat for the Peat Moss Litter Works.

Trade was further enhanced by the arrival of the railways. The Axholme Joint Railway opened on 2 January 1905, linking Crowle to Goole in the north and Haxey Junction in the south, where there was an interchange with the Great Northern and Great Eastern Joint Railway. A major feature of the railway was Crowle Swing Bridge, which carried it over the Stainforth and Keadby Canal. Construction involved moving 200,000 cubic yards (150,000 m^{3}) of earth to form the embankments on either side of the main span. The opening section of the bridge was built by the Cleveland Bridge & Engineering Company, who were based in Darlington. The northern approach, on the Crowle side of the canal, included three brick arches, crossing a minor road and a drainage ditch, a 52-foot (16 m) girder bridge which carried the line over the Scunthorpe to Doncaster line of the Great Central Railway, and a further brick arch.

In the mid twentieth century, the economy of Crowle declined somewhat, as there was a decline in agriculture, and the transport links which had once contributed to its success took trade away from it. Despite this, there was an expansion in the number of houses, with residential developments on Mill Hill, Wharf Road, Field Side and Godnow Road, and the construction of the M180 motorway, which skirts the southern edge of the town, provided quick access to major centres of employment and shopping.

On 12 May 2010 the civil parish was renamed from "Crowle" to "Crowle & Ealand".

== Schools ==
The Axholme Academy is the main secondary school serving the town. Before 2012, when it became an academy, it was known as North Axholme School. In 1965, the school organised a historic trip along the Axholme Joint Railway, on which passenger services had been withdrawn in 1933. On 1 April, just 4 days before the railway finally closed, they hired a 4-coach diesel multiple unit, which ran from Goole, via Reedness Junction to Fockerby, and then back to Reedness Junction to reach Epworth. 184 pupils, with teachers and invited guests were joined by newspaper reporters and television cameramen for the trip. On the return journey, the train stopped at Ealand Siding and at Crowle for the passengers to get off. The whole journey took 4 hours, at an average speed of 8.1 miles per hour (13.0 km/h) and an account of the trip, written by Mr B J Hastings, the geography teacher, was published in the Lincolnshire Transport Review. The academy had 29 teachers in 2015, and catered for 400 pupils aged 11 to 18. Primary education is available at Crowle Primary Academy, with 10 teachers and 264 pupils, and at the denominational Saint Norbert's Catholic Primary Voluntary Academy, which has five teachers and 120 pupils.

== Religion ==
Crowle had several churches in addition to the parish church of St Oswald. These include a Catholic church, dedicated to St Norbert, and non-conformist chapels belonging to the Baptists, Methodists, Primitive Methodists and Congregationalists. The Baptists were active in the town from 1599, and built a chapel at the junction of Eastoft Road and Fieldside in 1820. The original building was demolished in 1879, and a new one built in its place. Due to dwindling congregations, the chapel closed in July 2010, and was sold at auction in March 2011. The site includes a small graveyard, and covenants were put in place to ensure that relatives of those buried could still visit the graves. The Congregationalists built a chapel on the west side of Fieldside in 1880, which has since been converted as a furniture salesroom. The Methodist chapel is on the east side of Fieldside, and the present building dates from 1904. The Sunday School, built in 1888 on the west side of the road, has been converted into a residence. The Primitive Methodists built a chapel on Chapel Street in 1830, and in 1862 moved to a new building on Cross Street. Following closure in 1965, the building was used by various businesses, and was subsequently converted into five town houses.

During the mid-19th century, there was an influx of Irish labourers, and there was nowhere locally for them to receive Mass. The foreman at the gas works, an Italian called Girolamo Vaccari, who changed his name to James Walker, asked Thomas Young of Kingerby Hall, near Market Rasen for help to establish a Catholic community, but the Diocese felt that a new parish in such a remote area would not be viable. Young therefore invited the Canons Regular of Prémontré, a religious order founded by St Norbert, and then based in Antwerp, to live and work in Crowle. A church and an attached house in which the Canons lived was designed by M E Hadfield & Son, who were based in Sheffield, built by George Sinclair, and paid for by Young. Work commenced in 1871, and the building was opened in 1872. A school was built in 1873, and both the church and the house were extended in 1874. A belfry, designed by the Clerk of Works at Lincoln Cathedral, was added in 1949. The canons later came from Tongerlo Abbey in Belgium, and the house ceased to be a priory in 1983.

== Facilities ==
There are several community facilities including a Library, a Community Resource Centre, a Youth Centre, a Hall, and a British Legion Club. In 2015, North Lincolnshire Council bought the Market Hall, and converted it, so that it could be used by the youth service. The Youth Club moved there from their former base on Church Lane, which allowed the Boxing Club to expand its activities.

There are a number of retail shops in the town centre, although the economic downturn had resulted in there being several unoccupied shops in 2004. There are also several public houses on the High Street and Market Place. The White Hart Inn is a timber-framed, grade II listed building dating from the 16th and 17th centuries, which was subsequently encased and rebuilt in brick, and roughly rendered. An ability to inspect the timbers during building work in the 1980s suggested that it includes two adjoining timber-framed houses. It advertises itself as the oldest inn in the Isle of Axholme. The Cross Keys Inn is another grade II listed building, dating from the 18th century and rebuilt in 1832. A stone tablet built into a former carriage opening records this fact, and the structure includes a number of 16-pane and unusual 9-pane sash windows. By 2015 it had become a training centre. The other open pub is the Red Lion

== Sport ==
The town has a local football team - Crowle Colts. The club was established in 1992, and currently competes in the Northern Counties East Football League. They play their games at Windsor Park on Godnow Road. It is also home to Crowle Keys, who play in the Scunthorpe & District Sunday League.

The town also has a local cricket team - Outcasts Cricket Club, that play their cricket at Hirst Priory Park on the outskirts of Crowle and play in the Lincolnshire County Cricket League. Previously there was a cricket club in the centre of Crowle called Crowle Sports (Previously Sun Engineers). The Crowle Sports side merged with Outcasts in 1987.

== Media ==
Television signals are received from either the Emley Moor or Belmont TV transmitters. Local radio stations are BBC Radio Humberside, Capital Yorkshire, Nation Radio East Yorkshire, Greatest Hits Radio Yorkshire, TX1 Radio, Hits Radio Lincolnshire, Hits Radio East Yorkshire & North Lincolnshire, TMCR 95.3, and Steel FM, a community based online radio station which broadcast from its studio in Scunthorpe. The town is served by the local newspaper, Doncaster Free Press (formerly Crowle Advertiser).

== Transport ==
Crowle is served by buses provided by East Yorkshire and Hornsbys Bus & Coach which gives the town services to towns of Scunthorpe and Goole. The town is served by Crowle railway station on the South Humberside Main Line, which runs from Doncaster to Scunthorpe.

Crowle North railway station closed to passengers in 1933. It was on the Axholme Joint Railway, which ran from Goole to Lincoln via a connecting spur to the Doncaster to Lincoln Line. The line then closed to freight and excursion services in 1956 to Lincoln and in 1972 to Keadby Power Station as a siding. The site has been for redeveloped for housing, however the station house still survives as a private residence with the old trackbed being converted into a bridleway south towards Belton.

== Bibliography ==
- Brabner, J H F (1897). The Comprehensive Gazetteer of England and Wales 1894-5. UK Genealogy Archives.
- Cory, Vernon (1985). Hatfield and Axholme – An Historical Review. Providence Press. ISBN 978-0-903803-15-1.
- Judge, C.W. (1994). The Axholme Joint Railway. Oakwood Press. ISBN 978-0-85361-441-8.
- North Lincs (2004). "Crowle Conservation Area Appraisal". Lincolnshire County Council. Archived from the original on 5 December 2014.
- Stonehouse, William Brocklehurst (1836). History of the Isle of Axholme (2012 reprint). RareBooksClub.com. ISBN 978-1-130-92268-4.
- White, William (1872). White's History, Gazetteer and Directory of Lincolnshire (PDF) (3rd ed.).
