= Reedness Junction railway station =

Disused railway station in the East Riding of Yorkshire, England

Reedness Junction
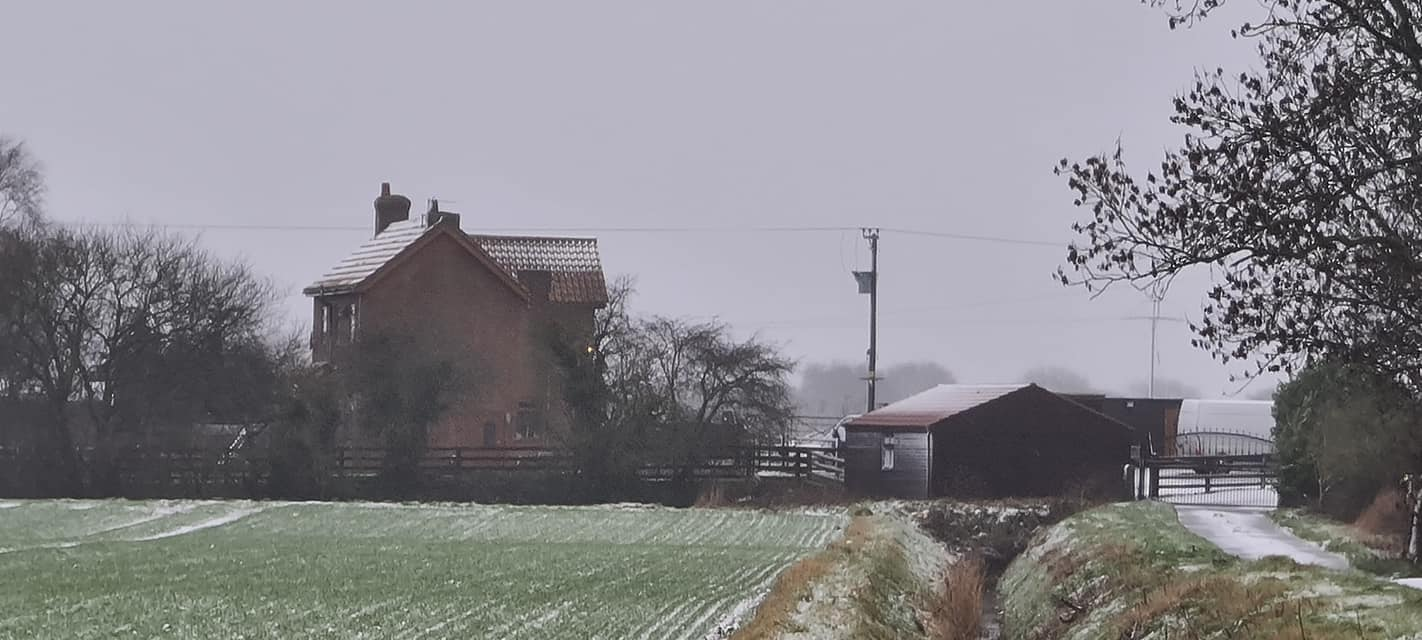
- Reedness Junction in 2021

General information
- Location: Reedness, East Riding of Yorkshire; England
- Coordinates: 53.65311°N 0.84993°W
- Grid reference: SE761180

Other information
- Status: Disused

History
- Original company: Goole and Marshland Light Railway
- Pre-grouping: Axholme Joint Railway
- Post-grouping: Joint LMS and LNER

Key dates
- 8 January 1900: opened for goods
- 10 August 1903: opened for passengers
- 17 July 1933: closed
Location

Reedness Junction railway station was a railway junction near Reedness, East Riding of Yorkshire, England on the Axholme Joint Railway. Immediately to the west of the station, the Fockerby Branch, which continued eastwards, turned off from the main line to Epworth, which curved to the south.

== History ==
The Goole and Marshland Light Railway was one of the early lines to be authorised under the Light Railways Act 1896, which was designed to ease the problems facing the building of rural railways. Four railways were authorised by the Goole and Marshland Light Railway Order 1898 of 16 August 1898, one from the Doncaster to Goole main line at Marshland Junction to Reedness, another from Reedness to Adlingfleet, a branch to Swinefleet and another to Luddington. The first was built as authorised, but the remainder were replaced by a line which followed the course of the second to Eastoft, and then ran to Fockerby via Luddington.

Another light railway order, the Isle of Axholme Light Railway Order 1899, was obtained on 11 March 1899, for the Isle of Axholme Light Railway from Haxey Junction via Epworth and Crowle North to join the Goole and Marshland Railway at Reedness Junction. Both railways negotiated with the North Eastern Railway in January 1900, and the larger company agreed to take over the lines. The station was opened for goods traffic on 8 January 1900. A directors' train, consisting of a contractor's engine and two open trucks, ran on 26 June 1900, and included a trial run to Crowle over the Isle of Axholme Light Railway line. Another inspection, on behalf of the North Eastern Railway before purchasing the line, passed through the station and along the Fockerby Branch to Luddington, as the final section to Garthorpe, later renamed as Fockerby station, had not been completed. Eastoft station was noted to be complete, and the inspector expected Reedness Junction, Luddington and Garthorpe to be finished to a similar standard.

The inspector recommended that a 5,000-imperial-gallon (23,000 L) water tank should be installed at Reedness, with a petroleum gas-engine capable of filling it in two hours, and two water columns, one to fill locomotives on the main line and another in the sidings. He also noted that there was no signalling, but he expected the company to install such equipment as the Board of Trade required.

When the takeover of both lines occurred at the beginning of 1903, the North Eastern Railway was acting jointly with the Lancashire and Yorkshire Railway, and the line became the Axholme Joint Railway, although its official title from 17 February 1904 was the Isle of Axholme Joint Railway (NE and L&Y Joint). The Goole and Marshland line and the Isle of Axholme Light Railway line from Reedness to Crowle were opened for passengers and goods traffic on 10 August 1903, with the line southwards to Haxey Junction following in January 1905, once it was completed.

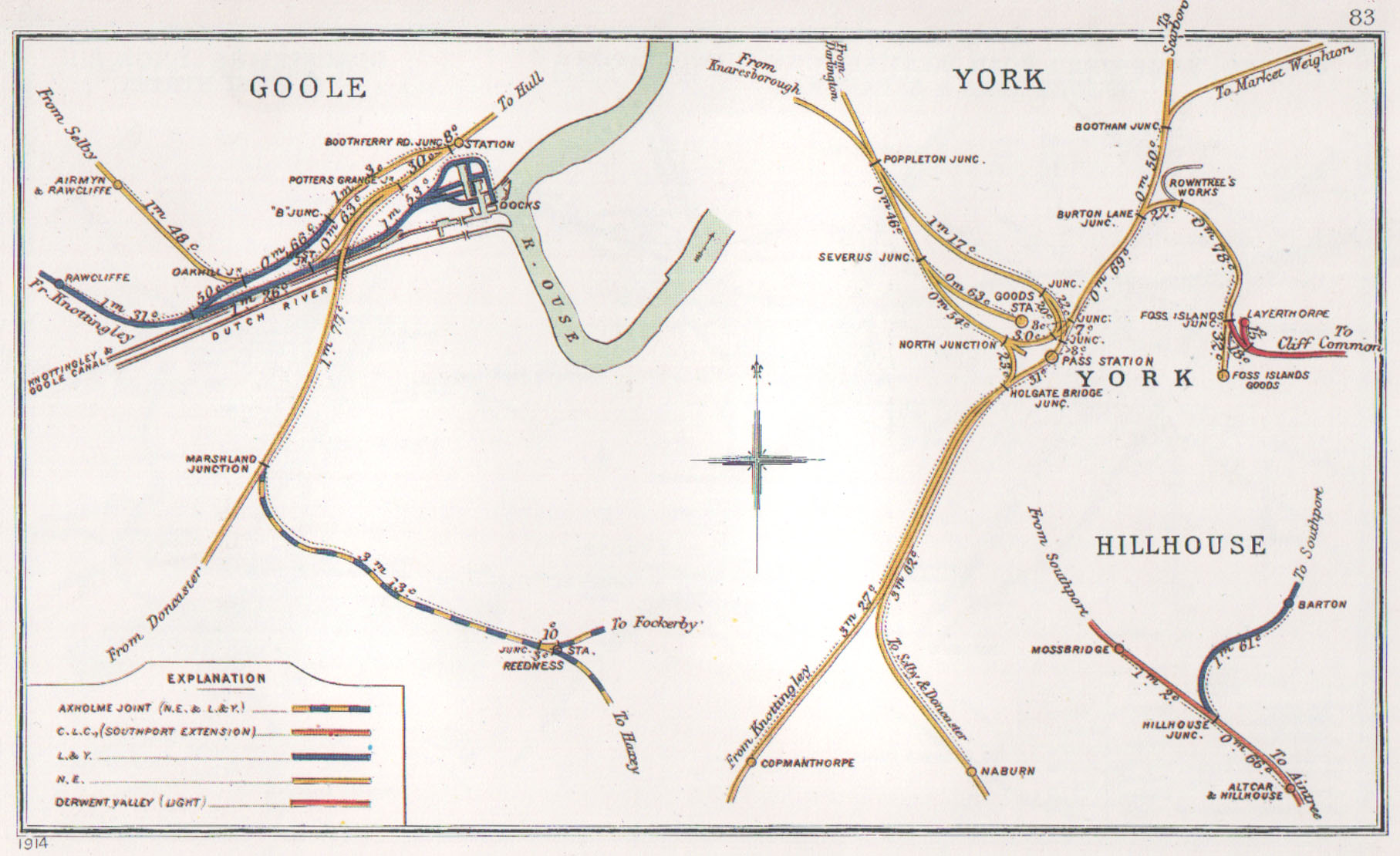
A 1914 Railway Clearing House junction diagram showing (left) railways in the vicinity of Reedness Junction

As built, the junction was to the west of the station, which had two platforms, one on the main line and another on the Fockerby Branch. There were sidings to the north of the single lines, accessible from the Fockerby Branch, and a loop just beyond the sidings. The station master's house was situated between the two lines, and there were wooden buildings used as a signal cabin and a ticket office. A water tank supported by a tall brick tower was located to the north of the sidings. It fed three water columns, and was supplied by a pumping station at Shipcote Drain, 1 1/4 miles (2 km) from the station. The connecting pipe was 2 inches (5 cm) in diameter and was not always adequate. A second tank was erected near the pumping station, but after consideration, the cost of replacing the pipe with a 4-inch (10 cm) one was not thought to be justified.

The railway company held a heated debate in 1906, when Colonel Thompson requested permission for a group of about 16 female potato pickers to be allowed to walk from the station through Reedness Goods Yard, and then cross over Swinefleet Warping Drain by walking along the main line of the railway. His request was to reduce the distance that the ladies had to walk to work each day, and was granted, although the Colonel had to indemnify the railway against claims if any of them were involved in an accident while following this route.

There is some doubt as to the name of the station, as the Railway Clearing House map and some tickets showed it as Reedness, while NER promotional materials and other tickets showed it as Reedness Jct. There is no evidence for a station nameboard, and consequently no photographic evidence either. Traffic was sparse, since the village of Swinefleet was 3 miles (4.8 km) away, and Reedness was 4 miles (6.4 km).

The station closed after the last passenger service on 15 July 1933. The line through the station remained open for goods traffic until 1965. Despite its name, the junction and station were in the adjacent parish of Swinefleet, although both the Fockerby Branch and the main line to Epworth passed through the parish of Reedness to the east of the station.

Preceding station	Disused railways	Following station
Goole; Line closed, station open	Axholme Joint Railway	Eastoft; Line and station closed
Goole; Line closed, station open	Axholme Joint Railway	Crowle North; Line and station closed

== Bibliography ==
- Booth, Adrian (1998). The Peat Railways of Thorne and Hatfield Moors. Industrial Railway Society. ISBN 978-1-90155604-9.
- Judge, C.W. (1994). The Axholme Joint Railway. Oakwood Press. ISBN 978-0-85361-441-8.
