= Haxey Town railway station =

Former railway station in England

Coordinates: 53.4885°N 0.8374°W

Haxey Town
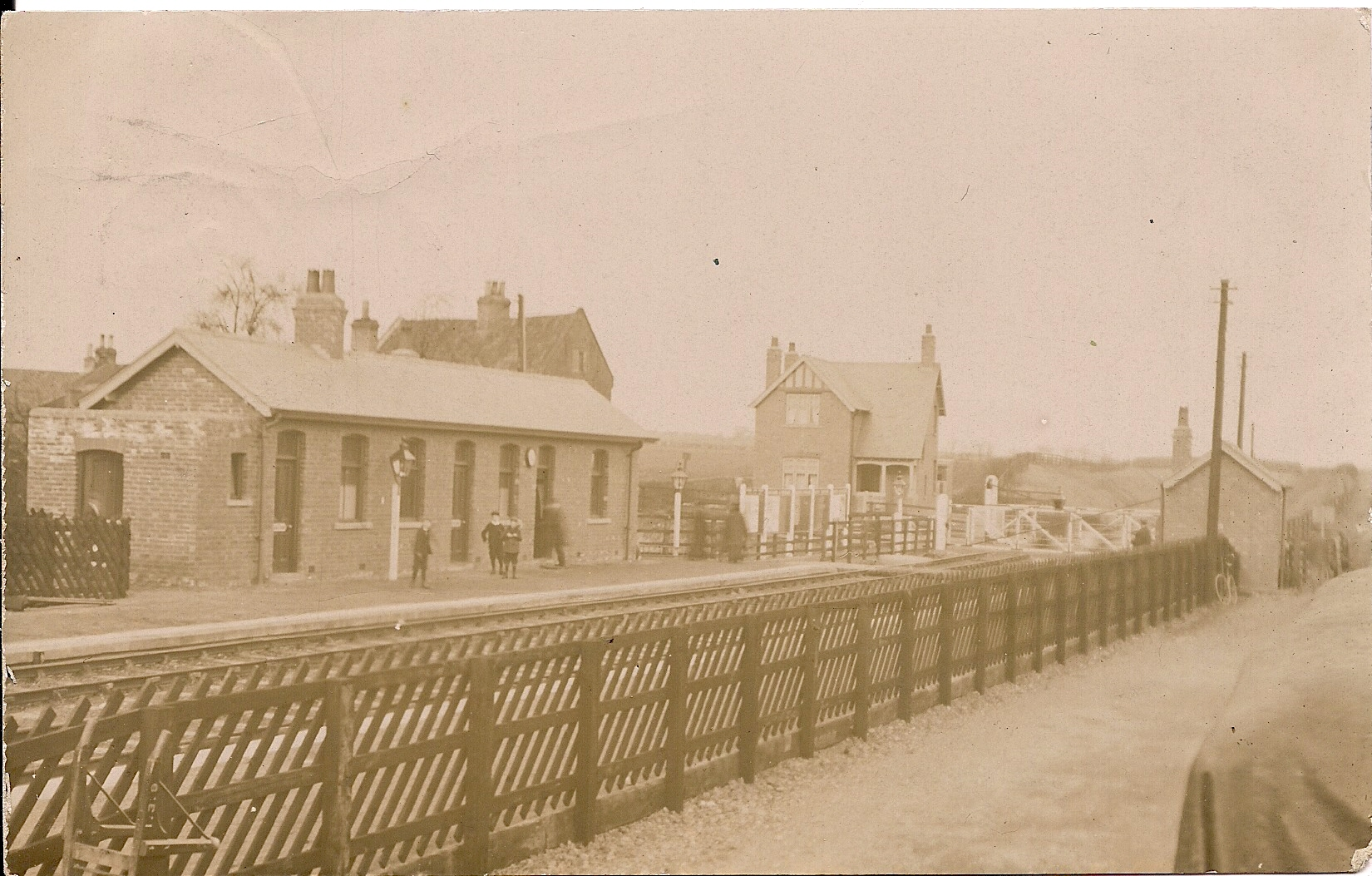

General information
- Location: England

Other information
- Status: Disused

History
- Pre-grouping: Axholme Joint Railway
- Post-grouping: Axholme Joint Railway

Key dates
- 2 January 1905: Opened
- 17 July 1933: Closed
Location

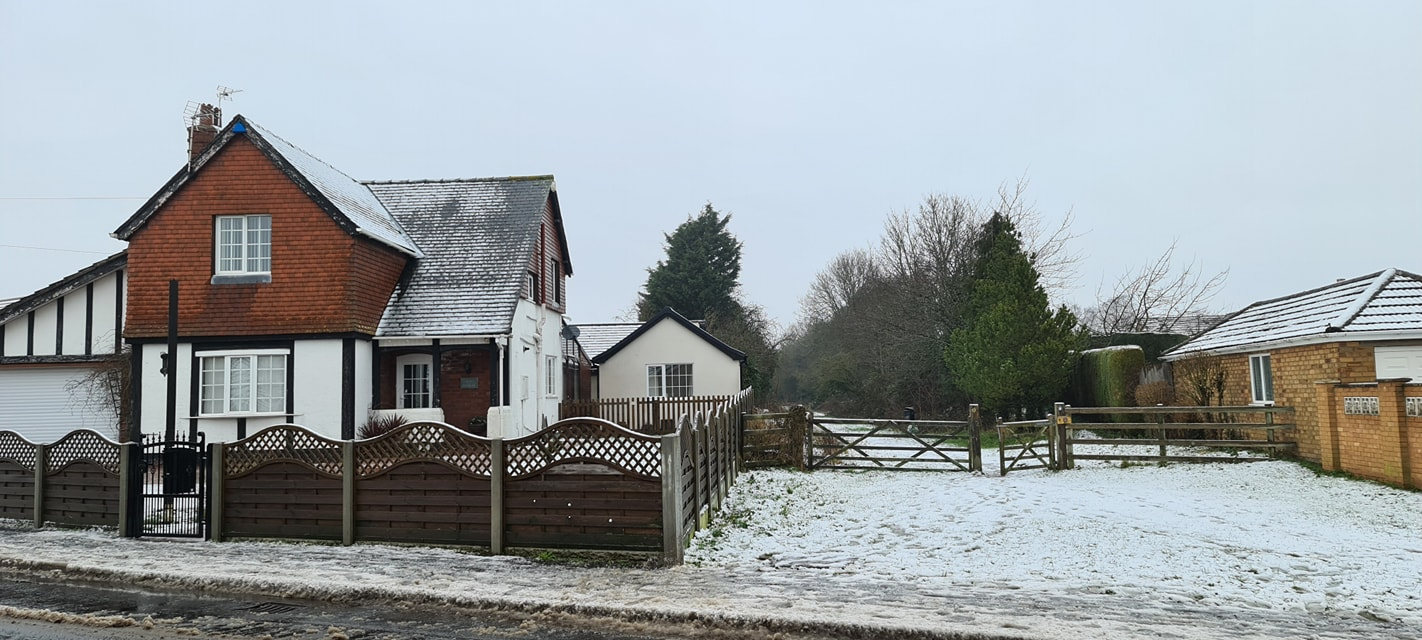
Haxey Town station site in 2021

Haxey Town railway station was a station that served the town of Haxey on the Isle of Axholme in Lincolnshire, England.

Preceding station	Disused railways	Following station
Epworth; Line and station closed	Axholme Joint Railway	Haxey Junction; Line and station closed
