= Haxey and Epworth railway station =

Former railway station in Lincolnshire, England

Coordinates: 53.4665°N 0.8428°W

Haxey and Epworth
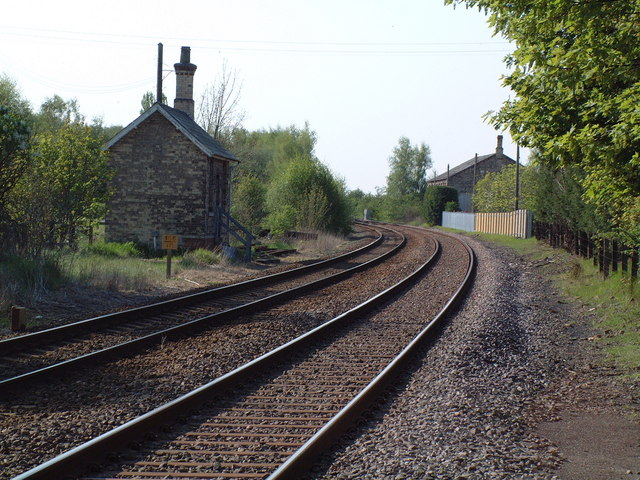
- Haxey and Epworth station site in 2006

General information
- Location: Haxey & Epworth, Lincolnshire; England
- Grid reference: SK769972
- Platforms: 2

Other information
- Status: Disused

History
- Original company: Great Northern Railway
- Pre-grouping: Great Northern and Great Eastern Joint Railway
- Post-grouping: London and North Eastern Railway; Eastern Region of British Railways

Key dates
- 9 Jul 1867: Opened as Haxey
- May 1884: Renamed Haxey and Epworth
- 2 Feb 1959: Closed to passengers
- 29 June 1964: closed to freight
Location

Haxey and Epworth railway station served the towns of Haxey and Epworth on the Isle of Axholme, Lincolnshire, England. It closed to passengers in 1959 and completely in 1964.

From 2 January 1905, it provided an interchange with the Axholme Joint Railway, whose Haxey Junction station was immediately adjacent to it. Although the lines were connected, movement between the stations required two reversals. The interchange ceased on 1 February 1956 when the Haxey Junction to Epworth section of the Axholme Joint Railway was closed.

Haxey was also the junction for the Bawtry to Haxey railway line, which was conceived as a trunk haul route for colliery output. The line never fulfilled that expectation, and the Haxey end may only have been used for wagon storage.

Preceding station	Historical railways	Following station
Park Drain; Line open, station closed	GN and GE Joint	Misterton; Line open, station closed

== Bibliography ==
- Judge, C.W. (1994). The Axholme Joint Railway. Oakwood Press. ISBN 978-0-85361-441-8.
