= William Hull (architect) =

English architect

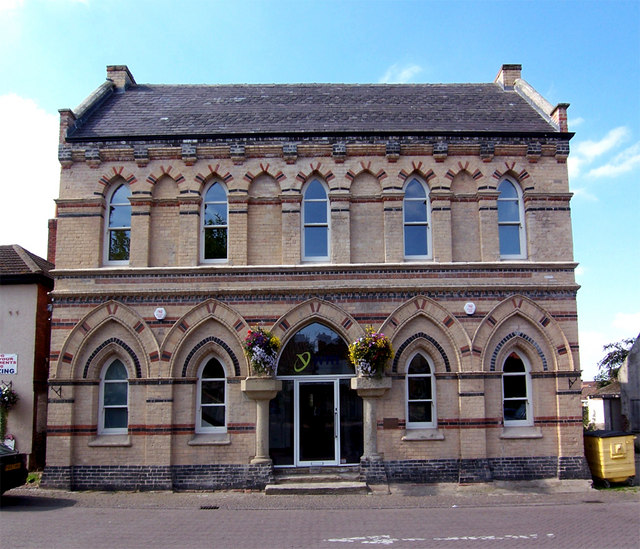
- Market Hall, Crowle 1870
- Born: 1834; Northampton
- Died: 12 April 1911 (aged 76–77); Northampton
- Occupation: Architect
- Practice: 14 St Giles Street, Northampton.
- Buildings: Crowle Market Hall
- Projects: Layout of the Cliftonville Estate in Northampton

William Hull (1843–1934) or William Adin Hull, was an English architect who worked in Northampton.

== Family ==
Hull's father, also William Hull, was an architect and Northampton town surveyor. Hull junior's wife was Kezia Aldam of Crowle in Lincolnshire, who was William Hull's cousin. They had four children, and their son Charles Cornelius Hull was an architectural draughtsman. William Hull lived and worked at 14 St Giles Street, Northampton.

== Architectural work ==
- Beaumont, Cliftonville Estate. (c.1860) House in Italianate Style. Grade II. Circa 1860 by William Hull in Italianate style. Stucco, hipped Welsh slated roof with bracketed cornice. 3 storeys, windows mainly sashes, some round headed. Lower east wing has 8 panelled door and fanlight in inner surround of rusticated pilasters, archivolt, keyblock, outer surround of Corinthian pilasters under dentil pediment. West front ground floor colonnade, upper floors 3 sash windows, those to 1st floor pedimented with consoles. Possibly designed by Hull for himself, along with Nine Springs Villa opposite.
- Shoe making factory for S. Isaac, Campbell & Company, Campbell Square, Northampton. 1857–9. After 1861, occupied by Turner Brothers, Hyde and Co. Three storey, with an ornate office block on the corner of Cambell Square and Victoria Street, and plainer rear ranges, it was demolished in 1982.
- College Street Baptist Church, Northampton (1863)
- Crowle Market Hall (1869/70) The foundation stone was laid in 1869 by Thomas Harsley Carnochan and the hall opened on 7 March 1870. It was funded by capital raised by local businessmen including Mr Potts and Mr Brunyee.Venetian Gothic with Polychrome brickwork. Slate roof with decorative fishtail slate banding. Two storey with five bays at ground floor with central entrance. First floor with gothic windows alternating with blanked windows. Large assembly room on the first floor. Used as a Young Men's Institute, it was a cinema called the Crowle Picturehouse between 1921 and 1939, a dance hall and a restaurant.
- Convent of Notre Dame, Abington Street, Northampton (1871).
- (Possible) Our Lady Help of Christians and St Lawrence, West Street, Olney, Buckinghamshire (1906).

== Literature ==
- Antram, N. (revised); Pevsner, N. & Harris, J., (1989), Lincolnshire. The Buildings of England: Lincolnshire, Penguin Books; reissued by Yale University Press.
