= Little Reedness =

Hamlet in the East Riding of Yorkshire, England

Coordinates: 53.694913°N 0.782759°W

- Location within the East Riding of Yorkshire
- OS grid reference: SE804227
  - London: 155 mi (249 km) S
- Civil parish: Reedness
- Unitary authority: East Riding of Yorkshire
- Ceremonial county: East Riding of Yorkshire
- Region: Yorkshire and the Humber
- Country: England
- Sovereign state: United Kingdom
- Post town: GOOLE
- Postcode district: DN14
- Dialling code: 01405
- Police: Humberside
- Fire: Humberside
- Ambulance: Yorkshire
- UK Parliament: Goole and Pocklington

Little Reedness is a hamlet in the East Riding of Yorkshire, England. It is situated approximately 3.5 miles (6 km) east of the town of Goole and lies on the south bank of the River Ouse.

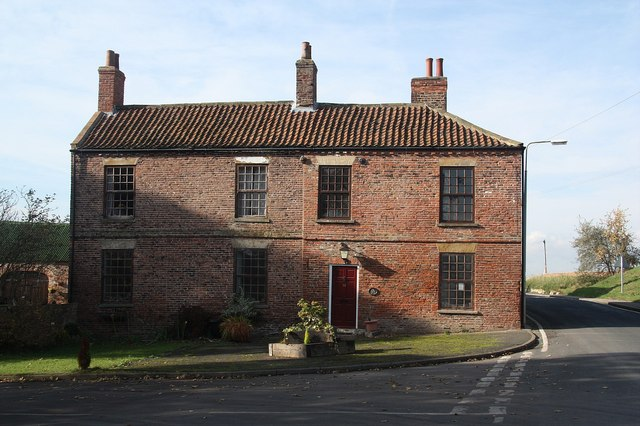
Ferry house, a former pub

Little Reedness forms part of the civil parish of Reedness.
