= Belton railway station =

Disused railway station in Belton, Lincolnshire, England

Belton
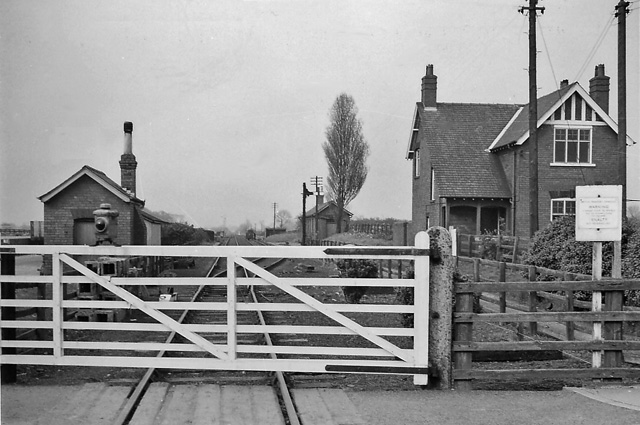
- View northward towards Crowle North

General information
- Location: Belton, Lincolnshire; England
- Coordinates: 53.5570°N 0.8125°W

Other information
- Status: Disused

History
- Original company: Axholme Light Railway
- Pre-grouping: Axholme Joint Railway
- Post-grouping: Joint LMS and LNER

Key dates
- 2 January 1905: opened
- 17 July 1933: closed
Location

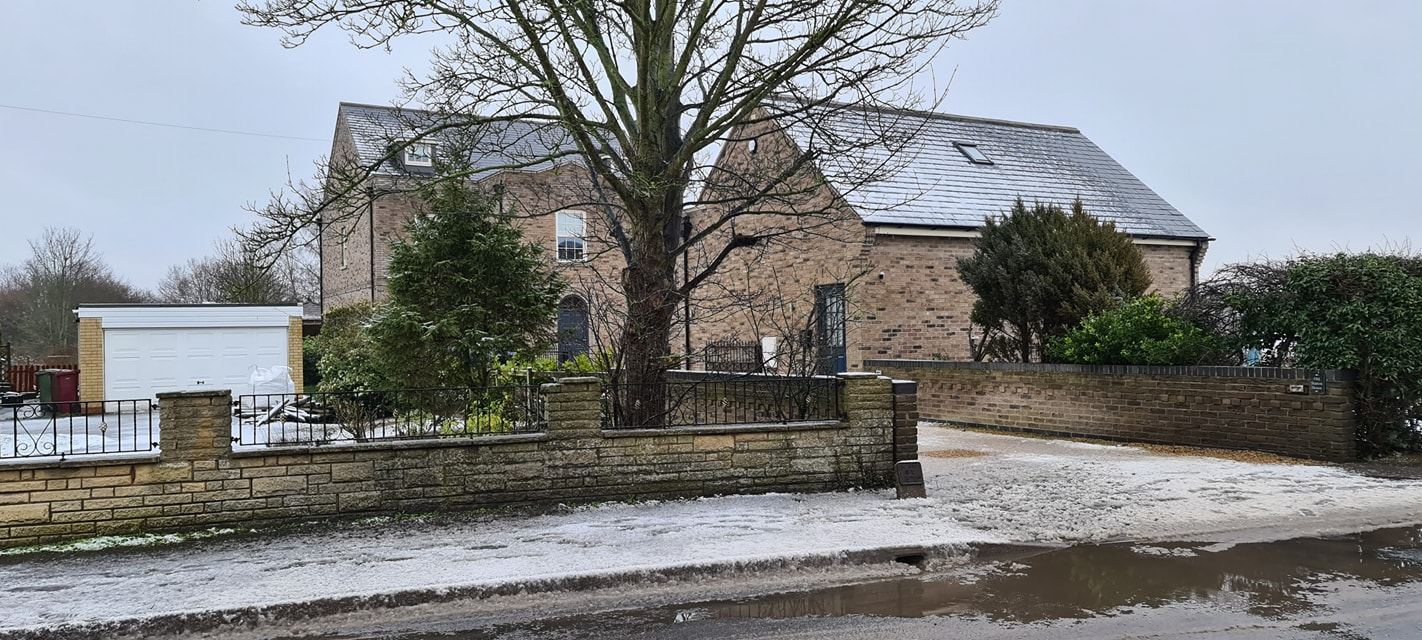
Site of Belton station in 2021

Belton railway station was a station that served the village of Belton on the Isle of Axholme in Lincolnshire, England on the Axholme Joint Railway.

Station Masters

opening - 1927 George Edward Taylor

== History ==
The station was opened for goods on 14 November 1904, and to passengers on 2 January 1905. The station closed with the end of passenger services on the line on 17 July 1933.

== Route ==
Preceding station	Disused railways	Following station
Crowle North	Axholme Joint Railway	Epworth
