= Crowle Stone =

Coordinates: 53.6077°N 0.8352°W

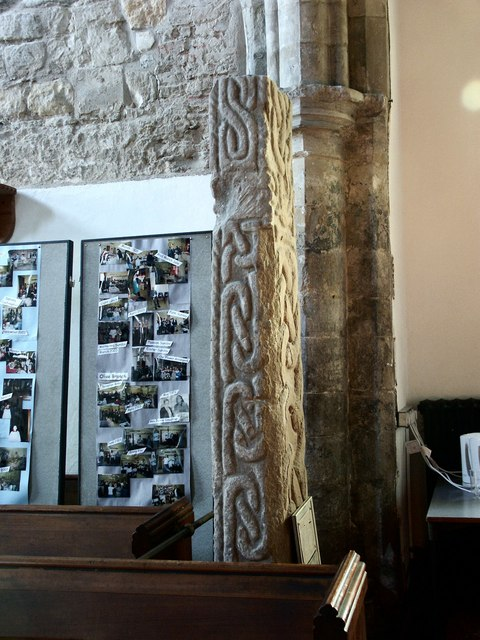
The Crowle Stone

The Crowle Stone is the remains of an Anglo-Saxon cross at the back of the Church of England parish church of St Oswald at Crowle, Lincolnshire.

This was originally carved as a cross shaft and until 1919 it was used as a lintel over the west door. The preservation of the stone is almost certainly a result of the Norman masons reusing it when the church was rebuilt in 1150.

The stone measures 6 ft 11 in (2.11 m) in height 16 in (410 mm) thick and 8.5 in (220 mm) wide.

The stone is ornately carved on all three sides. At the bottom of one face there is a runic inscription which would date the cross shaft as being before 950 AD, as the use of runes had almost completely died out by then.
