= Crowle North railway station =

Railway station in Crowle, Lincolnshire, England

Crowle North
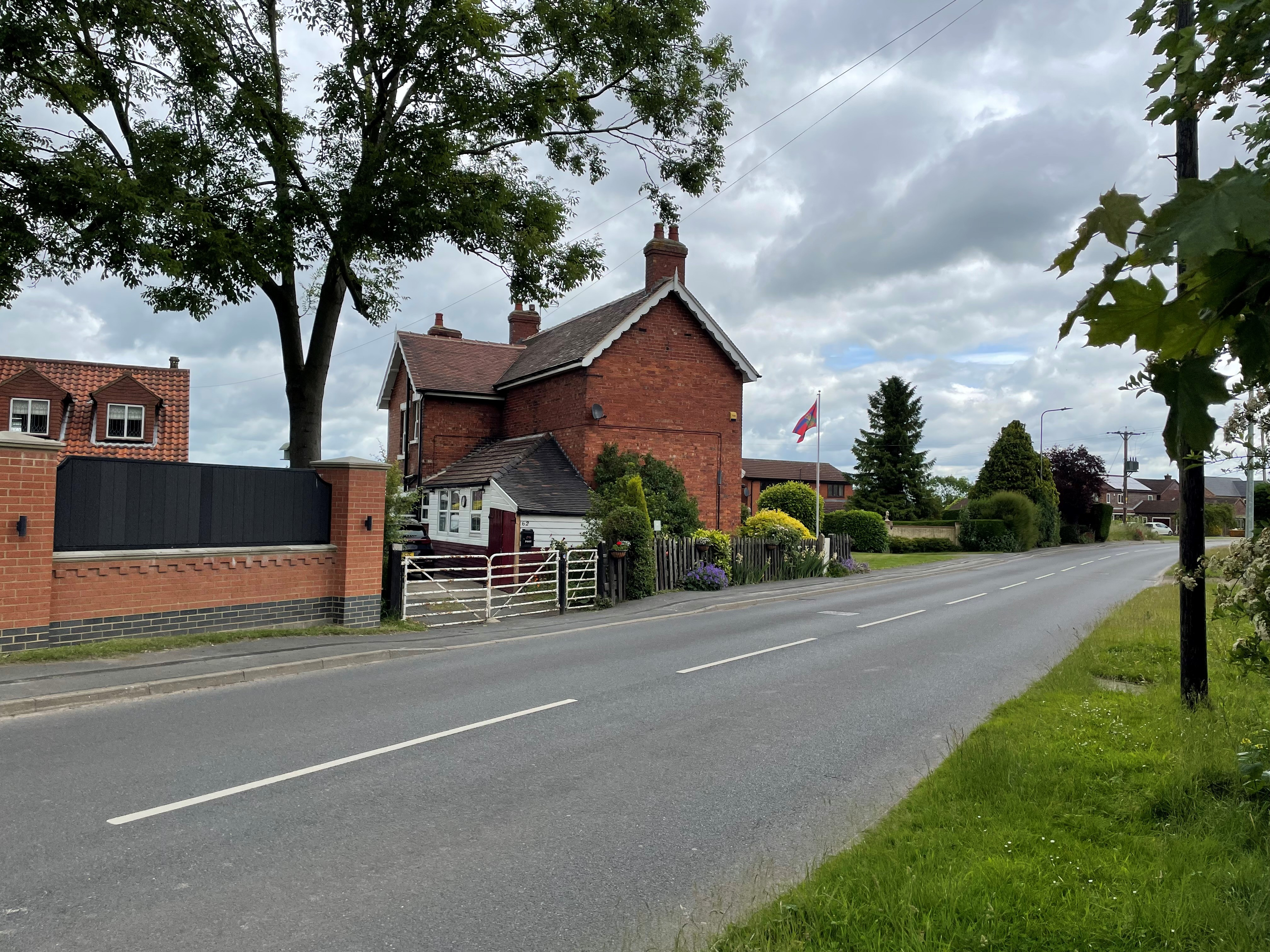
- Crowle North station house in 2022

General information
- Location: Crowle, Lincolnshire; England
- Coordinates: 53.61294°N 0.8297°W
- Owner: Roy Scarrott & Kathleen Ramsden

Other information
- Status: Disused

History
- Original company: Axholme Light Railway
- Pre-grouping: Axholme Joint Railway
- Post-grouping: Joint LMS and LNER

Key dates
- 10 August 1903: opened
- 17 July 1933: closed
Location

Crowle North railway station, officially known as Crowle railway station, was a station that served the market town of Crowle, on the Isle of Axholme in Lincolnshire, England on the Axholme Joint Railway. The North designation was used to avoid confusion with Crowle railway station on a neighbouring line.

The station was opened on 10 August 1903. Originally it was the terminus of the line from Goole, until the section onward to Haxey Junction was opened for goods on 14 November 1904, and to passengers on 2 January 1905. The station closed with the end of passenger services on the line on 17 July 1933, Although the line remained open to goods traffic until 1965.

Until 1972 the line through Crowle to Belton was operated as 'a long siding' to facilitate access for heavy loads to Keadby Power Station.

This was the Station Master's House and Booking Office for Crowle on the Axholme Joint Railway, a light railway that ran the length of the Isle of Axholme.

The booking office was situated in the low single storey wooden extension and its interior has been preserved

The station had two low platforms, a passing loop and a small goods yard with a public weighbridge.

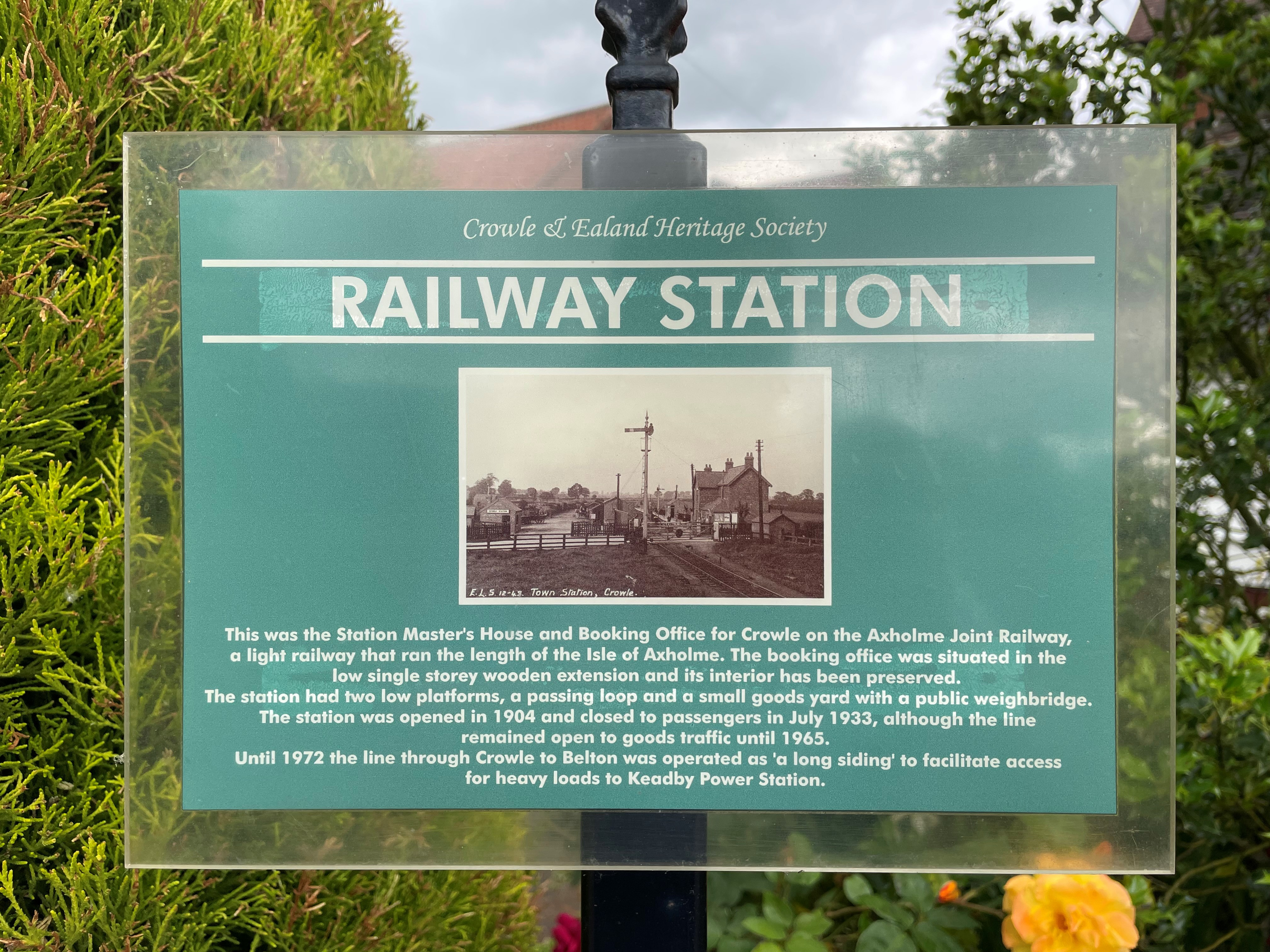
Station info 2022

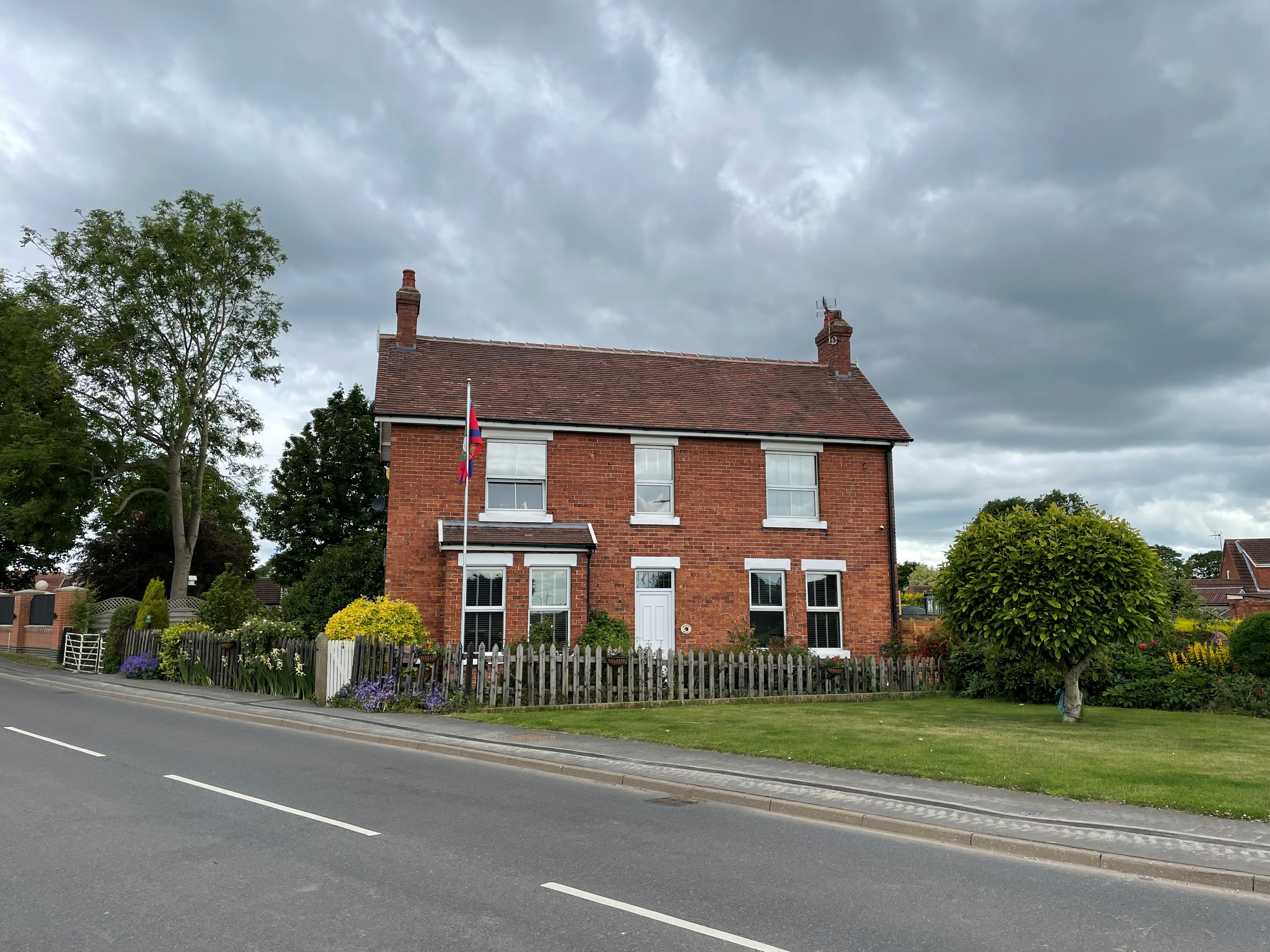
Station House Front in 2022

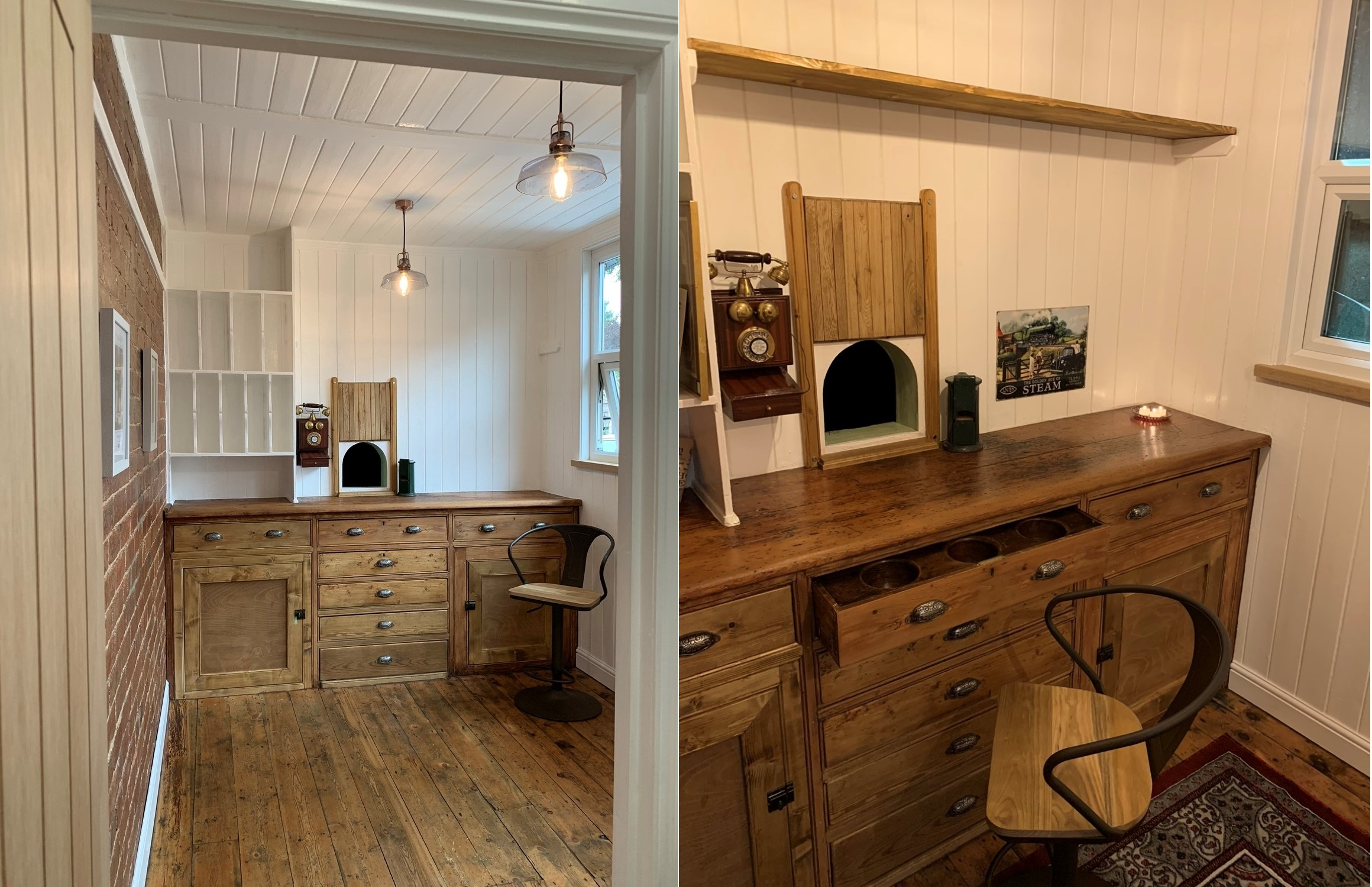
Inside Crowle Station Booking Office 2022

== Former services ==
| Preceding station | Disused railways | Following station |
|---|---|---|
| Reedness Junction | Axholme Joint Railway | Belton |
