= Listed buildings in Swinefleet =

Swinefleet is a civil parish in the county of the East Riding of Yorkshire, England. It contains five listed buildings that are recorded in the National Heritage List for England. All the listed buildings are designated at Grade II, the lowest of the three grades, which is applied to "buildings of national importance and special nterest". The parish contains the village of Swinefleet and the surrounding area. The listed buildings consist of a farmhouse, a range of farm buildings, a disused windmill and two houses.

== Buildings ==
Name and location	Photograph	Date	Notes
Park Farmhouse; 53.69077°N 0.83025°W	—	Mid to late 18th century	The farmhouse is in red brick, with stone dressings, a floor band, a deep modillion eaves cornice, and a swept hipped tile roof. There are two storeys and an L-shaped plan, the main range with a double depth plan and five bays, with a two-bay rear extension on the left, and infill in the angle. The middle bay projects and contains a doorway with fluted pilasters with foliate capitals, a fanlight with radial glazing, an entablature, a decorated frieze, a dentilled cornice and a moulded pediment with festoons in the tympanum. The windows are sashes in architraves with rubbed brick flat arches and raised keystones. On the left return is a bow window with a coped parapet.
Stable and coach house, Park Farm; 53.69051°N 0.83051°W	—	Late 18th to early 19th century	The farm buildings are in brick, and have a tile roof with stone coped gables on shaped kneelers. There is a single storey and an attic, and a front with five openings, including an elliptical-arched carriage entrance. On the right return and on the rear is an oculus.
Windmill tower 53.69533°N 0.82092°W		Late 18th to early 19th century	The former windmill is in brick, and consists of a tapered round tower with four storeys and stepped eaves. It contains a doorway and other openings, all with segmental-arched heads.
87 High Street; 53.69119°N 0.83634°W	—	Early 19th century	A house, and a stable and coach house to the right later incorporated into the house, in red brick, the sides and front of the house in yellow brick, and with tile roofs. The house has two storeys and three bays, and a moulded wooden eaves cornice. The central doorway has reeded pilasters, a semicircular fanlight, a ribbed frieze, a moulded cornice on tapered consoles, and a hood. The windows are sashes in architraves with cambered wedge lintels and incised panels. The former stable and coach house to the right have two storeys and four bays. The openings include a segmental-arched carriage entrance.
Shrublands; 53.69200°N 0.83306°W	—	Early to mid-19th century	A house in yellow-brown brick on a plinth, with a plain wooden eaves board, and a hipped Welsh slate roof. There are two storeys, a square plan, and a front of three bays. On the front is a Tuscan porch with half-columns, a hood and a blocking course, and a doorway with a fanlight and a moulded cornice. The windows are sashes with channelled cambered wedge lintels and keystones. On the left return is a tall round-headed stair window with raised imposts and a keystone.
