= Doncaster Free Press =

Weekly newspaper in Doncaster, England

- Type: Weekly newspaper
- Format: Tabloid
- Owner: Iconic Media Group
- Editor-in-chief: Ben Green
- Editor: Ben Green
- Staff writers: Reporters and content curators: Laura Andrew, Harry Harrison, Stephanie Bateman, Darren Burke, Ricky Charlesworth
- Founded: 18 June 1925
- Language: English
- Circulation: 3,272 (as of 2023)
- Sister newspapers: The Star (Sheffield), Yorkshire Post
- Website: doncasterfreepress.co.uk

The Doncaster Free Press is a weekly newspaper in Doncaster, South Yorkshire, England. It is owned by Iconic Media Group.

== Content of the newspaper ==
The Free Press, or DFP as it is sometimes known, is published each Thursday. Its sections include news, sport, crime, Your Week, Your World, In Court, Business, Education, Environment, Retro, Walks, Your Puzzles, Entertainment and Travel, jobs, promotions and competitions, puzzles, property and motors as well as an extensive classified and display advertising section featuring family announcements.

== Paul Foot Award ==
Doncaster Free Press journalist Deborah Wain jointly won the Paul Foot Award in 2007, for exposing corruption in the Doncaster Education City project.

== Industrial action of 2011 ==
On 15 July 2011, NUJ-represented staff employed within the Doncaster Free Press walked out on indefinite strike, along with those from the South Yorkshire Times, the Goole Courier and the Selby Times. Staff returned on 8 September to allow talks to commence, after 55 consecutive days away from work.

== Offices ==
Staff work from home. The paper left its Sunny Bar home of 89 years to move to new premises in January 2014. Reporters still live and work in Doncaster. It was first published on 18 June 1925.

== Current and previous editors of the Free Press ==
The current editor of the newspaper is Ben Green. Previous editors are Nancy Fielder, Dominic Brown, Liam Hoden, Phil Bramley, Chris Burton, Graeme Huston, Merrill Diplock, Martin Edmunds, Richard Tear, Leonard Peet, Maurice Coupe and the paper's founder and first editor, Richard "Dickie" Crowther. These are the only editors in the entire history of the newspaper.

It is part of the Iconic Media Group.

== Other publications ==
The SYN stable also used to include paid-for weekly titles such as South Yorkshire Times, Epworth Bells and Crowle Advertiser, Gainsborough Standard and Worksop Guardian. Former titles such as the Selby Times, as well as free titles the Doncaster Advertiser, Goole and Howden Courier and Thorne and District Gazette are now either defunct or have been swallowed into other publications.
