= Axholme Joint Railway =

Successor to the Goole and Marshland Railway and Axholme Light Railway

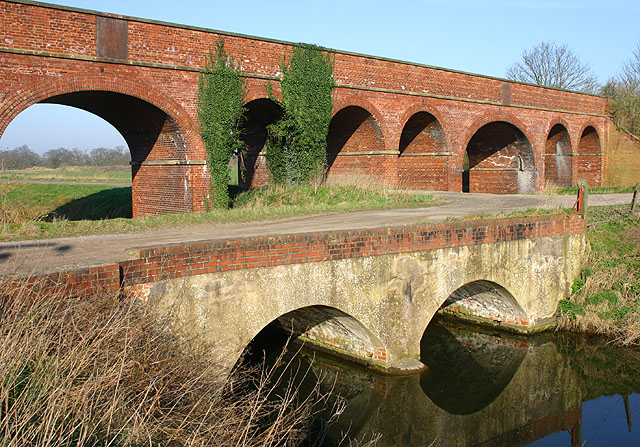
- The viaduct which carried the Axholme Joint Railway over the Folly Drain and the South Engine Drain

Overview
- Dates of operation: 1900–1933
- Predecessor: Goole and Marshland Light Railway and Axholme Light Railway
- Successor: Joint London, Midland and Scottish Railway and London and North Eastern Railway

Technical
- Track gauge: 4 ft 8 1/2 in (1,435 mm)

The Axholme Joint Railway was a committee created as a joint enterprise between the Lancashire and Yorkshire Railway (L&Y) and the North Eastern Railway (NER) and was established by the North Eastern Railway Act 1902 (2 Edw. 7. c. clxviii) of 31 July 1902. It took over the Goole and Marshland Railway, running from Marshland Junction near Goole to Reedness Junction and Fockerby, and the Isle of Axholme Light Railway, running from Reedness Junction to Haxey Junction. Construction of the Goole and Marshland Railway had begun in 1898, and by the time of the takeover in early 1903, was virtually complete. The Isle of Axholme Light Railway was started in 1899, but only the section from Reedness Junction to Crowle was complete at the takeover. The northern section opened on 10 August 1903, and the line from Crowle to Haxey Junction opened for passengers on 2 January 1905.

A branch to Hatfield Moor was opened in 1909, but traffic from the peat works at Hatfield did not start to use the railway until 1913, when the company extended their line into the works. Traffic was mainly agricultural produce, together with peat from Hatfield Moor and from Swinefleet Peat Works which processed peat from Thorne Moors. Passenger services ceased in 1933, although occasional excursion trains continued to be run. The Haxey Junction to Epworth section closed in 1956, the Hatfield Moor Branch closed in 1964, and the remainder closed in 1965. However, most of the tracks were retained and operated as a long siding, to allow it to be used to carry heavy parts from Keadby Power Station across the Stainforth and Keadby Canal, as the bridge on the A161 road could not support the weight. The road bridge was replaced in 1970, and the rails were finally removed in 1972.

== History ==
The Isle of Axholme lies to the west of the River Trent and to the east of Hatfield Chase, a vast area of low-lying land which was described as a badly drained swamp in the 1620s. It was recorded as Axeyholme, with the three syllables Ax-ey-holme meaning water-island-island being contributed by successive groups of Celts, Angles and Danes. In the reign of King Charles I, the Dutch drainage engineer Cornelius Vermuyden set about draining Hatfield Chase, containing some 70,000 acres (280 km^{2}) of wetland, in 1626. The River Don, River Torne and River Idle were re-routed and re-channelled, and although there were some flaws in the initial scheme, and considerable social unrest, including damage of the drainage works, the unrest was finally resolved in 1719, and the agriculture of the area prospered. The Stainforth and Keadby Canal cut across the region in 1802, providing some transport facilities, but the coming of the railway age resulted in calls for railways to be built to carry the agricultural produce to market.

=== Precursors ===
The South Yorkshire Railway built a line which ran broadly parallel to the Stainforth and Keadby Canal, passing through Crowle. Two plans for railways from London to York, which would have crossed the Isle, were proposed but not built, while the more local Isle of Axholme Extension Railway would have linked Haxey, Epworth, Crowle and Thorne. In 1846, the railway financier George Hudson proposed a line from Goole to be called the Isle of Axholme, Gainsborough and York and North Midland Junction Railway, which failed to obtain an act of Parliament, but much of its route was used by the railway which did eventually get built.

Isle of Axholme Railway Act 1885 (Note: Section 1.)
- Act of Parliament
- Parliament of the United Kingdom
- Long title: An Act for authorising the Construction of Railways in the Isle of Axholme in the county of Lincoln to be called the Isle of Axholme Railway and for other purposes.
- Citation: 48 & 49 Vict. c. liv
- Territorial extent: United Kingdom

Dates
- Royal assent: 25 June 1885
- Commencement: 25 June 1885 (Note: The Acts of Parliament (Commencement) Act 1793.)
- Repealed: 30 April 1888

Other legislation
- Repealed by: Isle of Axholme Railway (Abandonment) Act 1888

Status: Repealed

Text of statute as originally enacted

Isle of Axholme Railway (Abandonment) Act 1888
- Act of Parliament
- Parliament of the United Kingdom
- Long title: An Act for the abandonment of the Isle of Axholme Railway.
- Citation: 51 & 52 Vict. c. viii
- Territorial extent: United Kingdom

Dates
- Royal assent: 30 April 1888
- Commencement: 30 April 1888
- Repealed: 31 January 2013

Other legislation
- Repeals/revokes: Isle of Axholme Railway Act 1885
- Repealed by: Statute Law (Repeals) Act 2013

Status: Repealed

Text of statute as originally enacted

In 1882, the Isle of Axholme and Marshland Steam Tramway was authorised by the Isle of Axholme and Marshland Tramways Order 1882. It would run from Haxey to Crowle, and would use a gauge of 3 ft 6 in (1,067 mm). However, in 1883 the company joined forces with, and was then taken over by, the Manchester, Sheffield and Lincolnshire Railway to resist a proposal for the Goole, Epworth and Owston Railway. The defeat of the rival scheme was resented by local businessmen. Under an act of Parliament, the Isle of Axholme Railway Act 1885 (48 & 49 Vict. c. liv), the tramway was abandoned and the Isle of Axholme Railway was authorised, but this too was abandoned three years later by another act of Parliament, the Isle of Axholme Railway (Abandonment) Act 1888 (51 & 52 Vict. c. viii). Nothing more happened, until the passing of the Light Railways Act 1896 (59 & 60 Vict. c. 48), which meant that rural railways could be authorised by an order from the Board of Trade, rather than having to obtain a costly act of Parliament.

=== Proposals ===
The Goole and Marshland Light Railway was one of the first to take advantage of the new Light Railways Act 1896 (59 & 60 Vict. c. 48). A public enquiry held in Goole on 8 October 1897 showed that the plans, which would cost £59,602 to implement, had local support, and the farmers' club estimated that the railway would carry 51,625 tons of agricultural produce per year. The Goole and Marshland Light Railway Order 1898 was issued on 16 August 1898, enabling construction to proceed. It sanctioned four railways and a road. Leaving the Doncaster to Goole main line (Hull and Doncaster Branch), a line composed of two of the railways ran to Adlingfleet via Eastoft, and there were branches to Swinefleet and Luddington. 2 miles (3.2 km) of road were needed to provide access to the railway. The maximum speed was restricted to 15 miles per hour (24 km/h), and locomotives with tenders were not allowed to run tender-first.

The Isle of Axholme Light Railway was proposed in 1897, running from Haxey Junction to Crowle via Epworth and Belton. At Haxey, it would join the Great Northern and Great Eastern Joint Railway, while at Crowle it would pass over and also connect to the Great Central Railway, and would join the Goole and Marshland Light Railway at Reedness Junction. Two branches, to Hatfield Moor and Newlands, were proposed. Like its northern neighbour, the plans had strong local support, and a light railway order, the Isle of Axholme Light Railways Order 1898, was granted on 11 March 1899. A request by the Sheffield and South Yorkshire Navigation Company that the swing bridge over the canal near Crowle should be maintained in the open position to allow free passage of boats, rather than in the closed position to prefer the railway, was refused, as was an application for running powers over the line by the Great Northern and Great Eastern Joint Railway.

Neither railway remained independent for long. Both were negotiating with the North Eastern Railway by January 1900, and agreement was reached that the larger railway would run both of the new lines, also representing them at the Railway Clearing House. As well as the agricultural traffic, the route would provide access to coal from the South Yorkshire coalfields. The Lancashire and Yorkshire Railway also needed routes into the coalfields, and the two companies agreed with the two new railways on a takeover plan. The North Eastern Railway Act 1902 (2 Edw. 7. c. clxviii) of 31 July 1902 dissolved, transferred to and vested both companies in the North Eastern and the Lancashire and Yorkshire railway companies jointly, with three directors appointed by each company. They paid £73,500 for the Goole and Marshland line, which had been completed, and £27,500 for the Isle of Axholme Light Railway, which was still in the early stages of construction.

=== Construction ===
Construction of the Goole and Marshland Light Railway began on 22 September 1898 at Eastoft, where the first sod was cut by the chairman, William Halkon. There was some initial disagreement with the North Eastern Railway over Marshland Junction, but this was resolved in December, and the first section of the virtually flat railway was opened from Marshland Junction to Reedness Junction on 8 January 1900, initially for goods traffic only. A locomotive and two open wagons were used to form a Directors' train to inspect the line to Eastoft on 26 June, and the North Eastern Railway carried out a survey in December before purchasing the line. At the time, the railway was open as far at Luddington, and the final section to Garthorpe was expected to be laid within a month. Eastoft station was completed, and the NER expected Reedness Junction, Luddington and Garthorpe stations to be finished to a similar standard. Garthorpe station was eventually renamed Fockerby.

The railway claimed its first lives when two contractor's locomotives collided in thick fog near Eastoft on 4 January 1901. Both of the locomotives were damaged, and the crew of one were scalded when the boiler tubes burst. The driver died the following day, and the stoker a few days after that. Another inspection train was run on 26 June 1901, starting from Reedness Junction and visiting, according to the Crowle Advertiser, Creyke Siding, Garthorpe and Crowle. The train consisted of two first-class carriages and an open truck. A dinner was held at the Darby and Joan Hotel in Crowle, before the party returned to Reedness. Although Creyke siding was mentioned, this term was normally applied to a siding serving Creyke's peat works on the North Eastern Railway main line to the south of Marshland Junction.

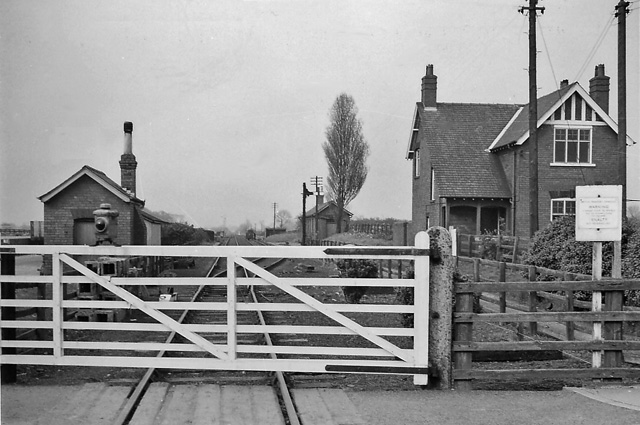
Belton station in 1961, shortly before closure of the line

The cutting of the first sod for the Isle of Axholme Light Railway was an altogether grander occasion. It took place on 20 July 1899, and was reported at great length in the Epworth Bells newspaper. The ceremony was performed by Miss Bletcher, the daughter of one of the Directors, after which a luncheon for a large number of people was held in a marquee. Following speeches, about 400 children were given a free tea in the Temperance Hall, while adults were catered for in the schoolrooms of four local chapels. Sports were then held, watched by a crowd of 1,500, and finally there was a fireworks display. Most of the children later received a commemorative medal.

Construction proceeded slowly, to the extent that there were letters in the local newspaper complaining about the delays. The first train ran into Epworth on 25 November 1901, to test the new bridge, and the event was attended by a crowd of over 400. The line involved more earthworks than the Goole and Marshland Light Railway, with major cuttings at Haxey and Epworth, where steam excavators were used, and a swing bridge over the canal at Crowle. The first fatality was a 15-year-old boy who was hit by a rock during blasting, and died at Doncaster Hospital in early 1902.

By the end of 1902, the section from Crowle to Reedness Junction was finished, as was the line from Epworth to Haxey Junction. The railways became part of the Axholme Joint Railway in early 1903, and the northern sections, from Marshland Junction to Fockerby and Crowle, were opened for passengers and goods on 10 August 1903 19 November 1903. Only Crowle swing bridge remained to be finished by March 1904, and the southern section opened for goods traffic on 14 November. The Board of Trade required several improvements to be made before it passed the line as suitable for passengers, and the formal opening took place on 2 January 1905. The work had involved excavating 820,000 cubic yards (630,000 m^{3}) of earth to form the cuttings between Epworth and Haxey, and another 200,000 cubic yards (150,000 m^{3}) had been used to construct the embankments by Crowle swing bridge. 11,000 cubic yards (8,400 m^{3}) of bricks and 8,000 cubic yards (6,100 m^{3}) of concrete had also been used. Since 17 February 1904, the official name of the undertaking had been the Isle of Axholme Joint Railway (NE and L&Y Joint).

=== Hatfield Moor branch ===
An application for a light railway order for the Hatfield Moor Extension Light Railway was made in November 1904, and the Axholme Joint Railway (Hatfield Moor Extension Light Railway) Order 1905 was granted on 5 August 1905. The contract to build it was given to John Moffat of Manchester on 27 September 1907, and the contract price was £14,649. Construction took one and a half years, and the branch opened on 1 March 1909. Because the area through which it ran is low-lying, and had been the subject of drainage schemes since 1626, the railway had several bridges over rivers and drains. Between Epworth and Sandtoft goods station, it crossed the Folly Drain, the New Idle River and the River Torne. Beyond the station it crossed the North Idle Drain, and then ran along the bank of the Hatfield Waste Drain to reach its terminus at Hatfield Moor, close to the Hatfield Peat Works, then owned by the British Moss Litter Company (BMLC).

Facilities were limited, with a borehole 230 feet (70 m) deep supplying a water column at Sandtoft, and a run-round loop with a lever frame at Hatfield Moor, where the staff consisted of a single porter. Traffic was agricultural, but the railway company hoped to obtain the peat traffic. They held discussions in September 1909, but the BMLC continued to transport their peat overland to Maud's Bridge goods yard, on the Doncaster to Scunthorpe line. The Axholme Joint Railway then built a loading dock for the peat, which was completed in December 1911, but still did not succeed in getting the peat traffic. An agreement was eventually made in April 1913, which required the railway company to extend their line into the peat works. When completed, all peat left the works on the Axholme Joint Railway. It continued to serve the works until 30 September 1963, and was formally closed on 29 February 1964.

There was a siding from the main line to Swinefleet Works, which was also owned by the British Moss Litter Company. The works had a 3 ft 7 in (1,093 mm) steam railway which ran northwards from the works to the banks of the River Ouse at Swinefleet Clough. The line crossed the intended route of the Reedness Junction to Fockerby Branch, and the North Eastern Railway met with the BMLC in October 1902, hoping that they could persuade them to waive their right to a level crossing, in return for a payment. The exact outcome is not clear, but a siding was laid into the works, which was operational from 10 August 1903, and the peat railway was lifted at about that time. Peat was brought to the works by a network of 3 ft (914 mm) railways spreading out southwards across Thorne Moors.

=== Operation ===
Passenger traffic was sparse through most of the life of the railway. In 1905, three trains per day ran from Goole to Haxey Junction and back, with a separate train operating on the Fockerby Branch. By November, only the morning and evening train ran, except on Wednesdays. A coal strike in 1912 resulted in all services being withdrawn except on Wednesdays and Saturdays for a period of three weeks. At a public meeting held in October 1920, users complained about the poor service and the lack of trucks to carry goods. The chairman of the Isle of Axholme Rural District Council was particularly exasperated by the fact that the trains arrived at Haxey Junction shortly after the trains on the other line had departed.

Motor buses appeared in the district from 1924, and passenger numbers dropped. Cheap fares and a steam railcar did not halt the decline, although in the last days of operation, five trains were run on Saturdays, three on Wednesdays and two on other weekdays. The last trains ran on 15 July 1933, with all passenger services suspended from Monday 17 July. In addition to timetabled services, excursions were run, with Epworth, the birthplace of John Wesley, the founder of Methodism being popular. The Lancashire and Yorkshire Railway published a booklet entitled Epworth: What to see and how to get there to entice people to travel there from Lancashire and the West Riding of Yorkshire. Excursions from the Isle of Axholme to Blackpool were popular, with over 600 passengers on such a trip in 1913, and 750 visiting the Great Yorkshire Show at Hull in 1922. Excursions to Blackpool continued to be run even after timetabled passenger services were withdrawn.

Early freight traffic consisted of agricultural products, including carrots, celery, clover, peas, potatoes, sugar beet and swedes, together with large volumes of peat from Swinefleet Works near Reedness Junction and from Hatfield Works on the Hatfield Moor Branch. Traffic into the area included manure. In the 1920s, stations notified the control centre at Goole of the number of wagons they would need for consignments of peas and potatoes, and could also request additional trains. 4,000 tons of green peas were despatched during the 1926 growing season, and in the following year, 7,000 bundles of celery left Epworth station in a three-day period. Traffic started to decline in the 1930s, as motor lorries began to take some of the trade. By 1937, there were only three workings each day, and those were run if required. The peat works at Hatfield was still supplying an average of six wagon-loads per day.

=== Closure ===
The line closed to passengers on 15 July 1933. The section from Haxey Junction to Epworth was closed on 1 February 1956, by which time most of the traffic was peat, supplemented by seasonal sugar-beet. The branch to Hatfield Moors was rarely used from 1962, when small diesel locomotives had replaced steam traction, and was closed on 30 September 1963. The rest of the system closed on 5 April 1965.

Although closed, the line was not lifted, and was maintained as a long siding until 1972, on behalf of the Central Electricity Generating Board, who paid for its maintenance. This was to facilitate the maintenance of the stators from Keadby Power Station, which were too heavy to be transported over the bridge where the A161 road crossed the Stainforth and Keadby Canal. When required, the heavy haulage company Pickfords would move a stator by road to Ealand depot, to the south of Crowle. It would then be loaded onto the railway, and moved across the canal to Belton, where it would be transferred back to the road vehicle. The A161 road bridge was replaced by Lindsey County Council in 1970, and the complicated manoeuvres became unnecessary. Consequently, the rails were removed in 1972.

== Route ==
The Goole and Marshland Light Railway ran from Marshland Junction, south east of Goole on the North Eastern Railway Hull to Thorne line, to Reedness Junction with a branch line from Reedness to Fockerby on the River Trent estuary. The junction with the North Eastern Railway faced Goole, and all traffic started from or proceeded to Goole. Since the railway served the needs of the agricultural community, there were many sidings, where wagons could be stored for loading and unloading. On the first section, these were Plumtree Farm siding, Dougherty's siding, Corner's siding, Smith's siding, Glossop's siding, and Goole Fields siding, before the railway crossed over Swinefleet Warping Drain on a 120-foot (37 m) steel girder bridge to reach Reedness station.

Between Smith's and Glossop's sidings, the track was crossed by a tramway owned by the British Moss Litter Company and used for conveying peat. The tramway had been built in 1896, and a ground frame was installed to control conflicting train movements. The NER proposed that the tramway should be cut in two, with each half extended westwards, to run alongside Smith's siding and a new siding opposite it on the other side of the main line, but this was rejected. In 1905 they proposed a tunnel under their line, with gradients on the tramway not exceeding 1 in 20 on both sides. Although agreements were drawn up, the plan does not appear to have been implemented. The tramway was of 3 ft (914 mm) narrow gauge, was about 3 miles (4.8 km) long, and used a steam locomotive. It served Old Goole Mill, although further details of either the mill or the locomotive have not been found. Although the mill closed soon after 1902, it was used for storing peat until 1914, and the tracks were not lifted until many years later. In 1903, some twelve trains per day crossed over the Axholme Joint Railway on the tramway.

The bridge over Swinefleet Warping Drain was the subject of an unusual request from Colonel Thompson in 1906, who asked permission for 16 of his female potato pickers to cross it to reach their place of work. To access it, they would need to walk through the goods yard and along the main line, but it would save them having to walk much further each day. The request was granted, provided that the Colonel indemnified the railway against any claims made if the ladies were involved in an accident.

At Reedness, the Fockerby Branch turned to the north, and the Axholme Light Railway route swung to the south. Reedness Junction had a brick-built water tower, a house for the station master, and sidings to the north, accessible from the Fockerby Branch. It was some 3 miles (4.8 km) from the village centre of Swinefleet, and 4 miles (6.4 km) from Reedness village. The Branch was 5.7 miles (9.2 km) long. Blackers siding and Whitgift siding were passed before the line reached Eastoft station, which was 1.5 miles (2.4 km) north of the village centre. There were two sidings to the north. After crossing the road beside the Adlingfleet Drain, the proposed line to Adlinfleet would have continued beside the drain, but the line to Fockerby as built turned to the south-east. It passed Boltgate siding to reach Luddington station, with two sidings to the south, but still 0.75 miles (1.21 km) from the village. Next came Pindar's siding, after which the line curved to the north to reach Fockerby, where there were two sidings and a run-around loop.

Returning to Reedness Junction, the line started as the Axholme Light Railway ran from there to Haxey. After Moor's Farm siding, Peat Moss Works siding, which serviced Swinefleet Peat Works, and Spilman's siding, the line reached Crowle. Here there was a passing loop and three sidings to the west. To the south of the station was Ealand Depot, with two sidings, which were added after representations were made by farmers. Beyond, the line rose on an embankment to Crowle swing bridge, crossing three brick arches over a road and a drain, a 52-foot (16 m) girder bridge over the Scunthorpe to Doncaster main line, and another brick arch as it approached. The main girders were 104 feet (32 m) long, and the bridge was built by the Cleveland Bridge & Engineering Company of Darlington. To the south of it was a twelve-arched viaduct known as Crowle Arches, which crossed the Hatfield Waste Drain, the North Engine Drain, the River Torne and the A18 road, and beyond that, another nine-arched viaduct spanning the South Engine Drain and the Folly Drain, beyond which the railway started to descend to return to ground level.

Hagg Lane siding, near the village of Belton, was next, from where John Blether agreed to forward 2,500 tons per year. Using Army-surplus equipment from the First World War, he built 1.25 miles (2.0 km) of 2 ft (610 mm) gauge tramway in 1920 to bring produce from his farm to the sidings. The length of track was gradually extended to 3 miles (4.8 km), and the wagons were pulled by horses. Usage declined after the Second World War, and the tramway was closed in 1953. Belton station had a passing loop, with three sidings and a loading dock, which was used for sugar-beet traffic. The station was regularly used by the photographer J. Bottomley in the 1920s, who would arrive with his photographic caravan loaded on a truck, and recorded life in the district.

A brickworks and clay pit were served by the next siding. It was not constructed until 1936, and continued in use until the line closed. The line rose on an embankment to cross the A161 road, and then entered a cutting, where it was joined by the Hatfield Moors branch, the two running parallel for some 240 yards (220 m) before the cutting became an embankment, and they joined near Epworth station. Epworth had a passing loop and sidings to the east, with the track crossing the High Street on a brick bridge to the south of the station.

Next came Burnham Lane siding, and then a high embankment, pierced by two brick bridges, which were wide enough for double track, although they only ever carried a single track, followed by another deep cutting. Haxey station had a passing loop and three sidings. It was originally called Haxey Central, and then Haxey Town AJR, and eventually became Haxey Town. The line continued on an embankment, crossed Ferry Drain and Warping Drain by a brick bridge, and turned to the south-east to reach the terminus at Haxey Junction Station. The adjacent station on the Great Northern and Great Eastern Joint Railway line between Doncaster and Gainsborough, to which it was connected by a line which required two reversals, was called Haxey and Epworth.

Marshland Junction to Haxey was a distance of 17.15 miles (27.60 km), although working timetables normally showed the distance from Goole, which was 19.53 miles (31.43 km) from Haxey. The freight-only branch from Epworth to Hatfield Moors was 5.13 miles (8.26 km) long.

== Motive power ==
During the construction of the two railways, three contractors locomotives worked on the Goole and Marshland Railway, and four on the Isle of Axholme Light Railway. All were built by the Manning Wardle company in Leeds. The first, named Margaret, was an 0-4-0 saddle tank with outside cylinders, while the remainder, built to four different designs, were 0-6-0 saddle tanks with inside cylinders. None were owned by the two railways, and five of them were auctioned at a sale of contractors' plant held at Crowle Wharf in October 1904.

Once the contractors' locomotives ceased working on the line, locomotives were supplied from Goole shed, and were usually Barton Wright 0-6-2 side tanks or Barton Wright 0-6-0 goods engines with tenders. The locomotives took their name from William Barton Wright, who was the chief mechanical engineer for the Lancashire and Yorkshire Railway at the time they were introduced. They were designed and built by Kitson and Company in Leeds. Although classified as goods engines, the 0-6-0 locomotives were employed on both goods and passenger services. They continued to work on the line until the early 1960s. Most of the 0-6-2s had been withdrawn by 1914, and their duties were performed by Aspinall 2-4-2 side tanks.

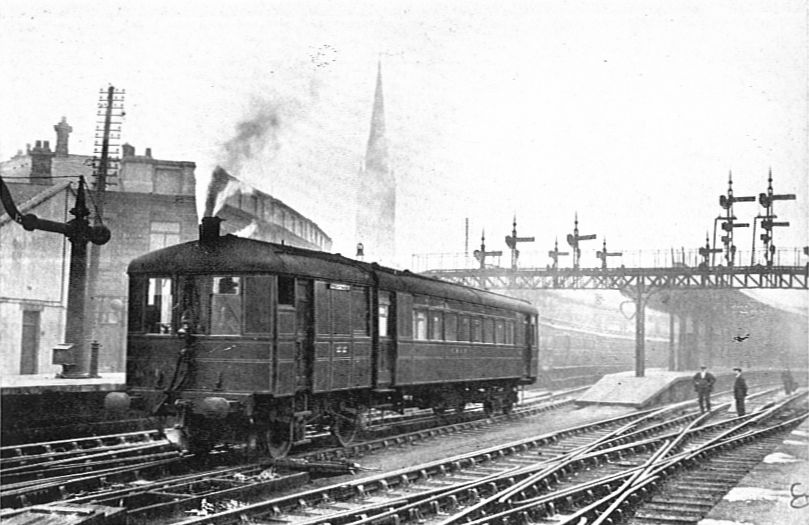
A Sentinel-Cammell steam railcar of the same type as the one which worked on the Axholme Joint Railway.

In 1907, the company looked at using petrol-electric autocars for the passenger services, but were advised that they would not be economic, as conventional trains would still be required on Wednesdays and Saturdays to cope with the volume of traffic. However, in July 1926 they conducted trials with a Sentinel-Cammell steam railcar, which was borrowed from the London and North Eastern Railway (LNER). The London, Midland and Scottish Railway (LMS), who had absorbed the Lancashire and Yorkshire Railway, bought 13 steam railcars in 1926 and 1927, one of which was allocated to Goole shed for work on the Axholme Joint Railway. A similar vehicle was ordered in February 1930 specifically for the railway, and entered service in December. The steam power unit was built by the Sentinel Waggon Works in Shrewsbury, and the bodywork was built at Nottingham, at the former works of Cammell Laird, by then part of the Metropolitan-Cammell Carriage, Wagon and Finance Company. Before passenger services were withdrawn in 1933, it ran 53,786 miles (86,560 km), working two return trips from Goole to Haxey Junction on weekdays, three on Wednesdays, and five on Saturdays. It was then sold to the LNER and continued in use until 1944.

From 1947, Ivatt 2-6-0 lightweight tender locomotives were allocated to Goole shed, and were soon operating on the Axholme Joint Railway. The last two Barton Wright 0-6-0 locomotives left Goole shed in December 1950 for Wakefield and all of the seven Ivatt locomotives are thought to have worked on the line. They were popular with the crews, as the tender was fitted with a back sheet for the cab, and was low enough to provide good visibility when running tender-first across the moors on the return journey to Goole. In 1957 they were briefly replaced by four elderly J10 0-6-0 tender engines, transferred from Liverpool, but all were withdrawn in 1958. Small diesel shunters were allocated to Goole shed in 1960, for use in the docks, but were also used on the Axholme Joint Railway. Only one of the Ivatt 2-6-0 locomotives was left at Goole by mid-1962.

Although there were no passenger services after 1933, occasional rail tours ran along the line. The last passenger train was a 4-car diesel multiple unit, hired by the North Axholme Secondary School at Crowle on 1 April 1965. It left Goole at 11:30 am, carrying 184 pupils, members of staff, invited guests and the press. Passing through Reedness Junction, the train ran to Fockerby, where it was met by pupils from Garthorpe Primary School. It then returned to Reedness, and followed the route through Crowle to Epworth, by then the terminus. It returned to Ealand siding, where some of the passengers left the train, and the rest detrained at Crowle. The average speed for the 32.6-mile (52.5 km) journey was 8.1 miles per hour (13.0 km/h).

== Points of interest ==
Point	Coordinates (Links to map resources)	OS Grid Ref	Notes
Marshland Junction	53.6759°N 0.9084°W	SE722204	with North Eastern Railway
Tramway crossing	53.6619°N 0.8834°W	SE738189	east of Smiths siding
Reedness Junction	53.6529°N 0.8496°W	SE761179	start of Fockerby Branch
Eastoft station	53.6553°N 0.7775°W	SE808183	
Luddington station	53.6492°N 0.7525°W	SE825176	
Fockerby station	53.6607°N 0.7262°W	SE842189	terminus
Swinefleet Peat Works siding	53.6416°N 0.8362°W	SE770167	3-ft gauge peat railways
Crowle station	53.6124°N 0.8305°W	SE774135	
Ealand Depot	53.5991°N 0.8125°W	SE786120	used until 1970
Crowle swing bridge	53.5885°N 0.8073°W	SE790108	
Crowle arches (12-arch viaduct)	53.5831°N 0.8092°W	SE789102	Blown up in 1981
9-arch viaduct	53.5787°N 0.8094°W	SE789097	extant
Hagg Lane siding	53.5714°N 0.8085°W	SE790089	Blether's 2-ft gauge tramway
Belton station	53.5563°N 0.8127°W	SE787072	
Hatfield Moor Branch	53.5368°N 0.8262°W	SE778051	
Epworth station	53.5310°N 0.8318°W	SE775044	
Haxey Town station	53.4885°N 0.8372°W	SK772997	
Haxey Junction station	53.4667°N 0.8427°W	SK769972	with GN & GE Railway
Sandtoft Goods station	53.5563°N 0.8814°W	SE741072	
Hatfield Moor Goods station	53.5676°N 0.9239°W	SE713084	3-ft gauge peat railways

== Bibliography ==
- Booth, A.J. (1998). Peat Railways of Thorne and Hatfield Moors. Industrial Railway Society. ISBN 1-901556-04-2.
- Judge, C.W. (1994). The Axholme Joint Railway. Oakwood Press. ISBN 978-0-85361-441-8.
- Nicholson (2006). Nicholson Guides Vol 6: Nottingham, York and the North East. Harper Collins. ISBN 978-0-00-721114-2.
- Rotherham, Ian D. (2010). Yorkshire's Forgotten Fenlands. Wharncliffe Books. ISBN 978-1-845631-31-4.
