= Haxey Junction railway station =

Former railway station in England

Haxey Junction
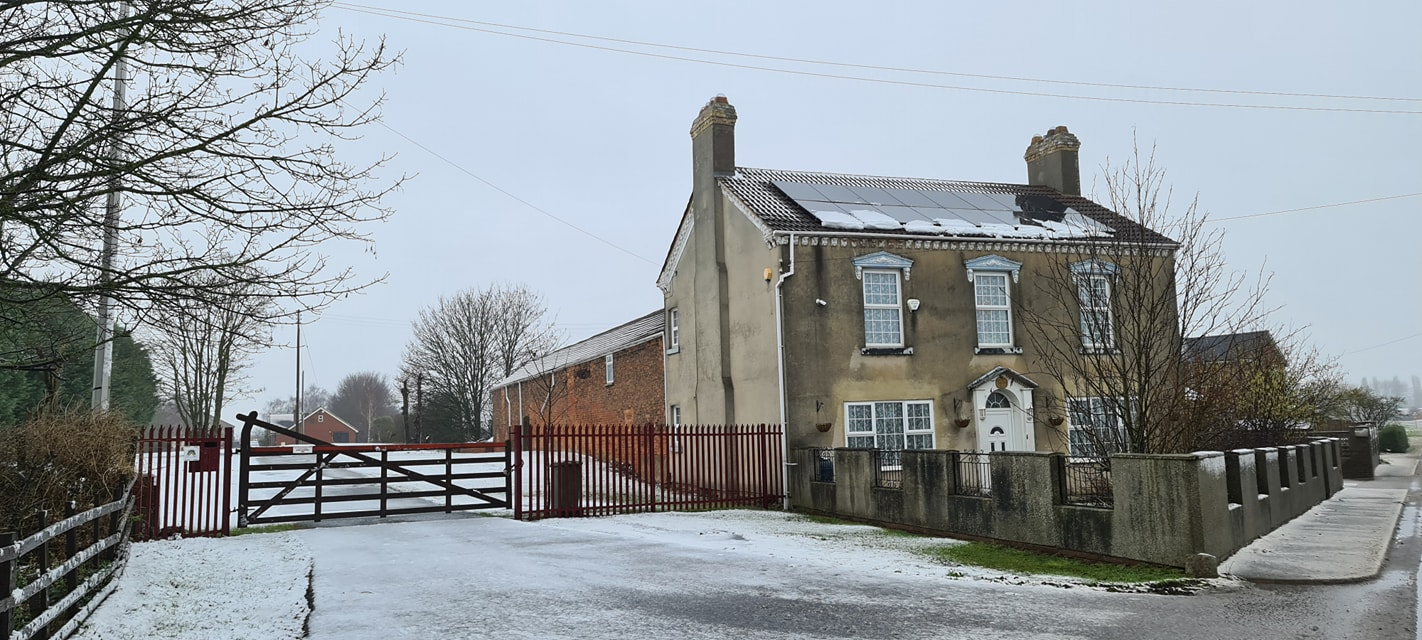

General information
- Location: Haxey, North Lincolnshire; England
- Coordinates: 53.4674°N 0.8432°W
- Grid reference: SK769973

Other information
- Status: Disused

History
- Original company: Axholme Joint Railway
- Pre-grouping: Axholme Joint Railway
- Post-grouping: Axholme Joint Railway

Key dates
- 2 January 1905: Station opened
- 17 July 1933: Station closed
Location

Haxey Junction railway station was a station south of the town of Haxey, on the Isle of Axholme in Lincolnshire, England. It was the terminus of the Axholme Joint Railway which ran from Marshland Junction near Goole, and was adjacent to Haxey and Epworth station on the Great Northern and Great Eastern Joint Railway line which ran from Doncaster to Lincoln. Both stations are now closed, although the former Great Northern and Great Eastern Joint Railway line is still operational.

The line from Haxey Junction to Epworth was opened for goods traffic on 14 November 1904, and for passengers on 2 January 1905, following completion of work recommended by the Board of Trade. It was originally started by the Isle of Axholme Light Railway in 1899, but became part of the Axholme Joint Railway in January 1903, before construction was completed. Passenger services ceased in 1933 but freight continued until closure on 1 February 1956, although the line north of Epworth to Marshland Junction and Goole remained open for freight until 5 April 1965.

Preceding station	Disused railways	Following station
Haxey Town	Axholme Joint Railway	Terminus

== Bibliography ==
- Judge, C.W. (1994). The Axholme Joint Railway. Oakwood Press. ISBN 978-0-85361-441-8.
