= Fockerby railway station =

Railway station in Fockerby, Lincolnshire, England

Fockerby
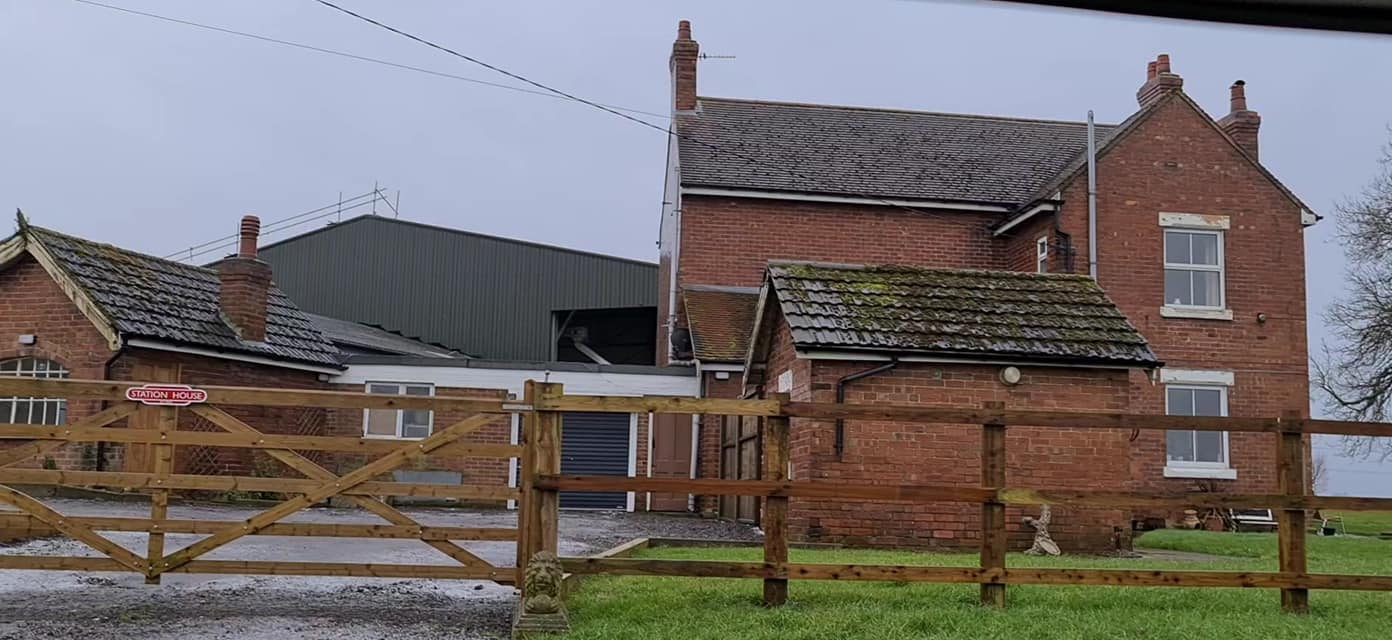
- Fockerby station in 2021

General information
- Location: Fockerby, Lincolnshire; England
- Coordinates: 53.6608°N 0.7264°W

Other information
- Status: Disused

History
- Original company: Axholme Light Railway
- Pre-grouping: Axholme Joint Railway
- Post-grouping: Joint LMS and LNER

Key dates
- 10 August 1903: opened
- 17 July 1933: closed
Location

Fockerby railway station was a station in Fockerby, Lincolnshire. It served as the terminus of a branch of the Axholme Joint Railway. It is now closed.

The station opened with the line on 10 August 1903, and closed with the end of passenger services on 17 July 1933.

== Route ==
Preceding station	Disused railways	Following station
Luddington	Axholme Joint Railway	Terminus
