= Epworth railway station =

Station in Epworth, Lincolnshire

Coordinates: 53.5314°N 0.8316°W

Epworth
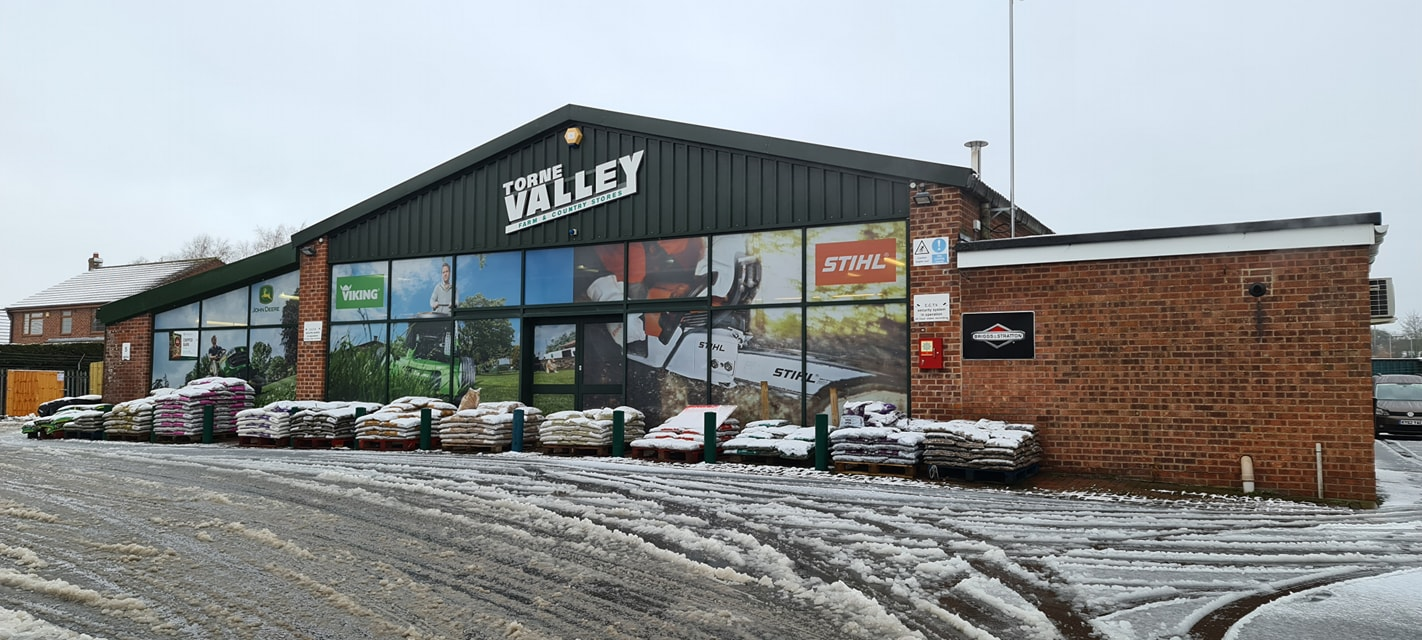
- Site of Epworth station in 2021

General information
- Location: England

Other information
- Status: Disused

History
- Original company: Axholme Joint Railway
- Pre-grouping: Axholme Joint Railway
- Post-grouping: Axholme Joint Railway

Key dates
- 2 January 1905: Opened
- 17 July 1933: Closed
Location

Epworth railway station was a station that served the town of Epworth, on the Isle of Axholme in Lincolnshire, England.

Preceding station	Disused railways	Following station
Belton	Axholme Joint Railway	Haxey Town
