= Sandtoft, Lincolnshire =

Hamlet in Lincolnshire, England

Coordinates: 53.564010°N 0.874245°W

Sandtoft
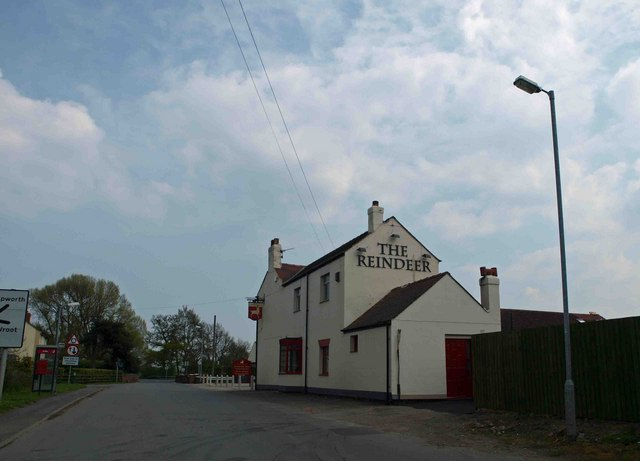
- The Reindeer Inn, Sandtoft

- Location within Lincolnshire
- OS grid reference: SE746080
  - London: 150 mi (240 km) S
- Civil parish: Belton
- Unitary authority: North Lincolnshire
- Ceremonial county: Lincolnshire
- Region: Yorkshire and the Humber
- Country: England
- Sovereign state: United Kingdom
- Post town: Doncaster
- Postcode district: DN8
- Dialling code: 01724
- Police: Humberside
- Fire: Humberside
- Ambulance: East Midlands
- UK Parliament: Doncaster East and the Isle of Axholme
- Website: Belton Parish Council

Sandtoft is a hamlet in the civil parish of Belton, North Lincolnshire, England.

Sandtoft is in Hatfield Chase on the Isle of Axholme, 3 miles (5 km) north-west from Epworth. The village was served by the Isle of Axholme Joint Railway with a goods station serving the former RAF airfield.

In the Middle Ages the Benedictine St Mary's Abbey, York, had a cell here of a single monk, sometimes referred to as Sandtoft Priory. It was founded by Roger de Mowbray sometime between 1147 and 1186 and dissolved around 1291. No physical remains have been discovered.

RAF Sandtoft was an RAF Bomber Command airfield. It opened in April 1944, closed in November 1945 and was sold for civilian uses in 1955. Today part of the site is Sandtoft Airfield and The Trolleybus Museum at Sandtoft, Europe's largest trolleybus museum, is on another part.

Sandtoft and nearby Epworth, Lincolnshire were centres of unrest during the 17th draining of The Fens.
