= Listed buildings in Willerby, East Riding of Yorkshire =

Willerby is a civil parish in the county of the East Riding of Yorkshire, England. It contains three listed buildings that are recorded in the National Heritage List for England. Of these, one is listed at Grade II*, the middle of the three grades, and the others are at Grade II, the lowest grade. The parish contains the village of Willerby and the surrounding countryside, and the listed buildings consist of a farmhouse and two houses.

== Key ==
Grade	Criteria
II*	Particularly important buildings of more than special interest
II	Buildings of national importance and special interest

== Buildings ==
Name and location	Photograph	Date	Notes	Grade
Haltemprice Priory Farm; 53.76468°N 0.42081°W		Late 15th to early 16th century	The farmhouse, which incorporates material from Haltemprice Priory, was at one time derelict, and it ,has been restored. It is in red brick, with stone dressings, on a partial plinth, with quoins, and a pantile roof with tumbled-in brick to the raised gables. There are two storeys, a range of four bays, a projecting wing and a tower. The entrance has a four-centred arch, above which is a heraldic shield and a hood mould.	II*
Willerby Hall; 53.76268°N 0.44871°W		Late 17th century (probable)	The house, later divided into flats, is in red brick, with stone dressings, rusticated quoins, a moulded cornice, and a double-span pantile roof with shaped gables. There are two storeys and five bays, the middle bay projecting under a shaped gable with a pediment. The doorway has pilasters, panelled reveals and a soffit, a fanlight with radial glazing, and an open pediment. The windows are sashes under flat gauged brick arches with raised keystones, and there are two pedimented roof dormers. To the left is a later extension with two storeys and three bays containing sash windows under segmental brick arches.	II
The Beeches; 53.76196°N 0.44975°W		c. 1760	The house, which has been extended, is in stone on the front and brick elsewhere, with quoins, a floor band, a moulded eaves cornice and a blocking course, and a pantile roof with raised coped gables. There are two storeys and five bays, the middle bay projecting under a pediment. In the centre is a Doric porch with a triglyph frieze and a dentilled pediment. The windows are sashes, the window above the porch in an eared and shouldered architrave, and the others under flat stone arches with projecting keystones. On the left return is a two-storey canted bay window.	II
