= Scottish Tramway and Transport Society =

Tram railway society in Scotland

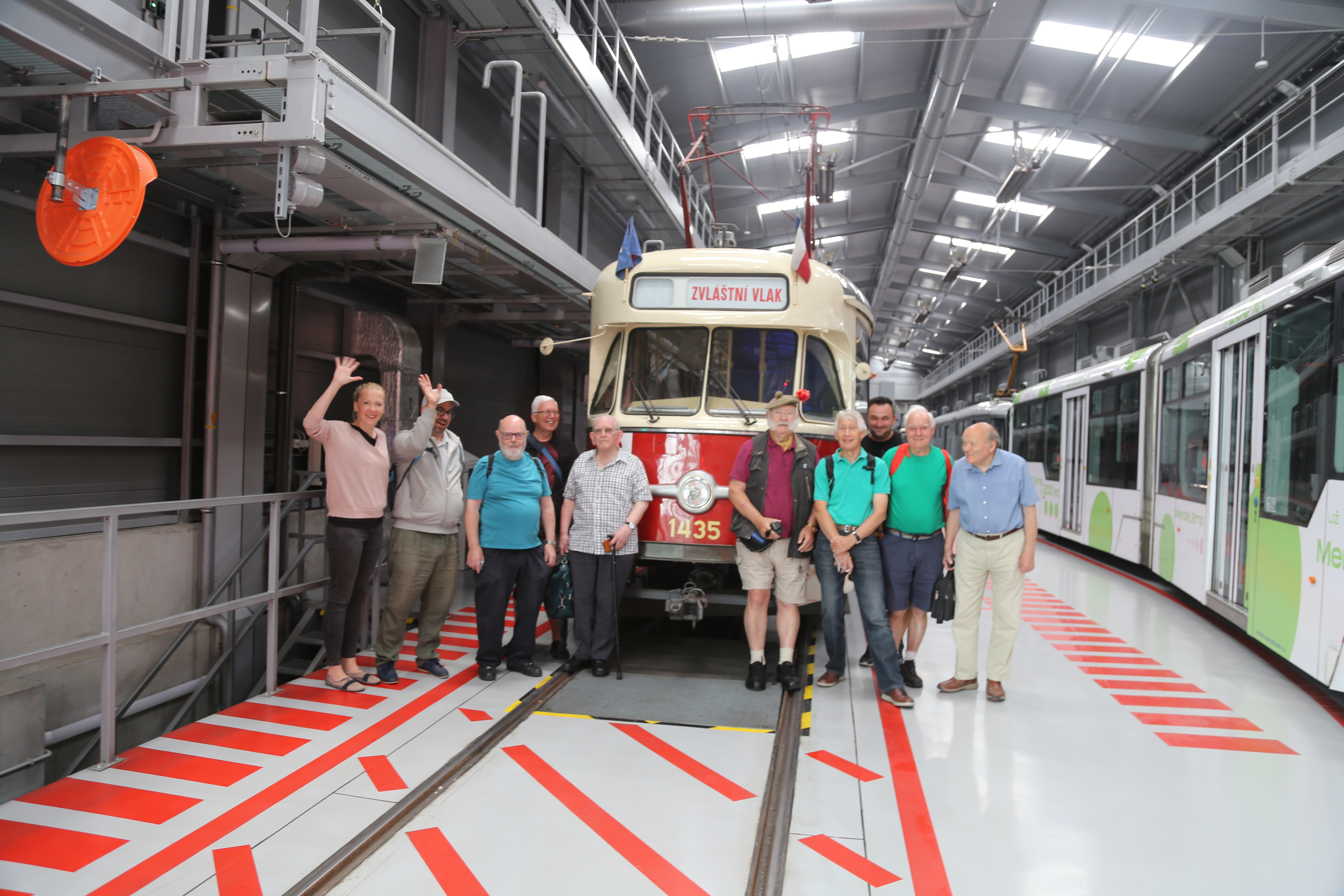
Society members in Brno in Pisárky depot

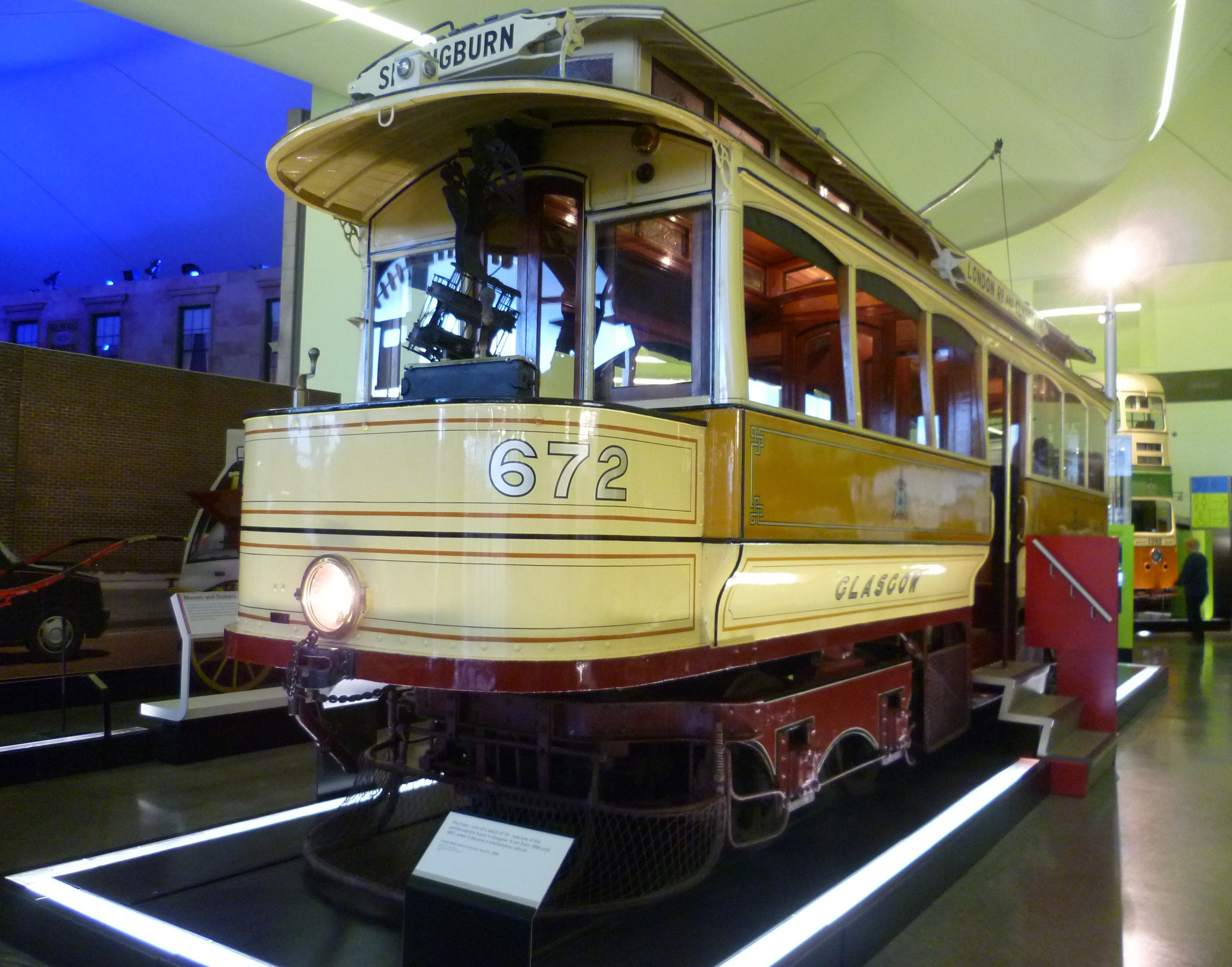
Glasgow tram in the Riverside Museum

The Scottish Tramway and Transport Society was founded on 27 June 1951 and was the first society in the United Kingdom dedicated to tramway retention and preservation. Until 1983 it was known as the Scottish Tramway Museum Society. The Society was originally formed by tramway enthusiasts, mainly living in the Glasgow area, with a view to preserve a Glasgow "Room and Kitchen" type single deck tramcar No. 672 of 1898 (which is now preserved in the city's Riverside Museum). The Society was less successful in attempting to preserve an Aberdeen tram. Tram 73 was Aberdeen's last double deck tram with an upper-deck balcony; it was stored for two years until a lack of resources led to its scrapping in 1956.

The closure of Scotland's last tramway (Glasgow in 1962) led to the Society preserving several tramcars, including some in working order at the National Tramway Museum at Crich, near Matlock, Derbyshire. In 1963 the Society published the first edition of its magazine "Scottish Tramlines" which was later renamed "Scottish Transport" - covering all aspects of past and present public transport in Scotland including tramway preservation. The Society has also published many other books and booklets of interest to transport enthusiasts, profits from which have largely been donated to the National Tramway Museum for the upkeep of its fleet of historic Scottish tramcars.

In the 1980s the Society started campaigning for the introduction of modern tram systems in Scotland. Since 2008 work on building a new tram line in Edinburgh has been underway and, following extensive delays and contractual disputes, opened 31 May 2014. The completion of this project is the fulfilment of one of the Society's major ambitions.

== Scottish Transport ==
The society's magazine, Scottish Transport, has been published for over fifty years. The current issue and back issues are available on the society's website. the society's website

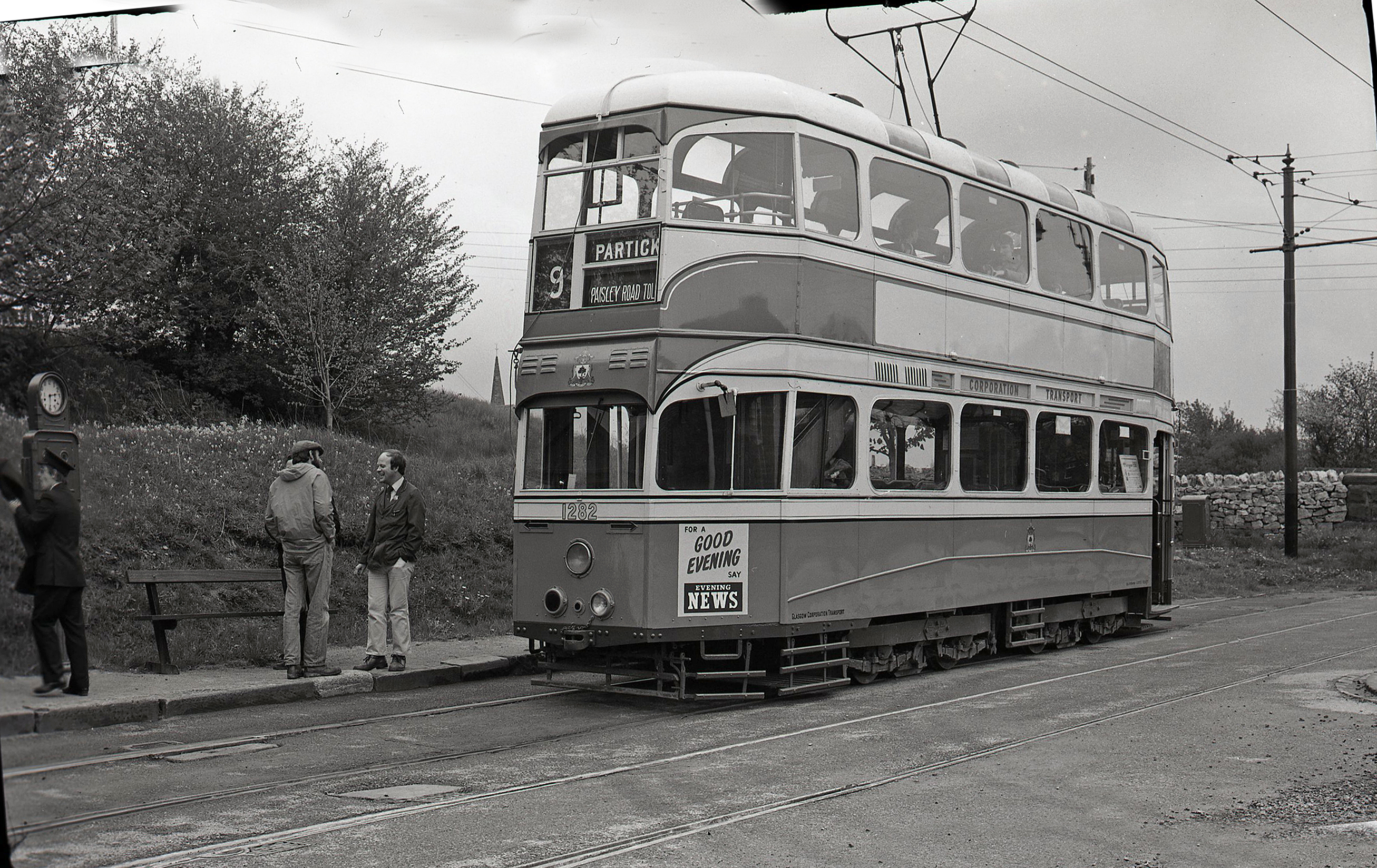
Glasgow Tram 1282 at the National Tramway Museum

== See also ==
Former major municipal tramways in Scotland:

- Aberdeen Corporation Tramways (closed in 1958)
- Dundee Corporation Tramways (closed in 1956)
- Edinburgh Corporation Tramways (closed in 1956)
- Glasgow Corporation Tramways (closed in 1962)

Museums:

- Glasgow Museum of Transport (now Riverside Museum)
- Summerlee Heritage Park
- The Trolleybus Museum at Sandtoft
- National Tramway Museum

Other links:

- Glasgow Subway
- Light Rail Transit Association
- List of Tramways in Scotland
- Proposals for new tram lines in Edinburgh
- Strathclyde Partnership for Transport
- Trams
- Trams in Europe
- Transport Scotland
- Trolleybuses in Glasgow (1949–1967)
