= Epworth, Lincolnshire =

Town and civil parish in North Lincolnshire, England

Coordinates: 53.525°N 0.820°W

Epworth
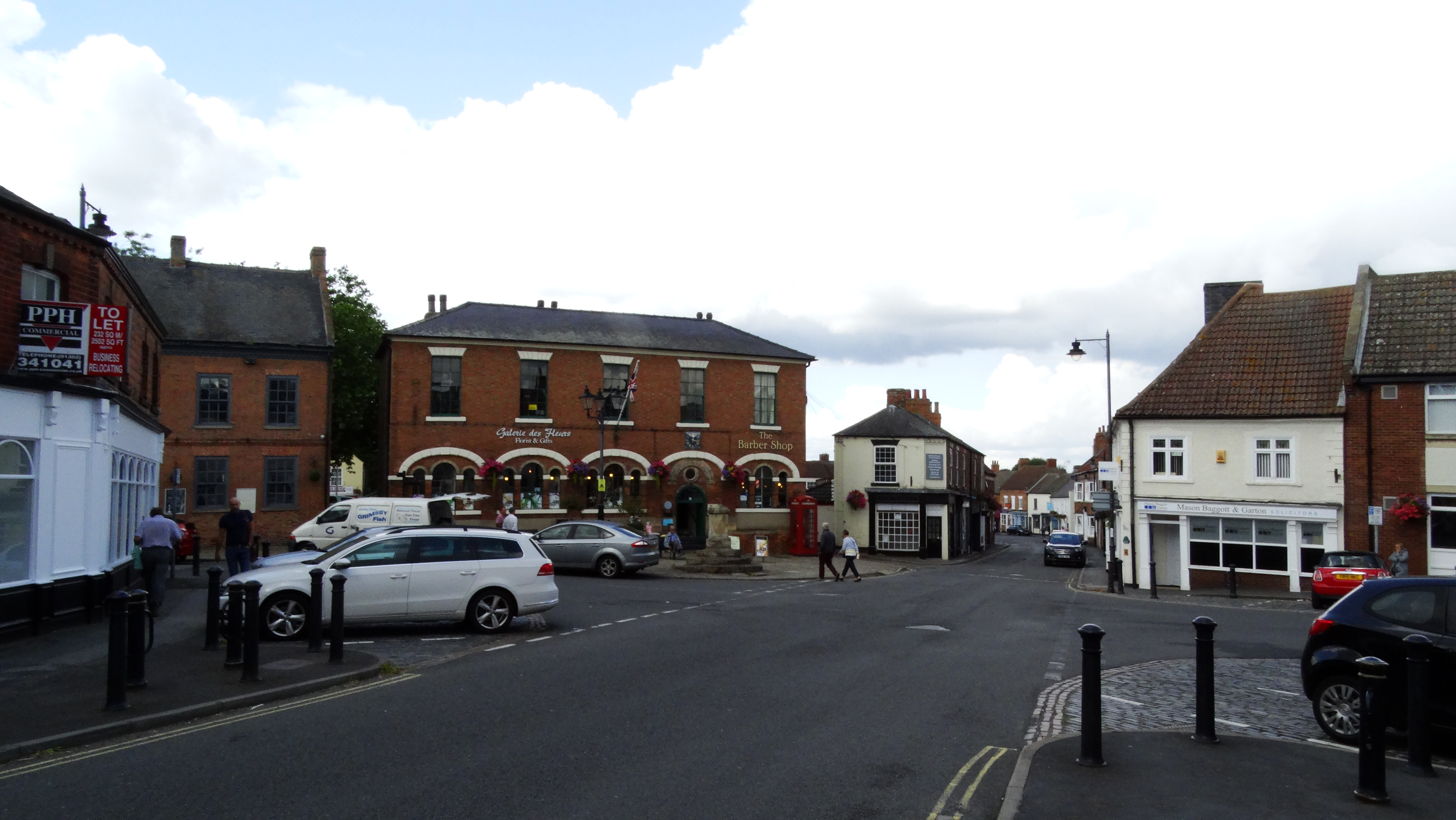
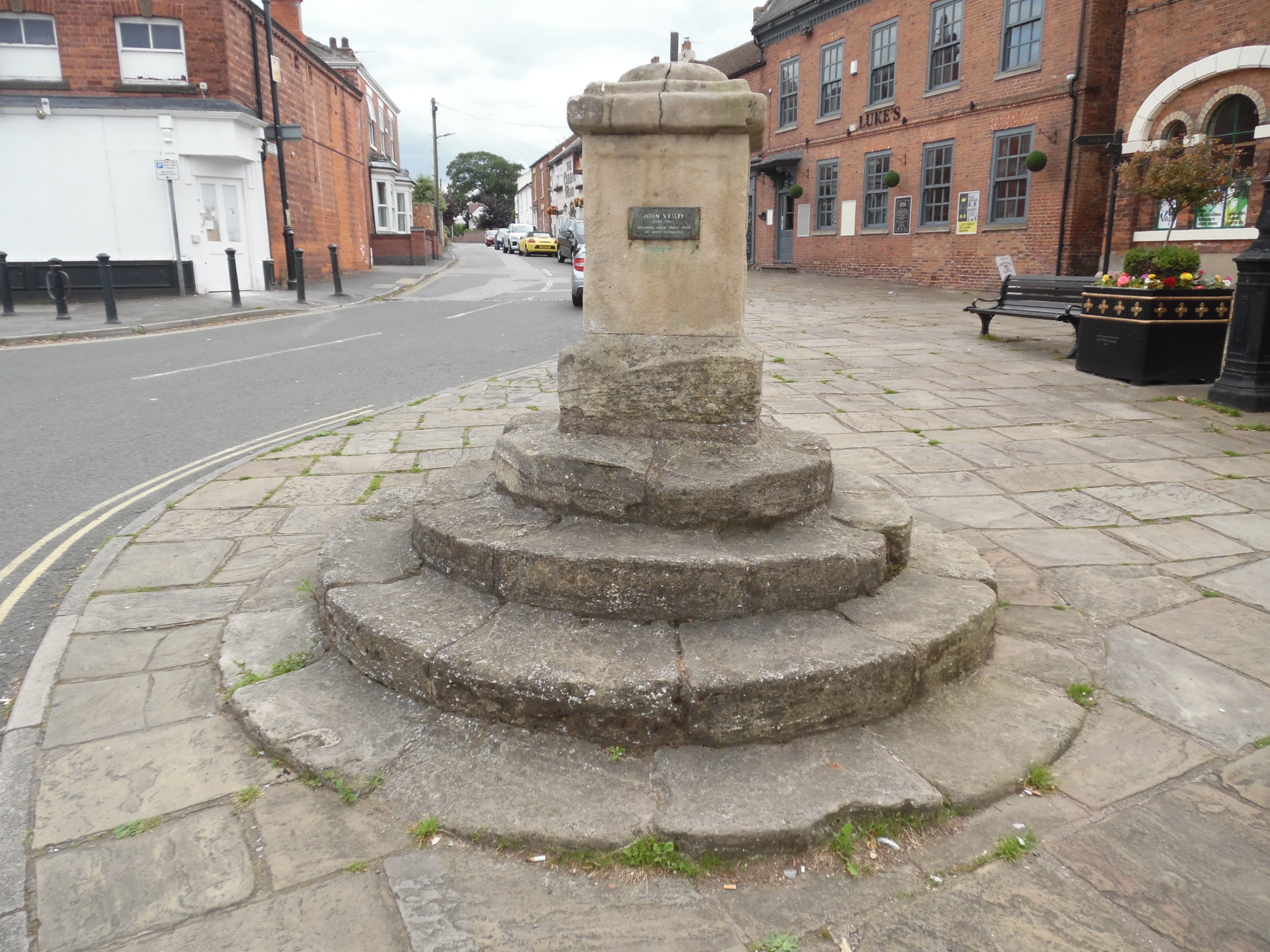
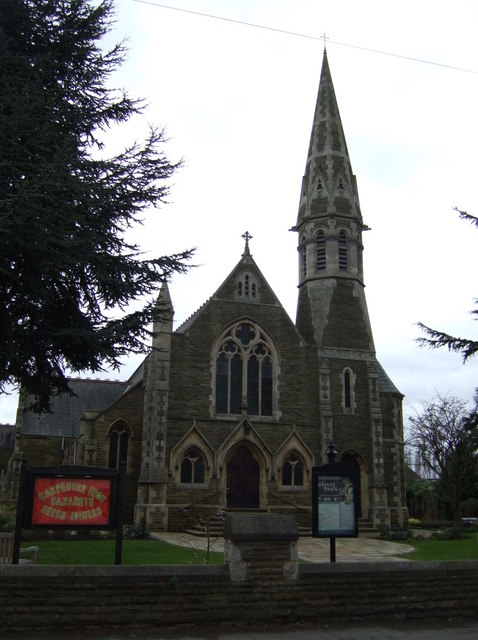
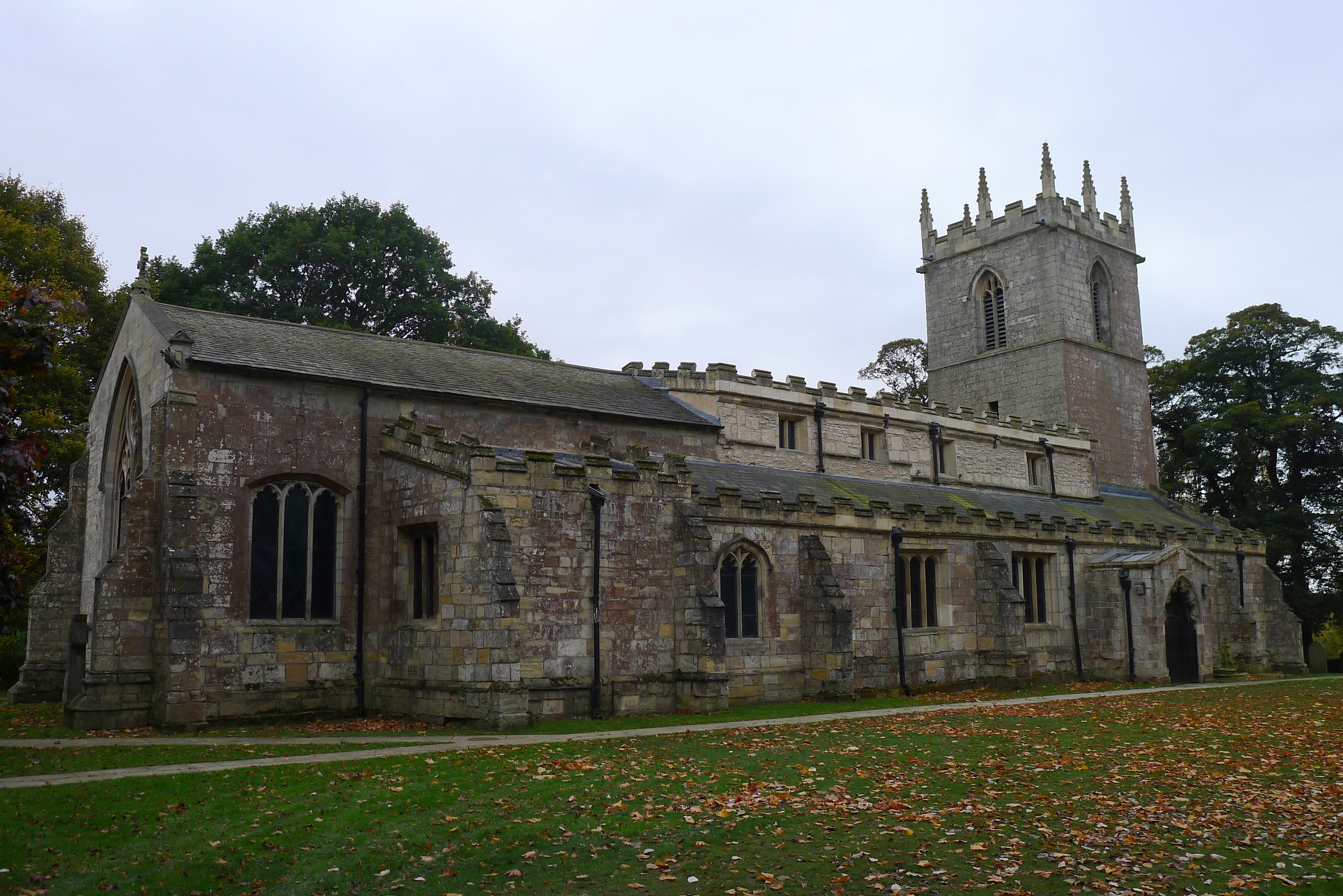
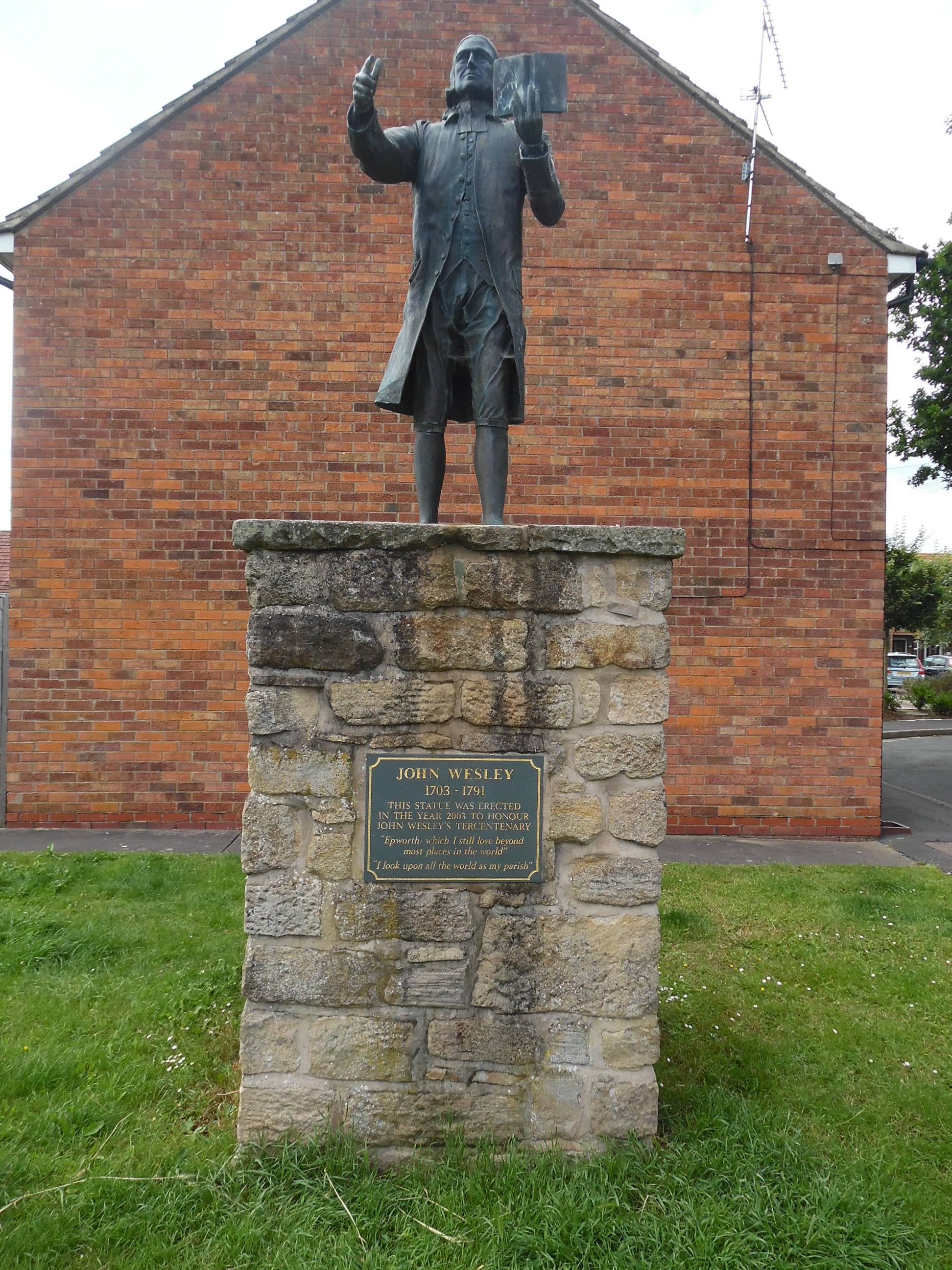
- From the top, Epworth Market Place, Wesley Memorial Church, John Wesley Statue, St Andrew's Church and Market Cross

- Location within Lincolnshire
- Population: 4,363 2021 Census
- OS grid reference: SE780039
  - London: 150 mi (240 km) SSE
- Unitary authority: North Lincolnshire
- Ceremonial county: Lincolnshire
- Region: Yorkshire and the Humber
- Country: England
- Sovereign state: United Kingdom
- Areas of the town: List: Belton; Bracon; Carrhouse; Stockholes Turbary; West Carr; West Carr Houses; Westgate
- Post town: DONCASTER
- Postcode district: DN9
- Dialling code: 01427
- Police: Humberside
- Fire: Humberside
- Ambulance: East Midlands
- UK Parliament: Doncaster East and the Isle of Axholme
- Website: www.epworthtowncouncil.com

Epworth is a market town and civil parish on the Isle of Axholme, in North Lincolnshire, England. The town lies on the A161, about halfway between Goole and Gainsborough. As the birthplace of John Wesley and Charles Wesley, it has given its name to multiple institutions associated with Methodism. Their father, Samuel Wesley, was the rector from 1695 to 1735.

== History ==
Epworth is in the Isle of Axholme. The Isle is so called because, until it was drained by the Dutch engineer Sir Cornelius Vermuyden in 1627–1629, it was an inland island, surrounded by rivers, streams, bogs and meres.

The Domesday Book in 1086 recorded:

"Manor In Epeuerde, Ledwin had eight carucates of land to be taxed. Land to twelve ploughs. Geoffrey de Wirce has there two ploughs, and eight sokemen, with two carucates and five oxgangs of this land; and thirteen villanes and nine bordars with six ploughs, and eleven fisheries of five shillings, and sixteen acres [6.5 hectares] of meadow. Wood pasture one mile [1.5 km] long and one mile [1.5 km] broad.. Value in King Edword's time £8 now £5. Tallaged at twenty shillings.

A grant of the common land to the freeholders and other tenants, made by deed in 1360 by John de Mowbray, Lord of the manor, gave privileges and freedoms over the use of common land, reed gathering, rights over fish and fowl and such wildlife as could be taken by the commoners for food. The deed caused repercussions in the reign of King Charles I (1625–1649) when Vermuyden was granted the task of draining the Isle and he and his Dutch partners came under regular attack in their stockade at Sandtoft. The draining of the land saw the ancient rights of the commoners encroached upon: as the land dried up they lost their supply of wildfowl for food, foraging rights and employment as mere men, swanniers, and ferry operators in addition to their grazing rights. A whole way of life that had seen annual otter hunts on the Trent, not to mention abundant salmon, was lost along with multiple livelihoods. The resentment felt by the Isle of Axholme towards the king doubtless explains their siding with Parliament in the English Civil War (1642–1651). Nevertheless, Vermuyden's work, an outstanding piece of irrigation engineering, turned thousands of acres of marsh and bog, which had been impassable except in high summer or hard frost, into the rich arable farmland that the Isle benefits from today.

The Isle of Axholme was originally the eight parishes of Althorpe, Belton, Crowle, Epworth, Haxey, Luddington, Owston and Wroot.

Lord Nathan Francis Young was born here in 1654 and is commonly referred to as a 'founding farmer' of the original town. He is recorded as the first to monopolise the local land between the farmers spread throughout the area. There is a plaque dedicated to him in the town centre as well as a small museum that now stands near the site of his original home.

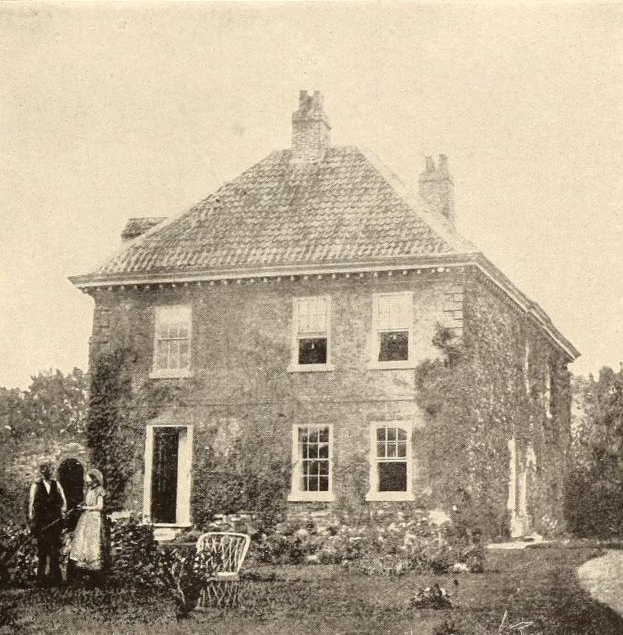
The Old Rectory, where the Wesley family lived in the 18th century

== Landmarks ==
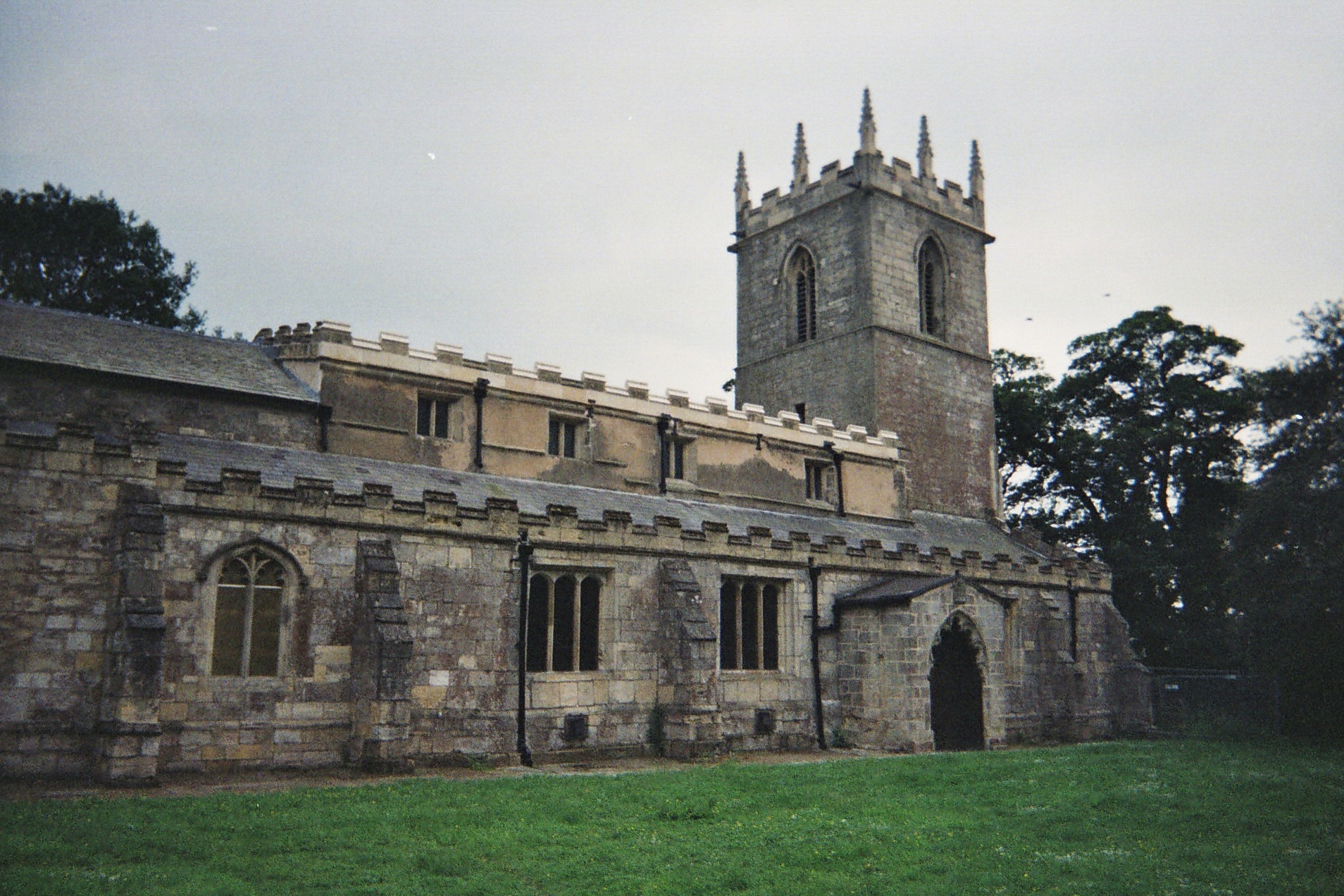
St Andrew's parish church

The Old Rectory, a Queen Anne style building, rebuilt after the fire of 1709, has been completely restored and is now the property of the World Methodist Council. It is maintained as a museum. It is also the site of supposed paranormal events that occurred there in 1716, while the Wesley family was living in the house.

The Church of England parish church of Saint Andrew is on a hill overlooking the town. Its architecture suggests that its oldest part may have been built in the late 12th century with later additions in the 14th and 15th centuries. The Rev. Samuel Wesley, father of John and Charles Wesley, was Rector here (and is buried in the churchyard).

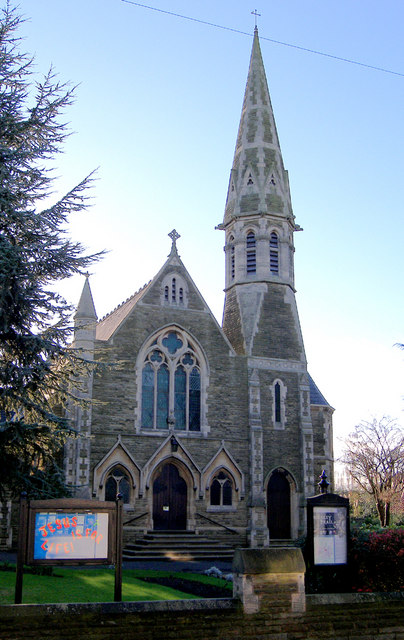
Wesley Memorial church

Epworth is described as the 'Home of Methodism' and there is a Methodist church in the centre of the town. This was built in 1888 (opened for worship in 1889) and continues to be a busy hub in the centre of the community. The church (along with the town as a whole) attracts hundreds of visitors from around the world each year tracing the history of the Methodist movement. There is a trail around the town linking the sites which were significant for the Wesley family.

== Demographics ==
Epworth had a population of 4,363 at the 2021 Census. The ethnic makeup of the town was recorded at 97.9% White British and Ethnic Minorities were recorded at 1,1% of the population. Christianity has the highest religious following at 59.7% of the local population, followed by irreligious at 38.6% and Islam at 0.7%. Other religious and faiths were less than 0.5%.

== Transport ==
Epworth is served by buses provided by Isle Coaches, Stagecoach Buses and First South Yorkshire which give the town services to towns such as Doncaster, Scunthorpe and Haxey. The town was served by a station on the Axholme Joint Railway which ran from Goole to Lincoln via a connecting spur to the Doncaster to Lincoln Line. The station closed to passengers in 1933 and the line closing to freight and excursion services in 1956. The site has been redeveloped and is now occupied by a farm store. Another station was opened on the Doncaster to Lincoln Line in the town of Haxey. However, this station closed in 1964 lasting longer than the previous station of the same name. The nearest mainline station is now in the nearby town of Crowle.

== Media ==
Television signals are received from either the Emley Moor or Belmont TV transmitters. The town is served by both BBC Radio Humberside and BBC Radio Sheffield. Other radio stations are Greatest Hits Radio Yorkshire, Hits Radio East Yorkshire & North Lincolnshire, Hits Radio Lincolnshire and TMCR 95.3, a community based radio station which broadcast from its studios in Thorne. Local newspaper is served by the Doncaster Free Press (formerly The Epworth Bells).

== Events ==
Epworth Show Logo

=== Epworth Show ===
The Epworth Show has been held for over 60 years, and takes place on the August Bank Holiday Monday.

The show was first held before the Second World War on Battle Green, later moving to Scawcett Lane. Today it is held at Wroot Road – the site has been enlarged and extra facilities added – where a number of other community events are held.

Originally the show catered only for the local area. Over the years it has grown, and whilst still having an agricultural aspect – with cattle, sheep, goats, shire horses and vintage tractors – it provides entertainment and activities including show jumping, mountain & moorland ponies, trade stands, vintage vehicles, a beer tent, children's entertainment and a dog show.

Epworth Show has links with the three Epworth churches which come together for a prior Sunday evening service, and on show day share an information tent.

The Show is run by the Epworth and District Agricultural Society, a charitable organisation. Its committee comprises community and honorary members, and patrons. Other activities run by the society between May and September include four horse & pony events, and an August Bank Holiday weekend Beer Festival with live bands.

=== Festival of the Plough ===
Epworth has hosted the Epworth Festival of the Plough agricultural fair for a number of years.

== Namesakes ==
Epworth gave its name to the city of Epworth, Iowa and the unincorporated community of Epworth, Georgia, both in the United States.

== Notable people ==
Beside John and Charles Wesley, other notable people associated with Epworth are:

- John de Mowbray, 4th Baron Mowbray, born in Epworth
- William de Epworth, fourteenth century judge and Crown official in Ireland, born in Epworth
- Alexander Kilham, founder of the Methodist New Connexion, born in Epworth
- Ian Botham, cricketer, former resident
- Benjamin Huntsman, inventor and manufacturer, born Epworth 1704
- Sheridan Smith, actress, born Epworth in 1981
- Mehetabel Wesley Wright (1697–1751), poet
