= De la Pole Hospital =

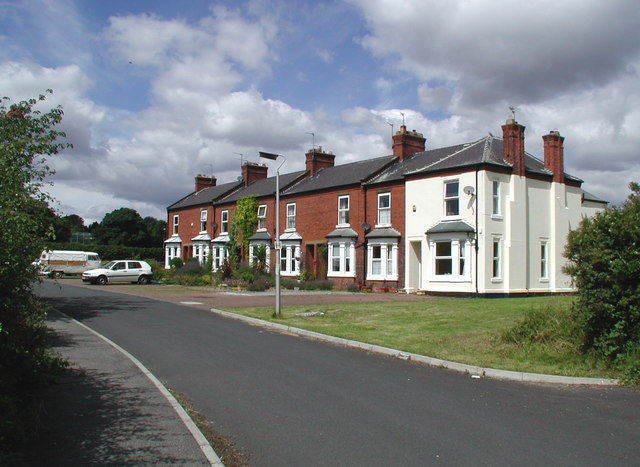
- Former staff accommodation at De la Pole Hospital

- Shown in the East Riding of Yorkshire

Geography
- Location: Willerby, East Riding of Yorkshire, England
- Coordinates: 53.7706°N 0.4418°W

Organisation
- Care system: NHS
- Type: Specialist

Services
- Emergency department: N/A
- Speciality: Psychiatric Hospital

History
- Founded: 1883
- Closed: 1998

Links
- Lists: Hospitals in England

De la Pole Hospital (also known as De la Pole Psychiatric Hospital) was a mental health facility in Willerby, East Riding of Yorkshire, England.

== History ==
The hospital was located on a site previously occupied by De la Pole Farm. It was designed by Frederick Stead Brodrick and Richard George Smith in the Victorian Gothic style, using a courtyard plan and opened as Kingston upon Hull Borough Asylum in December 1883. It became the Willerby Mental Hospital in the 1920s before joining the National Health Service as De la Pole Hospital in 1948.

After the introduction of Care in the Community in the early 1980s, the hospital went into a period of decline and eventually closed in July 1998. The main buildings have been demolished and that part of the site was redeveloped for business unit use. The chapel survives as a Grade II listed building and is now used as part of the Haltemprice Crematorium, opened in 1998.
