= Bracon =

Hamlet in North Lincolnshire, England

Coordinates: 53.55°N 00.82°W

- Location within Lincolnshire
- OS grid reference: SE7807
  - London: 145 mi (233 km) S
- Unitary authority: North Lincolnshire
- Ceremonial county: Lincolnshire
- Region: Yorkshire and the Humber
- Country: England
- Sovereign state: United Kingdom
- Post town: Doncaster
- Postcode district: DN9
- Dialling code: 01427
- Police: Humberside
- Fire: Humberside
- Ambulance: East Midlands

Bracon is a hamlet in North Lincolnshire, England. Bracon lies within the Isle of Axholme and the civil parish of Belton, a village to the north to which the hamlet is conjoined.
