= Willerby, East Riding of Yorkshire =

Village and civil parish in the East Riding of Yorkshire, England

Willerby
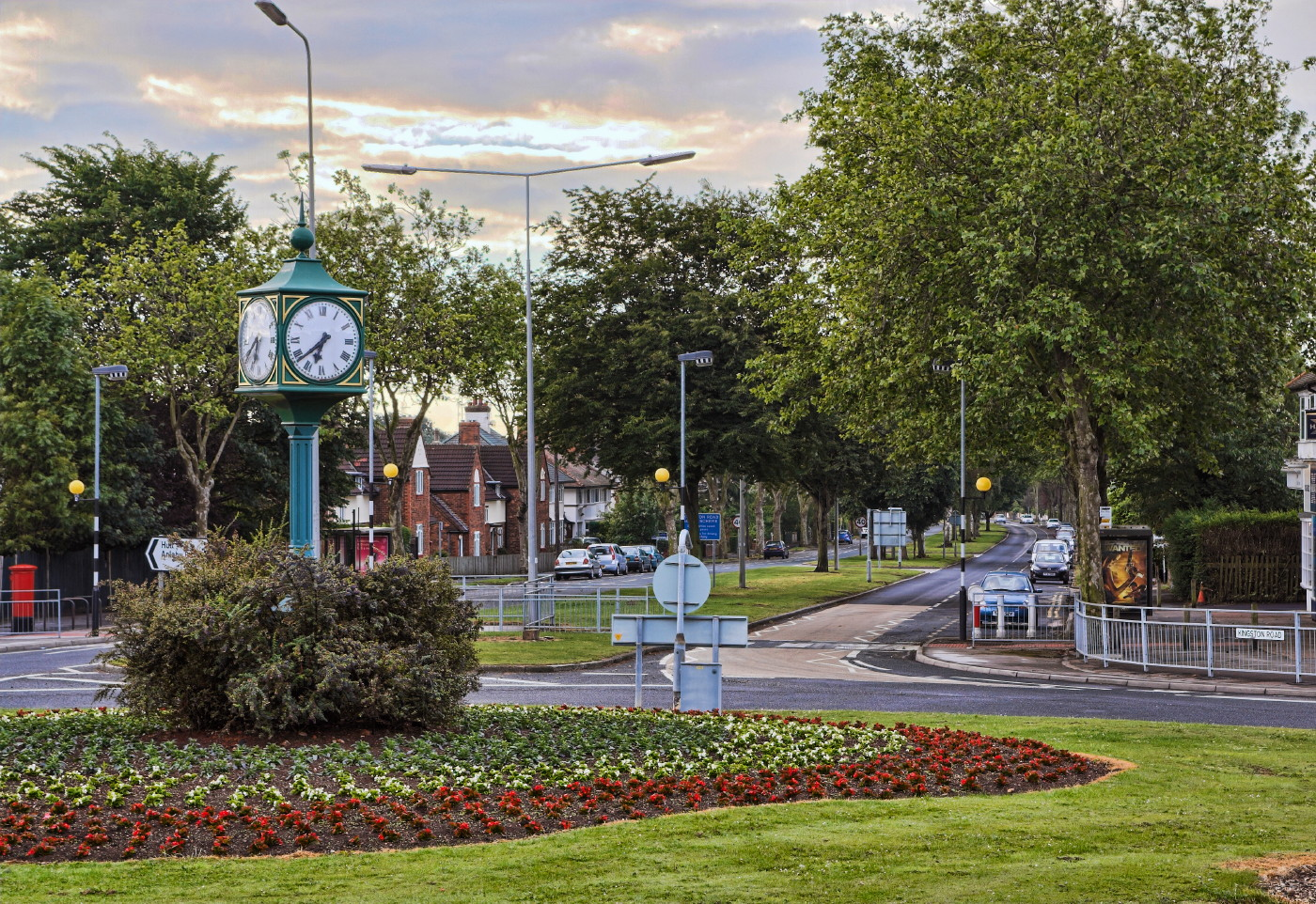
- Willerby Square Roundabout

- Location within the East Riding of Yorkshire
- Population: 7,940 (2011 census)
- OS grid reference: TA024304
  - London: 155 mi (249 km) S
- Civil parish: Willerby
- Unitary authority: East Riding of Yorkshire
- Ceremonial county: East Riding of Yorkshire
- Region: Yorkshire and the Humber
- Country: England
- Sovereign state: United Kingdom
- Post town: HULL
- Postcode district: HU10
- Dialling code: 01482
- Police: Humberside
- Fire: Humberside
- Ambulance: Yorkshire
- UK Parliament: Kingston upon Hull West and Haltemprice

Willerby is a village and civil parish located on the western outskirts of the city of Kingston upon Hull in the East Riding of Yorkshire, England.

Willerby was a minor settlement up to the 20th century, during which it became a suburb of Kingston upon Hull, and its urban development extended south-eastwards towards Hull. The village centre is located about five miles (eight kilometres) west of Kingston upon Hull city centre and lies outside the city boundary.

== History ==
The name Willerby derives from the Old English personal name Wilheard, and the Old Norse bȳ meaning 'village'.

Until the 20th century Willerby was a small village.

Enclosure of land around Willerby was enabled by acts of parliament in 1796 and 1824. In 1844 the population of the eight hundred and twenty acres (three hundred and thirty hectares) township of Willerby was 214 persons, in 45 houses. By the 1850s Willerby had a primitive methodist chapel (built 1850), a Hall, Oak Hill House, dating from the late 17th or early 18th century, now known as Willerby Hall, and another large dwelling, the Summer House, later known as The Beeches dating to the 18th century, and extended in the 1820s and 1850s. as well as smaller dwellings along Main Street, the village's original main road. A mental asylum, Hull Borough Lunatic Asylum, later known as De la Pole Hospital, and an associated chapel, was constructed beyond the village to the north in the 1880s. (Note: TA024317, De La Pole hospital, formerly Hull Borough Lunatic Asylum, closed 1997, demolished and redeveloped. Chapel and other associated buildings survive. now within the civil parish of Cottingham, East Riding of Yorkshire. The chapel gained listed building status in 1997, as of 2012 forms part of Haltemprice Crematorium.) Willerby and Kirk Ella railway station opened in 1885 as part of the Hull and Barnsley Railway which passed the main village close by on the southern edge.

By 1890 two further substantial houses had been built; Manor House (later Willerby Manor), (Note: TA025304, Willerby Manor, built mid 19th century, later used as a hotel. As of 2012, "Best Western Willerby Manor Hotel".) and the Grange, north of the village. (Note: TA021311, The Grange. Site later used as a hotel "Grange Park" with substantial extension (1990), Operated as part of Ramada Jarvis chain (2000s), as of 2012 part of Mercure Hotels hotel chain.) A new Methodist chapel and schoolroom were constructed between 1897 and 1900.

Small scale growth of housing started in the 20th century, with suburban developments eastward towards Hull along Kingston Road and Carr Lane well developed by the mid 20th century.

The beehive manufacturing company Yorkshire Apiary Company based in Willerby was commissioned to produce temporary buildings in the aftermath of the Second World War; the company, Willerby Caravan Company Ltd., (founded 1944, since 1996 Willerby Holiday Homes) was located on Main Street, the company later relocated to Hedon Road, Kingston upon Hull. (Note: 53.75813°N 0.449165°W, Willerby Caravan Company, former site)

In 1959 Willerby and Kirk Ella station closed, the line closed completely in 1964, and the station was demolished in 1968, and the site used for a housing development. Part of the route of the line was used (1970) to construct the B1232 forming a bypass for the A164 (Beverley) road, bypassing Willerby village.

Willerby Carr Lane County Primary School was established in the 1930s. In 1960 Willerby County Secondary School (now the lower school of Wolfreton School) was officially opened, though construction and extension continued through the 1960s and early 1970s. A third Methodist chapel, and the Anglican church of St Luke, were constructed in 1968, designed by architect Francis Johnson).

By the late 1960s urban development west of the traditional village centre, in the land between Carr Lane and the Hull and Barnsley railway line had reached modern (2012) levels, with the village now an effective suburb of Hull, separated by the green space of Springhead Golf Course. Further development of housing estates took place in the latter part of the 20th century, north of Carr Lane. The Wolfreton school and six form college was demolished and rebuilt at the Willerby site as a three-storey building beginning 2015. The former upper school Kirk-Ella school was made surplus to requirements by the rebuild. (The new school opened in September 2016.)

Between 2014 and 2015 a flood alleviation scheme, the Willerby and Derringham Bank Flood Alleviation Scheme, was constructed in the parish, built in response to the 2007 United Kingdom floods. The scheme consisted of upgrades to the drainage system (Phase 1), and four storage lagoons (Phase 2). Three storage lagoons with total capacity of around 205,000 cubic metres (7,200,000 cu ft) were constructed near the A164 at Willerby, (Note: One wholly outside the parish and two partially outside the parish, but all adjacent to the developed area of Willerby.) and a fourth south-east of Haltemprice Priory on the eastern edge of the parish. The total cost of the scheme was over £10 million.

In 2015 planning permission was given for 130 homes west of Great Gutter Lane, work on the development, "West Hill", started in August 2016.

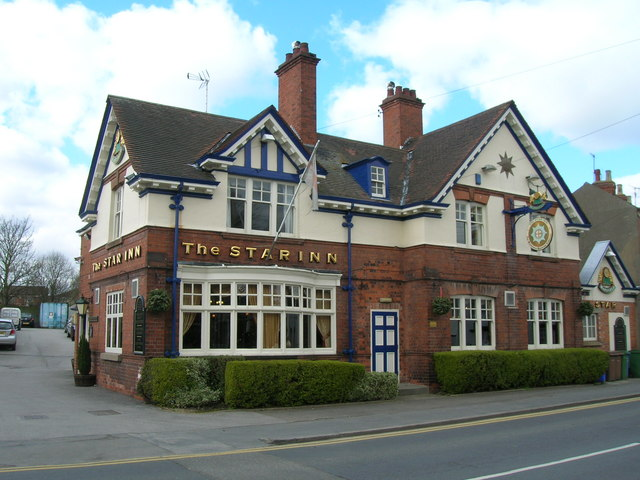
Star Inn, Main Street, Willerby

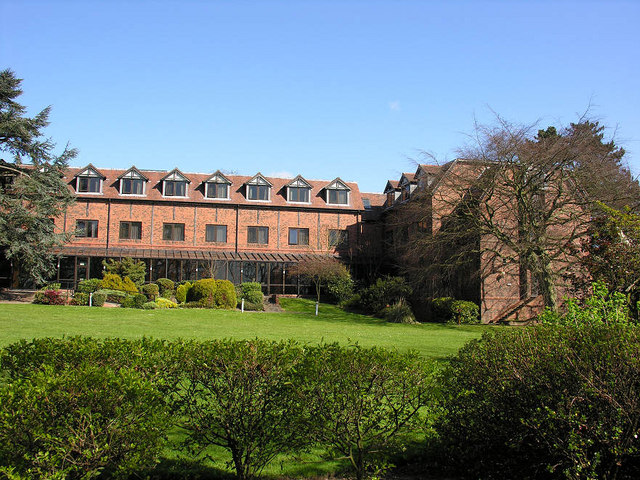
Grange Park Hotel

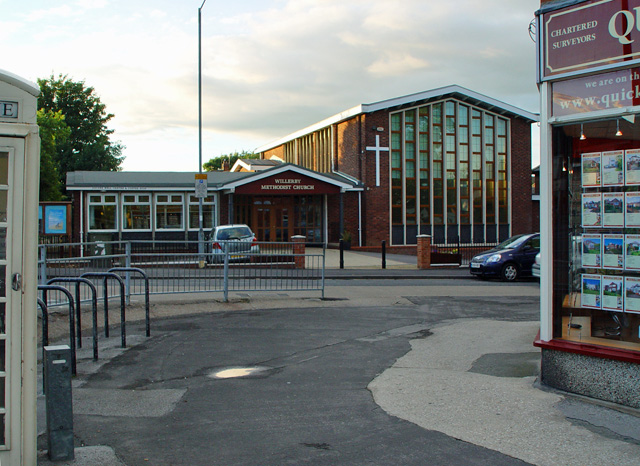
Willerby Methodist Church, built 1960s

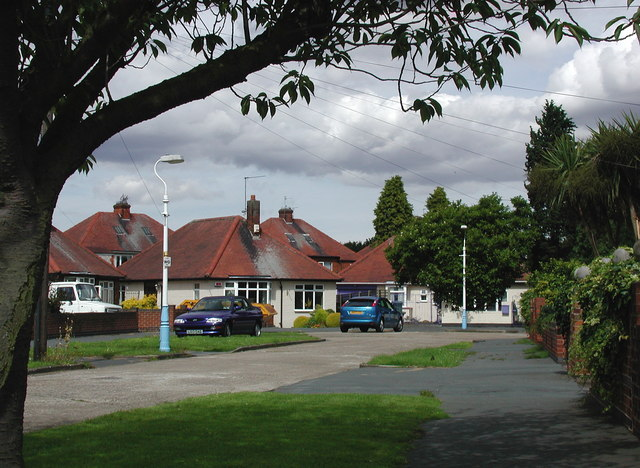
Post-war suburban housing

=== Wolfreton ===
53.75056°N 0.42985°W

Wolfreton was a small hamlet approximately 1/3 mile (500 metres) north of the old village centre of Anlaby, on Wolfreton Road connecting Anlaby to Willerby Carr Lane (now Carr Lane). In the Domesday Book it was mentioned as Uluardune. In the 1850s it consisted only of few buildings including an Inn, the Springhead Inn, there was also a farm "Wolfreton farm" at the junction of Wolfreton Road with Willerby Carr Lane. By the beginning of the 20th century the Hull and Barnsley Railway had been built just south of the hamlet, which had expanded with a short row of terraced housing - Wolfreton Lane crossed under the railway line, and a new larger Springhead Inn had been built to the north of the original. By 1926 additional terraced housing had been built Wolfreton Villas, as well as housing along the section of Wolfreton Road to Anlaby. Springhead Halt railway station was built in the 1920s near to the crossing of Wolfreton Lane by the railway.

Housing development off the new (1920s) Kingston Road between Hull and Willerby began to encroach on the hamlet by the middle of the 20th century.

As of 2006 Wolfreton continues to be marked as a place on Ordnance Survey maps.

== Willerby Hill ==
Willerby Hill is a small suburb just outside of Willerby. It is home to Willerby Hill Farm, cafe and horse riding stables. Total Fitness is there too along with swimming pools, gyms etc. Primarily, Willerby Hill is the boundary between Willerby and Cottingham and is mainly fields.

== Governance ==
Willerby is situated within the Parliamentary Constituency of Kingston upon Hull West and Haltemprice. The village lies within the East Riding of Yorkshire Council electoral ward of 'Willerby and Kirk Ella'. The population of this ward at the 2011 Census was 13,578.

== Geography ==
The village of Willerby forms an outermost western suburb of Hull, separated by non-agricultural green space including allotments, playing fields, and Springhead Park Golf Club. In the second half of the 20th century urban development became contiguous between the villages of Willerby, Kirk Ella to the south and Anlaby to the south-east. The northern half of the parish remains in agricultural use, and includes Haltemprice Priory farm, which contains archaeological remnants of the Augustinian Haltemprice Priory.

The boundaries of the modern civil parish of Willerby are formed by the route of the former Hull and Barnsley Railway (including the B1232 road) to the south, the A164 Beverley to Humber Bridge road to the west, and Sand Dike drainage channel in Springhead Park to the east. The northern boundary is with the civil parish of Cottingham. The parish rises from less than 33 feet above sea level in the east to approximately 130 feet at the western boundary, beyond which are the foothills of the Yorkshire Wolds in the parish of Skidby.

To the west of the village is Willerby Retail Park, which houses a Waitrose supermarket (formerly Safeway, 2004). Willerby has two hotels, converted from late 19th century houses, "The Grange", now the Grange Park Hotel and Willerby Manor. The 1960 buildings of the lower school of Wolfreton School are within the civil parish of Willerby.

According to the 2011 UK census, Willerby parish had a population of 7,940, a reduction on the 2001 UK census figure of 8,056.

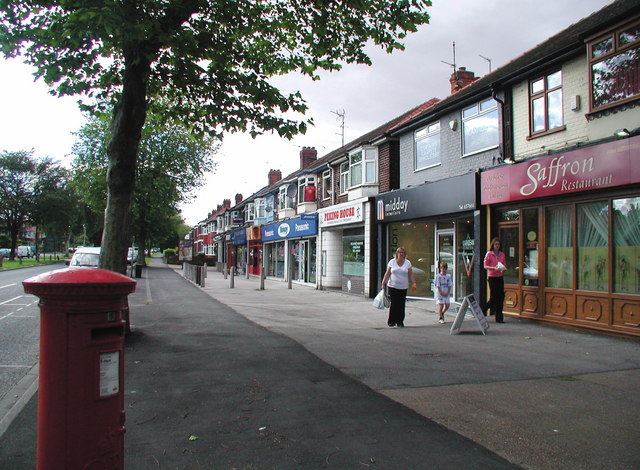
Shops on Kingston Road

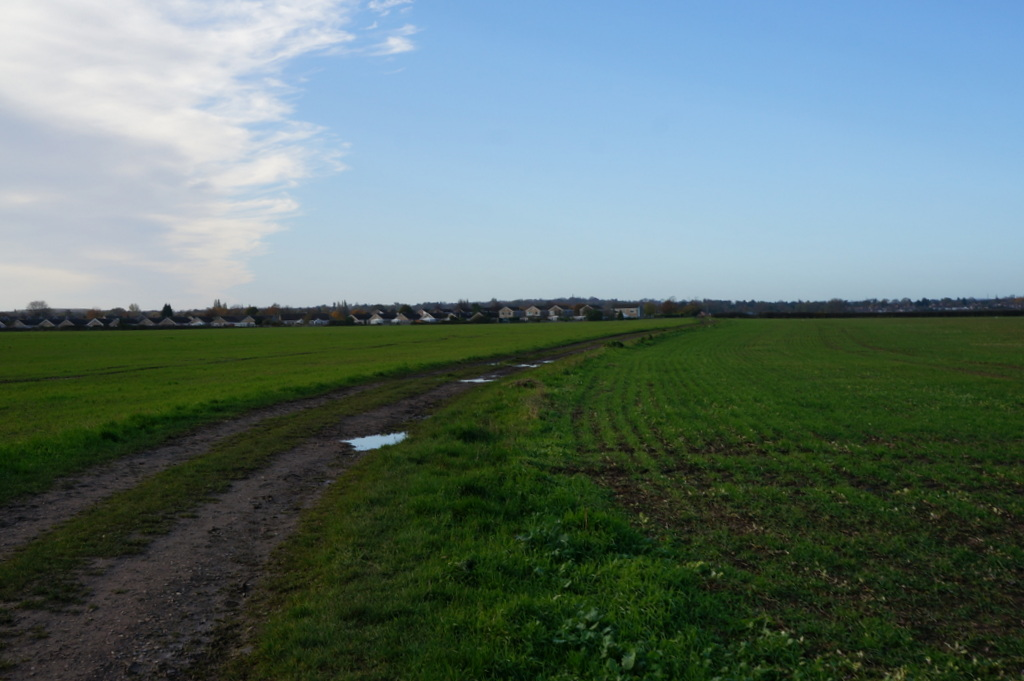
Farmland looking towards Brimington Road and Well Lane

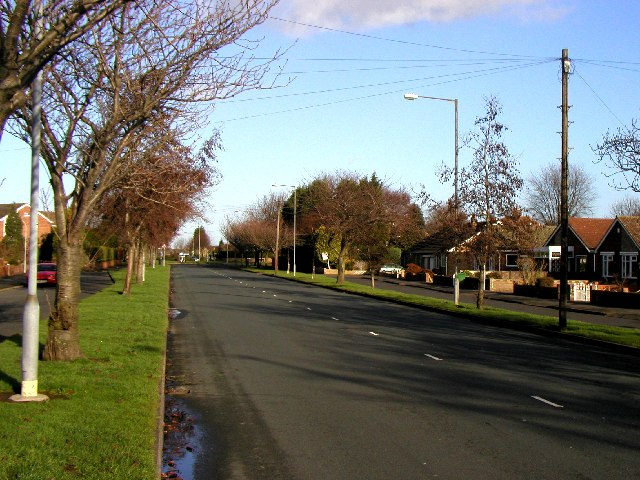
The Parkway

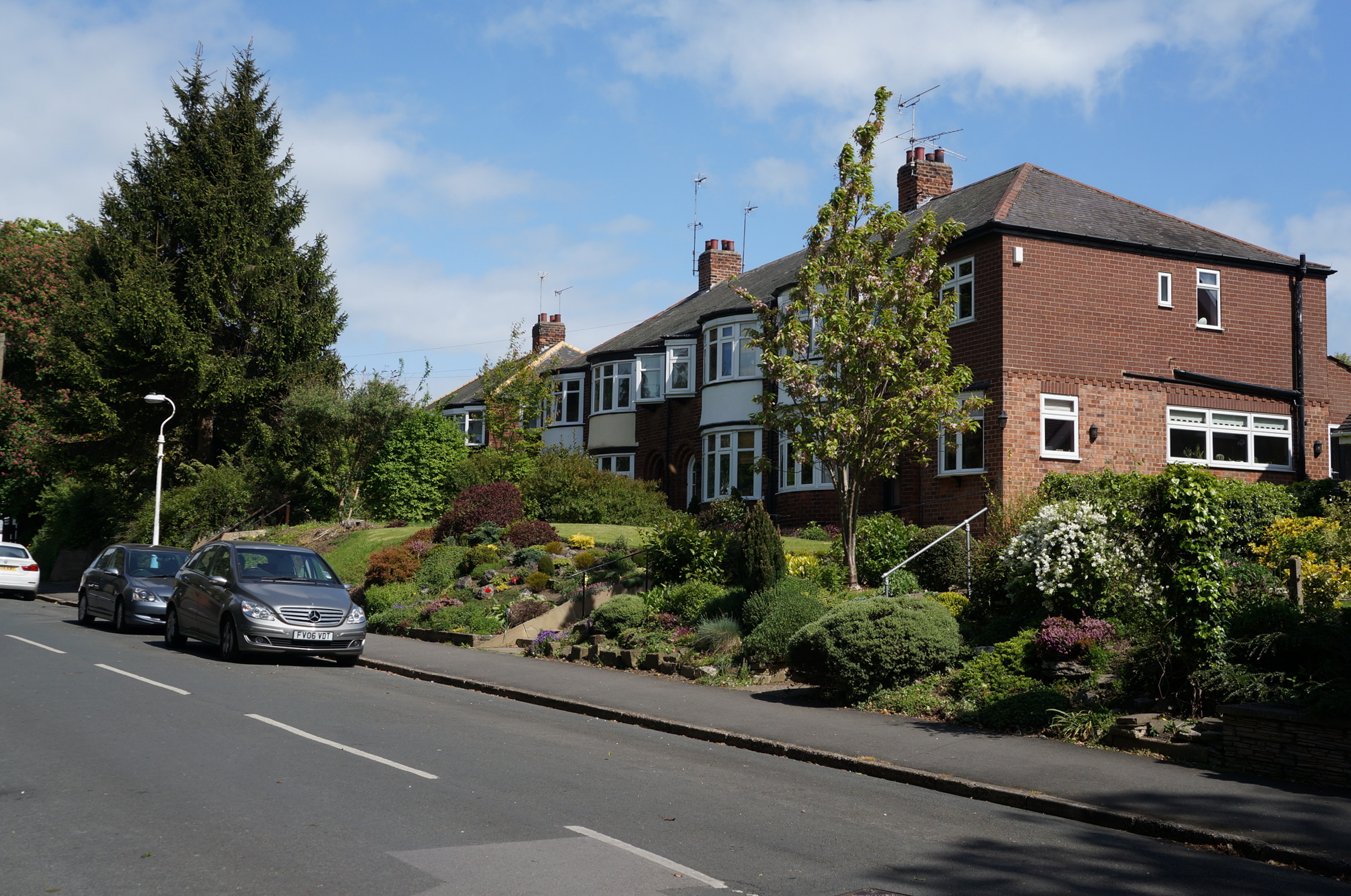
Housing on Main Street

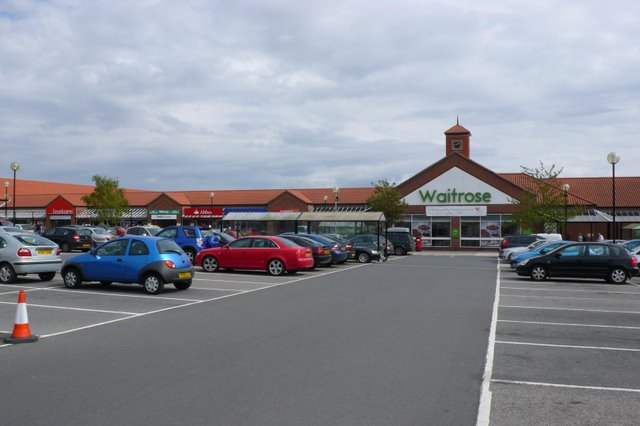
Willerby Shopping Park

== See also ==
- Listed buildings in Willerby, East Riding of Yorkshire
- Fairview Studios, a recording studio situated in the village.
- Haltemprice Priory, former monastery and farm to the north-east of Willerby
