= Haltemprice Priory =

Augustinian monastery in the East Riding of Yorkshire, UK

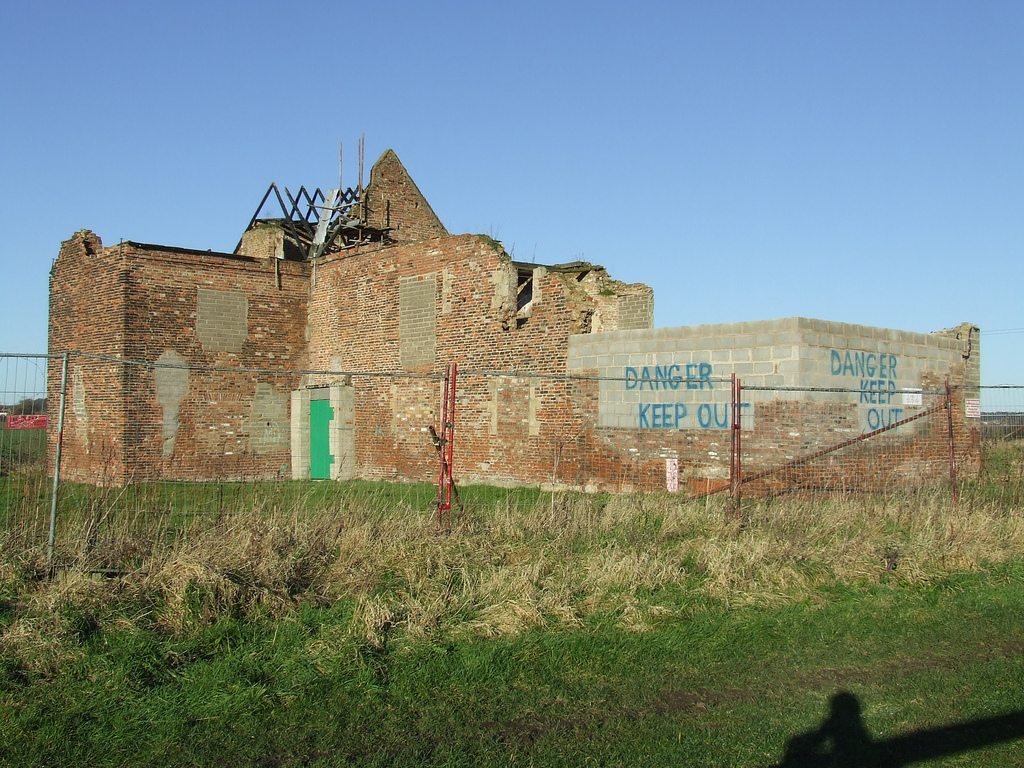

Religion
- Affiliation: Augustinian
- Ecclesiastical or organisational status: Priory
- Year consecrated: 1326

Location
- Location: Willerby, England
- Interactive map of Haltemprice Priory
- OS grid reference: TA 040 309
- Coordinates: 53.764613°N 0.420900°W

Haltemprice Priory was an Augustinian monastery approximately two miles south of the village of Cottingham in the East Riding of Yorkshire, England. The original monastic buildings have long since gone, although ruins of a farmhouse, built in 1584, remain on site and incorporate some of the Priory stonework.

== Origins ==
In 1320 Pope John XXII licensed Thomas Wake, of Liddell in Cumberland (who inherited the manor of Cottingham in 1300), to found an Augustinian monastery in Cottingham incorporating the church there. Some records suggest that the first Priory was actually built, and that canons of the house of Bourne in the Diocese of Lincoln had taken up residence there when legal complications arose.

It was discovered that, because of certain statutes of English law, Thomas Wake's heirs or successors would have been able to order the future demolition of the Priory. It was for this reason that the Pope granted further licence that the Priory should be moved to another suitable location, so it was with permission from both the Pope and Edward II that Thomas Wake moved the monastery to Newton – a now deserted medieval village two miles south of Cottingham.

== History ==
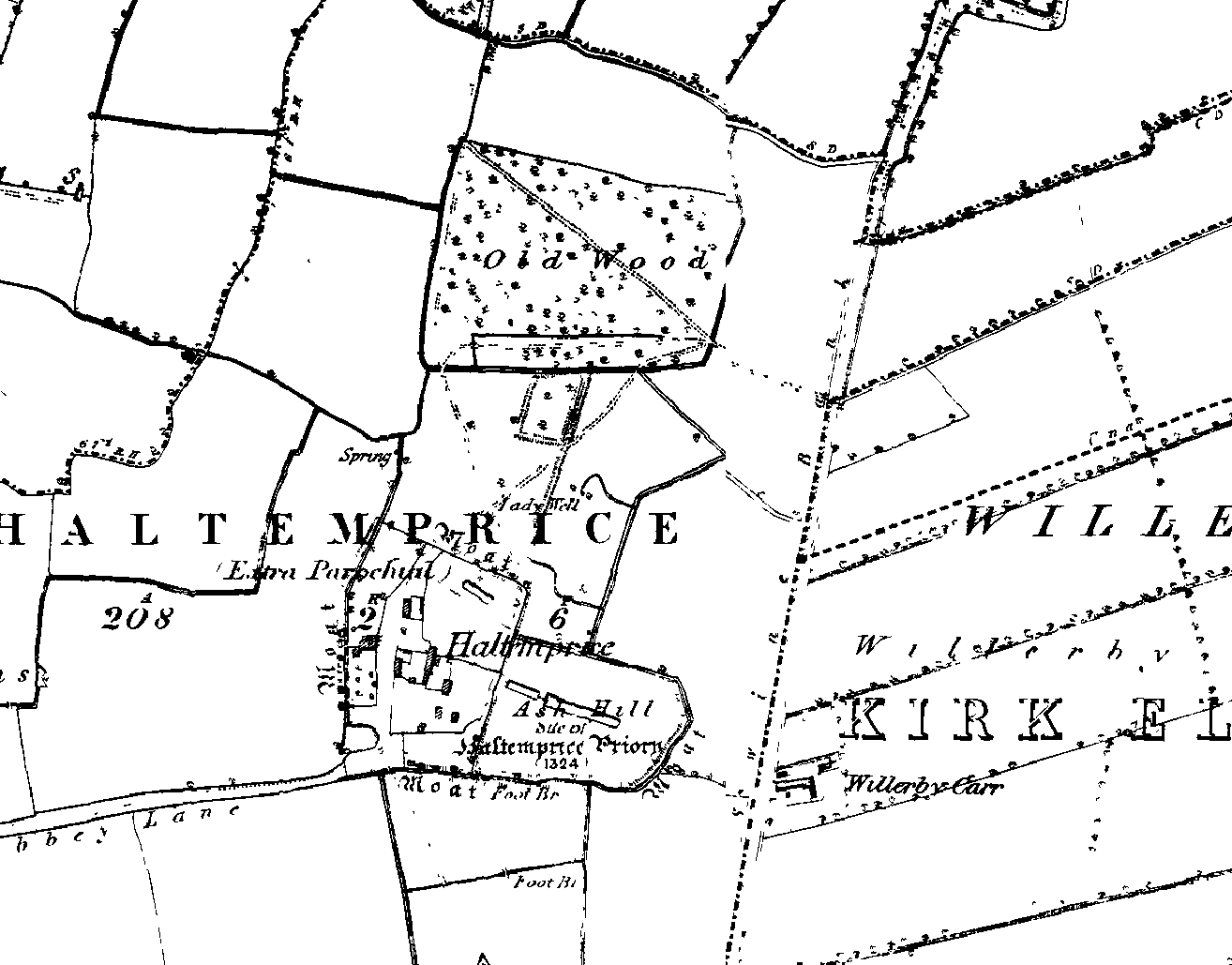
1855 OS map showing the location of the priory site

=== Foundation ===
In the foundation charter of 1325, Thomas Wake bestowed the manors of Newton, Willerby and Wolfreton upon Haltemprice Priory (originally Alta Prisa, from the medieval French Haulte Emprise or "High Endeavour", giving the modern name Haltemprice) with the rent and services of the free tenants and serfs therein. He also gave half the toll of the market of Cottingham, and of the fairs there, and the advowson of the churches of Cottingham, Kirk Ella, Wharram Percy and Belton in the Isle of Axholme.

=== Heyday, 1320–1342 ===
During 1320 to 1342, Haltemprice Priory experienced its heyday. At the peak of its influence, the Priory controlled a large swathe of land extending from Willerby to Cottingham, Kirk Ella and Southwood. Despite the personal, political, financial and military problems affecting him – including the capture of his castle at Liddell by King David of Scotland – Thomas Wake continued to bestow gifts upon the priory until 1342 when records of further benefactions cease. Sir Thomas died in 1349 and was interred at the priory.

=== Decline, 1342–1534 ===
From 1342 to 1534 the Priory's fortunes turned. A combination of mounting debt, administrative incompetence and a string of expensive litigation drained the ecclesiastical finances to the point where Priory could no longer be sustained by the flow of donations it received from its benefactors.

The situation was dire, and at the time of Sir Thomas's death in 1349 the construction of the Priory was still not fully complete. Since then – with the decline in finances – the Priory had fallen into an even worse state of disrepair. In a report issued to Pope John XXIII (Antipope) in 1411 it was revealed that a gale had blown down the bell-tower, ruining the church and other buildings and that a fire had destroyed the Priory gateway and nearby offices. The Priory was in such a bad state of disrepair it afforded poor accommodation for those living there.

From 1415 to 1458 Haltemprice Priory was made exempt from royal taxation on grounds of 'notorious poverty'.

In 1515 a dispute came to pass between John Wymersley, the Prior of Haltemprice, and Edward Mattison, the Sheriff of Hull, over who possessed legal authority over Willerby and Wolfreton. A battle ensued, only to be broken up by the Mayor of Hull, and settled in the Court of Star Chamber – three years later. The final ruling allowed Hull control of the freshwater springs conceding the royalties of Willerby and Wolfreton to the Priory.

=== Dissolution ===
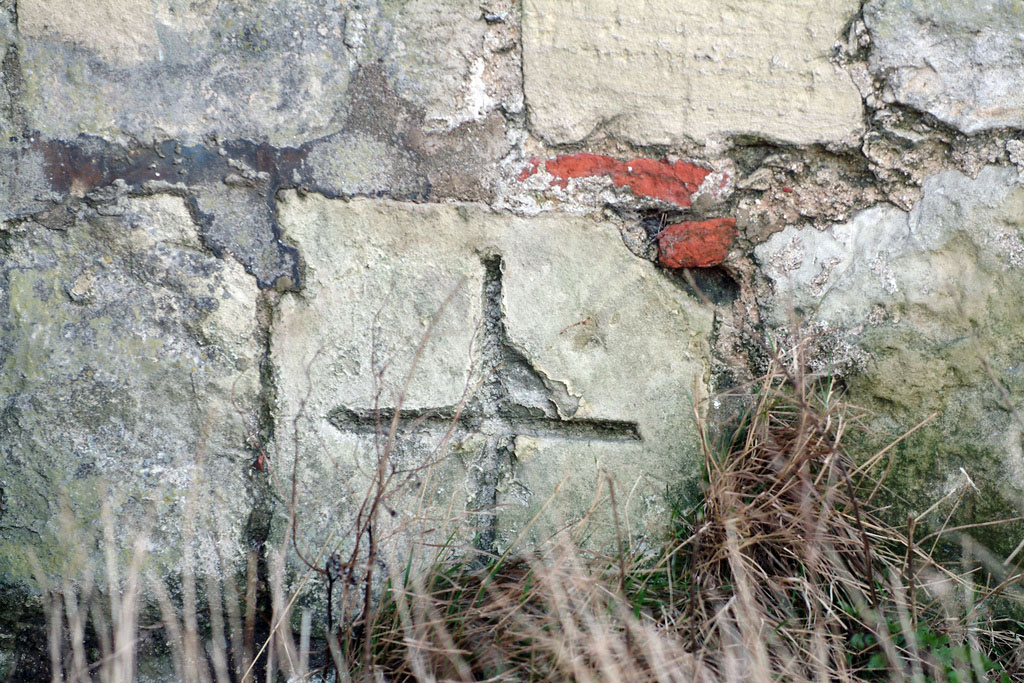
Ashlar block incorporated into later farmhouse, of probable origin from the priory

During the Dissolution of the Monasteries orchestrated by Henry VIII the house was visited by commissioners Richard Layton and Thomas Legh. On 26 May 1536 they reported that the house was occupied by a prior and nine canons along with forty servants and boys. Haltemprice Priory was finally dissolved on 12 August 1536.

=== Priors of Haltemprice ===
The following list of priors is taken from Hayton.

Name	Start of office	End of office
Thomas de Overton	1327	died 1328
Robert Engayne	1329	resigned
John de Hickling	confirmed 1331	
Thomas de Elveley	confirmed 1332	resigned 1338
William de Wolfreton	1338	died 1349
Robert de Hickling	1349	resigned 1357
Peter de Harpham	1357	resigned 1362
Robert de Hickling	elected 1362	occurs 1367 ????
Peter (de Harpham)??		occurs 1370
Robert Claworth		died 1391
William de Selby	confirmed 1391	occurs 1414
Richard Worleby	occurs 1415	resigned 1423
John Thweng	elected 1424	(occurs 1425, 1430–35, 1437)
Robert Thweng	occurs 1435	1439
Thomas Dalehouse	elected 1441	resigned 1457
Robert Holme	confirmed 1457	
William Maunsel	elected 1471	died 1502
William Kirkham	1502	died 1506
John Wymmersley	1506	died 1514
John Nandyke	confirmed 1514	occurs 1517
Nicholas Haldesworth	1518	
Richard Fawconer	elected 1528	resigned 1531
Robert Colynson	elected 1531	last prior

== Burials ==
- Thomas Wake, 2nd Baron Wake of Liddell

== Haltemprice Priory Farm ==
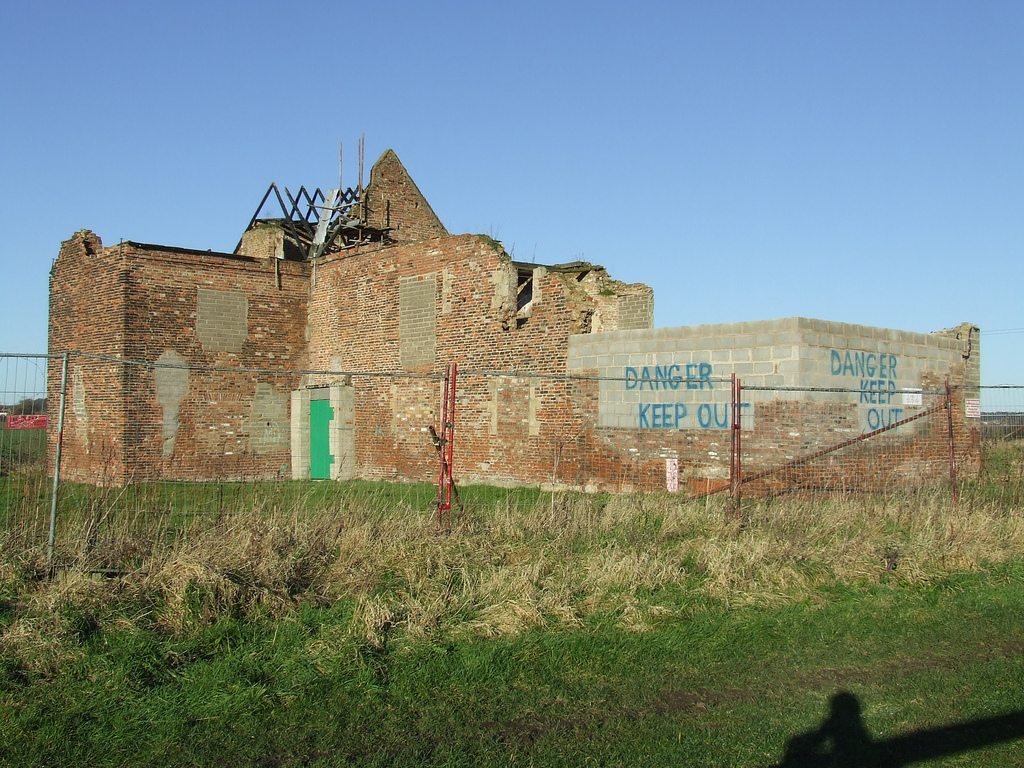
Haltemprice Priory Farmhouse (2007)

Haltemprice Priory Farm dates from the 15th to 16th century with late-18th-century alterations. The structure is thought to incorporate stonework from the dissolved priory. The farm was occupied up to 1988; it became derelict, and suffered fire damage in the late 1990s and early 2000s. The building is designated as a Grade II* Listed Building of Special Architectural or Historic Interest and was first listed in 1951. The priory site itself is classified as a Scheduled Monument, first scheduled in 1957. The farm is on the Heritage at Risk Register.

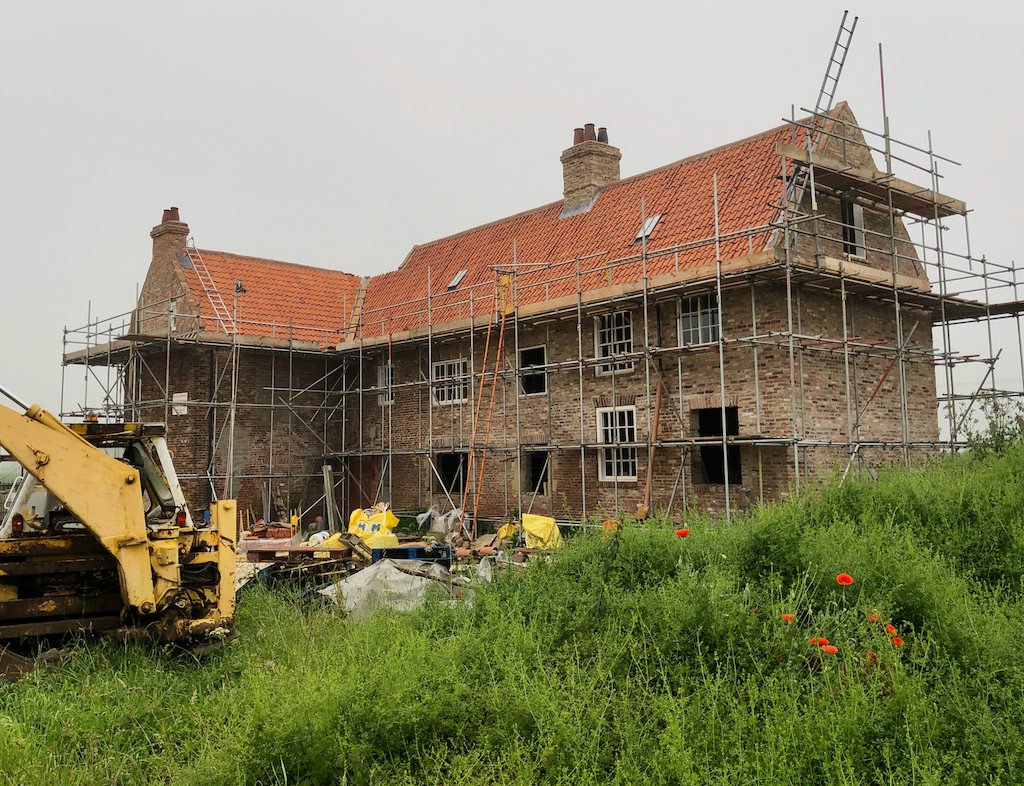
Haltemprice Priory Farmhouse (2021)

In 2021 and 2022, the farmhouse was extensively rebuilt and refurbished into a private residence. The building standing there today is a mix of the original farmhouse brick, and new installations that have been kept in design with the house's history.

== See also ==
- List of monastic houses in the East Riding of Yorkshire
- List of monastic houses in England
