= TMCR 95.3 =

Today's More Choice Radio – TMCRFM Limited
- Thorne; United Kingdom
- Broadcast area: North East Doncaster and the Isle of Axholme
- Frequencies: 95.3 (Thorne) & 107.5 (Epworth) FM MHz (87.9 used in 2005)
- Branding: TMCR FM

Programming
- Format: Multi-Genre / Speech / Contemporary / Local Radio

Ownership
- Owner: Independent Community Radio

History
- First air date: July 2005 (1st RSL), 14 December 2009 (full time)

Technical information
- Power: 25 watts

Links
- Website: https://tmcrfm.org/

TMCR or Today's More Choice Radio is a community radio station based in Thorne, South Yorkshire, England, broadcasting to north-east Doncaster and parts of the Isle of Axholme in Lincolnshire.

TMCR was set up as a restricted service licence or 'trial station' to see how it would be received by the communities of Thorne and Moorends. Supported by Doncaster Metropolitan Borough Council, and with financial backing through the Neighbourhood Renewal Fund, a four-week period on-air was run from a studio in Thorne.

== Launch ==
TMCR was launched with a 28-day trial broadcast in the summer of 2005 on 87.9 FM. The opening was performed by Ed Miliband MP in his capacity as member for Doncaster North. Preparations were being made to start full-time broadcasts from October 2009 with the main launch date pencilled in as 16 November with a frequency of 95.3 FM. Due to funding issues, this date had to be postponed. A new launch date of Monday 14 December 2009 was decided upon, broadcasts commenced at 9.53 am. Test transmissions were heard on 95.3 FM from 27 November.

== Background ==
In 2005 a temporary studio/office was set up in Thorne town centre. This was used for the short-term broadcast in the summer of that year, then the group moved to The Winning Post, Moorends, in early 2007. Whilst the licence application was being prepared, submitted and achieved, some training sessions were held with local people and students of the Trinity Academy. Due mainly to lack of funding, the studio had been unavailable for long periods of time as much of the work was being done away from the office.

== Building to licence application ==
An application for a full 5-year licence was submitted to Ofcom in June 2007. On 20 December 2007 an announcement was made by OfCom that TMCR was to be offered a five-year community radio licence

In January 2008, the committee registered the group as a company limited by guarantee, TMCRFM Limited no. 6471394, in preparation for the future expansion of the group and the service it will offer. Funding applications made in 2009 were intended to have the station return to the airwaves in October 2009 on a full-time basis. This was deferred to 14 December after last minute funding issues.

The transmitter site has been determined as SE685134, which gives coverage to Thorne, Moorends, Fishlake, Stainforth, Dunscroft, Hatfield and parts of several other local communities. Clearance of 95.3 as the broadcast frequency has been made by OfCom.

The station also now broadcasts on 107.5 FM in Epworth in Lincolnshire.

== Community activity ==
Members of the team are appearing at events in the area, such as the annual Thorne Festival and various shows. The station has the remit to promote all local opportunities, events and services that are provided for the benefit of station listeners. This involves working with other community groups in collating information and making on-air announcements.

TMCR have provided PA at many local events during the summer months, appearing at the Thorne Festival, Thorne Regatta, Community As One day, Doncaster Disabled Games, as well as various Sunday afternoons on the bandstand in Thorne Memorial Park.

'Today's More Choice Radio' as TMCR is known; is active in the North East of Doncaster for serving the community.

== Schedule ==
Shows run all week from 7 am until 9 pm. You will be updated about the weather, news, travel, and community news. Music is played throughout the night as well by Sandy the Jukebox. A full listing of the shows and the schedule can be seen on the TMCR website.

== Notable Presenters ==
- Mick Finley
- Malcolm Ley (Malcom In The Morning - TMCR Breakfast)
- Mark Walmsley (Saturdays 3-6pm & Middle Of The Week Show 12pm-6pm)
- Steve Hanks

Sandy the Juke Box automated.

== Past members ==
- Gordon Sharpe
- Robert (Bob) Ashton
- Sue Mundin
- Kieth Fox
- Ian Gilligan
- Duncan Hedley
- Craig Headley
- Claire Hedley
- Jane Lloyd (Secretary)
- Brian Fill
- Lucy Doxey
- Joshua Bull (Sales/Advertising)
- Kirsten Martin
- Michael Tiller (IT Support)
- Kirsty Bradbury
- Adrian Slack

Perter Lee Yvonne Cole Gary Kelly Kim B Lee Dennis Hartley Madeline Roberts
