= Trolleybuses in Glasgow =

Public transport system in Glasgow, Scotland

Glasgow trolleybus system
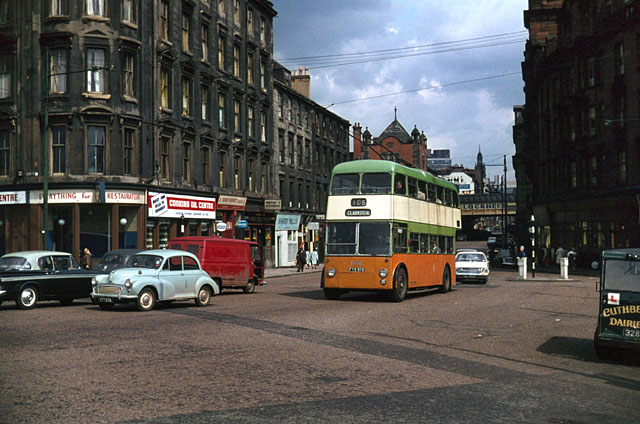
- TB116 en route to Clarkston, near Victoria Bridge

Operation
- Locale: Glasgow, Scotland
- Open: 1949
- Close: 1967
- Status: Closed
- Operator: Glasgow Corporation

Infrastructure
- Electrification: V DC parallel overhead lines

The Glasgow trolleybus system operated in and immediately surrounding the city of Glasgow, Scotland, between 1949 and 1967, with the network reaching its largest extent in 1959. It was the only British system to open after World War II.

The trolleybuses were owned and operated by Glasgow Corporation's Transport Department (along with the city's buses, trams and the Subway).

== Routes ==
All Glasgow's trolleybus routes were numbered from 101 onwards. Summary of services:

- 101: Started on 6 November 1949, initially between Shawfield and Cathedral Street (replacing part of tram route 10). The route was eventually extended to run between Rutherglen and Riddrie. Closed on 20 April 1966 and replaced by bus route 27.
- 102: Started on 3 April 1949, initially between Polmadie and Riddrie (replacing tram route 2). Cut back from Riddrie to Royston Road on 2 September 1962. Withdrawn on 30 April 1966.
- 103: Southerly extension of route 102 to Hampden Park, starting on 3 July 1949 (but not renumbered 103 until 6 August 1950). Withdrawn on 9 May 1959.
- 104: Started on 31 August 1952 between Muirend and Cathedral Street, replacing part of motorbus route 37. Withdrawn on 6 January 1962.t
- 105: Started on 5 July 1953 between Queen's Cross and Clarkston, replacing part of tram route 13. Withdrawn on 27 May 1967 and replaced by bus route 66. This was the last trolleybus route to operate in Scotland.
- 106: Started on 15 June 1958 between Millerston or Riddrie and Bellahouston, replacing tram route 7. Additional rush hour services to Linthouse and Shieldhall were replaced by motorbus route 106 on 14 November 1964, due to the construction of the Clyde Tunnel. Service withdrawn on 1 October 1966 and replaced by bus route 65.
- 107: Started 7 May 1958 between Maitland Street and Muirend, replacing parts of motorbus routes 18 and 43. Withdrawn 4 March 1967 and replaced by bus 67.
- 108: Started 15 November 1958 between Mount Florida and Paisley Road Toll (actually The Old Govan Town Hall at Princes Dock, was where this route turned around, after Tunnel opened), replacing tram service 12. Rush hour services to Linthouse and Shieldhall withdrawn on 14 November 1964 (see route 106). Withdrawn 4 March 1967 and replaced by bus 68.

== Vehicles ==
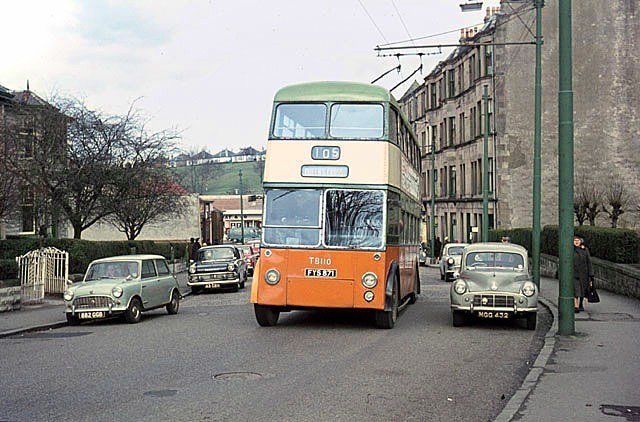
TB110 at the route 105 terminus in Mearns Road, Clarkston

The majority of Glasgow's trolleybuses were double-deck vehicles, painted in Glasgow Corporation's orange, green and cream livery (though in a different style from the buses and trams). The destination blinds on the trolleybuses used white letters on a green background (unlike the trams and buses, with more conventional white lettering on a black background).

Glasgow's first trolleybuses were a fleet of 34 three axle (six-wheeled), double-deck B.U.T. vehicles with bodywork by Metro-Cammell of Birmingham. They were almost identical to those built for London Transport, even briefly including London's distinctive trolleybus symbol (a "T" over the London Transport roundel). In 1950 Glasgow bought 30 Daimler trolleybuses.

Between 1957 and 1959, a fleet of 90 B.U.T. type 9613T trolleybuses with Crossley double-deck bodywork were built. Unlike the earlier vehicles, these trolleybuses had two axles.

There were three of the former Glasgow trolleybuses saved from scrap: TB78, TBS13, and TBS21.

TB78 is fully restored and in operation at the British Trolleybus Society museum, Sandtoft. It remains the only Scottish double-decker trolleybus in existence.

TBS13 was displayed at the original Glasgow Museum of Transport in Albert Drive, Pollokshields, and moved with the museum to the Kelvin Hall. When that museum closed and some its collection was transferred to the new Riverside Museum in 2011, TBS13 was not one of the exhibits fortunate enough to be granted a place there; it resided at the Glasgow Museums Resource Centre at South Nitshill where it was not on public view except by arrangement at the Glasgow Transport Museum. However, to mark the 50th Anniversary of the end of the Glasgow system, TBS13 was returned to public display at the Glasgow Riverside Museum in May. It is now the only Scottish single-decker trolleybus in existence.

TBS21 was eventually scrapped by 2015. TBS21 was almost the last trolleybus to run on the streets of Glasgow. It had been repainted inside and out by GCT at Larkfield Works and, having been purchased by the NTA, it was allowed to tour the system on the final evening and ran behind the final service trolley (TB105) on the last 105 from Queen's Cross to Hampden Garage, for which it displayed a specially made 'Scotland’s Last Trolleybus' blind. It was, however, trumped by TB123, (the last trolleybus built for the city) which made a final trip under power the following morning (Sunday 28 May 1967) from Hampden to Gorbals Cross; from there it was towed by CUS807 to Ibrox bus garage where, as a final show of independence, it reversed into line on its batteries.

It was also the only preserved trolleybus to run under wire in Scotland, England, and Wales - it completed tours of Cardiff in September 1967 and Bournemouth in May 1968. In the years since then, it has led a peripatetic existence, often stored outside, its condition deteriorating all the while until, eventually, it wound up at the ill-fated Beith Transport Museum in North Ayrshire. It was subsequently offered for sale again and there was a real chance that it might have been acquired by Sandtoft although its restoration would have been a long and expensive business. Unfortunately, its eventual purchaser, who apparently tried very hard to find a suitable home for it, had to accept the inevitable and TBS21 was scrapped in late 2014/early 2015.

== Closure ==
The trolleybuses (as well as the city's much larger tram fleet) used electricity generated at the Pinkston power station, later sold to the South of Scotland Electricity Board. Following the closure of the tram system in 1962, the maintenance of the electrical supply system solely for the trolleybuses became impractically expensive.

Construction of approach roads to the Clyde Tunnel led to the abandonment of trolleybus services to Linthouse and Shieldhall in 1964. In 1965, Glasgow Corporation agreed to purchase 150 new Leyland Atlantean diesel buses to replace the remaining trolleybuses. Glasgow's last trolleybuses ran on 27 May 1967.

== See also ==
- Transport in Glasgow
- List of trolleybus systems in the United Kingdom
- Scottish Tramway and Transport Society
- The Trolleybus Museum at Sandtoft
