= RAF Sandtoft =

Former Royal Air Force station in England

RAF Sandtoft
- Sandtoft, Lincolnshire in England

Site information
- Owner: Air Ministry
- Operator: Royal Air Force
- Controlled by: RAF Flying Training Command

Location
- Shown within Lincolnshire
- Coordinates: 53.561°N 0.866°W

Site history
- Built: 1943
- In use: 1943-1957
- Battles/wars: Second World War; Cold War

Royal Air Force Sandtoft or more simply RAF Sandtoft is a former Royal Air Force station in North Lincolnshire between Doncaster, South Yorkshire and Scunthorpe, North Lincolnshire, England.

Today, the site is the commercial Sandtoft Airfield.

== History ==
=== Second World War ===
RAF Sandtoft opened in February 1944 as a satellite airfield to RAF Lindholme which was 3 mi (5 km) to the west.

No. 1 Group RAF, RAF Bomber Command based a number of aircraft here from the No. 1667 Heavy Conversion Unit RAF, including Handley Page Halifaxes from RAF Faldingworth and Avro Lancasters.

In November 1944 the airfield transferred to No. 7 Group RAF Bomber Command.

The RAF station closed on 10 November 1945.

=== Post Second World War ===
After the Second World War, the airfield was placed on care and maintenance and remained inactive until allocated to the United States Air Force on 1 April 1953. The station was never occupied by the USAF and returned to Air Ministry control on 8 September 1955 for disposal.

Today many of the original buildings still exist. However, much of the old RAF Station has been converted to commercial use and a section of perimeter track is maintained and used by a flying club. The Trolleybus Museum at Sandtoft also uses part of the site.

== See also ==
- List of former Royal Air Force stations
