= Belton, North Lincolnshire =

Village in Lincolnshire, England

Coordinates: 53.5530°N 0.8166°W

Belton
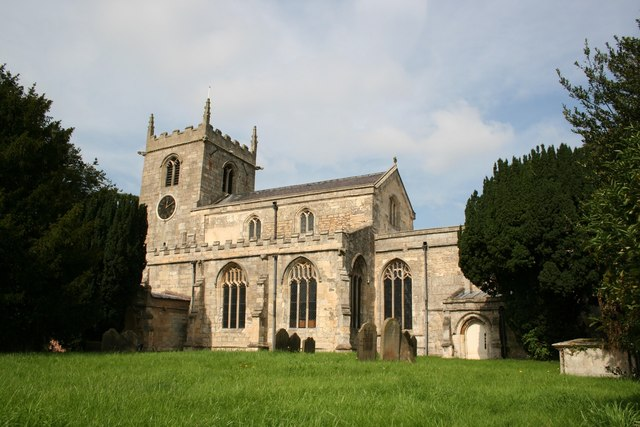
- All Saints' Church, Belton

- Location within Lincolnshire
- Population: 2,968 (2011)
- OS grid reference: SE784069
  - London: 145 mi (233 km) S
- Unitary authority: North Lincolnshire
- Ceremonial county: Lincolnshire
- Region: Yorkshire and the Humber
- Country: England
- Sovereign state: United Kingdom
- Post town: Doncaster
- Postcode district: DN9
- Dialling code: 01427
- Police: Humberside
- Fire: Humberside
- Ambulance: East Midlands
- UK Parliament: Doncaster East and the Isle of Axholme

Belton is a village and civil parish in the Isle of Axholme area of North Lincolnshire, England. It is situated on the A161 road, and approximately 6 miles (10 km) west of Scunthorpe. To the north is Crowle and to the south is Epworth.

== Locality ==
Pevsner describes Belton as "a large and scattered village - rather a group of hamlets". The parish boundaries include the hamlets of Beltoft, Sandtoft, Churchtown, Bracon, Carrhouse, Mosswood, Grey Green, Stockholes Tubary and Westgate.

At the 1991 Census, Belton had a population of 2,549, increasing to 2,968 at the 2011 census.

== Church ==
Belton Grade I listed Anglican church is dedicated to All Saints. The church is of perpendicular style. Within its chancel chapel is a 14th-century tomb, supposed to be that of Sir Richard de Belwood.

== Sandtoft ==
Sandtoft was granted to the abbey of St Mary's York, c. 1150, by Roger de Mowbray, for the use of a single monk. By 1241, it had become a separate monastic cell, later annexed by the larger cell of St Mary Magdalene, Lincoln.

RAF Sandtoft, a former RAF Bomber Command airfield, closed in 1955 and has since been converted to other use, including for Sandtoft Airfield which is home to Sandtoft Flying School. The Trolleybus Museum at Sandtoft, the largest trolleybus museum in Europe, is located on part of the site of the former air base.

== Notable buildings ==
Grade II listed Hirst Priory is on or near the site of a monastic cell at Hirst. In the early 12th century the lands for the cell were granted by Nigel d'Albini to the Austin canons of Nostell Priory. The cell, which was extant until the 16th century, housed a single canon to oversee the priory's property and tithes. The house was built in the 18th century, with later additions in the 19th.

Temple Bellwood was a large house in 200 acres (0.8 km^{2}) of parkland north of Belton. The land once belonged to the Knights Templar of Balsall, Warwickshire.

At Westgate there is a 19th century tower mill which ceased operation in the 1960s. It is a Grade II listed building.

== Transport ==
The M180 runs east west to the north of the village.

The Axholme Joint Railway formerly ran north-south through the village with a station on the line.

An Ordnance Survey map from the 1920s shows an agricultural tramway network running around North Moor, to the north of Temple Belwood, linking to the railway at Hagg Lane siding. As well as use on farms, such lines were also used for peat extraction in this area, as on the nearby Thorne and Hatfield Moors, often using WW1 trench railway equipment.

== Amenities ==
Belton has a small primary school that has been in existence since 1869, and two public houses.

== Sources ==
- Pevsner, Nikolaus; Harris, John; Antram, Nicholas (2002). Lincolnshire. The Buildings of England. New Haven, US and London: Yale University Press. ISBN 0-300-09620-8.
