= The Trolleybus Museum at Sandtoft =

Trolleybus Museum at Sandtoft
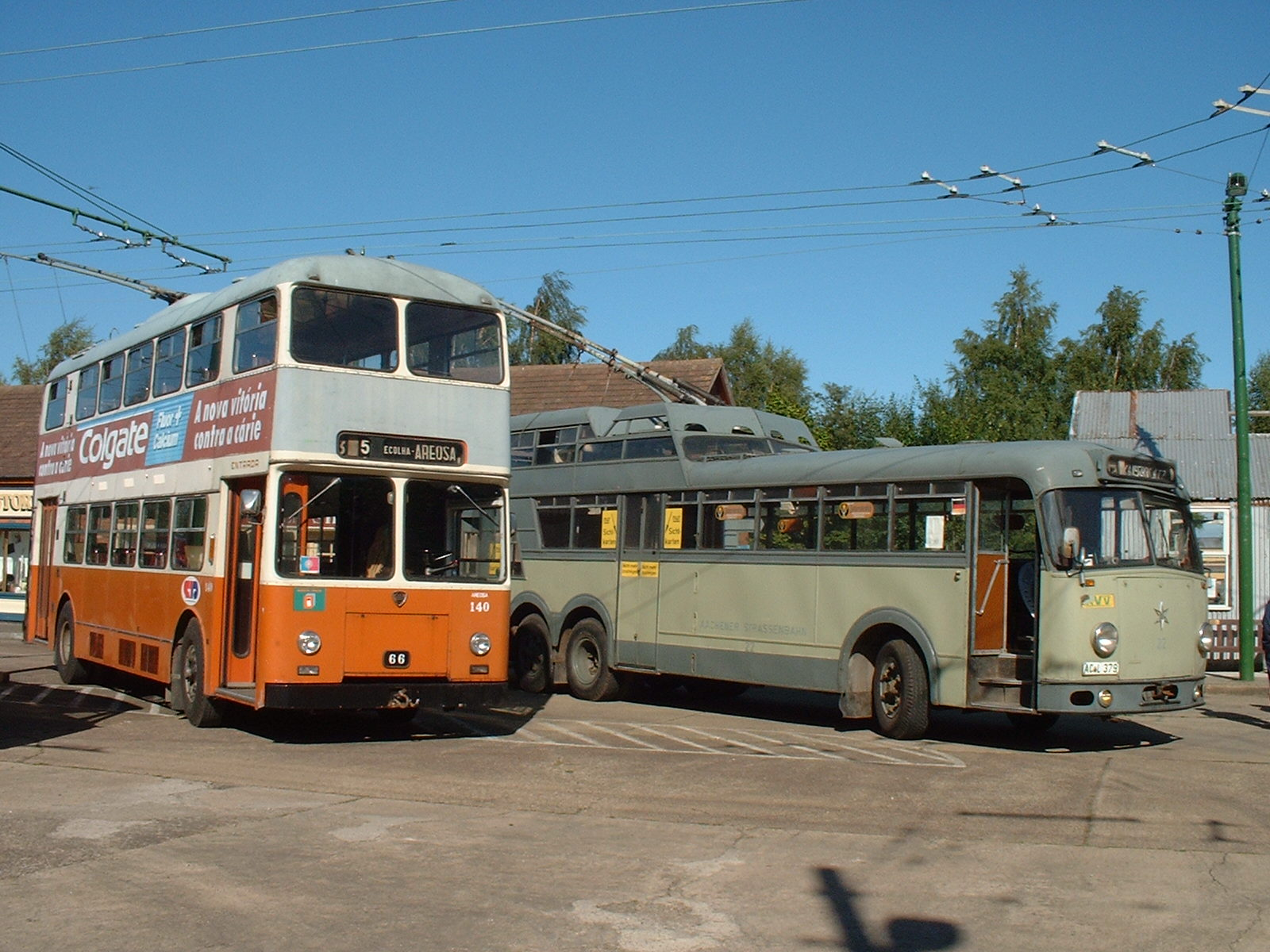
- Two of the museum's foreign vehicles from Porto and Aachen

- Location within Lincolnshire
- Established: 1969
- Location: Sandtoft, Lincolnshire, England
- Coordinates: 53°33′54″N 0°52′14″W
- Type: Transport museum
- Website: sandtoft.org

The Trolleybus Museum at Sandtoft is a transport museum which specialises in the preservation of trolleybuses. It is located by the village of Sandtoft, near Belton on the Isle of Axholme in the English county of Lincolnshire.

== Description ==
The museum occupies part of the former RAF Sandtoft, an operational bomber airfield during World War II. RAF Sandtoft was disposed of by the Royal Air Force in 1958 and the site was acquired for the museum in November 1969. Since that time, volunteers have transformed a barren site into a museum with the addition of workshop, vehicle depot and exhibition building. The first event held was the Sandtoft Gathering in 1971, an event which is still held annually.

The museum is recognised as having the largest collection of preserved trolleybuses in Europe, if not the world, with over 60 examples. Whilst the exhibits are predominantly from the United Kingdom, a collection of international examples is growing at the museum. Apart from trolleybuses and transport, the museum also features a collection of 1950s/60s memorabilia. Over the years, many items related to the trolleybus era have been donated. A 1950s/1960s street scene features shop windows, complete with displays, whilst the prefabriacted utility bungalow, previously used as the museum's souvenir shop, has now been fitted out as a home to show even more of these period artefacts.

In 2011, the museum was the largest trolleybus museum in Britain, housing some 50 vehicles, including some imported from abroad, and about half of this number could be used to give rides to the public over an oval two-way circuit. By 2019, the number of vehicles had increased to over 60. The museum is open on selected days only, as detailed on its website.

== History ==
=== Conception ===
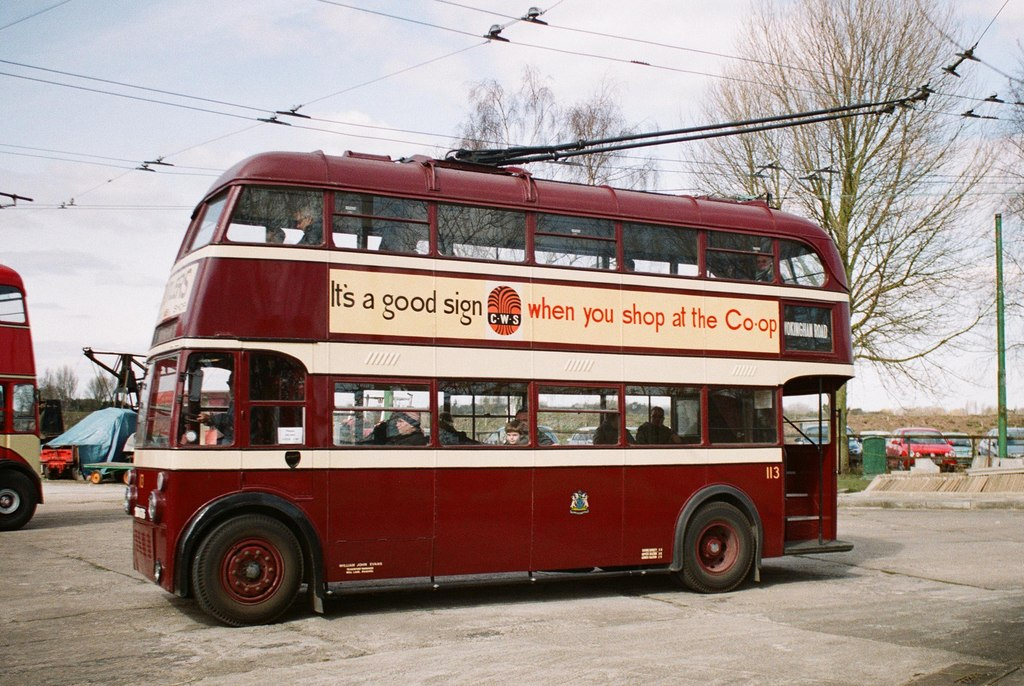
Reading AEC 661T trolleybus 113

The history of the museum really began in 1961, when a group of 14 people decided they would try to preserve one of Reading's pre-war AEC trolleybuses, which was soon to be withdrawn. They formed the Reading Transport Society in April, and when they acquired Reading No.113 in September, it was the first trolleybus to be privately preserved in Britain, and started the preservation movement. What was expected to be a purely local affair escalated, as members signed up from around Britain, and by 1964 they were custodians of three more trolleybuses from other British systems. The storage facilities they had for the vehicles were inadequate, and they started to look around for somewhere which could provide covered accommodation for the collection, and also the chance to operate them.

After a failure to find a suitable site in the south, Mike Dare, one of the founder members, reported that he might have found a suitable site at Belton. It was an old chapel, and he thought that it could hold three vehicles initially, but with some alterations, could hold eight. There was an attached classroom, suitable for holding small exhibits, and the possibility of purchasing an adjoining field at a later date. He intended to buy the chapel himself, and once he had done so, structural alterations were made to allow trolleybuses to enter the building. It became known as Westgate Trolleybus Museum, and the first vehicle, Derby No.172, was moved there on 27 July 1967. The second vehicle to arrive was Manchester No.1344, which was owned by the Northern Trolleybus Society. It was towed from Oldham by an elderly coach over the night of 28–29 July 1967, and two of the crew noticed that part of Sandtoft airfield was for sale. The third vehicle to enter the museum was Glasgow No.TB78, which was towed from Ibrox to Westgate on 24–25 October 1967 by the same elderly coach.

During 1968, Mike Dare visited the Sandtoft site several times, which was for sale at £6,000. It appeared that planning permission for a depot and overhead wiring was likely to be granted, and Reading Transport Society agreed to pursue this. Following the closure of the Reading system, the society obtained Reading No.144, and this was towed to Westgate on 23 November 1968, while Glasgow No.TB78 was moved to a nearby yard in Belton. The society also obtained a number of overhead wiring components from the system. Attention turned to how to raise the money for the Sandtoft site, for which Mike Dare had now offered £3,000. By February 1969, planning permission for the wiring and buildings had been granted, and Mike Dare suggested that he buy the site, and rent space to the society. Since they were hoping to build accommodation for 20 vehicles, he would offer spaces to other preservation groups, on a "first come first served" basis. By March, the offer of £3,000 for the site had been accepted, and a quote for the buildings suggested they would cost around £5,800. Dorothy Dare, Mike's mother, offered to lend £4,500 to finance much of the building phase, and did so after a brief period when legal obstacles meant that the offer was temporarily withdrawn.

=== Realisation ===
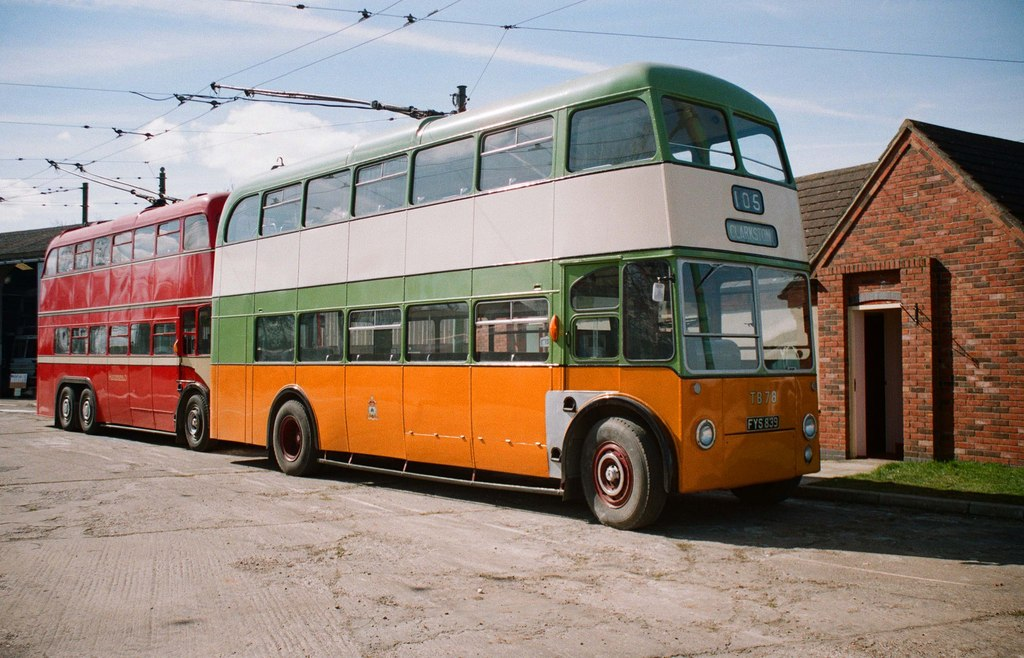
Glasgow BUT 9613T trolleybus TB78

Mike Dare took ownership of the site on 25 August 1969, by which time the size of the proposed depot had been reduced to eight vehicles. Building of the depot was delayed but began on 6 October 1969. In preparation for its completion, a number of trolleybuses were towed to a yard in Belton owned by Barry Dodd. The West Riding Transport Society wanted to be part of the project, and space was allocated for two of their vehicles, as did the Doncaster Omnibus and Light Railway Society, who owned Doncaster No.375. The initial building work was completed in late October, and on the afternoon of 1 November 1969, Reading No.193, owned be a member of the Reading Society, became the first trolleybus to arrive at the site. Huddersfield Nos.619 and 631, both owned by the West Riding Transport Society, arrived later that day, as did Glasgow No.TB78, which was owned by the Reading Society. Bradford No.RT410, owned by Graham Rhodes, Bournemouth 212, owned by the Reading Society, Reading 181, privately owned by a member of the Reading Society, and Doncaster 375, owned by the Doncaster Society, arrived soon afterwards, resulting in the depot holding its full complement of vehicles. Huddersfield No.541, owned by the National Trolleybus Association, also arrived and had to be stored in the open.

In December 1969, four transport groups met together, and became participating societies. They were the Doncaster Omnibus and Light Railway Society, the Notts & Derby Transport Society, the Reading Transport Society, and the West Riding Transport Society. The Reading Society then approached the Transport Trust for a loan of £5,000, to fund a second depot for 14 more vehicles and some overhead wiring components. Following legal advice, a trust was set up to hold the assets of the museum, to be known as the Sandtoft Transport Centre Association. They would lease the site to the participating societies, to put the enterprise on a firm financial footing, and Graham Rhodes was appointed as the site Foreman. Following the closure of the Walsall system, the Reading Society bought two trolleybuses, 1 mile (1.6 km) of overhead wiring, and forty traction poles, and since the main focus of their attention was now at Sandtoft, they changed their name to the British Trolleybus Society from 29 April 1971, exactly ten years after the original society had been formed.

=== Development ===
The project grew fairly rapidly, with trolleybuses and some diesel buses arriving from many locations. A second building housing 14 vehicles was erected in 1972, another for 22 more vehicles in 1973, and covered space for ten vehicles has been added subsequently. Other buildings were added, including a workshop, a toilet block, a souvenir shop, stores and a theatre. Upgrading of the toilets and the construction of a new exhibition hall were funded by grants in 1995–1996, and the new hall, known as the Axholme Stores now houses a cafe.

In order to allow the exhibits to operate, overhead wiring began to be erected in 1971, and the first trolleybus ran under the wires on 3 September 1972. Power was supplied by a diesel generator on the back of a Scammell lorry. This was replaced by a diesel bus engine driving a trolleybus motor acting as a generator, again all mounted on the back of a lorry, until in the 1990s power was obtained from a mains electricity supply. The vehicles in the collection have not remained static, with some moving on to other collections, some moving away to be restored elsewhere, some returning after a period away, and a few of the privately owned ones being scrapped.

The organisation of the museum has developed too. The Doncaster Omnibus and Light Railway Society are still active participants, as are the renamed British Trolleybus Society, but the West Riding Transport Society was wound up, and its assets transferred to the British Trolleybus Society. The Notts & Derby Transport Society also ceased to be in the mid-1970s, but the end of trolleybus operation in Bradford resulted in the formation of the Bradford Trolleybus Association, and they have since become an active participant. The Sandtoft Transport Centre Association became the Sandtoft Transport Centre Limited in 1982, a charitable company registered with the Charities Commission. Most of the development of the site has been privately funded, and the standard of the work and organisation was recognised in 2003, when the museum achieved registered museum status.

In 2002 it was rebranded from the Sandtoft Transport Centre. Further progress was made in 2010, when it was awarded Accreditation status by the Museums, Libraries and Archives Council, now part of Arts Council England.

In August 2026, a 290 metre 7.25 inch railway line opened as the Sandcroft & District Railway with rolling stock and track from the former Ise Valley Railway in Northamptonshire.

== The collection ==
The museum houses a wide range of trolleybuses. Of the 59 listed on its website in 2019, 28 were owned by the Sandtoft Trust, 13 by the British Trolleybus Society, one each by the Bradford Trolleybus Association, the Doncaster Omnibus and Light Railway Society, the National Trolleybus Association, and the Rotherham Trolleybus Group, while 14 were privately owned. They originally ran on 31 different systems, eight of which were abroad, 21 were in England, one was in Scotland and one was in Wales. Ten of them were single deck vehicles, 47 were double deck, and two were just chassis. The oldest was a Mexborough and Swinton Traction Company vehicle, dating from 1928, while the newest was part of an experimental scheme by the South Yorkshire Passenger Transport Executive, and was built in 1985. One vehicle does not fit into most of these categories, as it is a replica of a single deck trolleybus originally built for the Keighley system in 1911, but built for the museum in the Czech Republic and delivered in 2019.

In addition to trolleybuses, 14 diesel buses are located at the museum, some of which are used to give tours around the locality on open days. The collection also includes some service vehicles, including four tower wagons, which were used to maintain the overhead wiring, the oldest of which dates from 1903 and was horse-drawn. Other ancillary vehicles include a pole crane, a Smith Electric Vehicles parcel van, three tractors and the lower saloons of two trams.

== See also ==
- Black Country Living Museum - with trolleybuses
- East Anglia Transport Museum - with trolleybuses
- National Tramway Museum
- Summerlee Heritage Park
- List of trolleybus systems in the United Kingdom

== Bibliography ==
- BTS (2017). "The History of the British Trolleybus Society". British Trolleybus Society. Archived from the original on 9 August 2017.
- Hall, Dave (January 2012a). "History Of The Reading Transport Society - Chapter 8" (PDF). British Trolleybus Society. Archived (PDF) from the original on 24 May 2020.
- Hall, Dave (February 2012b). "History Of The Reading Transport Society - Chapter 9" (PDF). British Trolleybus Society. Archived (PDF) from the original on 25 May 2020.
- Hall, Dave (September 2012c). "History Of The Reading Transport Society - Chapter 11" (PDF). British Trolleybus Society. Archived (PDF) from the original on 25 May 2020.
- Hall, Dave (October 2012d). "History Of The Reading Transport Society - Chapter 12" (PDF). British Trolleybus Society. Archived (PDF) from the original on 24 May 2020.
- Hall, Dave (May 2013). "History Of The Reading Transport Society - Chapter 14" (PDF). British Trolleybus Society. Archived (PDF) from the original on 24 May 2020.
- Lockwood, Stephen (2011). Trackless to Trolleybus: Trolleybuses in Britain. Adam Gordon. ISBN 978-1-874422-86-0.
- TMS (2019). "History of The Trolleybus Museum". The Trolleybus Museum at Sandtoft. Archived from the original on 7 December 2019.
- TMS (2019b). "Trolleybuses". Trolleybus Museum at Sandtoft. Archived from the original on 7 December 2019.
- TMS (2019c). "Motorbuses". Trolleybus Museum at Sandtoft. Archived from the original on 7 December 2019.
- TMS (2019d). "Other Vehicles". Trolleybus Museum at Sandtoft. Archived from the original on 7 December 2019.
