= Sandtoft Airfield =

Airfield in North Lincolnshire, England

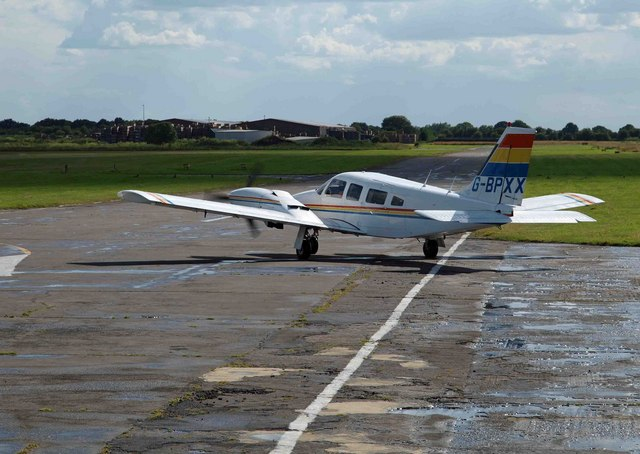
- IATA: none; ICAO: EGCF

Summary
- Airport type: Private
- Operator: e-plane Ltd
- Location: Scunthorpe, Lincolnshire, England
- Elevation AMSL: 13 ft / 4 m
- Coordinates: 53°33′35″N 000°51′30″W

Map
- Location in Lincolnshire

Runways
Direction	Length		Surface
Direction	m	ft	Surface
05/23	886	2,907	Tarmac
- Sources: UK AIP at NATS

Sandtoft Airfield (ICAO: EGCF), also known as Sandtoft Aerodrome, is in Belton, North Lincolnshire, England on the south side of the M180 motorway, approximately 12 mi (19 km) northeast of Doncaster, and 7 nautical miles (13 km; 8.1 mi) southwest of Scunthorpe. It is managed and operated by E-Plane Ltd.

== History ==
Sandtoft opened in February 1944 as a satellite for No 11 Base, RAF Lindholme in 1 Gp, Bomber Command. 1667 HCU and its Halifax bombers moved in from RAF Faldingworth on 20 February and was the only unit based at Sandtoft. 1667 HCU was also flying Lancasters I III from Sandtoft during 1945, Lancasters with airframe numbers JB306, HK734, HK740 and ME682 being some of them.

Placed on Care and Maintenance after the war, RAF Sandtoft was inactive when allocated to the USAF on 1 April 1953. The station was never occupied by American forces and returned to UK control on 8 September 1955 for disposal. The Sandtoft Flying Club uses part of the old peritrack as a runway.

== The airfield ==
Sandtoft Aerodrome has a CAA Ordinary Licence (Number P873) that allows flights for the public transport of passengers or for flying instruction as authorised by the licensee ( E-Plane Ltd). The aerodrome is not licensed on Weekdays.

Flying instruction at Sandtoft is provided by Yorkshire Aero Club who are based there for people to gain their PPL.
