= Isle of Axholme Rural District =

Former district in Lincolnshire, United Kingdom

Coordinates: 53.55°N 0.8°W

Isle of Axholme
- Isle of Axholme Rural District shown within Parts of Lindsey in 1970.
- Area
  - 1901: 28,070 acres (113.6 km^{2})
  - 1961: 51,104 acres (206.8 km^{2})
- Population
  - 1901: 6,680
  - 1971: 14,916
- History
  - Created: 1894
  - Abolished: 1974
  - Succeeded by: Boothferry
- Status: Rural district
  - HQ: Epworth

Isle of Axholme was a rural district in Lincolnshire, Parts of Lindsey from 1894 to 1974. It was formed under the Local Government Act 1894 based on the Lincolnshire parts of the Thorne rural sanitary district and two parishes of the Goole RSD (covering the northern part of the Isle of Axholme).

After the abolition of Crowle Urban District and taking in some parishes from the Gainsborough Rural District in 1936, it covered all of the Isle.

It was abolished in 1974 under the Local Government Act 1972 and went to form part of the Boothferry district of Humberside. Since 1996 it has been incorporated in the unitary authority of North Lincolnshire.

== Civil parishes ==
The rural district contained the following civil parishes over its existence:

- Althorpe (until 1958: merged with Keadby CP)
- Amcotts
- Belton
- Crowle (from 1936, previously a separate urban district)
- Eastoft
- Epworth
- Garthorpe
- Haxey (from 1936, previously in Gainsborough RD)
- Keadby (until 1958: merged with Althorpe CP)
- Keadby with Althorpe (formed by merger of 2 CPs in 1958)
- Luddington
- Owston Ferry (from 1936, previously in Gainsborough RD)
- West Butterwick (from 1936, previously in Gainsborough RD)
- Wroot
