= Luddington, Lincolnshire =

Village in North Lincolnshire, England

Coordinates: 53.640136°N 0.745386°W

Luddington
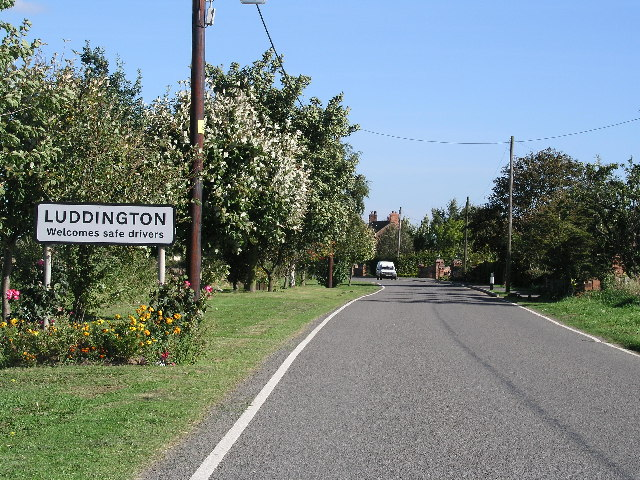
- Luddington village

- Location within Lincolnshire
- Population: 419 (2011)
- OS grid reference: SE830166
  - London: 150 mi (240 km) S
- Civil parish: Luddington and Haldenby
- Unitary authority: North Lincolnshire
- Ceremonial county: Lincolnshire
- Region: Yorkshire and the Humber
- Country: England
- Sovereign state: United Kingdom
- Post town: Scunthorpe
- Postcode district: DN17
- Police: Humberside
- Fire: Humberside
- Ambulance: East Midlands
- UK Parliament: Doncaster East and the Isle of Axholme

Luddington is a village and former civil parish, now in the parish of Luddington with Haldenby, on the Isle of Axholme in the North Lincolnshire district, in the ceremonial county of Lincolnshire, England. The population of the civil parish of "Luddington with Haldenby" at the 2011 census was 419. It is 6 miles (10 km) north-west from Scunthorpe, 6 miles south-east from Goole and 18 miles (29 km) north-east from Doncaster.

== History ==
After the last Ice Age Luddington was covered by Lake Humber, until about 9,000 BC. When the melt water lake finally disappeared the Luddington area became dry, surrounded by wetlands, on a branch of the River Don. Luddington was amongst the last of a chain of islands in the marshlands of the Isle of Axholme, stretching from Epworth northwards. The site of St Oswald's pre-conquest church sits on an island separated from the rest of the village and River Don, in a circular enclosure, suggesting it might have been a ritual site well into the first millennium.

At the time of the Domesday survey in 1086, Luddington was the most northerly of the parishes on the Isle of Axholme, and was a river island. The River Trent was to the east, the River Don to the west and north, and the Meredyke drain to the south.

In 1951 the parish had a population of 414. On 1 April 1983 the parish was abolished and merged with Haldenby to form "Luddington & Haldenby".

=== Middle Ages ===
The origin of the name Luddington is pure Old English suggesting that it was an Anglo-Saxon settlement or estate belonging to "Luda"; however the area was populated before the English settlement of the 5th century. Nearby Crowle developed as a market town, leaving Luddington, like Haldenby (a nearby deserted medieval village) as way stops on the river. The River Don was an important transport link between the Humber and the Yorkshire hinterland. The Northern Isle of Axholme has two other deserted Medieval settlements, Haldenby and Waterton, both close to Luddington.

=== Late Medieval decline ===
The Isle of Axholme as a whole went into decline in the late Medieval period. Climate change during the Little Ice Age saw the advance of marshlands, the dying of woodlands (which became bog oak) and the reduction of pasture. The river trade went into decline, partly because it silted, and partly because of the development of Hull, which took trade away from inland settlements. The Black Death also had an effect. When Vermuyden drained the Isle he removed productive marshland and the River Don.

=== Victorian revival ===
Controlled flooding of the Isle (warping) improved the fertility of the soil. Steam pumps made the drainage of the Northern Isle effective. This led to a growth in farming in the area and an increase in population. Luddington farmers developed crops, particularly potatoes, to feed the urban market. The need for labour was partly met by the migration of Irish workers to Luddington, following the Irish Famine of the 1840s. Providence Row, a collection of earth floor cottages, housed Irish labourers into the 1930s.

=== Post-Second World War ===
Two public houses that existed in Luddington closed: The Friendship in 1974, and The Blue Bell in 1994. The village post office closed at the turn of the 21st century, and the remaining public house, The Lincolnshire Arms, closed recently.

In 2006 the village hosted the Luddstock music festival.

== Geography ==
Luddington is situated at the northern edge of North Lincolnshire, on low-lying land which abuts the River Trent to the east. The B1392 road passes through the village centre, heading east to the bank of the Trent, and then turning south along the bank, and in the other direction, heading south-west and then west to reach Eastoft. A minor road heads north and then north-east to reach Garthorpe and Fockerby, once on opposite banks of the River Don, but since the diversion of the river as part of the drainage of Hatfield Chase, effectively one community. Just to the north of the village, a track leaves the road, providing a route to Haldenby Grange, near to which there was a railway station until 1965. The parish church is in fields to the north-east of the village centre.

The parish shares boundaries with Eastoft to the west and Garthorpe and Fockerby to the north-east. Both are in North Lincolnshire. Between them, the border is with Twin Rivers civil parish, containing the villages of Adlingfleet, Ousefleet and Whitgift, which are in the East Riding of Yorkshire. The county boundary is contiguous with the parish boundary. To the south-east is Amcotts, while Crowle is to the south-west. Between them is a short length of boundary with Keadby.

== Population ==
- 1801: 407
- 1811: 402
- 1821: 462
- 1831: 470
- 1841: 511
- 1851: 588
- 1861: 684
- 1871: 775
- 1881: 628
- 1891: 495
- 1901: 532
- 1911: 527
- 1921: 431
- 1931: 429
- 1941: N/A
- 1951: 425
- 1961: 414
- 1971: 379
- 1981: 351
- 1991: 360
- 2001: 402
- 2011: 419

== Landmarks ==
The parish church is a Grade II listed structure, built in 1855 in Gothic Revival style. The nave has four bays, with aisles to the north and south, and a porch adjoining the south aisle. The chancel has two bays, to which is attached a vestry, and at the western end there is a three-stage tower with an octagonal broach spire. Construction is of sandstone and limestone ashlar masonry, with the roofs clad in Welsh slate. Internally, there are several English church monuments which predate the construction, including a white marble Roccoco tablet to the Worsop family dating from 1758, a wall tablet to Elizabeth Lister dating from 1729, and a tablet commemorating Captain Augustus Webb, who died from wounds during the Charge of the Light Brigade at Balaclava in 1854. The building replaced an earlier medieval church, details of which are provided by an illustration made by C Nattes in 1794, and now in the collection of Lincoln City Library. It was cruciform in shape, with a wooden steeple.

Haldenby Grange is a Grade II listed farmhouse, dating from the middle to late eighteenth century. It is built of red-brown brick, with later alterations in a lighter-coloured brick, and has a pantiled roof. It was once close to the banks of the River Don, and formed part of the deserted medieval village of Haldenby. The village continued to the north-east, as far as Haldenby Hall, another listed building which dates from the late seventeenth century, altered in the mid-nineteenth century. It is T-shaped in plan, built from bricks in different colours, and with pantiles and Welsh slate roofs. It replaced the medieval Haldenby Hall, once the residence of the Haldenby family, who are commemorated by monuments in the church at Adlingfleet. Close to Haldenby Grange is a listed barn and horse mill.

Luddington's Catholic church is dedicated to St Joseph and St. Dymphna. Previously, there were two Methodist chapels, one erected by Welseyans in 1837, the other by Primitive Methodists in 1841, both now gone.

== Sports ==
Luddington has a long history with sports with football and cricket teams going back 100 years. The football team played in various leagues from the start of the 20th century up to folding in 2010. There is still a Sunday football side called "Duffs Dynamoes" that as of 2019 is celebrating its 35th consecutive year in the Scunthorpe and District Sunday Football league. Luddington Cricket Club has been going for over 100 years and are currently playing in the North Lindsey Cricket league. They won the division 1 title in 2018, becoming the smallest club in the league's history to lift the title.

Luddington also has a long history with darts, with players from the village winning county trophies in the past and also having players from the village being represented in the News of the World Darts Championship in the 1960s and 1970s. In the early 1980s the local pubs in Luddington came together to create the Ted Coulson Darts Trophy as a tribute to village darts player Ted Coulson, who was well known nationally in darts but passed away whilst playing a game of darts in Crowle. The trophy was competed for every January and was open to all darts players from Luddington or players playing for pub teams locally. The tournament took place each year up to 2010, when the last pub, The Lincolnshire Arms, closed its doors.

== Bibliography ==
- Cory, Vernon (1985). Hatfield and Axholme – An Historical Review. Providence Press. ISBN 0-903803-15-1.
