= Church of St Mary Magdalene, Whitgift =

Anglican church in Yorkshire, England

Church of St Mary Magdalene
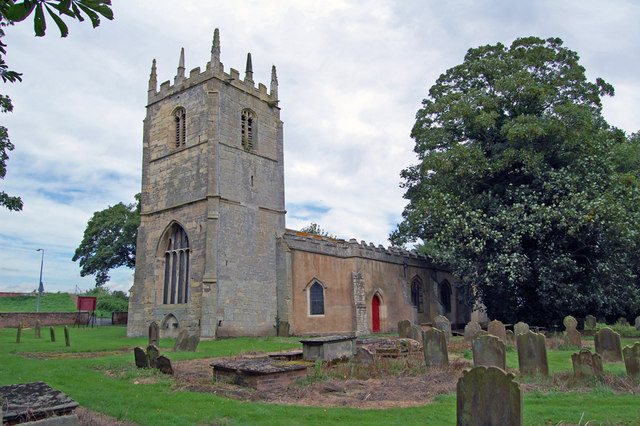
- Church of St Mary Magdalene
- 53.694°N 0.776°W
- OS grid reference: SE 808 227
- Location: Whitgift, East Riding of Yorkshire
- Country: England
- Denomination: Anglican

History
- Status: Parish church
- Founded: 1304
- Dedication: Mary Magdalene

Architecture
- Functional status: Active
- Style: Perpendicular

Administration
- Diocese: Sheffield
- Deanery: Snaith & Hatfield
- Benefice: The Marshland
- Parish: Whitgift St Mary Magdalene

Listed Building – Grade I
- Designated: 14 February 1967
- Reference no.: 1083151

The Church of St Mary Magdalene is an Anglican church in the hamlet of Whitgift, East Riding of Yorkshire, England. The church is noted for its clock which displays the number 13 in Roman numerals in what should be the 12 o'clock position – the only one in Britain to do so. The church itself is a grade I listed building, and the churchyard contains two grade II listed structures.

== History ==
William the Conqueror donated the entire area around Whitgift to the monastery of Selby Abbey, with Henry de Lacey donating what would be the churchyard area to the monks for building either a chapel or a church. The existing St Mary Magdalene structure is the second church to have existed on the site, the first, dating back to c. 1130 was ordered to be destroyed by the vicar of Adlingfleet, and its stones re-used in building the rectory at Adlingfleet. John le Franceys wanted the church to be demolished to stop its appropriation by Selby Abbey; this was done by at least 1291, but thought to have occurred around the middle of the 12th century. The first building owed its patronage to St Mary's Abbey in York, and the ecclesiastical authorities granted the people of Whitgift the rights to an annual fair and a weekly market, also with the establishment of the ferry. As such, the church was quite important on the tidal River Ouse, and was the setting for the yearly Feast of the Blessed Mary Magdalene, which existed before the second church on the site, so it is thought that both churches shared the same dedication.

The right of advowson was held by the local lords of the manor, however on the execution of Thomas of Lancaster, it reverted to the crown, then passing through St Mary's Abbey in York, before being described as being in the Parish of Snaith. In 1956, Lord Deramore who held the rights of advowson through the lineage, transferred this responsibility to the Bishop of Sheffield.

The current church dates back to 1304, and is largely Perpendicular in design, with the tower having internal facing brickwork. The actual date of the building of the church is known because of a document from the early 14th century, which is preserved in Selby Abbey, stating that Henry de Lacy granted to Selby Abbey:

...the cemetery in the vill of Wytegift consecrated a long time ago, as it is enclosed by ditches, as far as certain a place where our fair is held yearly at the feat of the Blessed Mary Magdalene, which church or chapel the present and future inhabitants in the vills of Ousefleet, Wytegift, Esstoft, Redenesse and Swynflet, and also the tenants of xi bovates of land in Folquardeby and xiii bovates of land in Haldenby which aforesaid vills are within the boundaries of the parish of Snayth, will hear divine office and will receive and have sacraments.

The 14th-century building was furnished with two upper stages on its tower, which were added in the 15th/16th centuries. These later stages have Perpendicular elements to their architecture, with the clock installed on the north side of the tower in 1919. The piers are octagonal, dating back to the 14th century, and the benches and pews date back to the 17th century. The arcade is in the Decorated style.

The south aisle was built in the Elizabethan era, and the church was renovated in the late 19th century when a new chancel was added, with the building being reconsecrated in 1899 by William Maclagan, the Archbishop of York. the extension during the reign of Elizabeth I was undertaken because of the connection of the church with John Whitgift, who was Archbishop of Canterbury between 1583 and 1604. Although John Whitgift's immediately family hailed from Grimsby, the family name derived wholly from the village.

The church building suffers from being so close to the River Ouse, the result being that parts of it have subsided. The chancel, added in the 19th century, seems to be sinking faster than the rest of the structure, and the tower, which has a side door in it, of which only half of the door is above ground level, the lower half having sunk into the ground. The church building was given grade I listed status in 1967.

The churchyard contains a grade II listed war memorial, a tombstone path on the south side of the church which is also grade II listed, and one Commonwealth War Grave. The clock on the north wall which dates back to 1919, displays a number 13 in Roman numerals in place of the standard number in the 12 position, and is thought to be accidental. The origin of the thirteenth clock position has differing backstories, but its unique nature within the British isles means it also gained notoriety. (Note: One story is that the person who painted the numerals on the clock face spent too much time in the local pub, which at that time was near the church. Another is that the clock hand would not locate correctly in the vertical position over the 12 o'clock mark, so another I was painted in further towards the one o'clock position. Weathering revealed the original number and so it looked like XIII.) During the Second World War, Lord Haw-Haw stated that German bombers flying up the Humber Estuary would be flying so low that they would "...be able to see the thirteenth hand [sic] of Whitgift church clock." (Note: Haw-Haw mentions a thirteenth hand, but the clock only has two hands, and a thirteenth position. Additionally, the church is upriver from where the Trent meets the Ouse, traditionally this point is where the Humber estuary starts.) Besides the early 20th-century clock, there is another 17th-century clock in the nave, and the tower has three bells. The external clock, which carries an inscription of In terra pax (Latin: peace on earth), was made by Potts of Leeds.

== Parish and benefice ==
St Mary Magdalene is part of The Marshland Benefice, in the Deanery of Snaith and Hatfield, in the Diocese of Sheffield. Historically the church was a perpetual curacy in the Deanery of Pontefract and in the Diocese of York.

== See also ==
- Grade I listed churches in the East Riding of Yorkshire
- Listed buildings in Twin Rivers, East Riding of Yorkshire
