= Garthorpe, Lincolnshire =

Village in North Lincolnshire, England

Coordinates: 53.660494°N 0.718633°W

Garthorpe
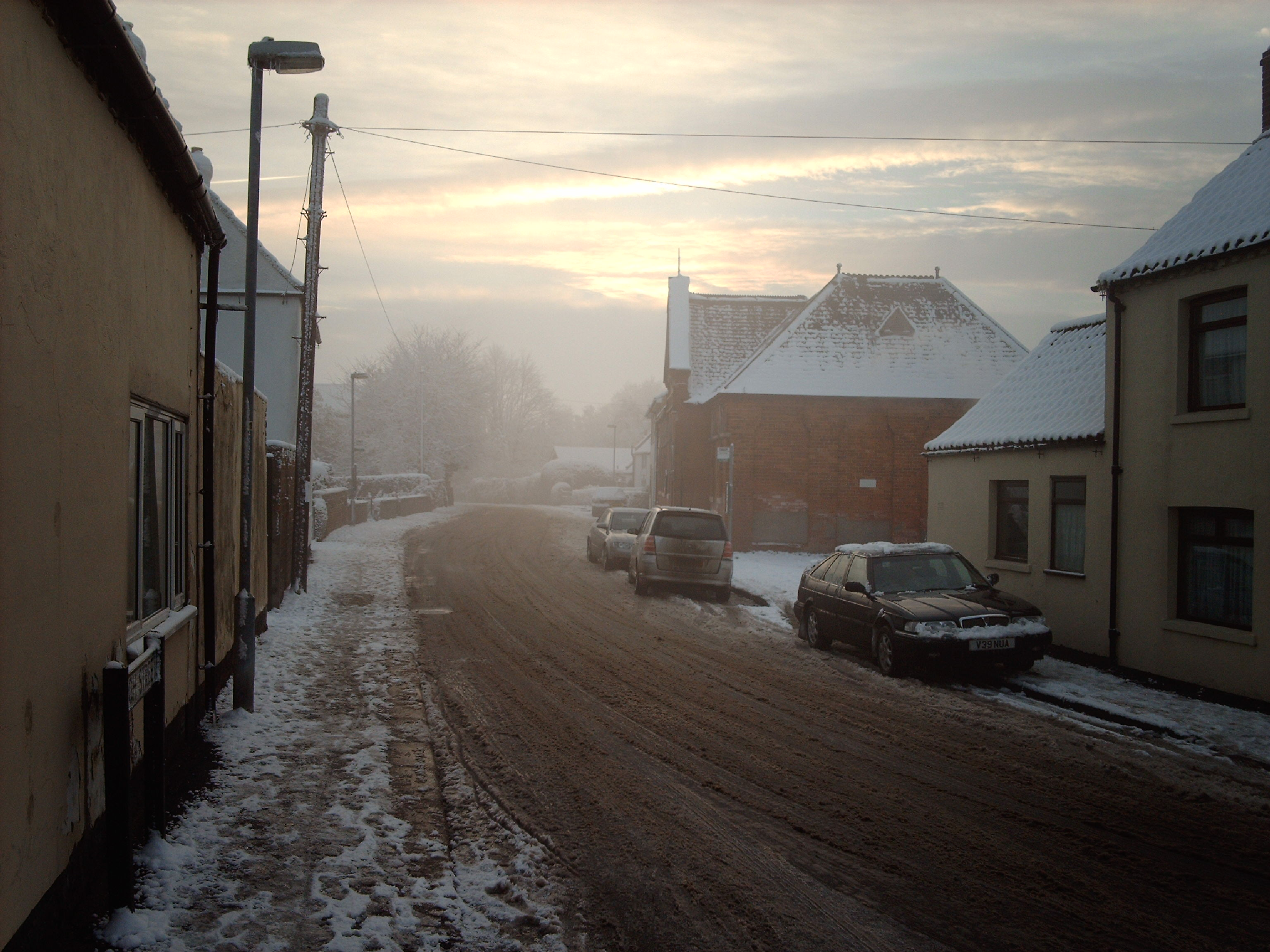

- Location within Lincolnshire
- Population: 446 (2021)
- OS grid reference: SE847189
  - London: 150 mi (240 km) S
- Civil parish: Garthorpe and Fockerby
- Unitary authority: North Lincolnshire
- Ceremonial county: Lincolnshire
- Region: Yorkshire and the Humber
- Country: England
- Sovereign state: United Kingdom
- Post town: SCUNTHORPE
- Postcode district: DN17
- Police: Humberside
- Fire: Humberside
- Ambulance: East Midlands
- UK Parliament: Doncaster East and the Isle of Axholme

Garthorpe is a village in the North Lincolnshire, England. It is situated approximately 8 miles (13 km) south-east from Goole, 1 mile (1.6 km) west from the River Trent, and in the Isle of Axholme.

It was previously a civil parish in its own right, but now forms part of a civil parish with its contiguous Fockerby. The civil parish, named Garthorpe and Fockerby, had 446 residents in the 2021 census.

== Geography ==
Garthorpe is located on low-lying land about 1 mile (1.6 km) to the west of the River Trent. Fockerby is immediately to the west, and the two places now form one community. Three minor roads radiate from the village centre. That to the north leads to Adlingfleet, while the road to the south-west leads to Luddington. A third road heads eastwards, and used to serve the ferry to Burton upon Stather, but now stops short of the banks of the Trent. It turns to the south, and follows the western bank of the river. West of the road and the river is the site of the deserted medieval village of Waterton.

== History ==
Before the seventeenth century, the River Don, its waters swelled by those of the River Idle and the River Torne, crossed the region on a meandering course from Crowle to Adlingfleet, where it entered the River Trent. However, in 1626, the Dutch drainage pioneer Cornelius Vermuyden re-routed all three rivers as part of the drainage of Hatfield Chase. Prior to the work, Garthorpe lay on the east bank of the Don in Lincolnshire while Fockerby lay in Yorkshire.

Before the opening of the Keadby Road and rail bridge in 1916, there existed a boat ferry from the east end of the village along Shore Road to Burton upon Stather across the River Trent.

From 1903, the village was served by Fockerby railway station. This had been built by the Goole and Marshland Light Railway Company, whose line left the main Doncaster to Goole line at Marshland Junction near Goole, and reached Fockerby by way of Reedness Junction, Eastoft and Luddington. The line was taken over by the North Eastern Railway and the Lancashire and Yorkshire Railway in early 1903, and became the Axholme Joint Railway. They also took over the Isle of Axholme Light Railway, which provided a connection from Reedness Junction to Haxey Junction. The station was initially named Garthorpe, but then became Fockerby. Passenger services were withdrawn in 1933, and the line closed to freight on 5 April 1965. Four days before closure, the North Axholme Secondary School at Crowle chartered a 4-car diesel multiple unit, and traversed the entire line, apart from the route south of Epworth which had been closed in 1956. The train was met at Fockerby by the headmistress and all of the pupils from Garthorpe County Primary School. Incoming freight traffic on the line included manure and coal, while most outgoing traffic was agricultural produce, including potatoes and tulips.

Garthorpe is barely above sea level - and is about 1 mile from the tidal river Trent protected by large levees. Positioned midway between Goole and Scunthorpe, transport to and from must be by car. A local bus service is available.

The former primary school closed in the mid 1970s necessitating a council funded bus service to the Luddington and Garthorpe infants and primary school in Luddington, 2 miles (3.2 km) south of the Village. The secondary school for the catchment area is The Axholme Academy, 7 miles (11 km) away.

In 2011, there was a local pub called the Bay Horse, but no shops. The Methodist Chapel closed at the end of 2010, and the local Anglican Church was also under threat. The village also had another pub called the 'Plough Inn' which closed in 1918. In the 1860s, this had two signs, one showing the "Plough", and the other showing "Red Lion". There was also a public house situated adjacent to the River Trent where the ferry crossed to Burton upon Stather. This was called the "Sheffield Arms" on a map of 1886, and "The Webbs Hotel" by 1907. Both The Plough and Webbs Hotel closed in 1916.

During the 18th century, the local area was frequented by two notable highwaymen. Ned Mandrell was the earliest, and was said to have been a ruthless villain who was scared by none. It is thought that he was captured and hung and his remains buried at the southern end of Carr Lane, where the grass triangle is situated. The other was Snowden Dunhill, who lived much of his life in the village of Spaldington near Howden. His main hiding area was a place called Cow Lane, a local common pasture which everybody crossed as means as a short cut between the villages. After he was finally captured and sentenced at York Assizes, he was transported to Tasmania, Australia. When he had spent his time of hard labour and was due to be released, he died and never returned to be with the family who was waiting for him.

== Governance ==
Garthorpe was formerly a township in the parish of Luddington, in 1866 Garthorpe became a civil parish, on 1 April 1983 the parish was abolished to form "Garthope & Fockerby" and Twin Rivers. In 1961 the parish had a population of 323.

== Gallery ==
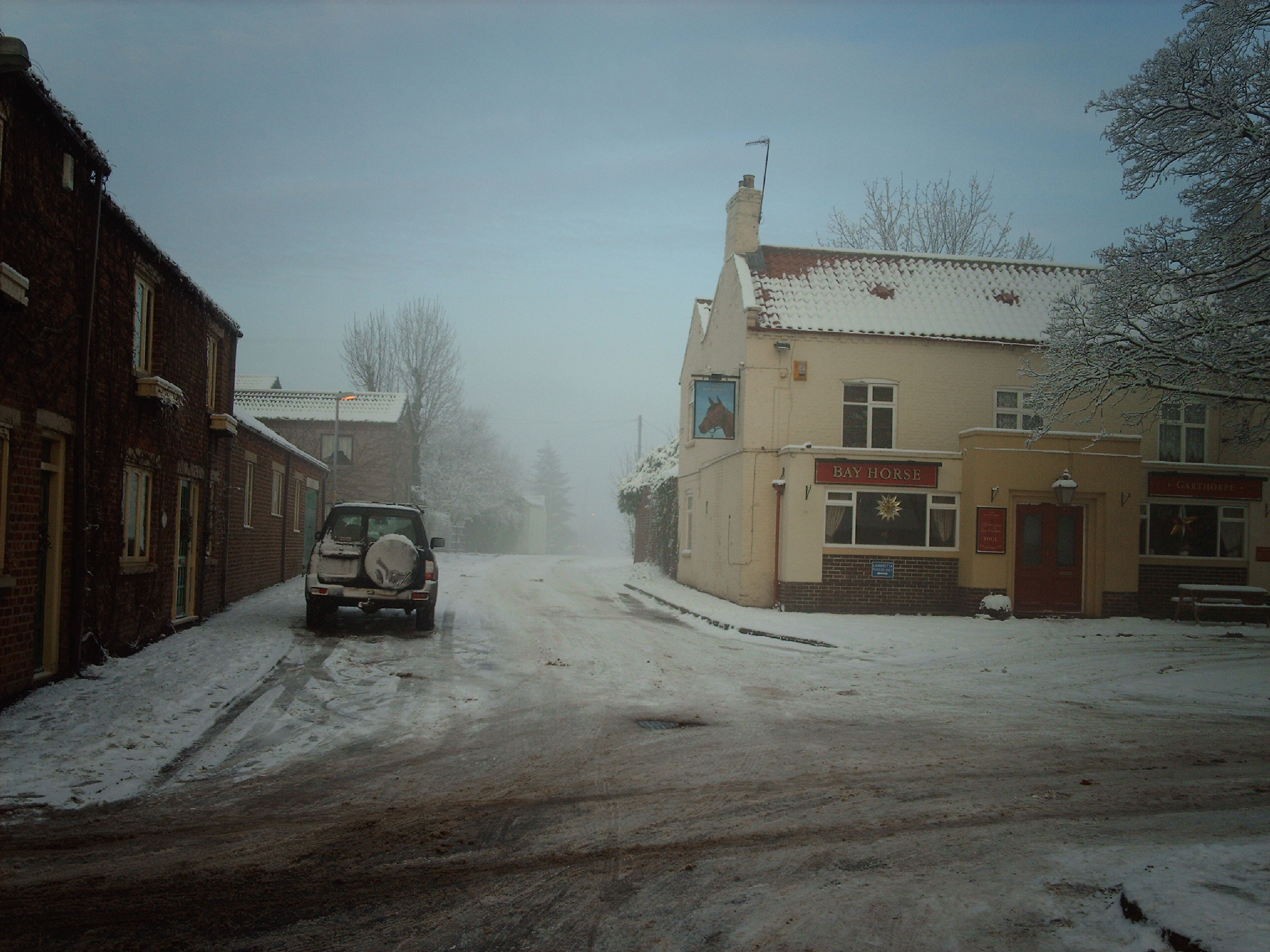

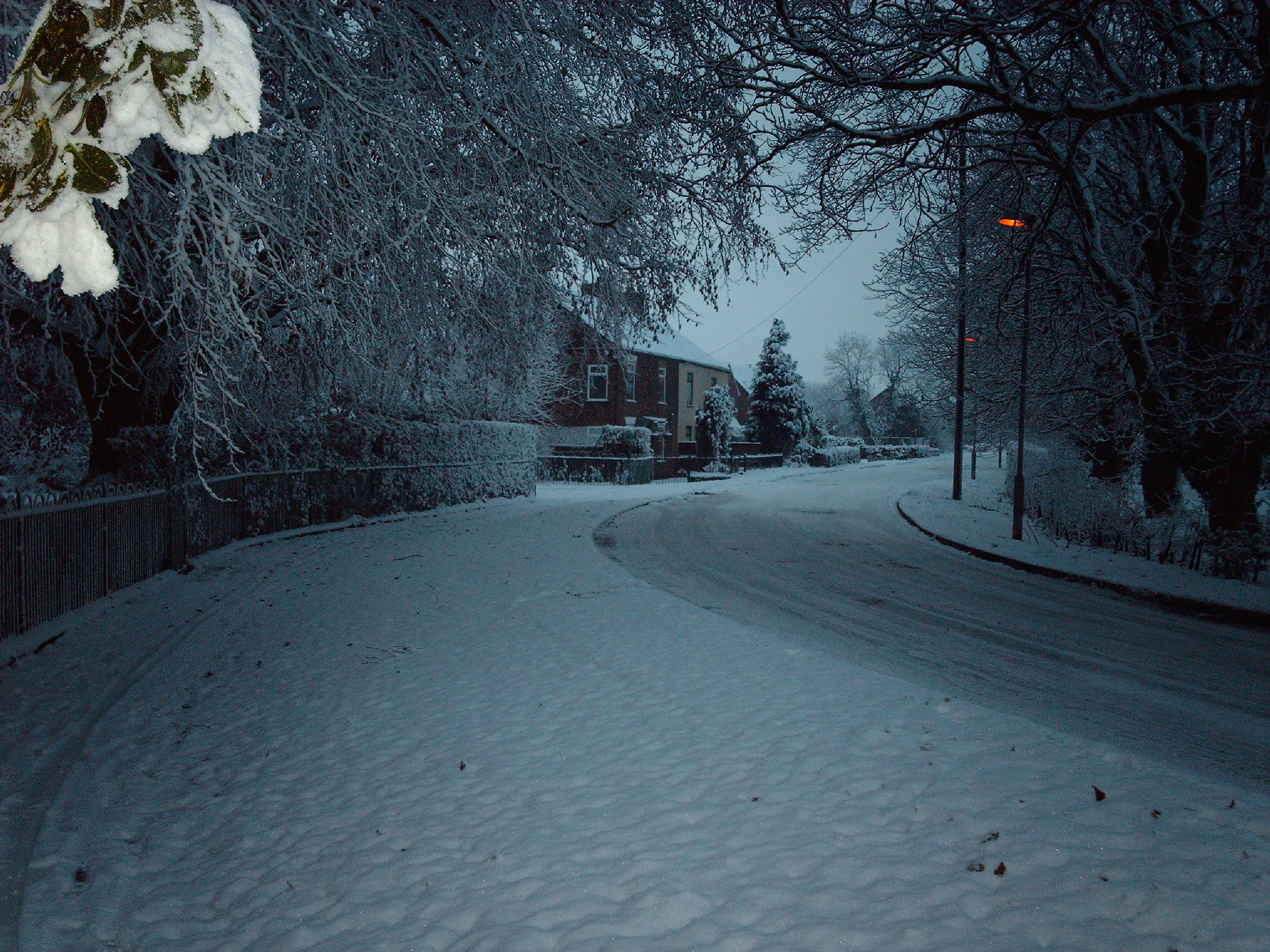

== Bibliography ==
- Cory, Vernon (1985). Hatfield and Axholme – An Historical Review. Providence Press. ISBN 0-903803-15-1.
- Judge, C.W. (1994). The Axholme Joint Railway. Oakwood Press. ISBN 978-0-85361-441-8.
