= Garthorpe =

Garthorpe may refer to the following places in England:

- Garthorpe, Leicestershire
- Garthorpe, Lincolnshire
