= Eastoft =

Village and civil parish in North Lincolnshire, England

Coordinates: 53.636307°N 0.784424°W

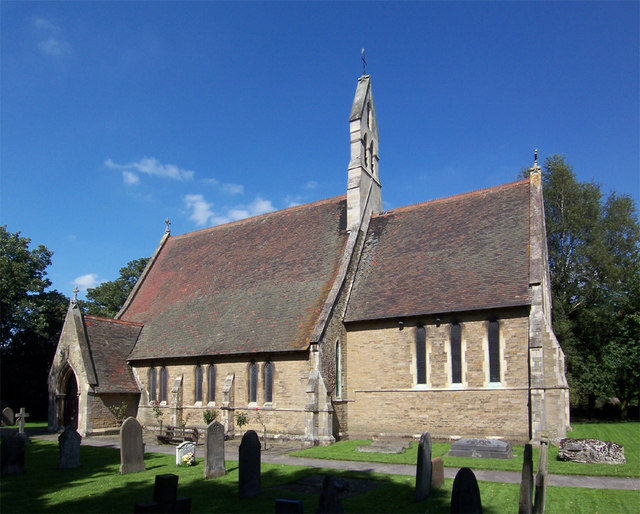
- Church of St Bartholomew, Eastoft

- Location within Lincolnshire
- Population: 431 (2011)
- OS grid reference: SE804162
  - London: 145 mi (233 km) S
- Unitary authority: North Lincolnshire
- Ceremonial county: Lincolnshire
- Region: Yorkshire and the Humber
- Country: England
- Sovereign state: United Kingdom
- Post town: Scunthorpe
- Postcode district: DN17
- Dialling code: 01724
- Police: Humberside
- Fire: Humberside
- Ambulance: East Midlands
- UK Parliament: Doncaster East and the Isle of Axholme

Eastoft is a village and civil parish in North Lincolnshire, England. It is situated within the Isle of Axholme, 3 miles (5 km) north-east from Crowle, and on the A161 road.

The 2001 census recorded a parish population of 378, increasing to 431 at the 2011 census.

Eastoft is historically on the border of Yorkshire and Lincolnshire, the River Don flowed through the village. The Yorkshire side of the village for centuries was part of the ancient parish of Adlingfleet within the Wapentake of Osgoldcross in the historic county of Yorkshire West Riding.

== History ==
Specialists note the oldest mentions for Eastoft (Lincolnshire and West Riding of Yorkshire) Eschetoft around 1170, Esketoft around 1200 and Esktoft 13th century and suggest an Old Scandinavian origin, with the name formed from eski "ash tree" and toft (< Old Norse topt) "a homestead, the site of a house and its out-buildings", sometimes toft may also signify "a settlement site and its accompanying land". On this basis, it would mean "Homestead, house or curtilage where ash trees are growing". The difficulty to articulate the group /skt/ and the attraction of the common word East- explain the final evolution Eastoft. On this basis, it was finally understood as "Homestead with enclosure to the east of Crowle. Toft is sometimes associated with tree names. Similar place names in Normandy include Ectot-l'Auber and Ectot-lès-Baons (Eschetoth, Esketoth 1074). from eski "ash-tree" and toft. Eshetoftes, YWR, Eshetoftes 1158–67. < OE æsċ "ash-tree", is the Anglo-Scandinavian version of this place name.

The earliest known record of Eastoft dates from 1164, when there was a dispute between the Vicar of Adlingfleet and the abbot of Selby. Both claimed rights to the tithes from Reedness and Eastoft, and the dispute was settled when the Archbishop of York intervened, and ruled that the vicar of Adlingfleet should receive the tithes during his lifetime, but that he should make a payment of 40 shillings each year to the Abbey at Selby.

Eastoft became a separate parish on 25 September 1855, when it was created from parts of Adlingfleet and Crowle. In 1900 Kelly's Directory noted that although it was a single ecclesiastical parish, it was still two civil parishes, known as Eastoft, Yorkshire and Eastoft, Lincolnshire. The area of the parish was listed as 1,327 acres (537 ha) in Yorkshire and 1,312 acres (531 ha) in Lincolnshire. At the time, the church, the school and the vicarage were all in Yorkshire, and there were two halls. William Coulman was a Justice of the Peace and lived in Eastoft Hall, Yorkshire, while William Halkon lived at Eastoft Hall, Lincolnshire. The plantation next to Halkon's residence had once housed a chapel of ease and a burial ground, but all traces of them had gone by 1900.

The River Don used to run directly through the middle of the village, on its route to its confluence with the River Trent near Adlingfleet. However, in 1626, Cornelius Vermuyden began the drainage of Hatfield Chase, and re-routed the river northwards from Stainforth to join the River Aire. He also re-routed the River Idle and the River Torne, both of which joined it at Sandtoft and contributed to its flow. Parts of the original course are marked on modern maps, one to the south-west and the other to the north-east of the village, and their orientation points to the presence of several large meanders in the vicinity. Before the drainage, the quality of the soil was poorer than soils on the higher areas of the Isle of Axholme. Land in Epworth, Haxey and Owston Ferry could be used for growing crops every year, but in Crowle and Eastoft, crops were normally grown for three years, and the land was left fallow for the fourth.

The Paupers Drain to the south of Eastoft predates the works of Vermuyden. Following his work, there was social unrest, which was not finally resolved until 1717. After that, some improvements to the drainage of the area were made, including a new sewer, which crossed the Pauper's Drain, and was designed to remove water from Eastoft, Crowle and Luddington. It drained into the River Trent through a sluice at Keadby, but the sluice failed in 1761, resulting in devastating floods.

Between 1903 and 1965, the village was served by Eastoft railway station on the Fockerby branch of the Axholme Joint Railway, although passenger services ended in 1933. The station was by the main road over 1.5 miles (2.4 km) to the north of the village, and the first sod was cut on 22 September 1898 by William Halkon of Eastoft Hall, the chairman of the directors, on land which was part of Boltgate Farm and belonged to Mr. Bramhill. Following the ceremony, toasts were made in the farmhouse. One of the contractors' locomotives used in the building of the line was named Halkon, after the chairman, and was used to convey a special train when the North Eastern Railway inspected the line, before taking it over from the original company. At the time, only Eastoft station was finished, and was cited as an example of how the others should be completed. The final train carrying passengers was chartered by North Axholme Secondary School and ran on 1 April 1965, four days before closure. The opening of the crossing gates over the A161 road at Eastoft was featured in television coverage of the event.

== Geography ==
The village is a linear settlement along the A161 between Crowle and Goole, and includes a junction with the B1392 road leading to the village of Luddington. It comprises more than 2,600 acres (11 km^{2}), and for the most part is little above sea-level. The parish is drained by a network of drainage ditches, which feed into the Adlingfleet Drain, running north-eastwards from the site of the railway crossing on the A161, and by the Pauper's Drain, running eastwards along the southern edge of the parish.

The north-western edge of the parish is bordered by the parishes of Twin Rivers and Reedness, and this boundary is also the border between East Riding of Yorkshire and North Lincolnshire. To the east is Luddington, part of the civil parish of Luddington and Haldenby, and to the south is Crowle.

Roughly 2 kilometres to the south-west of Eastoft village there is a nature reserve and Site of Special Scientific Interest called Eastoft Meadow. Meadows are a vanishing habitat in the British countryside with 97% of them destroyed since the 1930s As of 2019 the site is not open to the public.

== Landmarks ==
The Anglican parish church, which is dedicated to St Bartholomew, and was built in 1855 to the designs of J. Pearson, Esq., is a Grade II listed structure. It is built in Gothic Revival style and consists of a chancel with vestry on the north side, a nave with a porch on the south side and a bell gable, containing three bells. The church is situated on the Yorkshire side of the village and was consecrated by Thomas Musgrave, Archbishop of York, on 13 November 1855. The village has a Methodist church, which was built in 1869, and occupies a site which was once the bed of the River Don. In 1885 Kelly's Directory reported two chapels, a Primitive Methodist, and a Methodist New Connexion.

Eastoft Hall is another Grade II listed building, built on Eastoft High Street in 1789. It is built of red-brown brick, some of which is rendered, with a slate roof. The east front has four bays, and the building was modified in the early-19th century and in 1905. A screen wall, some outbuildings and an attached gardeners cottage are also included in the listing. There is a second building also called Eastoft Hall, on Luddington Road, finished in stucco with ashlar dressings, which was built in the mid-18th century and modified in the mid-19th century.

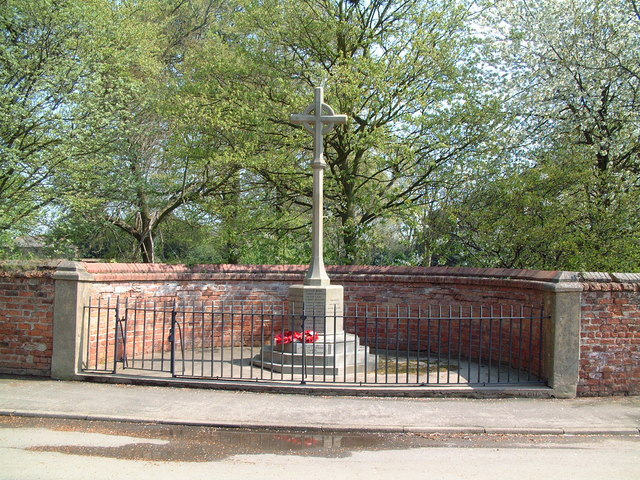
Eastoft War Memorial

To the south of the village stands a Church of England Primary School, which was opened by Mrs. R. H. Coulman on 28 November 1961. It was dedicated by Leslie Stannard Hunter, the Bishop of Sheffield, and is situated very close to the site of the original school, which was built in 1847, largely as a result of the efforts of the Vicar of Adlingfleet, Rev. F. Sugden. It was extended in both 1873 and 1902.

The village war memorial is sited in a semi-circular enclosure and bears the names of the men who gave their lives in the two World Wars.

Eastoft also has a village green, village hall, and The River Don public house. A post office-cum-corner shop closed in 2008, as part of cutbacks which involved the closure of 42 post offices in the region. It was replaced by a Post Office Outreach service, where post office services were provided in the Village Hall by a travelling post master, initially on Tuesday mornings and Thursday afternoons.

== Notable people ==
The actress Gina Bramhill was brought up on a farm in Eastoft.
