= Pauper's Drain =

Watercourse in north Lincolnshire, England

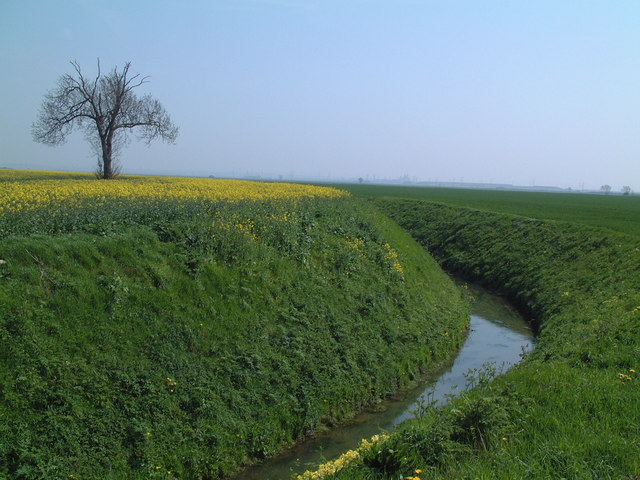
- Pauper's Drain, Crowle

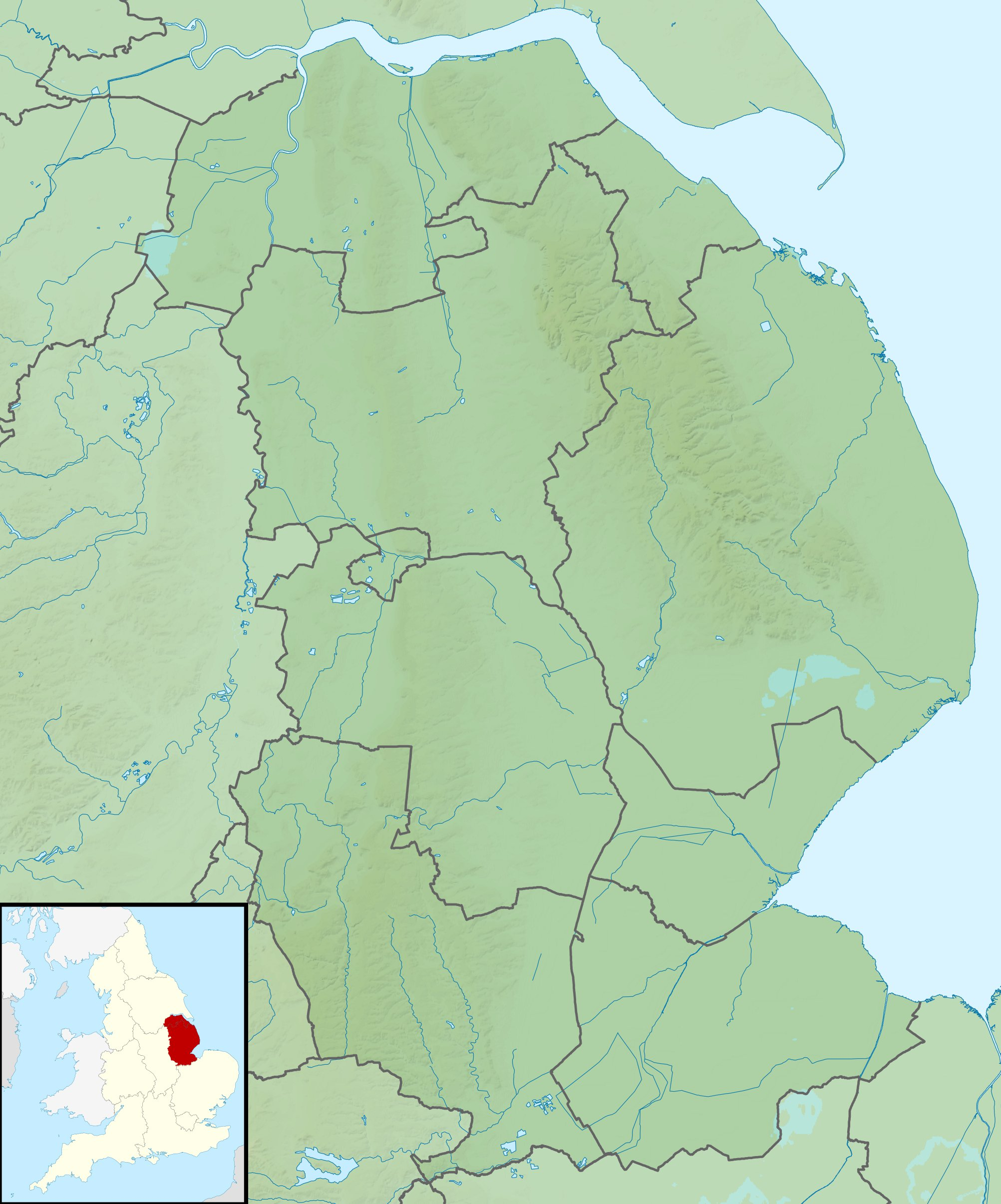
- Outfall to the River Trent shown in Lincolnshire

Location
- Country: England
- Counties: Lincolnshire

Physical characteristics
- Source
  - location: Crowle, Lincolnshire
  - coordinates: 53.6047°N 0.84381°W
- Mouth
  - location: Paupers Pumping Station, Amcotts, Lincolnshire
  - coordinates: 53.6277°N 0.71450°W
- Length: 9 km (5.6 mi)
- Basin size: 42 km^{2} (16 sq mi)

Basin features
- Tributaries
  - left: Common Carr Drain, Constable Drain
- Progression : Pauper's Drain—Trent—Humber

Pauper’s Drain is a small tributary of the River Trent in North Lincolnshire, England, and is 9 km (6 miles) long. (Note: Spelling of Pauper's Drain is as shown on Ordnance Survey maps)

It has a catchment area of 42 square kilometres(16 square miles) of flat arable, agricultural land to the east of the Isle of Axholme. The start of the drain is the outflow of the Crowle sewage treatment works; from there it flows in an eastwardly direction, south of the village of Eastoft before it reaches the Paupers pumping station at the side of the tidal River Trent, to the north of Amcotts. The station contains three pumps, which are used to maintain water levels in the drain by discharging water into the Trent as required. A sluice adjacent to the pumping station, also allows water to discharge by gravity during periods of tidal low water.

The watercourse is essential for the land drainage of this low-lying area, which is the responsibility of the Isle of Axholme & North Nottinghamshire Water Level Management Board, the successor body to the Isle of Axholme Internal Drainage Board. The Board undertakes maintenance tasks such as annual mowing and rodding of the drain.

The name is thought to be derived from the fact that it was constructed by labourers on the poor rate (or paupers). It was also considered to have been constructed prior to the 17th century drainage works of Vermuyden in the area.

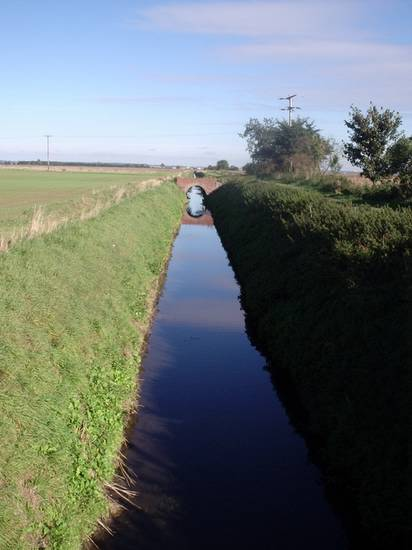
Pauper's Drain and Axholme Light Railway
