= Listed buildings in Twin Rivers, East Riding of Yorkshire =

Twin Rivers is a civil parish in the county of the East Riding of Yorkshire, England. It contains 23 listed buildings that are recorded in the National Heritage List for England. Of these, two are listed at Grade I, the highest of the three grades, two are at Grade II*, the middle grade, and the others are at Grade II, the lowest grade. The parish contains the villages of Adlingfleet and Whitgift, the hamlet of Ousefleet, and the surrounding countryside. Most of the listed buildings are houses and associated structures, farmhouses and farm buildings, and the others consist of two churches, tombstones in a churchyard, a war memorial and a lighthouse.

== Key ==
Grade	Criteria
I	Buildings of exceptional interest, sometimes considered to be internationally important
II*	Particularly important buildings of more than special interest
II	Buildings of national importance and special interest

== Buildings ==
Name and location	Photograph	Date	Notes	Grade
All Saints Church, Adlingfleet; 53.67871°N 0.72386°W		Late 12th century	The church has been altered and extended through the centuries. It is built in stone with some brick patching, partly rendered, and a slate roof. The church consists of a nave with a clerestory, north and south aisles, a south porch, north and south transepts, a chancel, a north vestry, and a west tower. The tower has two stages on a moulded plinth, diagonal buttresses, slit windows, a four-light west window with a hood mould, a turret at the head of the staircase, two-light bell openings with hood moulds, a moulded string course, gargoyles, and a coped embattled parapet. The south doorway is Norman, with two orders, and scrolled and stiff-lead capitals.	I
Stone building south of Church House; 53.67817°N 0.72405°W	—	13th century (probable)	The building is probably the remaining part of a medieval house, and contains a re-set 12th-century doorway with a chamfered round arch and a hood mould. It is in limestone and brick, it has a rectangular plan, and consists of a single room. The building had become a ruin, but has been restored.	II*
St Mary Magdelene's Church, Whitgift; 53.69450°N 0.77678°W		Early 14th century	The church, which was rebuilt on the site of an earlier church, has since been altered and extended, including a restoration in 1898–99. It is built in limestone and rendered brick, with a lead roof to the chancel, and slate roofs elsewhere. The church consists of a nave, north and south aisles, a chancel, and a west tower. The tower has three stages on a moulded plinth, angle buttresses, moulded string courses, a four-light west window, slit lights, a north clock face, two-light bell openings, and a coped embattled parapet with eight pinnacles, those on the corners crocketed. There are also embattled parapets on the body of the church.	I
Whitgift Hall and walls 53.69534°N 0.76472°W		c. 1700	A small country house, in red brick, partly stuccoed, with dressings in limestone and sandstone, chamfered quoins, a floor band, a deep eaves cornice, and a hipped Welsh slate roof. There are two storeys and a basement, a double depth plan, and five bays, the middle bay projecting and flanked by quoins. The doorway has fluted Ionic pilasters, an entablature with blocks, a frieze, a dentilled cornice, and a dentilled segmental pediment. The doorway has a radial fanlight. The windows are sashes in architraves, and there are three dormers, the middle one with an elliptically arched head. The south front has a porch with Doric columns, flanked by full-height semicircular bow windows. There are wing walls to the north front, and a screen wall to the south front.	II*
Forecourt piers, Whitgift Hall; 53.69573°N 0.76466°W	—	Early 18th century	The gate piers at the entrance to the grounds are in red brick with limestone dressings and a square plan. Each pier has a moulded plinth, a corniced band, a moulded cornice, and a flat cap with a square pedestal. There is an ornate carved scrolled limestone bracket to the adjoining wall.	II
Tombstones, St Mary Magdelene's Church, Whitgift; 53.69441°N 0.77675°W	—	Early to mid-18th century	The six tombstones in the churchyard, to the south of the church, have been re-set to form a path. They have inscriptions, incised decorations and motifs, and dates between 1711 and 1790.	II
Elm Tree Farmhouse; 53.67720°N 0.72383°W	—	Mid-18th century	The farmhouse, later divided into two houses, is in orange and yellow brick, with a moulded wooden eaves board, and roofs of pantile and tile with stone coped gables and shaped kneelers. There are two storeys and an attic, a double depth plan, a front of three bays, a slightly projecting staircase outshut on the rear, a narrow outshut on the left, a later wing on the left and a small canted addition on the right. The central doorway and the windows, which are sashes, are in architraves under stucco flat arches. At the rear is a round-headed stair window and horizontally siding sashes.	II
Inglenook; 53.69657°N 0.75943°W	—	Mid-18th century	The house is in red-brown brick, whitewashed on the front, with a dentilled brick eaves cornice, and a pantile roof with tumbled-in brick to the raised gables. There are two storeys and two bays. On the front is a gabled porch and a doorway with a segmental arch, and the windows are casements, most under segmental arches.	II
Sundial south of Whitgift Hall; 53.69519°N 0.76460°W	—	18th century	The sundial is in a flower bed in the garden to the south of the house, and is in limestone. It has a circular moulded base on which is a baluster-shaped shaft with foliate carving in relief, and the neck is splayed out to a moulded top. The dial and gnomon are in brass, and the dial is inscribed.	II
East View Farmhouse; 53.67929°N 0.72364°W		Mid to late 18th century	The farmhouse is in red brick, with stone dressings, a dentilled brick eaves cornice, and a hipped pantile roof. There are two storeys, a double depth plan, and three bays. The central doorway has a fanlight, a cornice and a hood, and the windows are sashes in architraves under channelled wedge lintels with fluted keystones.	II
Barn northwest of East View Farmhouse; 53.67953°N 0.72379°W	—	Mid to late 18th century	The threshing barn is in brown brick, with stepped eaves, and a pantile roof with tumbled-in brick to the raised gables. There is a rectangular plan, two storeys and four internal bays. The openings include wagon entrances, doors, vents in various patterns, and an owl hole in the south gable end.	II
Grange House; 53.67681°N 0.72368°W	—	Mid to late 18th century	The house is in yellow brick with red brick dressings, the addition is in red brick, and the house has a stepped and cogged brick eaves cornice, and a tile roof with stone coped gables and shaped kneelers. There are two storeys and an attic, a front range of three bays, a rear wing, and an addition in the angle. The central doorway has a fanlight, the windows are sashes, and all the openings on the front are in architraves, and have flat brick arches.	II
South View Farmhouse; 53.68035°N 0.71732°W	—	1776 (probable)	The farmhouse is in red-brown brick, with stepped eaves and a tile roof. There are two storeys and an L-shaped plan, with a front range of three bays, the middle bay projecting, and a rear wing on the left. The central doorway has a fanlight, consoles and a hood. The windows are casements under cambered rubbed brick arches.	II
Farm buildings east of South View Farmhouse; 53.68036°N 0.71711°W		1776	The range includes a dovecote, a stable and a granary, in red-brown brick with double stepped eaves, and pantile roofs with tumbled-in brick to the raised gables. There is a rectangular plan, with two storeys and three bays, the middle bay taller and containing the dovecote. The openings include doorways, windows and slit vents.	II
Ross Farmhouse; 53.69818°N 0.74145°W	—	1787 (probable)	The farmhouse is in brick, with stepped eaves, and a pantile roof with coped gables and shaped kneelers. There are two storeys and an L-shaped plan, with a front range of three bays, and a rear wing on the right. The central doorway has panelled pilasters, a decorated frieze, a moulded cornice and a hood. The windows are sashes in architraves under cambered stucco arches with keystones.	II
The Old Vicarage; 53.67852°N 0.72500°W		1796	The vicarage, which has been extended and later converted into a private house, is in brick with a bracketed gutter, and a double-span Welsh slate roof with stone coped gables. There are two storeys, a double-depth plan, the original part has a front with three bays, flanked by later wings. The central doorway has pilasters, a fanlight, an entablature and a hood, and the windows are sashes under cambered brick arches.	II
Farm buildings and walls west of Whitgift Hall; 53.69554°N 0.76523°W		c. 1819	A coach house and stable-granary range incorporating two houses, in brick, formerly with Westmorland slate roofs, and now in ruins. There is an L-shaped plan, with two storeys, and a north range of three rooms and a west range of seven rooms. The screen wall extends along the east side of the yard, and there are earlier garden walls on the north and west sides.	II
Stable range and gateway southwest of Whitgift Hall; 53.69511°N 0.76504°W	—	1819	The stable range is in brick, with roofs of slate and corrugated asbestos and a rectangular plan. The main range has a projecting two-storey bay, flanked by single-storey four-bay wings. On the roof is a wrought iron weathervane and a ball finial. The gateway has a central carriage entrance with square piers, flanked by coped walls containing lower piers and pedestrian gateways. The piers have moulded caps and low pyramidal tops.	II
East stable range and wall, New Breaks Farm; 53.67792°N 0.78554°W	—	Early 19th century	The stable range is in brick, with the hipped roof mainly in pantile. There is a single storey, and the openings include doorways and hatches under segmental arches, a round-headed entrance, and vents. The adjoining wall has stone coping, and contains wooden gates.	II
West stable range, New Breaks Farm; 53.67808°N 0.78587°W	—	Early 19th century	The stable and granary range is in brick, with stepped eaves, a hipped pantile roof and a rectangular plan. There are two storeys and four bays, and a single-storey two-bay range on the left. The openings include round-arched entrances, segmental-arched hatches, and vents.	II
Barn and horse mill, New Breaks Farm; 53.67812°N 0.78558°W	—	Early to mid-19th century	The threshing barn and horse mill are in brown brick, with hipped roofs, that of the barn in slate, and the horse mill in pantile. The barn has three storeys, nine bays and a rectangular plan. It contains full-height entrances, windows and slit vents, and has stepped eaves. The horse mill has a single storey with a canted west end. It is on a plinth, and has piers at the corners, and doorways.	II
Whitgift War Memorial; 53.69461°N 0.77711°W		{1921	The war memorial is in the churchyard of St Mary Magdelene's Church, Whitgift, to the northwest of the church. It is in stone, and consists of a Latin cross, with decorated mouldings at the ends of the cross arms and a moulded foot, on a tapering octagonal shaft. This is on an octagonal plinth, on a base of two steps, on a narrow square step. On the plinth are an inscription and the names of those lost in the two World Wars, and on the base is another inscription.	II
Lighthouse; 53.69889°N 0.75757°W		c. 1920	The lighthouse on the bank of the River Ouse, built for the Aire and Calder Navigation, is a tapered circular tower on a concrete base. It has three stages, and is 46 feet (14 m) in height. On the base is a doorway, and on the tower are small stair lights, above which is a balcony. The top stage has a wide window on the north side, under a cornice and a ribbed sheet metal dome, on which is a small cylindrical ventilator with a conical cap.	II
