= Luddington railway station =

Railway station in Luddington, Lincolnshire, England

Luddington
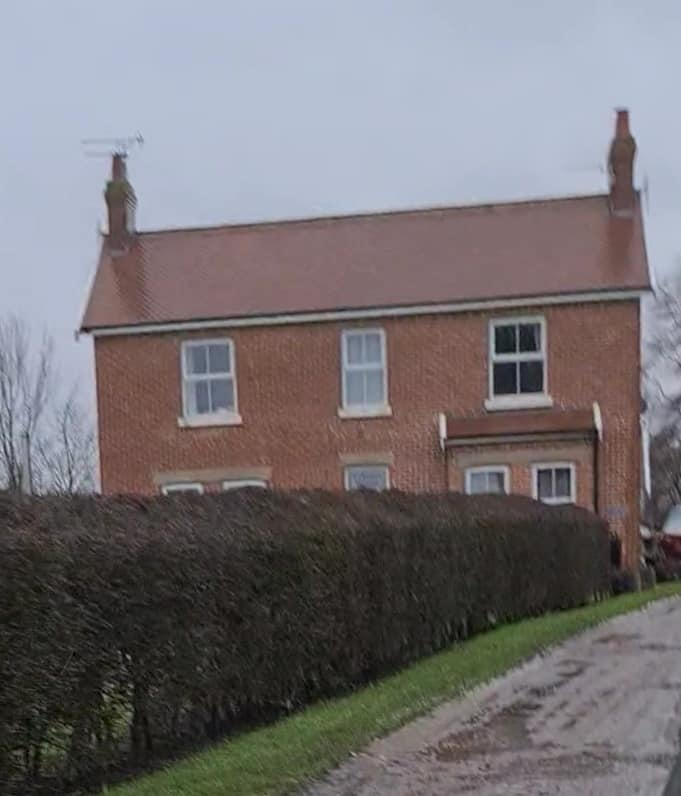

General information
- Location: Luddington, Lincolnshire; England
- Coordinates: 53.64963°N 0.75317°W

Other information
- Status: Disused

History
- Original company: Axholme Light Railway
- Pre-grouping: Axholme Joint Railway
- Post-grouping: Joint LMS and LNER

Key dates
- 10 August 1903: opened
- 17 July 1933: closed
Location

Luddington railway station was a station in Luddington, Lincolnshire on the Axholme Joint Railway branch to Fockerby.

Former Services

Preceding station	Disused railways	Following station
Eastoft	Axholme Joint Railway	Fockerby
