= Adlingfleet =

Village in the East Riding of Yorkshire, England

Coordinates: 53.679646°N 0.723667°W

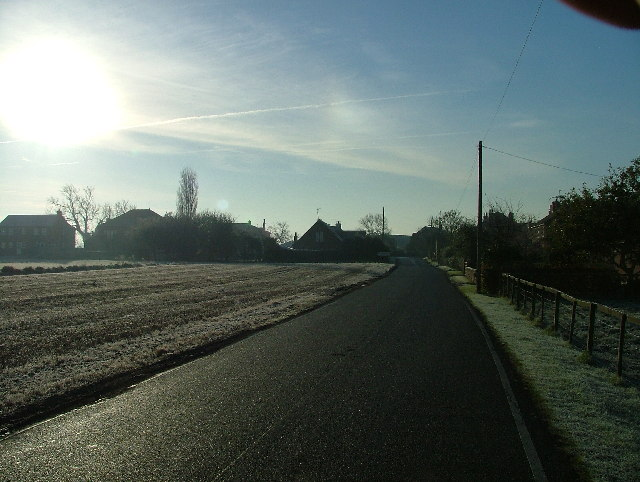
- North end of Adlingfleet on a winter day

- Location within the East Riding of Yorkshire
- OS grid reference: SE844211
  - London: 150 mi (240 km) S
- Civil parish: Twin Rivers
- Unitary authority: East Riding of Yorkshire
- Ceremonial county: East Riding of Yorkshire
- Region: Yorkshire and the Humber
- Country: England
- Sovereign state: United Kingdom
- Post town: GOOLE
- Postcode district: DN14
- Dialling code: 01724
- Police: Humberside
- Fire: Humberside
- Ambulance: Yorkshire
- UK Parliament: Goole and Pocklington

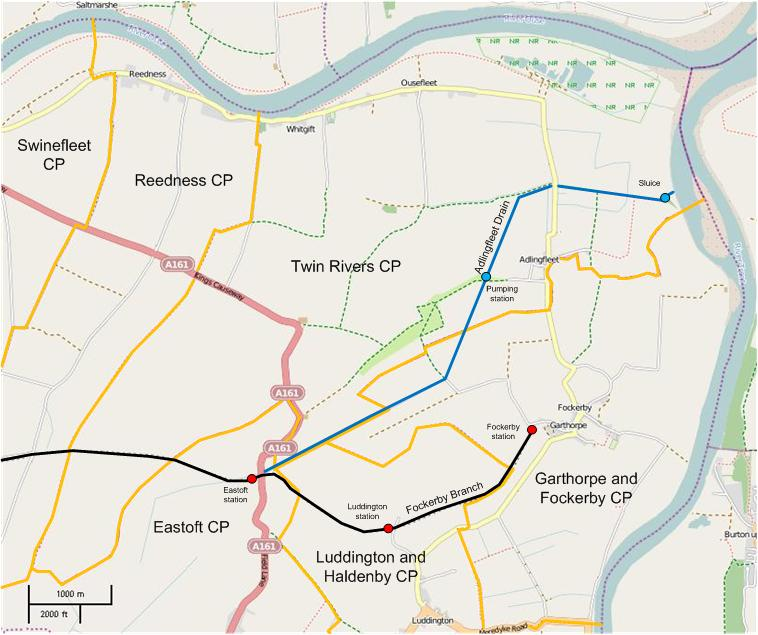
Most of the Adlingfleet Drain is in the Twin Rivers Civil Parish.

Adlingfleet is a drained, fertile, former marshland village and former civil parish, now in the parish of Twin Rivers, in the East Riding of Yorkshire, England. It is 6.5 miles (10.5 km) east-southeast of Goole town centre. Its sea wall along the far north-east is set back from the Ouse estuary leaving the largest single reedbed in England. In 1961 the parish had a population of 137.

Adlingfleet is an ancient parish within the Wapentake of Osgoldcross in the historic county of Yorkshire West Riding.

== Geography ==
Adlingfleet is on a minor road set back from the final, southern bank of the Ouse estuary. From Goole the road passes Swinefleet, Reedness, Whitgift and Ousefleet before turning to the south by Blacktoft Sands RSPB reserve to reach the village. The road continues southwards, to Fockerby and Garthorpe, all in similar multiple-drains fields.

The boundary between the East Riding of Yorkshire and North Lincolnshire comes to a point 820 feet (250 m) south of the village centre. It weaves such as along the eastern edge of the housing, then runs east to reach the Trent estuary. At its north-eastern tip are mud banks, short of Trent Falls, where Trent and the Ouse meet – forming the Humber.

All of the surrounding land is low-lying and flat. It is protected from flooding by sea walls along the banks of: the Trent to the east; and the Ouse to the north. To north and north east the sea wall is set back, leaving to nature the largest tidal reedbed in England. This is managed by the Royal Society for the Protection of Birds. It is a haven for wildlife. Before the drainage schemes of the 18th century, much more of the area was saltmarsh, leaving soils with varying pH and high concentrations of metals, including ochre.

== History ==
The name Adlingfleet derives from the Old English æðelingflēot meaning 'the prince's estuary'.

The village was written as "Adelingesfluet" in the Domesday Book. From this we know that the lord of the manor was Siward Barn before the Norman Conquest; later, in 1086, it was Geoffrey de la Guerche.

It was part of the Goole Rural District in the West Riding of Yorkshire from 1894 to 1974, and was then in the Boothferry district of Humberside until 1996. On 1 April 1983 the parish was abolished to form Twin Rivers, part also went to Eastoft.

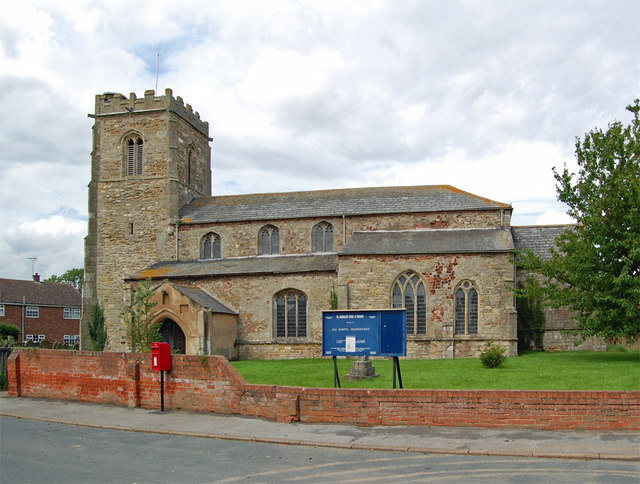
All Saints Church, Adlingfleet

The parish church of All Saints is a Grade I listed building. The building has a cruciform plan, with a nave, a chancel, a south aisle, north and south transepts, and a square tower at the west end. Much of it is 13th century, with some re-used 12th-century doors. The aisle and tower were built in the 15th century, and various amendments were made in 1792–94, in 1828 and in 1955–57. Internally, the building contains monuments including a very fine knight effigy, to a Haldenby, who died in 1596.

At 66 yards (60 m) south is a raised platform for the remains of a rectory, dating from the mid-13th century. It is grade II* listed, and was constructed of ashlar and coursed rubble by John le Franceys, who was Adlingfleet's rector and also a king's counsellor. The remains, which have not had a roof since the 1970s, and the platform on which they stand, are a scheduled ancient monument, as there are thought to be the remains of other structures below the surface. West is the old vicarage, built by Rev. Tyson in 1796. Red-brick modifications were made in 1835–37 by Rev. Erskine Neal. The original structure is in yellow-brown brick.

== Adlingfleet Drainage ==
Adlingfleet Level is 5,000 acres (2,000 ha) of principally former marshland south west of the Trent-Ouse-Humber confluence. In 1764, landowners contacted the civil engineer John Smeaton, who drew up proposals for a drainage scheme. This formed the basis for an Act of Parliament, which the landowners obtained in March 1767. The Act authorised Drainage Commissioners to be appointed, and they asked Smeaton's colleague, John Grundy, Jr., to act as engineer for the project. David Buffery was the resident engineer and Charles Tate the land surveyor. Grundy made few changes to Smeaton's plans. By July, he had drawn the plans and specifications for the sluice which would connect the main drain to the Trent, and work began on it in August. A contract for the excavation of the main drain was awarded to James Pinkerton and John Dyson in October. This was the first known civil engineering contract for both men, but they went on to work together on a number of schemes, including the Driffield Navigation and the Laneham Drainage project, and seem to have acted as management contractors, organising and supplying labour to these schemes. By April 1769, all the major elements of the project had been completed, and the project had cost around £7,000 (equivalent to £1,000,000 in 2025). The Commissioners retained Buffery, to ensure that some remaining minor works were completed to a satisfactory standard.

On 13 June 1903 the Commissioners asked J Simmons, an engineer from Doncaster, to estimate the cost of a pumping plant, which would be built at the head of the drain. He produced plans and drawings, liaising with suppliers to obtain costings for the pumps. The engine house would have been 18.5 by 30 feet (5.6 by 9.1 m) with a boiler house which was 11 feet (3.4 m) wide. He submitted the scheme to the Commissioners at a meeting in Goole on 30 June, but they decided that it was too costly, and so he produced a revised scheme, which included a 75-foot (23 m) chimney at the engine house. The cost was estimated at £1,452, and another meeting at Goole on 15 July asked him to obtain formal tenders for the engine and pump house. However, the scheme was again considered to be too costly, and the Commissioners wrote to Simmons on 29 July to tell him that it had been cancelled. He invoiced them for 2.5% of the estimate cost, plus travelling expenses, which amounted to £37 1s (£37.05). Following a half-yearly meeting on 10 May 1904, they wrote to say they were willing to pay 10 guineas (£10.50).

=== 1927 Upgrade ===
After periodic flooding in the 1920s, a survey was made, indicating that the fall on the main drain was around 2 inches per mile (30 mm per km), which was not sufficient for good drainage by gravity. Based on the premise that a pumping scheme had an annual cost for running and maintenance, whereas lowering the cill was essentially a one-time cost, the Commissioners of the Adlingfleet and Whitgift Drainage Board asked for tenders for a new sluice in December 1926. The cill would be 2.5 feet (0.76 m) lower than the existing one, and the contract was for construction of the sluice and work on the drain itself, to make it wider and deeper. Near the sluice, the channel would be 75 feet (23 m) wide at the top, 12 feet (3.7 m) wide at the bottom and 20.5 feet (6.2 m) deep. Decreasing sizes were specified for six sections over its 4-mile (6.4 km) length, with the final section being 10 feet (3.0 m) wide at the bottom and only 1.83 feet (0.56 m) deep. Various bridges would need their foundations lowered and other improvements to be made, while Gill's Close bridge was to be dismantled and not replaced.

The previous sluice was 10 feet (3.0 m) wide, built of masonry, and was in an unstable condition by this time. The new one would be 16 feet (4.9 m) wide, with wing walls making the entire structure 61 feet (19 m) wide. It would be 105 feet (32 m) long, and the cill would be 22.5 feet (6.9 m) below the highest tide level. Construction would be of reinforced concrete, and the sluice would be built slightly to the north of the existing one, so that it could be completed without interrupting the discharge from the drain. Eleven quotations were received, and the contract was awarded to H. Arnold and Son of Doncaster on 15 February 1927, whose estimate was for £13,847. Having built the sluice structure, a new channel was excavated by mechanical excavator, to connect it to the existing drain. On the river side, the new channel was dredged by the Aire and Calder Navigation Company and covered with stone. They had the necessary plant to complete this part of the work. The benefits were expounded by Simmons, the engineers for the work, in an article which appeared in The Concrete Way in 1929, where he stated that following the work, the water levels in winter were several inches below the normal summer levels. In August 1932 Simmons produced a specification for sluice doors to be installed at Willowbank bridge, but they were not installed.

=== Current state ===
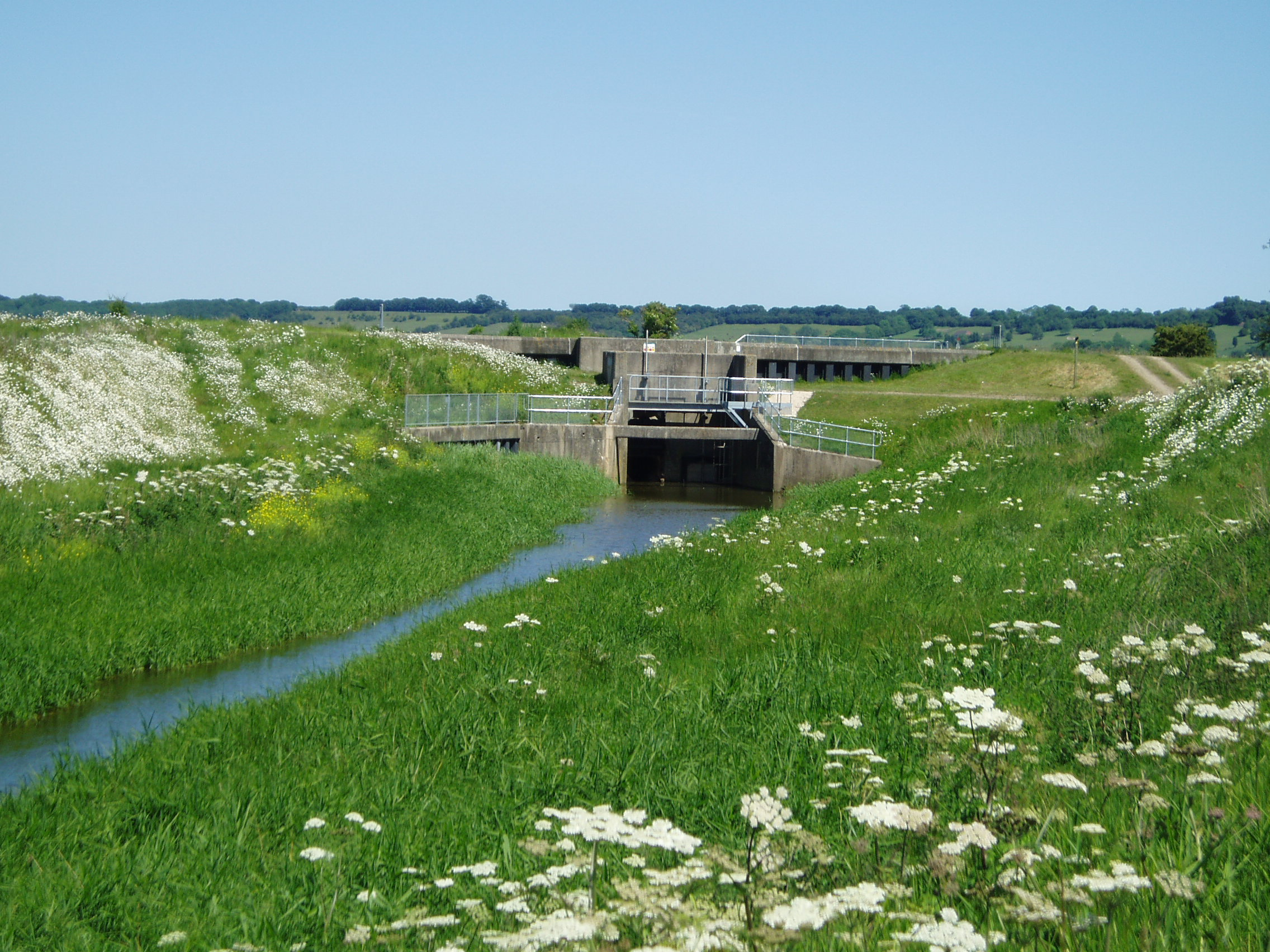
The outlet sluice into the River Trent

A sluice with pumps was eventually built to the north of Cowlane bridge in Adlingfleet. The control building carries the date 1984 on a large stone built into the walls. Construction of a sewage treatment works next to the sluice was well advanced in 2011. The bridges at Hoggards Lane, Cowlane and Willowbank have been replaced by corrugated steel tubes, backfilled up to the level of the road surface. Mains bridge is still a single arched brick structure, while at the end of the drain, Whinsgate bridge consists of the main brick arch under the A161 road, with arches in both wing walls, which enable tracks to cross Dodds Dyke and Eastoft Drain. The southern track over Eastoft Drain was formerly the course of the Fockerby Branch of the Axholme Joint Railway until its closure in 1965. At the outfall, the pointed gates have gone, replaced by a circular opening through a massed concrete infill, with a flap gate on the outlet side, and a vertical lifting steel gate on the inland side.

Responsibility for the drain changed in 2005, when the Adlingfleet and Whitgift Drainage Commissioners amalgamated with five other Internal Drainage Boards, to become part of the Isle of Axholme Internal Drainage Board. It changed again on 1 April 2011, when the new body amalgamated with three more Internal Drainage Boards to become the Isle of Axholme and North Nottinghamshire Water Level Management Board.

=== Eels ===
The presence of barriers across waterways has been identified as one of the factors behind the decline in eel populations, and following new regulations introduced in 2009, a study was carried out to assess which catchments bordering the Humber could provide suitable habitat for eels. Those with pumps were eliminated, but eight waterways were identified as possible candidates for the fitting of eel passes to aid eel migration. On Adlingfleet drain, the entrance sluice acted as a barrier, and there was a second barrier at the sluice and pumping station by Cowlane Bridge. Although rectification was deemed to be difficult, the drain was ranked fourth in a list of tributaries that could support the migration of eels and other migratory fish. By May 2011, an innovative fish-flap had been fitted, which does not compromise the flood protection, but allows fish to pass at certain states of the tide.

=== Water quality ===
The Environment Agency measure the water quality of the river systems in England. Each is given an overall ecological status, which may be one of five levels: high, good, moderate, poor and bad. There are several components that are used to determine this, including biological status, which looks at the quantity and varieties of invertebrates, angiosperms and fish. Chemical status, which compares the concentrations of various chemicals against known safe concentrations, is rated good or fail. Adlingfleet Drain is designated as "artificial", which means that the channels have been created by human activity, and the criteria for this designation are defined by the Water Framework Directive.

The water quality of Adlingfleet Drain was as follows in 2019.

| Section | Ecological Status | Chemical Status | Length | Catchment | Channel |
|---|---|---|---|---|---|
| Adlingfleet Drain Upper Catchment | Moderate | Fail | 4.3 miles (6.9 km) | 12.00 square miles (31.1 km^{2}) | artificial |

The reasons for the quality being less than good are largely to do with agriculture and land management adjacent to the watercourse. Like many rivers in the UK, the chemical status changed from good to fail in 2019, due to the presence of polybrominated diphenyl ethers (PBDE) and mercury compounds, neither of which had previously been included in the assessment.

== See also ==
- Listed buildings in Twin Rivers, East Riding of Yorkshire

== Bibliography ==
- Gazetteer — A–Z of Towns Villages and Hamlets. East Riding of Yorkshire Council. 2006. p. 3.
- Nunn, Andy; et al. (2007). "Humber eel management issues: barriers and stocking". University of Hull International Fisheries Institute. Archived from the original on 4 March 2016.
- Nunn, Andy; et al. (November 2011). "Prioritising eel-migration barriers for passage improvements". University of Hull International Fisheries Institute. Archived from the original on 18 March 2018.
- Simmons, George H. (1929). "Land Drainage Outfall Sluice, Trent Falls". The Concrete Way. Copy in Doncaster Archives, ref DY/SIM/3/16.
- Skempton, Sir Alec; et al. (2002). A Biographical Dictionary of Civil Engineers in Great Britain and Ireland: Vol 1: 1500 to 1830. Thomas Telford. ISBN 978-0-7277-2939-2.
