= Eastoft railway station =

Railway station in Eastoft, Lincolnshire, England

Eastoft
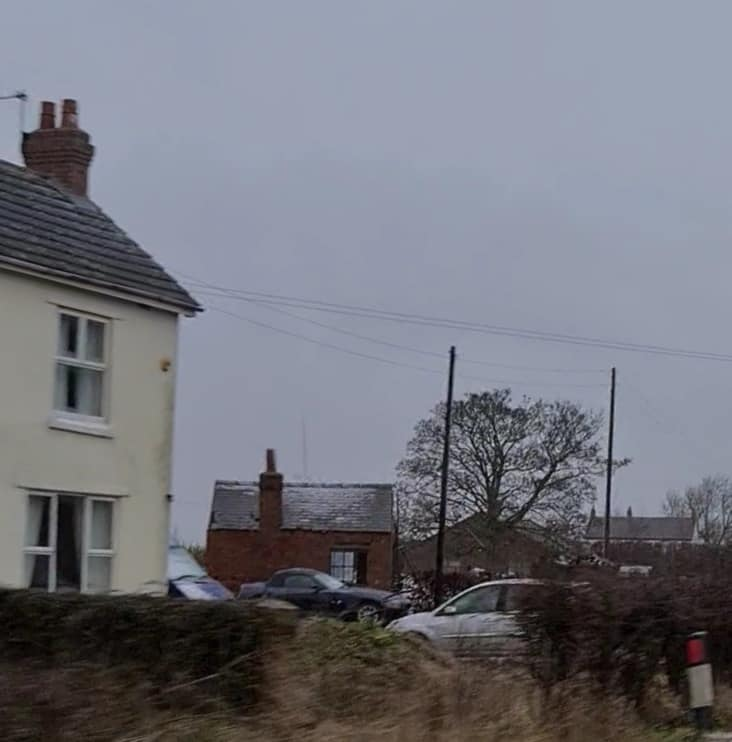
- Eastoft station in 2021

General information
- Location: Eastoft, Lincolnshire; England
- Coordinates: 53.6553°N 0.7777°W

Other information
- Status: Disused

History
- Original company: Axholme Light Railway
- Pre-grouping: Axholme Joint Railway
- Post-grouping: Joint LMS and LNER

Key dates
- 10 August 1903: opened
- 17 July 1933: closed
Location

Eastoft railway station was a station in Eastoft, Lincolnshire on the Axholme Joint Railway.

== History ==
The station was opened on 10 August 1903 when the passenger services started from Goole via Marshland Junction to Crowle North and Fockerby. It officially closed on 17 July 1933 but as there was no Sunday service the last train ran on 15 July 1933. The last passenger service to use the line through the station was run by the North Axholme Secondary School on 1 April 1965.

== Route ==
Preceding station	Disused railways	Following station
Reedness Junction	Axholme Joint Railway	Luddington
