= Fockerby =

Village in North Lincolnshire, England

Coordinates: 53.6604°N 0.721969°W

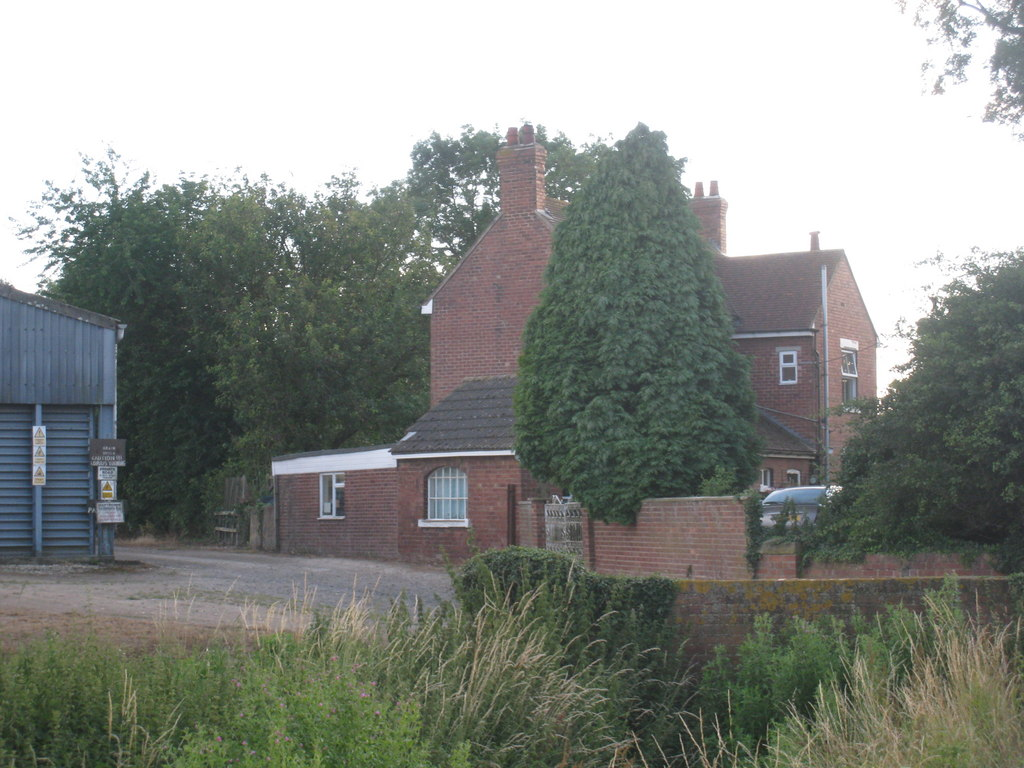
- Former Station Master's House

- Location within Lincolnshire
- OS grid reference: SE845189
  - London: 150 mi (240 km) S
- Civil parish: Garthorpe and Fockerby
- Unitary authority: North Lincolnshire
- Ceremonial county: Lincolnshire
- Region: Yorkshire and the Humber
- Country: England
- Sovereign state: United Kingdom
- Post town: SCUNTHORPE
- Postcode district: DN17
- Police: Humberside
- Fire: Humberside
- Ambulance: East Midlands
- UK Parliament: Doncaster East and the Isle of Axholme

Fockerby is a village in the civil parish of Garthorpe and Fockerby, in the North Lincolnshire district, in the ceremonial county of Lincolnshire, England. It is situated approximately 8 miles (13 km) south-east from Goole and 1 mile (1.6 km) west from the River Trent.

Fockerby for centuries was part of the ancient parish of Adlingfleet. The village of Fockerby was situated within the Wapentake of Osgoldcross in the historic county of Yorkshire West Riding.

Fockerby is part of the Isle of Axholme and close to the border with the East Riding of Yorkshire. It is contiguous with the village of Garthorpe to the north-east, with which it forms one community joined by a section of road which crosses the previous course of the River Don.

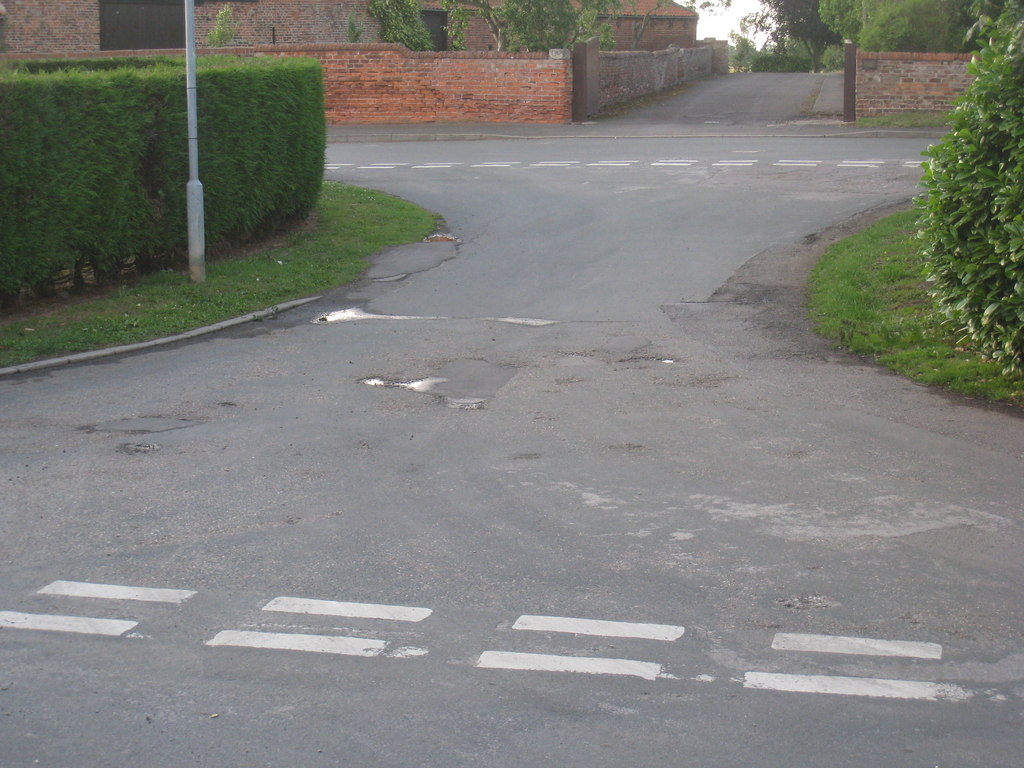
Road joining Fockerby and Garthorpe over the previous course of the River Don

== History ==
In 1872 Fockerby was in Yorkshire, divided from Garthorpe by the "Old Don".

By 1881 the village was a township in the parish of Adlingfleet in the West Riding of Yorkshire, and "on the west bank of the old Don River, which is now filled in and under cultivation". Lords of the manor and principal landowners were the Master and fellows of St Catharine's College, Cambridge. Chief crops grown were flax, potatoes, wheat and beans on an area of 910 acres (3.7 km^{2}). Occupations at the time included a land surveyor, a tailor, a miller, and three farmers, one of whom was a landowner who lived at the Hall and employed a farm bailiff. Fockerby population in 1871 was 88.

in 1866 Fockerby became a separate civil parish, on 1 April 1983 the parish was abolished to form "Garthope and Fockerby". In 1971 the parish had a population of 52. From 1974 to 1996 it was in the Boothferry district and the county of Humberside.

Fockerby was once served by Fockerby railway station the terminus of a branch line from Goole.
