= Amcotts =

Village and civil parish in the North Lincolnshire district of Lincolnshire, England

Coordinates: 53.61°N 00.71°W

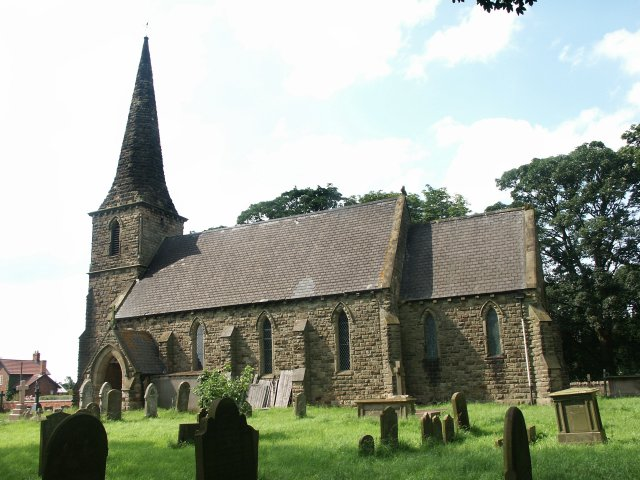
- St Mark's Church, Amcotts

- Location within Lincolnshire
- Population: 262 (2011)
- OS grid reference: SE8514
  - London: 145 mi (233 km) S
- Unitary authority: North Lincolnshire
- Ceremonial county: Lincolnshire
- Region: Yorkshire and the Humber
- Country: England
- Sovereign state: United Kingdom
- Post town: Scunthorpe
- Postcode district: DN17
- Police: Humberside
- Fire: Humberside
- Ambulance: East Midlands
- UK Parliament: Doncaster East and the Isle of Axholme

Amcotts is a village and civil parish in the North Lincolnshire district of Lincolnshire, England, and on the Isle of Axholme. The village is situated north-west from Scunthorpe, and on the west bank of the River Trent facing Flixborough on the east bank. The 2001 Census recorded a population of 219 for the parish, increasing to 260 at the 2021 census.

== History ==
Amcotts is listed in the 1086 Domesday Book with eight households.

A chantry chapel was founded in the mid-15th century by Geoffrey Crowle and William Amcotts.

Formerly a township of Althorpe parish, Amcotts was created a civil parish in 1866 and enlarged in 1885 by gaining part of neighbouring Luddington.

Amcotts Grade II listed Anglican parish church is dedicated to St Mark, and was built in 1853 to replace an earlier church dedicated to St Thomas A Becket which fell down in 1849.

Amcotts CE School, built in 1860 as a National School, closed in 1961.

In 1974 properties in the village were subject to significant damage because of the Flixborough disaster.

== Marae ==
The hamlet of "Marae", or "The Marshes" now a deserted medieval village of which no surface evidence remains, was supposedly at the outfall of Mere Dyke on the River Trent, which is now in Amcotts, but then was in Luddington parish which extended to the bank of the Trent until 1885. At the time of Domesday Book of 1086, Marae was listed as having three households.

== Population ==
Population of Amcotts Civil Parish
Year	1881	1891	1901	1911	1921	1931	1941	1961	2001	2011	2021
Population	397	332	300	278	292	270	242	225	219	262	260
