= Ousefleet =

Hamlet in the East Riding of Yorkshire, England

Coordinates: 53.698232°N 0.747219°W

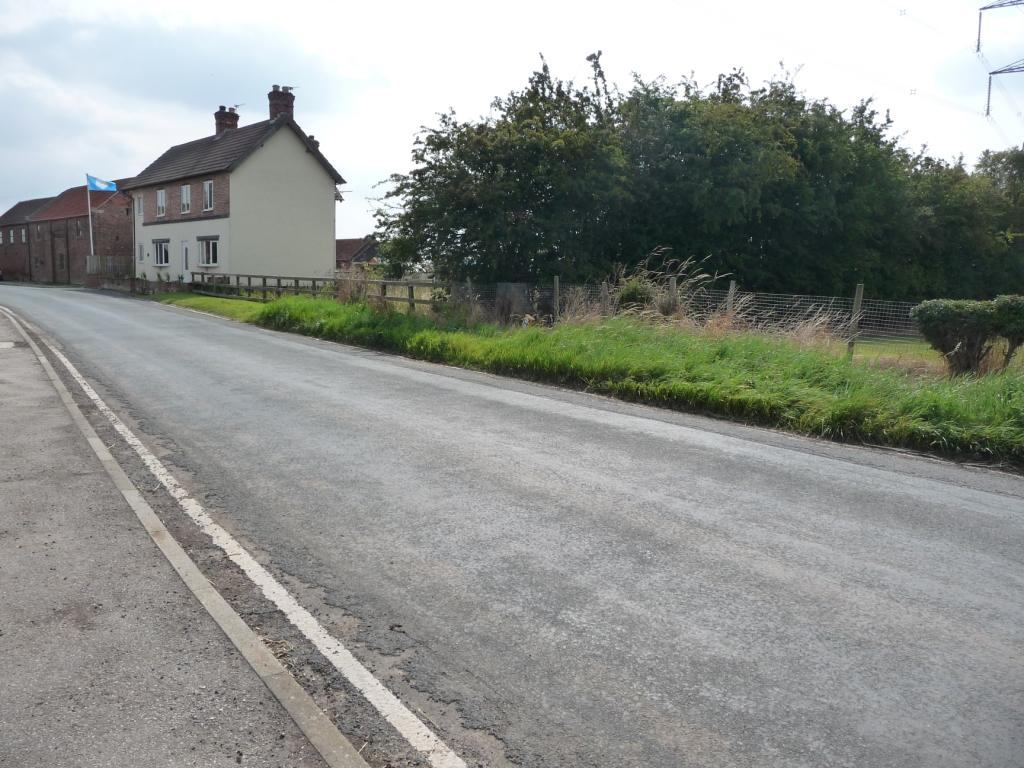

- Location within the East Riding of Yorkshire
- OS grid reference: SE828231
- Civil parish: Twin Rivers
- Unitary authority: East Riding of Yorkshire
- Ceremonial county: East Riding of Yorkshire
- Region: Yorkshire and the Humber
- Country: England
- Sovereign state: United Kingdom
- Post town: Goole
- Postcode district: DN14
- Dialling code: 01405
- Police: Humberside
- Fire: Humberside
- Ambulance: Yorkshire
- UK Parliament: Goole and Pocklington

Ousefleet is a small hamlet and former civil parish, now in the parish of Twin Rivers, in the East Riding of Yorkshire, England approximately 5 miles (8 km) east of Goole. It is located just south of the River Ouse and north of the A161 road between Goole and Scunthorpe. In 1961 the parish had a population of 167.

== Overview ==
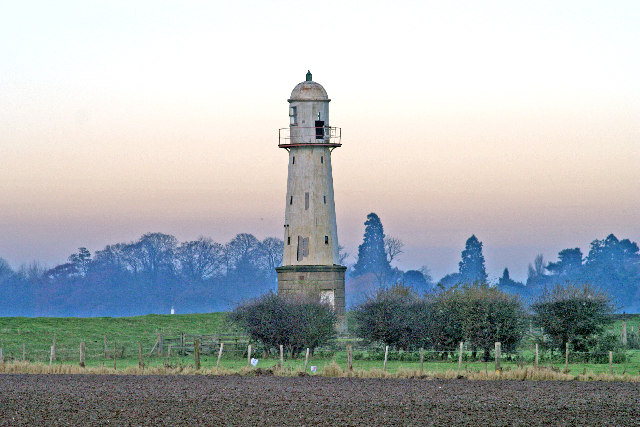
The Whitgift Lighthouse, on the west side of Ousefleet

The name Ousefleet derives from the Old English Ouseflēot meaning 'stream by the River Ouse'.

Ousefleet was formerly a township in the parish of Whitgift, from 1866 Ousefleet was a civil parish in its own right, on 1 April 1983 the parish was abolished to form Twin Rivers.

Ousefleet was part of the Goole Rural District in the West Riding of Yorkshire from 1894 to 1974, then in Boothferry district of Humberside until 1996.

Ousefleet is listed by Ordnance Survey as being near to the grid square (on 1:50000 and 1:25000 maps) that has the least detail (a pylon line).

Ousefleet has a village hall that was a former school of Victorian origin with some extensions added during the 20th century. The Hall Management Committee are raising funds to carry out improvements.

Ousefleet holds a village show, generally in August. The show was revived in 1965.

== See also ==
- Listed buildings in Twin Rivers, East Riding of Yorkshire
