= Whitgift, East Riding of Yorkshire =

Village in the East Riding of Yorkshire, England

Whitgift
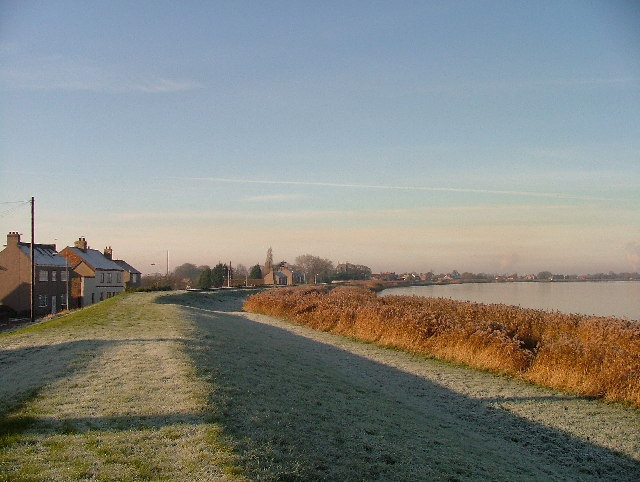
- Whitgift and the Ouse

- Location within the East Riding of Yorkshire
- OS grid reference: SE815228
- Civil parish: Twin Rivers
- Unitary authority: East Riding of Yorkshire
- Ceremonial county: East Riding of Yorkshire
- Region: Yorkshire and the Humber
- Country: England
- Sovereign state: United Kingdom
- Post town: GOOLE
- Postcode district: DN14
- Dialling code: 01405
- Police: Humberside
- Fire: Humberside
- Ambulance: Yorkshire
- UK Parliament: Goole and Pocklington

Whitgift is a small linear village and former civil parish, now in the parish of Twin Rivers, in the East Riding of Yorkshire, England approximately 4 miles (6.4 km) east of Goole. It is located alongside the River Ouse and north of the A161 road between Goole and Scunthorpe. Ousefleet and Reedness are to the east and west respectively. Historically Whitgift was part of the West Riding of Yorkshire. In 1961 the parish had a population of 191.

== Features ==
There was for many years a Whitgift ferry, which may originally have predated the village. Between November 1606 and February 1607, a persistent cold weather spell froze the River Ouse, and the ferry could not operate. However, records indicate that ".. men, women and children, horses and wagons loaded went on ye water at Ouse here at Whitgift ferrie and son continued until ye xiiii day of Februarie...".

=== Church ===
Whitgift Church clock unusually has a XIII (but why?)

The Church of Mary Magdalene (on the Whitgift side of the border between Whitgift and Reedness) dates from 1304 (replacing an earlier building, 11th–12th century or earlier). It has a famous clock with an unusual feature: instead of 12 (XII in Roman numerals) it has a 13 (XIII). Reasons vary, but local rumour relates that it may be due to the church being adjacent to a pub (now closed) at which the painter imbibed before completing the job. The church was designated a Grade I listed building in 1967 and is now recorded in the National Heritage List for England, maintained by Historic England.

=== Hall ===
Whitgift is also notable for Whitgift Hall, a grade II* listed Georgian manor house built in 1704 by a family called Stephenson. Since it was built, it has undergone significant change. For example, bay windows were added and the current owners have a caravan site and fishing pond.

=== Lighthouse ===
Whitgift Lighthouse
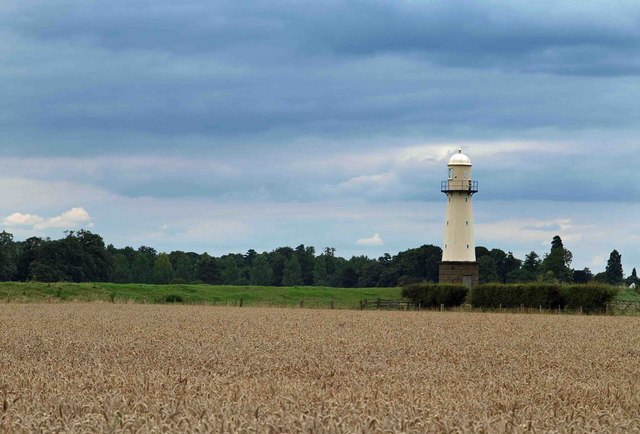
- Whitgift Lighthouse
- Location: Whitgift; East Riding of Yorkshire; England
- OS grid: SE8212723205
- Coordinates: 53.698847°N 0.757568°W

Tower
- Constructed: late 1900s
- Foundation: octagonal prism brick basement
- Construction: brick tower
- Height: 46 feet (14 m)
- Shape: tapered cylindrical tower with balcony and lantern
- Markings: unpainted basement, white tower and lantern
- Operator: Port of Hull and Goole
- Heritage: Grade II listed building

Light
- Focal height: 39 feet (12 m)
- Characteristic: F R

Whitgift lighthouse was erected just north of the village in the late 19th century, for the Aire and Calder Navigation: a five-storey cream-painted tower with a stone base, it stands 46 ft (14 m) high. It remains operational, a waymark for ships travelling to and from Goole docks, and is Grade II listed.

=== Other ===
Other features include a Methodist chapel, but Whitgift mainly consists of a sparse strip of houses spread out over its length bounded by the River Ouse to the north and fields to the south looking towards Eastoft.

== History ==
The place-name 'Whitgift' is first attested in a Yorkshire charter of circa 1080, where it appears as Witegift, and in a charter of 1232 where it appears as Whitegift. The name is thought to mean 'Hviti's or Hwita's gift'. Another theory is that the second element derives from the Old Norse gipt, meaning 'dowry'.

Whitgift was previously part of the Goole Rural District in the West Riding of Yorkshire from 1894 to 1974, then in Boothferry district of Humberside until 1996.

On 1 April 1983 the civil parish was abolished to form Twin Rivers.

== See also ==
- Listed buildings in Twin Rivers, East Riding of Yorkshire
