= Twin Rivers, East Riding of Yorkshire =

Civil parish in the East Riding of Yorkshire, England

Coordinates: 53.6836°N 0.7350°W

Twin Rivers
- Civil parish
- Population: 367 (2011 census)
- OS grid reference: SE836215
- Civil parish: Twin Rivers
- Unitary authority: East Riding of Yorkshire
- Ceremonial county: East Riding of Yorkshire
- Region: Yorkshire and the Humber
- Country: England
- Sovereign state: United Kingdom
- Post town: GOOLE
- Postcode district: DN14
- Police: Humberside
- Fire: Humberside
- Ambulance: Yorkshire
- UK Parliament: Goole and Pocklington

Twin Rivers is a civil parish in the East Riding of Yorkshire, England. It is situated along the south bank of the River Ouse to the east of the town of Goole, covering an area of 2,403.178 hectares (5,938.38 acres).

The civil parish is formed by the villages of Adlingfleet and Whitgift and the hamlet of Ousefleet.

The parish was part of the Goole Rural District in the West Riding of Yorkshire from 1894 to 1974, then in Boothferry district of Humberside until 1996.

According to the 2011 UK census, Twin Rivers parish had a population of 367, an increase on the 2001 UK census figure of 357.

== See also ==
- Listed buildings in Twin Rivers, East Riding of Yorkshire
