= The Spirit of the Age =

Collection of character sketches

The Spirit of the Age: Or, Contemporary Portraits
- Title page of The Spirit of the Age 2nd London edition
- Author: William Hazlitt
- Genre: Social criticism biography
- Published: 11 January 1825 (Henry Colburn)
- Publication place: England
- Media type: Print
- Preceded by: Liber Amoris: Or, The New Pygmalion
- Followed by: The Plain Speaker: Opinions on Books, Men, and Things
- Text: The Spirit of the Age: Or, Contemporary Portraits at Wikisource

The Spirit of the Age (full title The Spirit of the Age: Or, Contemporary Portraits) is a collection of character sketches by the early 19th century English essayist, literary critic, and social commentator William Hazlitt, portraying 25 men, mostly British, whom he believed to represent significant trends in the thought, literature, and politics of his time. The subjects include thinkers, social reformers, politicians, poets, essayists, and novelists, many of whom Hazlitt was personally acquainted with or had encountered. Originally appearing in English periodicals, mostly The New Monthly Magazine in 1824, the essays were collected with several others written for the purpose and published in book form in 1825.

The Spirit of the Age was one of Hazlitt's most successful books. It is frequently judged to be his masterpiece, even "the crowning ornament of Hazlitt's career, and ... one of the lasting glories of nineteenth-century criticism." Hazlitt was also a painter and an art critic, yet no artists number among the subjects of these essays. His artistic and critical sensibility, however, infused his prose style—Hazlitt was later judged to be one of the greatest of English prose stylists as well—enabling his appreciation of portrait painting to help him bring his subjects to life. His experience as a literary, political, and social critic contributed to Hazlitt's solid understanding of his subjects' achievements, and his judgements of his contemporaries were later often deemed to have held good after nearly two centuries.

The Spirit of the Age, despite its essays' uneven quality, has been generally agreed to provide "a vivid panorama of the age". Yet, missing an introductory or concluding chapter, and with few explicit references to any themes, it was for long also judged as lacking in coherence and hastily thrown together. More recently, critics have found in it a unity of design, with the themes emerging gradually, by implication, in the course of the essays and even supported by their grouping and presentation. Hazlitt also incorporated into the essays a vivid, detailed and personal, "in the moment" kind of portraiture that amounted to a new literary form and significantly anticipated modern journalism.

== Background ==
=== Preparation ===
Hazlitt was well prepared to write The Spirit of the Age. Hackney College, where he studied for two years, was known for fostering radical ideas, immersing him in the spirit of the previous age, and a generation later helping him understand changes he had observed in British society. He was befriended in his early years by the poets Wordsworth and Coleridge, who at that time shared his radical thinking, and soon he entered the circle of reformist philosopher William Godwin. His brother John was also responsible for helping him connect with other like-minded souls, leading him to the centre of London intellectual culture, where he met others who, years later, along with Wordsworth, Coleridge, and Godwin, would be brought to life in this book, particularly Charles Lamb and, some time afterward, Leigh Hunt.

Although Hazlitt had aimed at a career in philosophy, he was unable to make a living by it. His studies and extensive thinking about the problems of the day, however, provided a basis for judging contemporary thinkers. (He had already begun, before he was thirty, with an extensive critique of Malthus's theory of population.) After having practised for a while as an artist (a major part of his background that entered into the making of this book not in the selection of its content but as it helped inform his critical sensibility and his writing style), he found work as a political reporter, which exposed him to the major politicians and issues of the day.

Hazlitt followed this by many years as a literary, art, and theatre critic, at which he enjoyed some success. He was subsequently beset by numerous personal problems, including a failed marriage, illness, insolvency, a disastrous love entanglement that led to a mental breakdown, and scurrilous attacks by political conservatives, many of them fuelled by his indiscreet publication of Liber Amoris, a thinly disguised autobiographical account of his love affair. English society was becoming increasingly prudish, the ensuing scandal effectively destroyed his reputation, and he found it harder than ever to earn a living. He married a second time. Consequently, more than ever in need of money, he was forced to churn out article after article for the periodical press.

=== "The Spirits of the Age" ===
Hazlitt had always been adept at writing character sketches. His first was incorporated into Free Thoughts on Public Affairs, written in 1806, when he was scarcely 28 years old. Pleased with this effort, he reprinted it three times as "Character of the Late Mr. Pitt", in The Eloquence of the British Senate (1807), in The Round Table (1817), and finally in Political Essays (1819).

Another favourite of his own was "Character of Mr. Cobbett", which first appeared in Table-Talk in 1821 and was later incorporated into The Spirit of the Age. Following this proclivity, toward the end of 1823 Hazlitt developed the idea of writing "a series of 'characters' of men who were typical of the age". The first of these articles appeared in the January 1824 issue of The New Monthly Magazine, under the series title "The Spirits of the Age".

=== Publication ===
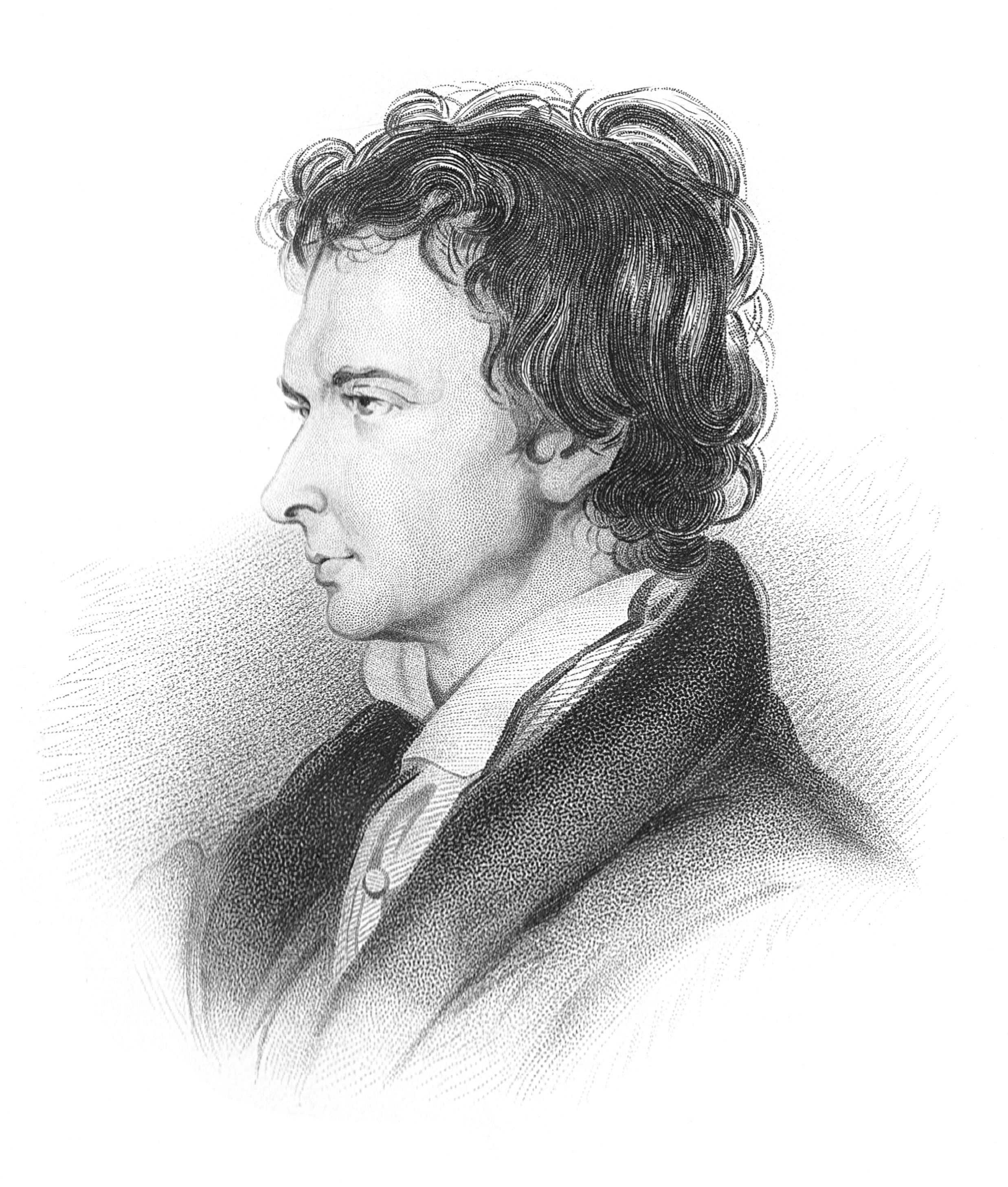
William Hazlitt in 1825 (engraving derived from a chalk sketch by William Bewick)

Four more articles appeared in the series, and then Hazlitt prepared numerous others with the goal of collecting them into a book. After he had left England for a tour of the continent with his wife, that book, bearing the title The Spirit of the Age: Or Contemporary Portraits, was published in London on 11 January 1825, by Henry Colburn, and printed by S. and R. Bentley. In Paris, Hazlitt arranged to have an edition, with a somewhat different selection and ordering of articles, published there by A. & W. Galignani. Unlike either English edition, this one bore his name on the title page. Finally, later in the same year, Colburn brought out the second English edition, with contents slightly augmented, revised, and rearranged but in many respects similar to the first edition. No further editions would appear in Hazlitt's lifetime.

=== Editions ===
Four of the essays that made it into the first edition of The Spirit of the Age, plus part of another, had appeared, without authorial attribution, in the series "The Spirits of the Age", in the following order: "Jeremy Bentham", "Rev. Mr. Irving", "The Late Mr. Horne Tooke", "Sir Walter Scott", and "Lord Eldon", in The New Monthly Magazine for 1824 in the January, February, March, April, and July issues, respectively.

In the book first published in January 1825, these essays, with much additional material, appeared as follows: "Jeremy Bentham", "William Godwin", "Mr. Coleridge", "Rev. Mr. Irving", "The Late Mr. Horne Tooke", "Sir Walter Scott", "Lord Byron", "Mr. Campbell—Mr. Crabbe", "Sir James Mackintosh", "Mr. Wordsworth", "Mr. Malthus", "Mr. Gifford", "Mr. Jeffrey", "Mr. Brougham—Sir F. Burdett", "Lord Eldon—Mr. Wilberforce", "Mr. Southey", "Mr. T. Moore—Mr. Leigh Hunt", and "Elia—Geoffrey Crayon". An untitled section characterising James Sheridan Knowles concludes the book. A portion of "Mr. Campbell—Mr. Crabbe" was adapted from an essay Hazlitt contributed (on Crabbe alone) to the series "Living Authors" in The London Magazine, "No. V" in the May 1821 issue.

Despite the closeness in the ordering of the contents of the first and second English editions, there are numerous differences between them, and even more between them and the Paris edition that appeared in between. The Paris edition, the only one to credit Hazlitt as the author, omitted some material and added some. The essays (in order) were as follows: "Lord Byron", "Sir Walter Scott", "Mr. Coleridge", "Mr. Southey", "Mr. Wordsworth", "Mr. Campbell and Mr. Crabbe" (the portion on Campbell was here claimed by Hazlitt to be "by a friend", though he wrote it himself), "Jeremy Bentham", "William Godwin", "Rev. Mr. Irving", "The Late Mr. Horne Tooke", "Sir James Mackintosh", "Mr. Malthus", "Mr. Gifford", "Mr. Jeffrey", "Mr. Brougham—Sir F. Burdett", "Lord Eldon and Mr. Wilberforce", "Mr. Canning" (brought in from the 11 July 1824 issue of The Examiner, where it bore the title "Character of Mr. Canning", this essay appeared only in the Paris edition), "Mr. Cobbett" (which had first appeared in Hazlitt's book Table-Talk in 1821), and "Elia". This time the book concludes with two untitled sections, the first on "Mr. Leigh Hunt" (as shown in the page header), the second again on Knowles, with the page header reading "Mr. Knowles".

Finally, later in 1825, the second English edition was brought out (again, anonymously). There, the essays were "Jeremy Bentham", "William Godwin", "Mr. Coleridge", "Rev. Mr. Irving", "The Late Mr. Horne Tooke", "Sir Walter Scott", "Lord Byron", "Mr. Southey", "Mr. Wordsworth", "Sir James Mackintosh", "Mr. Malthus", "Mr. Gifford", "Mr. Jeffrey", "Mr. Brougham—Sir F. Burdett", "Lord Eldon—Mr. Wilberforce", "Mr. Cobbett", "Mr. Campbell and Mr. Crabbe", "Mr. T. Moore—Mr. Leigh Hunt", and "Elia, and Geoffrey Crayon". Again, an account of Knowles completes the book.

== Essays ==
The order of the following accounts of the essays in the book follows that of the second English edition. (The essay on George Canning, however, appeared only in the Paris edition.)

=== Jeremy Bentham ===
Jeremy Bentham (1748–1832) was an English philosopher, jurist, and social and legislative reformer. He was a major proponent of Utilitarianism, based on the idea of "the greatest happiness of the greatest number", which he was the first to systematise, introducing it as the "principle of utility". Hazlitt's link with Bentham was unusual, as Bentham was his landlord and lived close by. Bentham would sometimes take his exercise in his garden, which was visible from Hazlitt's window. The two were not personally acquainted, yet what Hazlitt observed enabled him to interweave personal observations into his account of the older man.

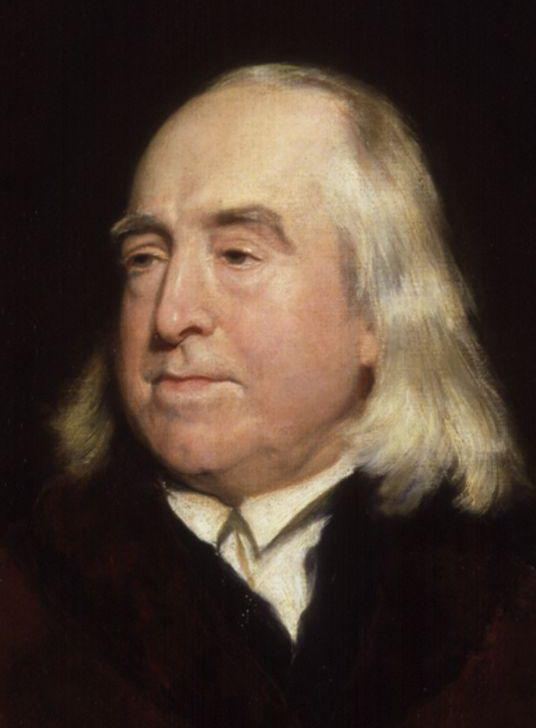
Jeremy Bentham by Henry William Pickersgill, detail

Bentham was a representative of the reformist element of the time. Yet, also symptomatic of "the spirit of the age"—and the note Hazlitt strikes on the opening of his sketch—was that Bentham had only a small following in England, yet enjoyed respectful celebrity in nations half a world away. "The people of Westminster, where he lives, hardly dream of such a person ...." "His name is little known in England, better in Europe, best of all in the plains of Chili and the mines of Mexico."

Hazlitt notes Bentham's persistent unity of purpose, "intent only on his grand scheme of Utility .... [r]egarding the people about him no more than the flies of a summer. He meditates the coming age .... he is a beneficent spirit, prying into the universe ...."

But Hazlitt soon qualifies his admiring tone. First, he cautions against mistaking Bentham for the originator of the theory of utility; rather, "his merit is, that he has brought all the objections and arguments, more distinctly labelled and ticketed, under this one head, and made a more constant and explicit reference to it at every step of his progress, than any other writer."

As Bentham's thinking gained complexity, his style, unfortunately, deteriorated. "It is a barbarous philosophical jargon" even though it "has a great deal of acuteness and meaning in it, which you would be glad to pick out if you could. ... His works have been translated into French", quips Hazlitt. "They ought to be translated into English."

"His works have been translated into French.
They ought to be translated into English."

— William Hazlitt, "Jeremy Bentham", The Spirit of the Age

Bentham's refined and elaborated logic fails, in Hazlitt's assessment, to take into account the complexities of human nature. In his attempt to reform mankind by reasoning, "he has not allowed for the wind ". Man is far from entirely "a logical animal", Hazlitt argues. Bentham bases his efforts to reform criminals on the fact that "'all men act from calculation'". Yet, Hazlitt observes, "it is of the very essence of crime to disregard consequences both to ourselves and others."

Hazlitt proceeds to contrast in greater detail the realities of human nature with Bentham's benevolent attempts to manipulate it. Bentham would observe and attempt to alter the behaviour of a criminal by placing him in a "Panopticon, that is, a sort of circular prison, with open cells, like a glass bee-hive." When the offender is freed from its restraints, however, Hazlitt questions whether it is at all likely he will maintain the altered behaviour that had seemed so amenable to change. "Will the convert to the great principle of Utility work when he was from under Mr. Bentham's eye, because he was forced to work when under it? ... Will he not steal, now that his hands are untied? ... The charm of criminal life ... consists in liberty, in hardship, in danger, and in the contempt of death, in one word, in extraordinary excitement".

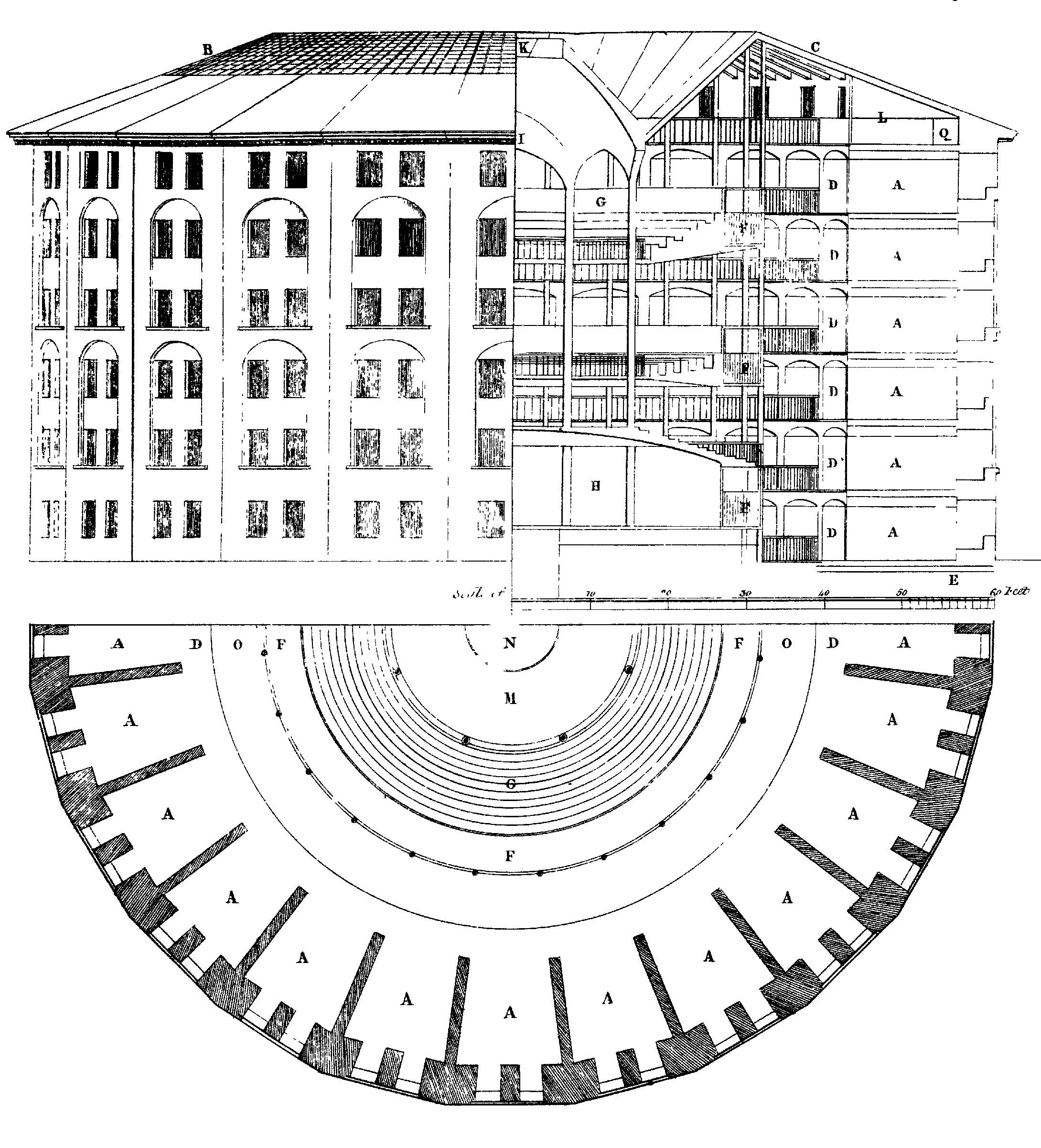
Panopticon

Further, there is a flaw in Bentham's endlessly elaborating on his single idea of utility. His "method of reasoning" is "comprehensive ..." but it "includes every thing alike. It is rather like an inventory, than a valuation of different arguments." Effective argument needs more colouring. "By aiming at too much ... it loses its elasticity and vigour". Hazlitt also objects to Bentham's considering "every pleasure" as "equally a good". This is not so, "for all pleasure does not equally bear reflecting on." Even if we take Bentham's reasoning as presenting "the whole truth", human nature is incapable of acting solely upon such grounds, "needing helps and stages in its progress" to "bring it into a tolerable harmony with the universe."

In the manner of later journalists Hazlitt weaves into his criticism of the philosopher's ideas an account of Bentham the man. True to his principles, "Mr. Bentham, in private life, is an amiable and exemplary character", of regular habits, and with childlike characteristics, despite his advanced age. In appearance, he is like a cross between Charles Fox and Benjamin Franklin, "a singular mixture of boyish simplicity and the venerableness of age." He has no taste for poetry, but relaxes by playing the organ. "He turns wooden utensils in a lathe for exercise, and fancies he can turn men in the same manner."

A century and a half later, critic Roy Park acclaimed "Hazlitt's criticism of Bentham and Utilitarianism" here and in other essays as constituting "the first sustained critique of dogmatic Utilitarianism."

=== William Godwin ===
William Godwin (1756–1836) was an English philosopher, social reformer, novelist, and miscellaneous writer. After the French Revolution had given fresh urgency to the question of the rights of man, in 1793, in response to other books written in reaction to the upheaval, and building on ideas developed by 18th-century European philosophers, Godwin published An Enquiry Concerning Political Justice. There he espoused (in the words of historian Crane Brinton) "the natural goodness of man, the corruptness of governments and laws, and the consequent right of the individual to obey his inner voice against all external dictates."

Godwin immediately became an inspiration to Hazlitt's generation. Hazlitt had known Godwin earlier, their families having been friends since before Hazlitt's birth; as he also often visited the elder man in London in later years, he was able to gather impressions over many decades. While so many of his contemporaries soon abandoned Godwin's philosophy, Hazlitt never did so completely; yet he had never quite been a disciple either. Eventually, although he retained respect for the man, he developed a critical distance from Godwinian philosophy.

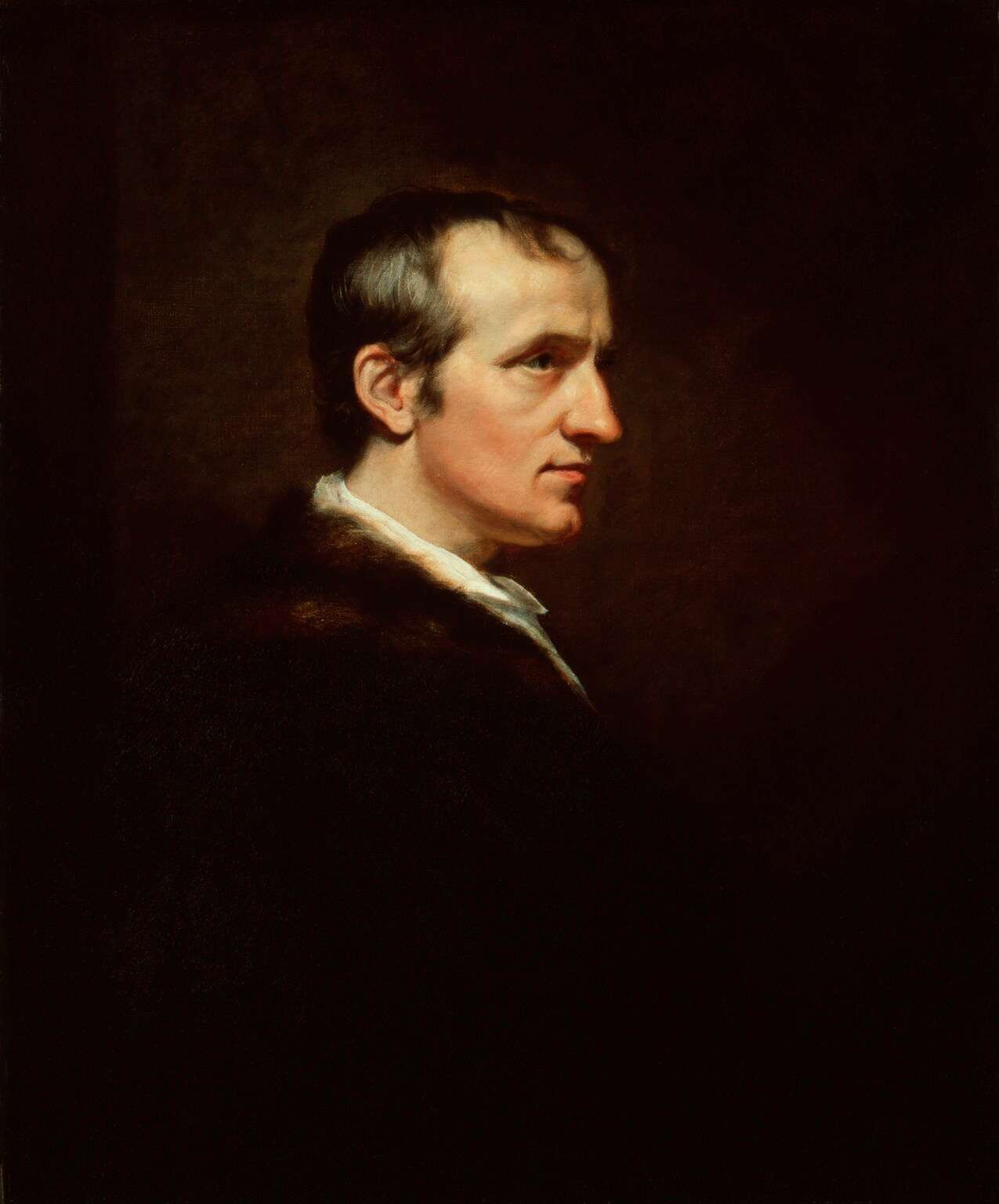
William Godwin, portrait by James Northcote, 1802

By the time Hazlitt wrote this sketch some thirty years after Godwin's glory years, the political climate had changed drastically, owing in large part to the British government's attempts to repress all thinking they deemed dangerous to the public peace. Consequently, Godwin, though he had never been an advocate of reform by violent means, had disappeared almost completely from the public eye. Hazlitt, at the start of his essay, focuses on this drastic change.

At the turn of the 19th century, notes Hazlitt, Godwin had been hailed as the philosopher who expounded "liberty, truth, justice". His masterwork, An Enquiry Concerning Political Justice, "gave ... a blow to the philosophical mind of the country". To those with a penchant for thinking about the human condition, Godwin was "the very God of our idolatry" who "carried with him all the most sanguine and fearless understandings of the time" and engaged the energy of a horde of "young men of talent, of education, and of principle." These included some of Hazlitt's most famous former friends, the poets Wordsworth, Coleridge, and Southey.

Twenty-five years later, Hazlitt looks back in astonishment that, in the interval, Godwin's reputation "has sunk below the horizon, and enjoys the serene twilight of a doubtful immortality." "The Spirit of the Age", he declares in the opening sentence, "was never more fully shown than in its treatment of this writer—its love of paradox and change, its dastard submission to prejudice and to the fashion of the day."

Yet there are problems with Godwin's philosophy, Hazlitt concedes. "The author of the Political Justice took abstract reason for the rule of conduct, and abstract good for its end. He absolves man from the gross and narrow ties of sense, custom, authority, private and local attachment, in order that he may devote himself to the boundless pursuit of universal benevolence." In its rules for determining the recipients of this benevolence, Godwin's philosophy goes further than Christianity in completely removing from consideration personal ties or anything but "the abstract merits, the pure and unbiassed justice of the case."

In practice, human nature can rarely live up to this exalted standard. "Every man ... was to be a Regulus, a Codrus, a Cato, or a Brutus—every woman a Mother of the Gracchi. ... But heroes on paper might degenerate into vagabonds in practice, Corinnas into courtezans." Hazlitt proceeds with several examples:

... a refined and permanent individual attachment is intended to supply the place and avoid the inconveniences of marriage; but vows of eternal constancy, without church security, are found to be fragile. ... The political as well as the religious fanatic appeals from the overweening opinion and claims of others to the highest and most impartial tribunal, namely, his own breast. ... A modest assurance was not the least indispensable virtue in the new perfectibility code; and it was hence discovered to be a scheme, like other schemes where there are all prizes and no blanks, for the accommodation of the enterprizing and cunning, at the expense of the credulous and honest. This broke up the system, and left no good odour behind it!

Yet the social failure of this attempt to guide our conduct by pure reason alone is no ground for discrediting reason itself. On the contrary, Hazlitt argues passionately, reason is the glue that binds civilisation together. And if reason can no longer be considered as "the sole and self-sufficient ground of morals", we must thank Godwin for having shown us why, by having "taken this principle, and followed it into its remotest consequences with more keenness of eye and steadiness of hand than any other expounder of ethics." By doing so, he has revealed "the weak sides and imperfections of human reason as the sole law of human action."

"The Spirit of the Age was never more fully shown than in its treatment of this writer—its love of paradox and change, its dastard submission to prejudice and to the fashion of the day."

— William Hazlitt, "William Godwin", The Spirit of the Age

Hazlitt moves on to Godwin's accomplishments as a novelist. For over a century, many critics took the best of his novels, Caleb Williams, as a kind of propaganda novel, written to impress the ideas of Political Justice on the minds of the multitude who could not grasp its philosophy; this was what Godwin himself had claimed in the book's preface. But Hazlitt was impressed by its strong literary qualities, and, to a lesser extent, those of St. Leon, exclaiming: "It is not merely that these novels are very well for a philosopher to have produced—they are admirable and complete in themselves, and would not lead you to suppose that the author, who is so entirely at home in human character and dramatic situation, had ever dabbled in logic or metaphysics."

Next Hazlitt compares Godwin's literary method to Sir Walter Scott's in the "Waverley Novels". Hazlitt devoted considerable thought to Scott's novels over several years, somewhat modifying his views about them; this is one of two discussions of them in this book, the other being in the essay on Scott. Here, it is Godwin's method that is seen as superior. Rather than, like Scott, creating novels out of "worm-eaten manuscripts ... forgotten chronicles, [or] fragments and snatches of old ballads", Godwin "fills up his subject with the ardent workings of his own mind, with the teeming and audible pulses of his own heart." On the other hand, the flaw in relying so intensively on one's own imagination is that one runs out of ideas. "He who draws upon his own resources, easily comes to an end of his wealth."

Hazlitt then comments on Godwin's other writings and the nature of his genius. His productions are not spontaneous but rather rely on long, laboured thought. This quality also limits Godwin's powers of conversation, so he fails to appear the man of genius he is. "In common company, Mr. Godwin either goes to sleep himself, or sets others to sleep." But Hazlitt closes his essay with personal recollections of the man (and, as with Bentham, a description of his appearance) that set him in a more positive light: "you perceive by your host's talk, as by the taste of seasoned wine, that he has a cellarage in his understanding."

The scholar, critic, and intellectual historian Basil Willey, writing a century later, thought that Hazlitt's "essay on Godwin in The Spirit of the Age is still the fairest and most discerning summary I know of".

=== Mr. Coleridge ===
Samuel Taylor Coleridge (1772–1834) was a poet, philosopher, literary critic, and theologian who was a major force behind the Romantic movement in England. No single person had meant more to Hazlitt's development as a writer than Coleridge, who changed the course of Hazlitt's life on their meeting in 1798. Afterwards at odds over politics, they became estranged, but Hazlitt continued to follow the intellectual development of one who answered more closely to his idea of a man of genius than anyone he had ever met, as he continued to chastise Coleridge and other former friends for their abandonment of the radical ideals they had once shared.

Unlike the accounts of Bentham and Godwin, Hazlitt's treatment of Coleridge in The Spirit of the Age presents no sketch of the man pursuing his daily life and habits. There is little about his appearance; the focus is primarily on the development of Coleridge's mind. Coleridge is a man of undoubted "genius", whose mind is "in the first class of general intellect". His problem is that he has been too bewitched by the mass of learning and literature from antiquity to the present time to focus on creating any truly lasting literary or philosophical work of his own, with the exception of a few striking poems early in his career.

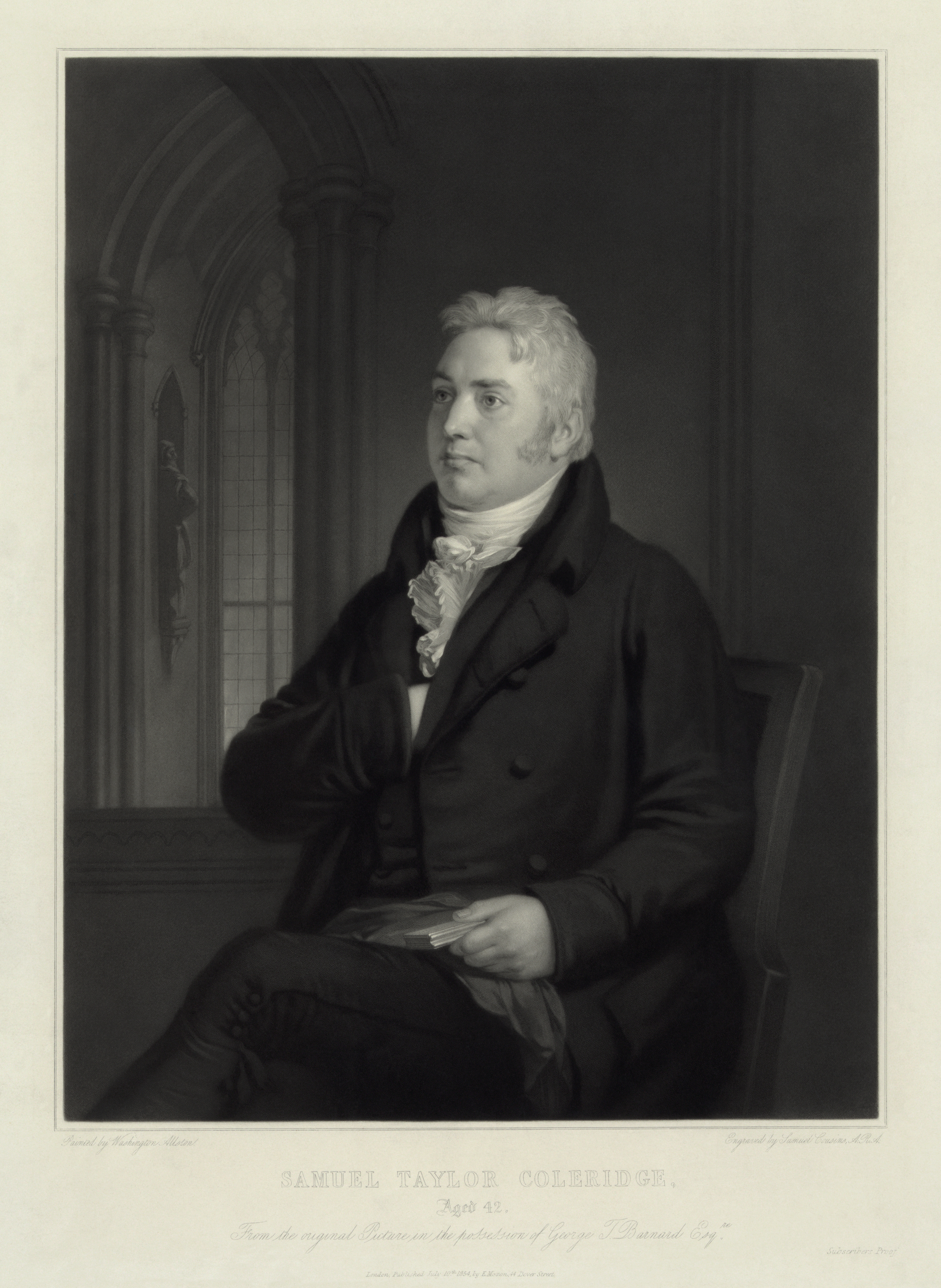
Samuel Taylor Coleridge at age 42. Engraving by Samuel Cousins from a painting by Washington Allston

In an extensive account later acclaimed as brilliant, even "a rhetorical summit of English prose", Hazlitt surveys the astonishing range and development of Coleridge's studies and literary productions, from the poetry he wrote as a youth, to his deep and extensive knowledge of Greek dramatists, "epic poets ... philosophers ... [and] orators". He notes Coleridge's profound and exhaustive exploration of more recent philosophy—including that of Hartley, Priestley, Berkeley, Leibniz, and Malebranche—and theologians such as Bishop Butler, John Huss, Socinus, Duns Scotus, Thomas Aquinas, Jeremy Taylor, and Swedenborg. He records Coleridge's fascination also with the poetry of Milton and Cowper, and the "wits of Charles the Second's days". Coleridge, he goes on, also "dallied with the British Essayists and Novelists, ... and Johnson, and Goldsmith, and Junius, and Burke, and Godwin ... and ... Rousseau, and Voltaire". And then, observes Hazlitt, Coleridge "lost himself in ... the Kantean philosophy, and ... Fichte and Schelling and Lessing".

Having followed in its breadth and depth Coleridge's entire intellectual career, Hazlitt now pauses to ask, "What is become of all this mighty heap of hope, of thought, of learning, and humanity? It has ended in swallowing doses of oblivion and in writing paragraphs in the Courier.—Such, and so little is the mind of man!"

Hazlitt treats Coleridge's failings more leniently here than he had in earlier accounts (as he does others of that circle who had with him earlier "hailed the rising orb of liberty"). It is to be understood, he explains, that any man of intellect born in that age, with its awareness of so much that had already been accomplished, might feel incapable of adding anything to the general store of knowledge or art. Hazlitt characterises the age itself as one of "talkers, and not of doers. ... The accumulation of knowledge has been so great, that we are lost in wonder at the height it has reached, instead of attempting to climb or add to it; while the variety of objects distracts and dazzles the looker-on." And "Mr. Coleridge [is] the most impressive talker of his age ...".

"What is become of all this mighty heap of hope, of thought, of learning, and humanity? It has ended in swallowing doses of oblivion and in writing paragraphs in the Courier.—Such, and so little is the mind of man!"

— William Hazlitt, "Mr. Coleridge", The Spirit of the Age

As for Coleridge's having gone over "to the unclean side" in politics, however regrettable, it may be understood by looking at the power then held by government-sponsored critics of any who seemed to threaten the established order. "The flame of liberty, the light of intellect was to be extinguished with the sword—or with slander, whose edge is sharper than the sword." Though Coleridge did not go as far as some of his colleagues in accepting a government office in exchange for withholding criticism of the current order, neither did he, in Hazlitt's account, align himself with such philosophers as Godwin, who, overtly steadfast in their principles, could be more resistant to "discomfiture, persecution, and disgrace."

Following his typical method of explaining by antitheses, Hazlitt contrasts Coleridge and Godwin. The latter, having far less general capacity, nevertheless was capable of fully utilising his talents by focusing intently on work he was capable of; while the former, "by dissipating his [mind], and dallying with every subject by turns, has done little or nothing to justify to the world or to posterity, the high opinion which all who have ever heard him converse, or known him intimately, with one accord entertain of him."

Critic David Bromwich finds in what Hazlitt does portray of Coleridge the man—metaphorically depicting the state of his mind—as rich with allusions to earlier poets and "echoes" of Coleridge's own poetry:

Mr. Coleridge has a "mind reflecting ages past": his voice is like the echo of the congregated roar of the 'dark rearward and abyss' of thought. He who has seen a mouldering tower by the side of a chrystal lake, hid by the mist, but glittering in the wave below, may conceive the dim, gleaming, uncertain intelligence of his eye; he who has marked the evening clouds uprolled (a world of vapours), has seen the picture of his mind, unearthly, unsubstantial, with gorgeous tints and ever-varying forms ...

=== Rev. Mr. Irving ===
The Reverend Edward Irving (1792–1834) was a Scottish Presbyterian minister who, beginning in 1822, created a sensation in London with his fiery sermons denouncing the manners, practices, and beliefs of the time. His sermons at the Caledonian Asylum Chapel were attended by crowds that included the rich, the powerful, and the fashionable. Hazlitt was present on at least one occasion, 22 June 1823, as a reporter for The Liberal.

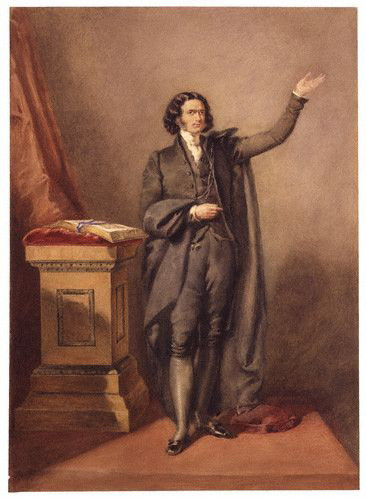
Edward Irving, c. 1823, artist unknown

Curious visitors to the chapel, along with some uneasy regular members of the congregation, would have been faced with a man of "uncommon height, a graceful figure and action, a clear and powerful voice, a striking, if not a fine face, a bold and fiery spirit, and a most portentous obliquity of vision" with, despite this slight defect, "elegance" of "the most admirable symmetry of form and ease of gesture", as well as "sable locks", a "clear iron-grey complexion, and firm-set features".

Moreover, with the sheer novelty of a combination of the traits of an actor, a preacher, an author—even a pugilist—Irving

keeps the public in awe by insulting all their favourite idols. He does not spare their politicians, their rulers, their moralists, their poets, their players, their critics, their reviewers, their magazine-writers .... He makes war upon all arts and sciences, upon the faculties and nature of man, on his vices and virtues, on all existing institutions, and all possible improvement ...

Irving, with his reactionary stance, has "opposed the spirit of the age". Among those subjected to Irving's brutal verbal onslaughts were "Jeremy Bentham ... [with Irving looking] over the heads of his congregation to have a hit at the Great Jurisconsult in his study", as well as "Mr. Brougham ... Mr. Canning ... Mr. Coleridge ... and ... Lord Liverpool" (Prime Minister at the time). Of these notable figures, only Lord Liverpool did not rate his own chapter in The Spirit of the Age.

But Irving's popularity, which Hazlitt suspected would not last, was a sign of another tendency of the age: "Few circumstances show the prevailing and preposterous rage for novelty in a more striking point of view, than the success of Mr. Irving's oratory."

"Few circumstances show the prevailing and preposterous rage for novelty in a more striking point of view, than the success of Mr. Irving's oratory."

— William Hazlitt, "Rev. Mr. Irving", The Spirit of the Age

Part of Irving's appeal was due to the increased influence of evangelical Christianity, notes historian Ben Wilson; the phenomenon of an Edward Irving preaching to the great and famous would have been inconceivable thirty years earlier. But the novelty of such a hitherto unseen combination of talents, Wilson concurs with Hazlitt, played no small part in Irving's popularity. And the inescapable fact of Irving's dominating physical presence, Wilson also agrees, had its effect. "William Hazlitt believed that no one would have gone to hear Irving had he been five feet high, ugly and soft-spoken."

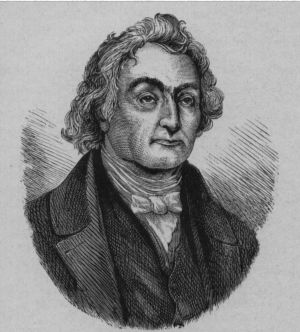
The Rev. Dr. Thomas Chalmers

As a case in point, Hazlitt brings in Irving's own mentor, the Scottish theologian, scientist, philosopher, and minister Dr. Thomas Chalmers (1780–1847), whom Hazlitt had heard preach in Glasgow. Comparing the published writings of both men, Chalmers was, thought Hazlitt, much more interesting as a thinker. Although he ultimately dismisses Chalmers' arguments as "sophistry", Hazlitt admires the elder clergyman's "scope of intellect" and "intensity of purpose". His Astronomical Discourses were engaging enough that Hazlitt had eagerly read through the entire volume at a sitting. His claim to our attention must rest on his writings; his unprepossessing appearance and ungainly manner in themselves, maintains Hazlitt, drew no audience. Chalmers' follower Irving, on the other hand, gets by on the strength of his towering physique and the novelty of his performances; judging him as a writer (his For the Oracles of God, Four Orations had just gone into a third edition), Hazlitt finds that "the ground work of his compositions is trashy and hackneyed, though set off by extravagant metaphors and an affected phraseology ... without the turn of his head and wave of his hand, his periods have nothing in them ... he himself is the only idea with which he has yet enriched the public mind!"

John Kinnaird suggests that in this essay, Hazlitt, with his "penetration" and "characteristically ruthless regard for truth", in his reference to Irving's "portentous obliquity of vision" insinuates that "one eye of Irving's imagination ... looks up to a wrathful God cast in his own image, 'endowed with all his own ... irritable humours in an infinitely exaggerated degree' [while] the other is always squinting askew at the prestigious image of Edward Irving reflected in the gaze of his fashionable audience—and especially in the rapt admiration of the 'female part of his congregation'".

Kinnaird also notes that Hazlitt's criticism of Irving anticipated the judgement of Irving's friend, the essayist, historian, and social critic Thomas Carlyle, in his account of Irving's untimely death a few years later.

=== The Late Mr. Horne Tooke ===
John Horne Tooke (1736–1812) was an English reformer, grammarian, clergyman, and politician. He became especially known for his support of radical causes and involvement in debates about political reform, and was briefly a Member of the British Parliament. He was also known for his ideas about English grammar, published in ἔπεα πτερόεντα, or The Diversions of Purley (1786, 1805).

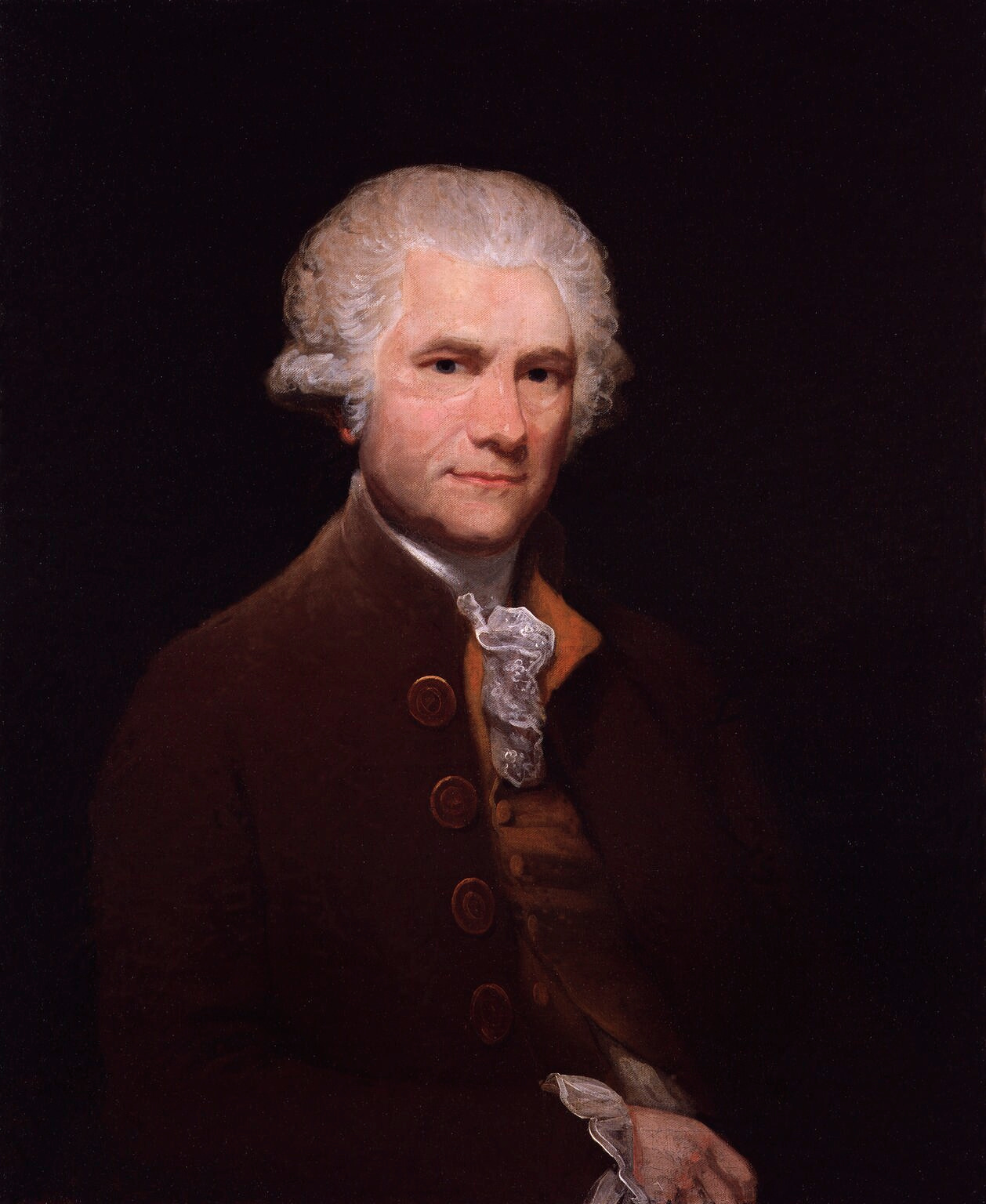
John Horne Tooke, by Thomas Hardy, before 1791

By the time he was profiled as the third of "The Spirits of the Age" in Hazlitt's original series, Tooke had been dead for a dozen years. He was significant to Hazlitt as a "connecting link" between the previous age and the present. Hazlitt had known Tooke personally, having attended gatherings at his home next to Wimbledon Common until about 1808.

"Mr. Horne Tooke", writes Hazlitt, "was in private company, and among his friends, the finished gentleman of the last age. His manners were as fascinating as his conversation was spirited and delightful." Yet "his mind, and the tone of his feelings were modern." He delighted in raillery, and prided himself on his cool, even temper. "He was a man of the world, a scholar bred, and a most acute and powerful logician ... his intellect was like a bow of polished steel, from which he shot sharp-pointed poisoned arrows at his friends in private, at his enemies in public." Yet his thinking was one-sided: "he had no imagination ... no delicacy of taste, no rooted prejudices or strong attachments".

Tooke's greatest delight, as seen by Hazlitt, was in contradiction, in startling others with radical ideas that at the time were considered shocking: "It was curious to hear our modern sciolist advancing opinions of the most radical kind without any mixture of radical heat or violence, in a tone of fashionable nonchalance, with elegance of gesture and attitude, and with the most perfect good-humour."

His mastery of the art of verbal fencing was such that many eagerly sought invitation to his private gatherings, where they could "admire" his skills "or break a lance with him." With a rapier wit, Tooke excelled in situations where "a ready repartee, a shrewd cross-question, ridicule and banter, a caustic remark or an amusing anecdote, whatever set [himself] off to advantage, or gratifie[d] the curiosity or piqued the self-love of the hearers, [could] keep ... attention alive and secure[d] his triumph ...." As a "satirist" and "a sophist" he could provoke "admiration by expressing his contempt for each of his adversaries in turn, and by setting their opinion at defiance."

"It was his delight to make mischief and spoil sport. He would rather be against himself than for any body else."

— William Hazlitt, "The Late Mr. Horne Tooke", The Spirit of the Age

Tooke was in Hazlitt's view much less successful in public life. In private, he could be seen at his best and afford amusement by "say[ing] the most provoking things with a laughing gaiety". In public, as when he briefly served as a member of parliament, this attitude would not do. He did not really seem to believe in any great "public cause" or "show ... sympathy with the general and predominant feelings of mankind." Hazlitt explains that "it was his delight to make mischief and spoil sport. He would rather be against himself than for any body else."

Hazlitt also notes that there was more to Tooke's popular gatherings than verbal repartee. Having been involved in politics over a long life, Tooke could captivate his audience with his anecdotes, especially in his later years:

He knew all the cabals and jealousies and heart-burnings in the beginning of the late reign [of King George III], the changes of administration and the springs of secret influence, the characters of the leading men, Wilkes, Barrè, Dunning, Chatham, Burke, the Marquis of Rockingham, North, Shelburne, Fox, Pitt, and all the vacillating events of the American war:—these formed a curious back-ground to the more prominent figures that occupied the present time ...

Hazlitt felt that Tooke would be longest remembered, however, for his ideas about English grammar. By far the most popular English grammar of the early 19th century was that of Lindley Murray, and, in his typical method of criticism by antitheses, Hazlitt points out what he considers to be its glaring deficiencies compared to that of Tooke: "Mr. Lindley Murray's Grammar ... confounds the genius of the English language, making it periphrastic and literal, instead of elliptical and idiomatic." Murray, as well as other, earlier grammarians, often provided "endless details and subdivisions"; Tooke, in his work commonly known by its alternate title of The Diversions of Purley, "clears away the rubbish of school-boy technicalities, and strikes at the root of his subject." Tooke's mind was particularly suited for his task, as it was "hard, unbending, concrete, physical, half-savage ..." and he could see "language stripped of the clothing of habit or sentiment, or the disguises of doting pedantry, naked in its cradle, and in its primitive state." That Murray's book should have been the grammar to have "proceeded to [its] thirtieth edition" and find a place in all the schools instead of "Horne Tooke's genuine anatomy of the English tongue" makes it seem, exclaims Hazlitt, "as if there was a patent for absurdity in the natural bias of the human mind, and that folly should be stereotyped!".

A century and a half later, critic John Kinnaird saw this essay on Horne Tooke as being essential to Hazlitt's implicit development of his idea of the "spirit of the age". Not only did Tooke's thinking partake of the excessive "abstraction" that was becoming so dominant, it constituted opposition for the sake of opposition, thereby becoming an impediment to any real human progress. It was this sort of contrariness, fuelled by "self-love", that, according to Kinnaird, is manifested in many of the later subjects of the essays in The Spirit of the Age.

Hazlitt's criticism of Tooke's grammatical work has also been singled out. Critic Tom Paulin notes the way Hazlitt's subtle choice of language hints at the broader, politically radical implications of Tooke's linguistic achievement. Paulin observes also that Hazlitt, himself the author of an English grammar influenced by Tooke, recognised the importance of Tooke's grammatical ideas in a way that presaged and accorded with the radical grammatical work of William Cobbett, whom Hazlitt sketched in a later essay in The Spirit of the Age.

=== Sir Walter Scott ===
Sir Walter Scott (1771–1832), a Scottish lawyer and man of letters, was the most popular poet and, beginning in 1814, writing novels anonymously as "The Author of Waverley ", the most popular author in the English language. Hazlitt was an admirer as well as a reviewer of Scott's fiction, yet he never met the man, despite ample opportunities to do so.

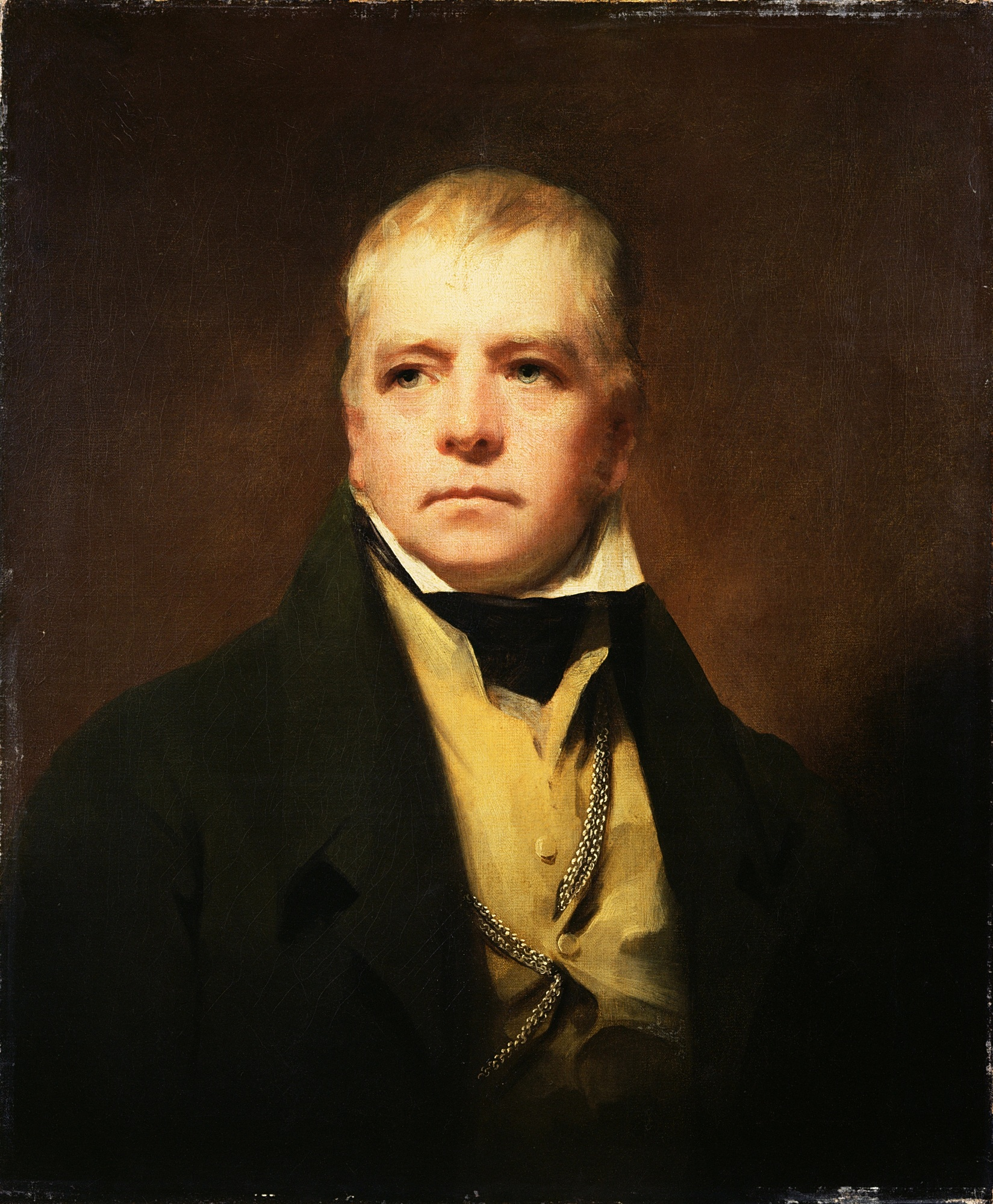
Portrait of Sir Walter Scott by Henry Raeburn, 1822–1823

In Hazlitt's view, the essence of Scott's mind lay in its "brooding over antiquity." The past provided nearly all his subject matter; he showed little interest in depicting modern life. This was true of his poetry as much as his prose. But, in Hazlitt's view, as a poet, his success was limited, even as a chronicler of the past. His poetry, concedes Hazlitt, has "great merit", abounding "in vivid descriptions, in spirited action, in smooth and glowing versification." Yet it is wanting in "character ". Though composed of "quaint, uncouth, rugged materials", it is varnished over with a "smooth, glossy texture ... It is light, agreeable, effeminate, diffuse." Hazlitt declares, "We would rather have written one song of Burns, or a single passage in Lord Byron's Heaven and Earth, or one of Wordsworth's 'fancies and good-nights,' than all of [Scott's] epics."

The matter is altogether different with Scott the novelist. The poems were read because they were fashionable. But the popularity of the novels was such that fanatically devoted readers fiercely debated the respective merits of their favourite characters and scenes. Hazlitt, whose reviews had been highly favourable and appreciated these books as much as anyone, here elaborates on his own favourites, after first discussing a qualifying issue. The greatest literary artists, Hazlitt had pointed out in the essay on Godwin, give shape to their creations by infusing them with imagination. As creator of such works as Old Mortality, The Heart of Midlothian, and Ivanhoe, Scott, adhering closely to his sources, restricts his imaginative investment in the story, hemming himself in by the historical facts. Even so, he manages to bring the past to life. He is the "amanuensis of truth and history" by means of a rich array of characters and situations. Hazlitt recalls these characters in a rhapsodic passage, described by critic John Kinnaird as "a stunning pageant, two pages in length, of more than forty Scott characters, which he summons individually from his memory, citing for each some quality or act or association which makes them unforgettable."

From Waverley, the first of these books, published in 1814, he recalls "the Baron of Bradwardine, stately, kind-hearted, whimsical, pedantic; and Flora MacIvor". Next, in Old Mortality, there are

that lone figure, like a figure in Scripture, of the woman sitting on the stone at the turning to the mountain, to warn Burley [of Balfour] that there is a lion in his path; and the fawning Claverhouse, beautiful as a panther, smooth-looking, blood-spotted; and the fanatics, Macbriar and Mucklewrath, crazed with zeal and sufferings; and the inflexible Morton, and the faithful Edith, who refused "to give her hand to another while her heart was with her lover in the deep and dead sea." And in The Heart of Midlothian we have Effie Deans (that sweet, faded flower) and Jeanie, her more than sister, and old David Deans, the patriarch of St. Leonard's Crags, and Butler, and Dumbiedikes, eloquent in his silence, and Mr. Bartoline Saddle-tree and his prudent helpmate, and Porteous, swinging in the wind, and Madge Wildfire, full of finery and madness, and her ghastly mother.

He continues enthusiastically through dozens of others, exclaiming, "What a list of names! What a host of associations! What a thing is human life! What a power is that of genius! ... His works (taken together) are almost like a new edition of human nature. This is indeed to be an author!"

Scott's "works (taken together) are almost like a new edition of human nature. This is indeed to be an author!"

— William Hazlitt, "Sir Walter Scott", The Spirit of the Age

Writing a century and a half later, critic John Kinnaird observes that Hazlitt was "Scott's greatest contemporary critic" and wrote the first important criticism of the novel, particularly in the form it was then beginning to assume. Hazlitt's thinking on the new historical fiction of Scott was in the process of evolving. Earlier, even to an extent in this essay, he had downplayed the novels as being little more than a transcription from old chronicles. But Hazlitt had begun to recognise the degree of imagination Scott had to apply in order to bring dry facts to life.

Hazlitt also recognised that, at his best, Scott conveyed his characters' traits and beliefs impartially, setting aside his own political bias. Having faithfully and disinterestedly described "nature" in all its detail was in itself a praiseworthy accomplishment. "It is impossible", writes Hazlitt, "to say how fine his writings in consequence are, unless we could describe how fine nature is." Kinnaird also notes Hazlitt's psychologically acute observation of how Scott, in taking us back to our more primitive past, recognised "the role of the repressed unconscious self in shaping modern literary imagination." He sees Hazlitt, too, in The Spirit of the Age along with some other essays, as the first to recognise how Scott traced the action of historical forces through individual characters.

Scott the man, laments Hazlitt, was quite different from Scott the poet and novelist. Even in his fiction, there is a notable bias, in his dramatisation of history, toward romanticising the age of chivalry and glorifying "the good old times". Hazlitt sarcastically observes that Scott appeared to want to obliterate all of the achievements of centuries of civilised reform and revive the days when "witches and heretics" were burned "at slow fires", and men could be "strung up like acorns on trees without judge or jury".

Scott was known to be a staunch Tory. But what especially roused Hazlitt's ire was his association with the unprincipled publisher William Blackwood, the ringleader of a pack of literary thugs hired to smear the reputations of writers who expressed radical or liberal political views. One of the pack was Scott's own son-in-law, John Gibson Lockhart. Hazlitt grants that Scott was "amiable, frank, friendly, manly in private life" and showed "candour and comprehensiveness of view for history". Yet he also "vented his littleness, pique, resentment, bigotry, and intolerance on his contemporaries". Hazlitt concludes this account by lamenting that the man who was "(by common consent) the finest, most humane and accomplished writer of his age [could have] associated himself with and encouraged the lowest panders of a venal press ... we believe that there is no other age or country of the world (but ours), in which such genius could have been so degraded!"

=== Lord Byron ===
Lord Byron (1788–1824) was the most popular poet of his day, a major figure of the English Romantic movement, and an international celebrity. Although Hazlitt never met Byron, he had been following his career for years. Besides reviewing his poetry and some of his prose, Hazlitt had contributed to The Liberal, a journal Byron helped establish but later abandoned.

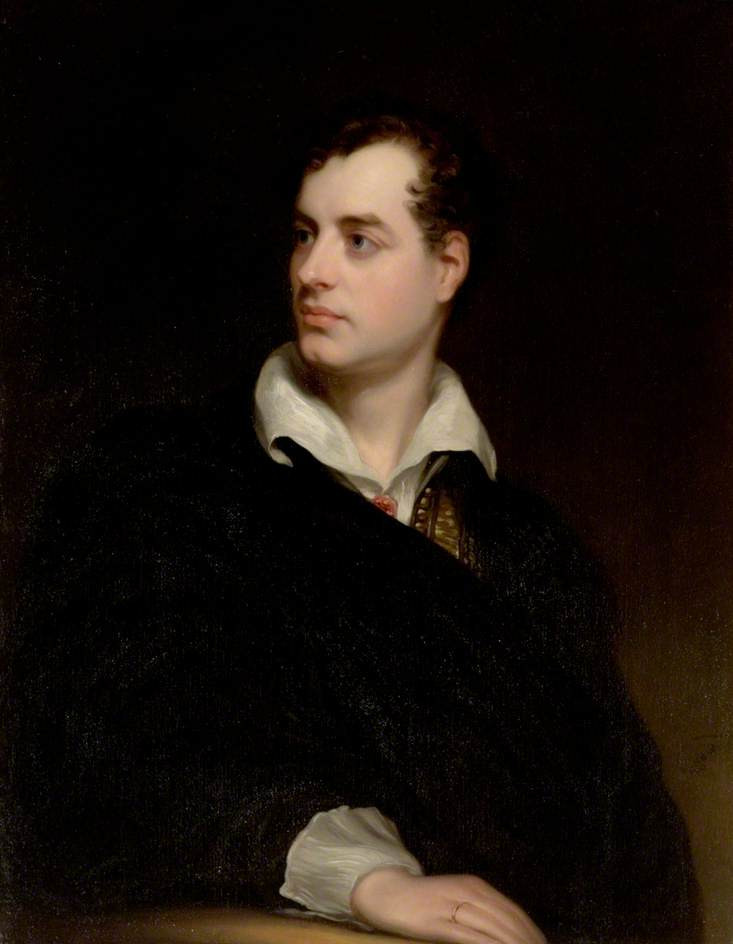
Portrait of Lord Byron by Thomas Phillipps

"Intensity", writes Hazlitt, "is the great and prominent distinction of Lord Byron's writing. ... He grapples with his subject, and moves, and animates it by the electric force of his own feelings ... he is never dull". His style is "rich and dipped in Tyrian dyes ... an object of delight and wonder". Though he begins with "commonplaces", he "takes care to adorn his subject matter "with 'thoughts that breathe and words that burn' ... we always find the spirit of the man of genius breathing from his verse". In Childe Harold's Pilgrimage, for example, though the subject matter is no more than "what is familiar to the mind of every school boy", Byron makes of it a "lofty and impassioned view of the great events of history", "he shows us the crumbling monuments of time, he invokes the great names, the mighty spirit of antiquity." Hazlitt continues, "Lord Byron has strength and elevation enough to fill up the moulds of our classical and time-hallowed recollections, and to rekindle the earliest aspirations of the mind after greatness and true glory with a pen of fire."

Despite being impressed by such passages, Hazlitt also voices serious reservations about Byron's poetry as a whole: "He seldom gets beyond force of style, nor has he produced any regular work or masterly whole." Hazlitt mentions having heard that Byron composed at odd times, whether inspired or not, and this shows in the results, with Byron "chiefly think[ing] how he shall display his own power, or vent his spleen, or astonish the reader either by starting new subjects and trains of speculation, or by expressing old ones in a more striking and emphatic manner than they have been expressed before."

Such "wild and gloomy romances" like "Lara, the Corsair, etc.", while often showing "inspiration", also reveal "the madness of poetry", being "sullen, moody, capricious, fierce, inexorable, gloating on beauty, thirsting for revenge, hurrying from the extremes of pleasure to pain, but with nothing permanent, nothing healthy or natural".

Byron's dramas are undramatic. "They abound in speeches and descriptions, such as he himself might make either to himself or others, lolling on his couch of a morning, but do not carry the reader out of the poet's mind to the scenes and events recorded." In this Byron follows most of his contemporaries, as Hazlitt argued in many of his critical writings, the tendency of the age, in imaginative literature as well as philosophical and scientific, being toward generalisation, "abstraction". Also counteracting his immense power, the tone of even some of the best of Byron's poetry is violated by annoying descents into the ridiculous. "You laugh and are surprised that any one should turn round and travestie himself". This is shown especially in the early parts of Don Juan, where, "after the lightning and the hurricane, we are introduced to the interior of the cabin and the contents of wash-hand basins." After noting several such provoking incongruities, Hazlitt characterises Don Juan overall as "a poem written about itself" (he reserves judgement about the later cantos of that poem).

The range of Byron's characters, Hazlitt contends, is too narrow. Returning again and again to the type that would later be called the "Byronic hero", "Lord Byron makes man after his own image, woman after his own heart; the one is a capricious tyrant, the other a yielding slave; he gives us the misanthrope and the voluptuary by turns; and with these two characters, burning or melting in their own fires, he makes out everlasting centos of himself."

Byron, observes Hazlitt, was born an aristocrat, but "he is the spoiled child of fame as well as fortune." Always parading himself before the public, he is not satisfied simply to be admired; he "is not contented to delight, unless he can shock the public. He would force them to admire in spite of decency and common sense. ... His Lordship is hard to please: he is equally averse to notice or neglect, enraged at censure and scorning praise." In his poetry—Hazlitt's example is the drama Cain—Byron "floats on swelling paradoxes" and "panders to the spirit of the age, goes to the very edge of extreme and licentious speculation, and breaks his neck over it."

Lord Byron "is not contented to delight, unless he can shock the public. He would force them to admire in spite of decency and common sense. ... His Lordship is hard to please: he is equally averse to notice or neglect, enraged at censure and scorning praise."

— William Hazlitt, "Lord Byron", The Spirit of the Age

In the course of characterising Byron, Hazlitt glances back to Scott, subject of the preceding chapter, and forward to Wordsworth and Southey, each of whom secures his own essay later in The Spirit of the Age. Scott, the only one of these writers who rivals Byron in popularity, notes Hazlitt in a lengthy comparison, keeps his own character offstage in his works; he is content to present "nature" in all its variety. Scott "takes in half the universe in feeling, character, description"; Byron, on the other hand, "shuts himself up in the Bastile of his own ruling passions."

While Byron's poetry, with all its power, is founded on "commonplaces", Wordsworth's poetry expresses something new, raising seemingly insignificant objects of nature to supreme significance. He is capable of seeing the profundity, conveying the effect on the heart, of a "daisy or a periwinkle", thus lifting poetry from the ground, "creat[ing] a sentiment out of nothing." Byron, according to Hazlitt, does not show this kind of originality.

As for Robert Southey, Byron satirised Southey's poem "A Vision of Judgment"— which celebrates the late King George III's ascent to heaven—with his own The Vision of Judgment. Although Hazlitt says he does not much care for Byron's satires (criticising especially the heavy-handedness of the early English Bards and Scotch Reviewers), he grants that "the extravagance and license of [Byron's poem] seems a proper antidote to the bigotry and narrowness of" Southey's.

Hazlitt argues that "the chief cause of most of Lord Byron's errors is, that he is that anomaly in letters and in society, a Noble Poet. ... His muse is also a lady of quality. The people are not polite enough for him: the court not sufficiently intellectual. He hates the one and despises the other. By hating and despising others, he does not learn to be satisfied with himself."

In conclusion—at least his originally intended conclusion—Hazlitt notes that Byron was now in Greece attempting to aid a revolt against Turkish occupation. With this sentence the chapter would have ended; but Hazlitt adds another paragraph, beginning with an announcement that he has just then learned of Byron's death. This sobering news, he says, has put "an end at once to a strain of somewhat peevish invective".

Rather than withhold what he has written or refashion it into a eulogy, however, Hazlitt maintains that it is "more like [Byron] himself" to let stand words that were "intended to meet his eye, not to insult his memory." "Death", Hazlitt concludes, "cancels everything but truth; and strips a man of everything but genius and virtue." Byron's accomplishments will be judged by posterity. "A poet's cemetery is the human mind, in which he sows the seeds of never-ending thought—his monument is to be found in his works. ... Lord Byron is dead: he also died a martyr to his zeal in the cause of freedom, for the first, last, best hopes of man. Let that be his excuse and his epitaph!"

While Hazlitt showed an "obvious relish" for some of Byron's poetry, on the whole his attitude toward Byron was never simple, and later critics' assessments of Hazlitt's view of Byron's poetry diverge radically. Andrew Rutherford, who includes most of The Spirit of the Age essay on Lord Byron in an anthology of criticism of Byron, himself expresses the belief that Hazlitt had a "distaste for Byron's works". Biographer Duncan Wu, on the other hand, simply notes Hazlitt's admiration for the "power" of Don Juan. Biographer A. C. Grayling asserts that Hazlitt "was consistent in praising his 'intensity of conception and expression' and his 'wildness of invention, brilliant and elegant fancy, [and] caustic wit'." John Kinnaird judges that Hazlitt, in assessing the relative merits of Wordsworth's and Byron's poetry, dismisses too readily as morbid the obsession with death in Byron's poetry, thus minimising one of its strengths. David Bromwich emphasises the significance of Hazlitt's observation that Byron thought he stood "above his own reputation", pointing out that Hazlitt ties this attitude to Byron's imperfect sympathy with the feelings common to all humanity, which in turn undermines the best in his poetry and diminishes its value relative to the best of Wordsworth's.

=== Mr. Southey ===
Robert Southey (1774–1843) was a prolific author of poetry, essays, histories, biographies, and translations, and Poet Laureate of the United Kingdom from 1813 to 1843. Hazlitt first met Southey in London in 1799. The two, along with Coleridge and Wordsworth, whom he had met not long before, were swept up in the movement supporting the rights of the common man that inspired much of the educated English population in the wake of the French Revolution. During his brief career as a painter, until about 1803, Hazlitt spent time in the Lake District with Southey and the others, where they debated the future improvement of society as they rambled over the countryside.

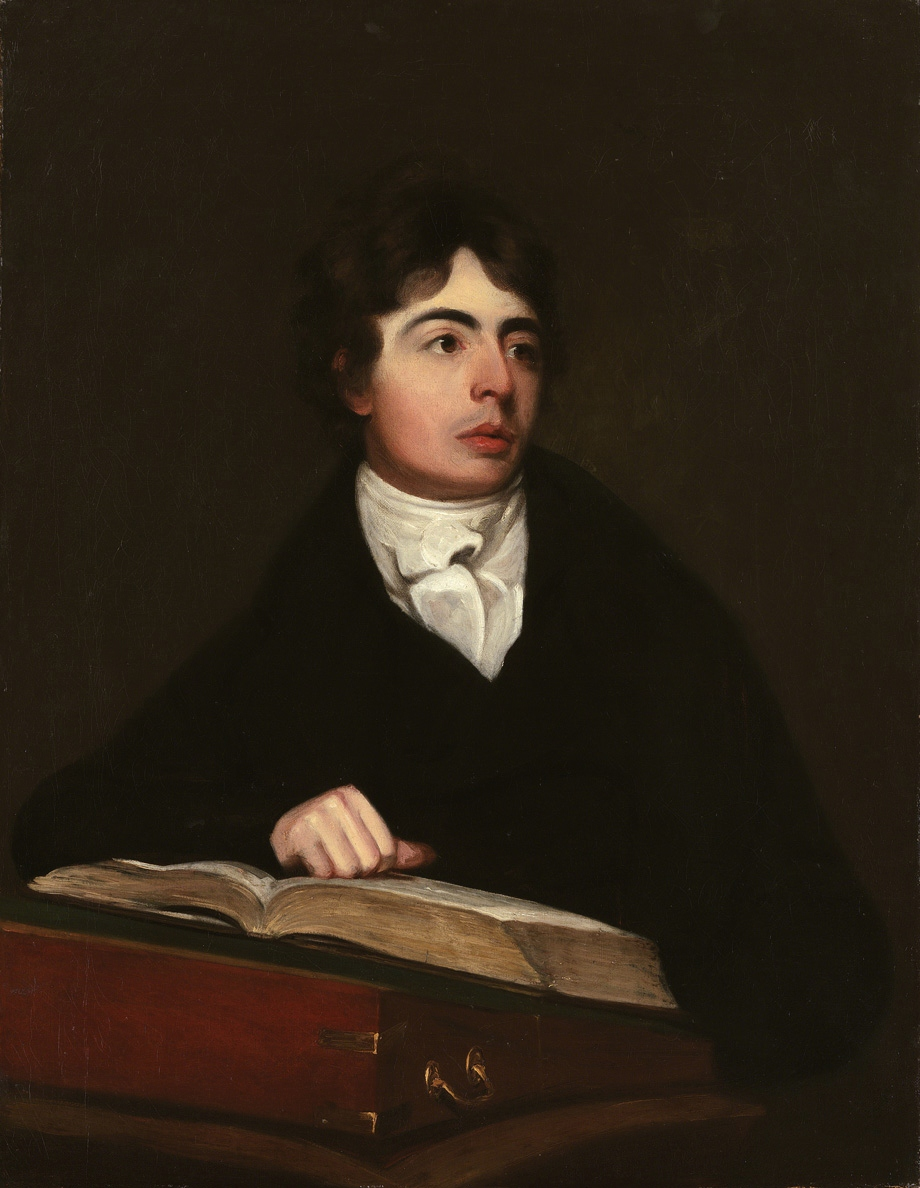
Robert Southey, by John James Masquerier, 1800

Years earlier, a reaction by the establishment to the reformers had already begun to set in, and, after another fifteen years, the English political atmosphere had become stifling to the champions of liberty. Wordsworth, Coleridge, and Southey all shifted their political allegiance to the right, which, among other things, drove a wedge between them and Hazlitt. The alteration in Southey's politics was the sharpest. His earlier extreme radical position was implied in his play Wat Tyler, which seemed to advocate violent revolt by the lower classes. Now he expressed a stance of absolute support of the severest reprisals against any who dared criticise the government, declaring that "a Reformer is a worse character than a housebreaker". This opinion was put forth in an article in the conservative Quarterly Review, published—anonymously but widely believed (and later confessed) to be Southey's—in 1817, the same year his Wat Tyler was brought to light and published against his will, to Southey's embarrassment. Hazlitt's reaction to Southey's abrupt about-face was a savage attack in the liberal Examiner. Wordsworth and Coleridge supported Southey and tried to discredit Hazlitt's attacks.

By 1824, when Hazlitt reviewed the history of his relationship with Southey, his anger had considerably subsided. As with the other character sketches in The Spirit of the Age, he did his best to treat his subject impartially.

He opens this essay with a painterly image of Southey as an embodiment of self-contradiction: "We formerly remember to have seen him [with] a hectic flush on his cheek [and] a smile betwixt hope and sadness that still played upon his quivering lip." Hazlitt continues:

While he supposed it possible that a better form of society could be introduced than any that had hitherto existed ... he was an enthusiast, a fanatic, a leveller ... in his impatience of the smallest error or injustice, he would have sacrificed himself and his generation (a holocaust) to his devotion to the right cause. But when ... his chimeras and golden dreams of human perfectibility once vanished from him, he turned suddenly round, and maintained that "whatever is, is right".... He is ever in extremes, and ever in the wrong!

In a detailed psychological analysis, Hazlitt explains Southey's self-contradiction: rather than being wedded to truth, he is attached to his own opinions, which depend on "the indulgence of vanity, of caprice, [of] prejudice ... regulated by the convenience or bias of the moment." As a "politician", he is governed by a temperament that is fanciful, "poetical, not philosophical." He "has not patience to think that evil is inseparable from the nature of things." Hazlitt's explanation is that, despite Southey's changing opinions, based on "impressions [that] are accidental, immediate, personal", he is "of all mortals the most impatient of contradiction, even when he has turned the tables on himself." This is because at bottom he knows his opinions have nothing solid to back them. "Is he not jealous of the grounds of his belief, because he fears they will not bear inspection, or is conscious he has shifted them? ... He maintains that there can be no possible ground for differing from him, because he looks only at his own side of the question!" "He treats his opponents with contempt, because he is himself afraid of meeting with disrespect! He says that 'a Reformer is a worse character than a house-breaker,' in order to stifle the recollection that he himself once was one!"

Despite Southey's then assumed public "character of poet-laureat and courtier", his character at bottom is better suited to the role of reformer. "Mr. Southey is not of the court, courtly. Every thing of him and about him is from the people." As evidenced in his writings, "he bows to no authority; he yields only to his own wayward peculiarities." His poetic eulogy of the late King George III, for example, which had been mercilessly mocked by Byron, was, oddly, also a poetic experiment, "a specimen of what might be done in English hexameters."

Mr. Southey is "ever in extremes, and ever in the wrong!"

— William Hazlitt, "Mr. Southey", The Spirit of the Age

Surveying the range of Southey's voluminous writings, constituting a virtual library, Hazlitt finds worth noting "the spirit, the scope, the splendid imagery, the hurried and startled interest" of his long narrative poems, with their exotic subject matter. His prose volumes of history, biography, and translations from Spanish and Portuguese authors, while they lack originality, are well researched and are written in a "plain, clear, pointed, familiar, perfectly modern" style that is better than that of any other poet of the day, and "can scarcely be too much praised." In his prose, "there is no want of playful or biting satire, of ingenuity, of casuistry, of learning and of information."

Southey's major failing is that, with a spirit of free inquiry that he cannot suppress in himself, he attempts to suppress free inquiry in others. Yet, even in Southey's political writings, Hazlitt credits him as refraining from advocating what might be practised by "those whose hearts are naturally callous to truth, and whose understandings are hermetically sealed against all impressions but those of self-interest". He remains, after all, "a reformist without knowing it. He does not advocate the slave-trade, he does not arm Mr. Malthus's revolting ratios with his authority, he does not strain hard to deluge Ireland with blood."

In Southey's personal appearance, there is something eccentric, even off-putting: he "walks with his chin erect through the streets of London, and with an umbrella sticking out under his arm, in the finest weather." "With a tall, loose figure, a peaked austerity of countenance, and no inclination to embonpoint, you would say he has something puritanical, something ascetic in his appearance." Hazlitt hopes the negative aspects of his character will dissipate, wishing that Southey live up to his own ideal as expressed in his poem "The Holly-Tree" so that "as he mellows into maturer age, all [his] asperities may wear off...."

Continuing with a more balanced view than any he had expressed before, Hazlitt notes Southey's many fine qualities: he is a tireless worker, "is constant, unremitting, mechanical in his studies, and the performance of his duties. ... In all the relations and charities of private life, he is correct, exemplary, generous, just. We never heard a single impropriety laid to his charge." "With some gall in his pen, and coldness in his manner, he has a great deal of kindness in his heart. Rash in his opinions", concludes Hazlitt, Southey "is steady in his attachments—and is a man, in many particulars admirable, in all respectable—his political inconsistency alone excepted!"

Historian Crane Brinton a century later applauded Hazlitt's "fine critical intelligence" in judging Southey's character and works. Later, Tom Paulin, with admiration for the richness of Hazlitt's style, traced his writing on Southey from the "savage" attacks in 1816 and 1817 through the more balanced assessment in this sketch. Paulin especially notes allusive and tonal subtleties in Hazlitt's poetic prose that served to highlight, or at times subtly qualify, the portrait of Southey he was trying to paint. This, Paulin observes, is an example of how Hazlitt "invest[s] his vast, complex aesthetic terminology with a Shakespearean richness ... perhaps the only critic in English" to do so.

=== Mr. Wordsworth ===
William Wordsworth (1770–1850) was an English poet, often considered, with Samuel Taylor Coleridge, to have inaugurated the Romantic movement in English poetry with the publication in 1798 of their Lyrical Ballads. Hazlitt was introduced to Wordsworth by Coleridge, and both had a shaping influence on him, who was privileged to have read Lyrical Ballads in manuscript. Though Hazlitt was never close with Wordsworth, their relationship was cordial for many years. As between Coleridge and Hazlitt, as well as Southey and Hazlitt, differences between Wordsworth and Hazlitt over politics were a major cause of the breakdown of their friendship.

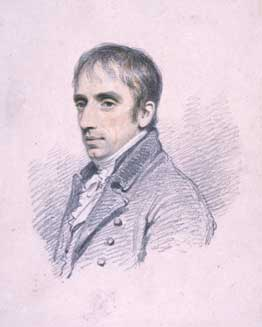
Sketch of William Wordsworth, c. 1807, by Henry Edridge

But there was another cause for the rupture. Hazlitt had reviewed Wordsworth's The Excursion in 1814, approvingly, but with serious reservations. Wordsworth's poetry was appreciated by few at that time. The Excursion was notoriously demeaned by the influential Francis Jeffrey in his Edinburgh Review criticism beginning with the words, "This will never do", while Hazlitt's account was later judged to have been the most penetrating of any written at the time. Still, Wordsworth was unable to tolerate less than unconditional acceptance of his poetry, and he resented Hazlitt's review as much as he did Jeffrey's. Their relations deteriorated further, and by 1815 they were bitter enemies.

Despite his grievous disappointment with a man he had once thought an ally in the cause of humanity, after nearly ten years of severe and sometimes excessive criticism of his former idol (some of it in reaction to Wordsworth's attempt to impugn his character), as with his other former friends of the period, in The Spirit of the Age Hazlitt attempts to reassess Wordsworth as fairly as he can. For all of Wordsworth's limitations, he is after all the best and most representative poetic voice of the period:

"Mr. Wordsworth's genius is a pure emanation of the Spirit of the Age." His poetry is revolutionary in that it is equalizing. Written more purely in the vernacular style than any earlier poetry, it values all humanity alike rather than taking an aristocratic viewpoint. It is something entirely new: Mr. Wordsworth "tries to compound a new system of poetry from [the] simplest elements of nature and of the human mind ... and has succeeded perhaps as well as anyone could."

Wordsworth's poetry conveys what is interesting in the commonest events and objects. It probes the feelings shared by all. It "disdains" the artificial, the unnatural, the ostentatious, the "cumbrous ornaments of style", the old conventions of verse composition. His subject is himself in nature: "He clothes the naked with beauty and grandeur from the stores of his own recollections". "His imagination lends 'a sense of joy to the bare trees and mountains bare, and grass in the green field'. ... No one has shown the same imagination in raising trifles into importance: no one has displayed the same pathos in treating of the simplest feelings of the heart."

"There is no image so insignificant that it has not in some mood or other found its way into his heart...." He has described the most seemingly insignificant objects of nature in such "a way and with an intensity of feeling that no one else had done before him, and has given a new view or aspect of nature. He is in this sense the most original poet now living...."

"Mr. Wordsworth's genius is a pure emanation of the Spirit of the Age."

— William Hazlitt, "Mr. Wordsworth", The Spirit of the Age

Hazlitt notes that, in psychological terms, the underlying basis for what is essential in Wordsworth's poetry is the principle of the association of ideas. "Every one is by habit and familiarity strongly attached to the place of his birth, or to objects that recal the most pleasing and eventful circumstances of his life. But to [Wordsworth], nature is a kind of home".

Wordsworth's poetry, especially when the Lyrical Ballads had been published 26 years earlier, was such a radical departure that scarcely anyone understood it. Even at the time Hazlitt was writing this essay, "The vulgar do not read [Wordsworth's poems], the learned, who see all things through books, do not understand them, the great despise, the fashionable may ridicule them: but the author has created himself an interest in the heart of the retired and lonely student of nature, which can never die." "It may be considered as a characteristic of our poet's writings," Hazlitt reflects, "that they either make no impression on the mind at all, seem mere nonsense-verses, or that they leave a mark behind them that never wears out. ... To one class of readers he appears sublime, to another (and we fear the largest) ridiculous."

Hazlitt then briefly comments on some of Wordsworth's more recent "philosophical production" which (for example, "Laodamia") he finds "classical and courtly ... polished in style without being gaudy, dignified in subject without affectation." As in the earlier sketches, Hazlitt finds links between his earlier and later subjects. If there are a few lines in Byron's poems that give him the heartfelt satisfaction that so many of Wordsworth's poems do, it is only when "he descends with Mr. Wordsworth to the common ground of a disinterested humanity" by "leaving aside his usual pomp and pretension."

Ten years earlier Hazlitt had reviewed what was then Wordsworth's longest and most ambitious published poem, The Excursion, and he briefly remarks on it here. Though he does not disdainfully dismiss it as Jeffrey had, he expresses serious reservations. It includes "delightful passages ... both of natural description and of inspired reflection [yet] it affects a system without having an intelligible clue to one." The Excursion suffers from what Hazlitt highlights as a major flaw in contemporary poetry in general: it tends toward excessive generalisation, "abstraction". Thus it ends up being both inadequate philosophy and poetry that has detached itself from the essence and variety of life.

As in his essays in this book on other subjects he had seen personally, Hazlitt includes a sketch of the poet's personal appearance and manner: "Mr. Wordsworth, in his person, is above the middle size, with marked features, and an air somewhat stately and Quixotic." He is especially effective at reading his own poetry. "No one who has seen him at these moments could go away with the impression that he was a man 'of no mark or likelihood.'"

Then Hazlitt comments on the nature of Wordsworth's taste in art and his interest in and judgements of artists and earlier poets. His tastes show the elevation of his style, but also the narrowness of his focus. Wordsworth's artistic sympathies are with Poussin and Rembrandt, showing an affinity for the same subjects. Like Rembrandt, he invests "the minute details of nature with an atmosphere of sentiment". Wordsworth has little sympathy with Shakespeare. Related to this, asserts Hazlitt, is the undramatic nature of Wordsworth's own poetry. This is the result of a character flaw, egotism. He regrets his own harsh criticism of a few years earlier, but still maintains that Wordsworth's egotism, narrowing the range of his interests, restricts his literary achievement. And yet, Hazlitt reflects, as is frequently the case with men of genius, an egotistic narrowness is often found together with an ability to do one thing supremely well.

Hazlitt concludes with a psychological analysis of the effect on Wordsworth's character of his disappointment with the poor reception of his poetry. But he ends on a note of optimism. Wordsworth has gained an increasing body of admirers "of late years". This will save him from "becoming the God of his own idolatry!"

The 20th-century critic Christopher Salvesen notes that Hazlitt's observation in The Spirit of the Age that Wordsworth's poetry is "synthetic" characterises it best, and Roy Park in an extensive study expresses the view that Hazlitt, as the poet's contemporary, most completely understood the essence of his poetry as a significant component of the "spirit of the age".

=== Sir James Mackintosh ===
Sir James Mackintosh (1765–1832), widely admired as one of the most learned men in Europe, was a Scottish lawyer, legislator, educator, philosopher, historian, scholar, and Member of Parliament from 1813 to 1830. Mackintosh came to Hazlitt's attention as early as 1791, when he published his Vindiciae Gallicae, a defence of the French Revolution, then unfolding. Written as a response to Edmund Burke's Reflections on the Revolution in France, it was warmly received by liberal thinkers of the time. However, later persuaded by Burke himself to renounce his earlier views about the Revolution, Mackintosh, in his 1799 lectures at Lincoln's Inn (published as A Discourse on the Study of the Law of Nature and Nations), attended by Hazlitt, reversed his position, subjecting reformers, particularly Godwin, to severe criticism, and dealing a blow to the liberal cause.

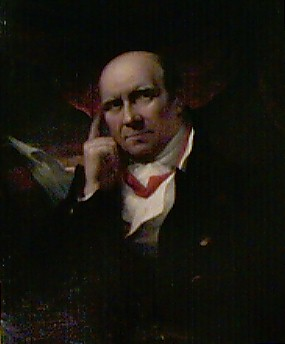
Sir James Mackintosh, portrait by John Jackson

Mackintosh thereafter became a bitter disappointment to Hazlitt. Looking back at the elder man's change of political sentiments, Hazlitt observed that the lecturer struck a harsh note if he felt it were a triumph to have exulted in the end of all hope for the "future improvement" of the human race; rather it should have been a matter for "lamentation". The two later again crossed paths, when Hazlitt, as a political reporter, attended Mackintosh's "maiden speech" in Parliament, in 1813, leading Hazlitt to think deeply about what constitutes an effective speech in a legislative body (Mackintosh's was presented as a counter-example in Hazlitt's 1820 essay on the subject). By this time, Mackintosh's return to the liberal camp had begun to take the edge off Hazlitt's bitterness, although he regretted that the nature of his talents kept Mackintosh from being an effective ally in Parliament.

Eleven years later, in his summing up of Mackintosh's place among his contemporaries, as elsewhere in The Spirit of the Age, Hazlitt attempts a fair reassessment. As he analyses the characteristics of Mackintosh as a public speaker, a conversationalist, and a scholarly writer, Hazlitt traces the progress of his life, noting his interactions with Edmund Burke over the French Revolution, his tenure as chief judge in India, and his final career as Member of Parliament.

"As a writer, a speaker, and a converser", he begins, Mackintosh is "one of the ablest and most accomplished men of the age", "a man of the world", and a "scholar" of impressive learning, "master of almost every known topic". "His Vindiciae Gallicae is a work of great labour, great ingenuity, great brilliancy, and great vigour." After he changed political sides for a time, Mackintosh then began to excel as an "intellectual gladiator". Of his qualifications in this regard, Hazlitt remarks, "Few subjects can be started, on which he is not qualified to appear to advantage as the gentleman and scholar. ... There is scarce an author he has not read; a period of history he is not conversant with; a celebrated name of which he has not a number of anecdotes to relate; an intricate question that he is not prepared to enter upon in a popular or scientific manner."

As he praises Mackintosh's impressive talents and intellect, however, Hazlitt also brings out his limitations. In demolishing his adversaries, including Godwin and the reformers in his famous lectures, Mackintosh "seemed to stand with his back to the drawers in a metaphysical dispensary, and to take out of them whatever ingredients suited his purpose. In this way he had an antidote for every error, an answer to every folly. The writings of Burke, Hume, Berkeley, Paley, Lord Bacon, Jeremy Taylor, Grotius, Puffendorf, Cicero, Aristotle, Tacitus, Livy, Sully, Machiavel, Guicciardini, Thuanus, lay open beside him, and he could instantly lay his hand upon the passage, and quote them chapter and verse to the clearing up of all difficulties, and the silencing of all oppugners." But there is a fatal flaw in all this impressive intellectual "juggling" (which, Tom Paulin notes, alludes to Hazlitt's earlier contrast between the deft but mechanical "Indian jugglers" and representatives of true genius): his performances were "philosophical centos", the thoughts of others simply stitched together. "They were profound, brilliant, new to his hearers; but the profundity, the brilliancy, the novelty were not his own." For all his impressive erudition, Mackintosh's writing and speaking are entirely unoriginal.

Sir James "strikes after the iron is cold."

— William Hazlitt, "Sir James Mackintosh", The Spirit of the Age

In his characteristic fashion, Hazlitt looks back to an earlier subject of these essays and compares Mackintosh with Coleridge. While the latter's genius often strays from reality, his imagination creates something new. Mackintosh, on the other hand, with a similarly impressive command of his subject matter, mechanically presents the thinking of others. There is no integration of his learning with his own thinking, no passion, nothing fused in the heat of imagination.

This preference for book learning and lack of intense involvement in the world around him were detrimental to Mackintosh's later career, even though he drifted back to a more liberal political stance. Hazlitt, who heard him speak in Parliament, observes that, just as his previous appointment as a judge in India was unsuited to a man who worked out his thought in terms of "school-exercises", Mackintosh's mind did not fit well the defender of political causes, which needed more passionate engagement. "Sir James is by education and habit and ... by the original turn of his mind, a college-man [and] in public speaking the logician takes place of the orator". Hazlitt recalls having heard him speak publicly in the House of Commons "seldom ... without pain for the event." The House is not the place to speak only the truth. Too much "interest" rather than pure "love of truth" enters into the decisions made in Parliament. And "the judgment of the House is not a balance to weigh scruples and reasons to the turn of a fraction. ... Sir James, in detailing the inexhaustible stores of his memory and reading, in unfolding the wide range of his theory and practice, in laying down the rules and the exceptions, in insisting upon the advantages and the objections with equal explicitness, would be sure to let something drop that a dexterous and watchful adversary would easily pick up and turn against him...."

Mackintosh, like Coleridge, shines as one of the great conversationalists in an age of "talkers, not of doers". Arguing cases in a Parliamentary setting, however, offers less immediate stimulation; in later years, Hazlitt claims, he has grown tired of all that weight of learning, unenlivened by anything new he might have used it for in his imagination. In speaking, as in his later writing, the "trim, pointed expression [and] ambitious ornaments ... ostentatious display and rapid volubility" of his earlier writing are gone, leaving only the productions of a mind that works with "given preconceptions." His ideas "do not flow naturally and gracefully from one another" and "have been laid down beforehand in a sort of formal division or frame-work of the understanding. ... There is no principle of fusion in the work; he strikes after the iron is cold, and there is a want of malleability in the style."

However much Hazlitt tries to be fair to Mackintosh, in the view of Tom Paulin, nearly two centuries later, subtle stylistic elements in his account of Mackintosh, even in the latter's triumphant 1799 lectures, undermine his own account of him as an impressively learned man, casting the scholarly jurist and Member of Parliament in a ridiculous light and showing him to be "a self-caricaturing absurdity".

=== Mr. Malthus ===
Thomas Robert Malthus (1766–1834) was an English clergyman, philosopher, economist, and educator whose Essay on the Principle of Population shocked the philosophers and social reformers of Europe in 1798, sparking two centuries of controversy about human population and its control. The first edition of Malthus's book claimed a mathematical foundation for the assertion that human population growth always far outstrips the growth of the means to support it, and population can be checked only by "vice and misery". As an open attack on schemes of Utopian reform advocated by Godwin and Condorcet, Malthus's book soon drew support from conservative politicians, who used it as an excuse to attempt to dismantle the Poor Laws, setting a trend that continued for centuries. In Hazlitt's day, at least one major political faction claimed that direct public assistance to alleviate poverty was ineffective, maintaining that businesses pursuing profit would automatically result in the best social conditions possible, allowing the inevitability of some attrition of the poor by disease and starvation. Liberal thinkers were outraged by these ideas, roundly condemning Malthus's book for its unfeeling blame of the poor for their own misery.

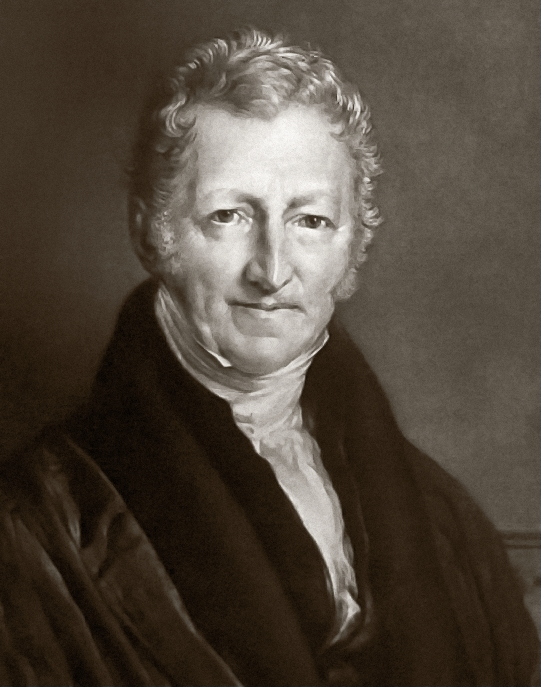
Thomas Robert Malthus

The attempt to use Malthus's ideas to change the Poor Laws came in 1807, and the controversy was stirred to a fever pitch. Hazlitt, one of a number of liberal critics of Malthus, contributed a series of letters to Cobbett's Political Register, which were later, with additional material, published as a pamphlet. As one of the first critics of Malthusian theory, Hazlitt was afterward noted to have influenced later Malthusian critics, though he was typically uncredited. Hazlitt, often openly bitter, pursued his own critical attacks in several publications over many years.

By the time he came to compose his account of Malthus for The Spirit of the Age, Hazlitt had acquired perspective and achieved a more balanced view of his subject. He notes at the outset that "Mr. Malthus ... [has] attained a scientific reputation in questions of moral and political philosophy." There is no mistaking what the man stands for: "In weighing his merits we come at once to the question of what he has done or failed to do." We know immediately that we are speaking of his "'Essay on Population' [and its] distinct leading proposition" which "has changed the aspect of political economy in a decided and material point of view": the proposition "that 'the population cannot go on perpetually increasing without pressing on the limits of the means of subsistence, and that a check of some kind or other must, sooner or later, be opposed to it.' This is the essence of the doctrine which Mr. Malthus has been the first to bring into general notice, and as we think, to establish beyond the fear of contradiction."

Hazlitt then lays out several things we should know if we are to accept this proposition. First, the idea was not at all original with Malthus but was conceived, even in many details, "in an obscure and almost forgotten work published about the middle of the last century, entitled Various Prospects of Mankind, Nature, and Providence, by a Scotch gentleman of the name of Wallace." Advanced almost as a joke, an extreme paradox, according to Hazlitt, "probably written to amuse an idle hour", the idea was taken up by Malthus in 1798, without, Hazlitt regrets, recognising its flaws, even absurdities.

The "geometrical" and "arithmetical" ratios constitute a fallacy, Hazlitt claims; for agricultural crops, like the human population, would grow geometrically if there were room to contain them. "A grain of corn, for example, will propagate and multiply itself much faster even than the human species." Hazlitt also notes another fallacy, the idea that "the desire to propagate the [human] species" is as fixed and immutable a law as hunger. That control of "the sexual passion" is possible by "moral restraint" is finally acknowledged by Malthus himself in later editions of his Essay, but inconsistently, so we do not know where he stands. Malthus is to be credited for showing that "population is not (as had been sometimes taken for granted) an abstract and unqualified good". Unfortunately, because Malthus never fully allowed that "moral restraint" could have much of an effect, and laid emphasis on the checks to population of "vice and misery", it led many to suppose that all increase of population is an evil, leading only to "a greater quantity of vice and misery".

This emphasis on vice and misery, and the alleged "geometric" nature of human population increase, was brought to bear by Malthus as an alarm raised against all Utopian schemes of human improvement, such as that in "Mr. Godwin's Enquiry concerning Political Justice." For, the greater the comfort introduced into the lives of the masses by the advance of "virtue, knowledge, and civilization", the more inexorable will be the action of the "principle of population", "the sooner will [civilisation] be overthrown again, and the more inevitable and fatal will be the catastrophe .... famine, distress, havoc, and dismay ... hatred, violence, war, and bloodshed will be the infallible consequence ...."

"Nothing", Hazlitt asserts, "could be more illogical"; for if, as Godwin and other reformers maintained, man is capable of being "enlightened", and "the general good is to obtain the highest mastery of individual interests, and reason of gross appetite and passions", then by that very fact it is absurd to suppose that men "will show themselves utterly blind to the consequences of their actions, utterly indifferent to their own well-being and that of all succeeding generations, whose fate is placed in their hands. This we conceive to be the boldest paralogism that was ever offered to the world, or palmed upon willing credulity."

The Malthusian theory "we conceive to be the boldest paralogism that was ever offered to the world, or palmed upon willing credulity."

— William Hazlitt, "Mr. Malthus", The Spirit of the Age

On the other hand, at those times when Malthus does allow for "moral restraint" as a population check, and allows that "its influence depends greatly on the state of laws and manners", then "Utopia stands where it did, a great way off indeed, but not turned topsy-turvy by our magician's wand!" So Malthus either raises an irresponsible alarm, or undercuts his own earlier argument.

Malthus might have created a much better book, suggests Hazlitt, "a great work on the principle of population". But he has weakened its effect, even precipitated dangerous consequences, by being biassed in favour of the affluent establishment and too willing to place upon the poor the burden of solving the entire problem. "It is not our author's wish to recommend any alterations in existing institutions. ... Mr. Malthus's 'gospel is preached to the poor.'" "Our author has ... counteracted many capital errors formerly prevailing as to the universal and indiscriminate encouragement of population under all circumstances ... but he has countenanced opposite errors ... and has left it to future philosophers to follow up the principle, that some check must be provided for the unrestrained progress of population, into a set of wiser and more humane consequences."

Hazlitt, as in many of these sketches anticipating modern journalism by mingling a personal sketch with his discussions of a contemporary's ideas, concludes by stepping back and acknowledging Malthus's "correct and elegant" style. His "tone of controversy [is] mild and gentlemanly; and the care with which he has brought his facts and documents together, deserves the highest praise."

Two centuries later, critic Roy Park noted the significance of Hazlitt's criticism: Hazlitt understood Malthus's weaknesses as those common to many philosophers of the age, a reliance on excessive "abstraction", along with the erroneous belief that, man being inherently selfish, only selfish individual action results in public good.

=== Mr. Gifford ===
William Gifford (1756–1826) was an English satirical poet, translator, literary critic, and editor, most notably of the influential periodical The Quarterly Review. Notorious for his staunchly conservative political and religious views and for his merciless attacks on writers of liberal political sympathies, Gifford was, as was widely known, hired by Tory government officials for the express purpose of vilifying the characters of authors deemed dangerous by the government. He was known and feared for the brutality of his attacks; even some other politically conservative writers frequently disapproved of the harshness of his methods. Gifford could be equally vicious as a satirical poet and was involved in numerous affrays with other writers, most notably the satirist "Peter Pindar", which led to a physical altercation. Later, Gifford, or critics under his supervision on the Quarterly Review, subjected the poets Shelley, Keats, and Leigh Hunt to merciless attacks, as well as prose writers, including Hazlitt on several occasions, beginning in 1817, when the Quarterly savaged his collection The Round Table.

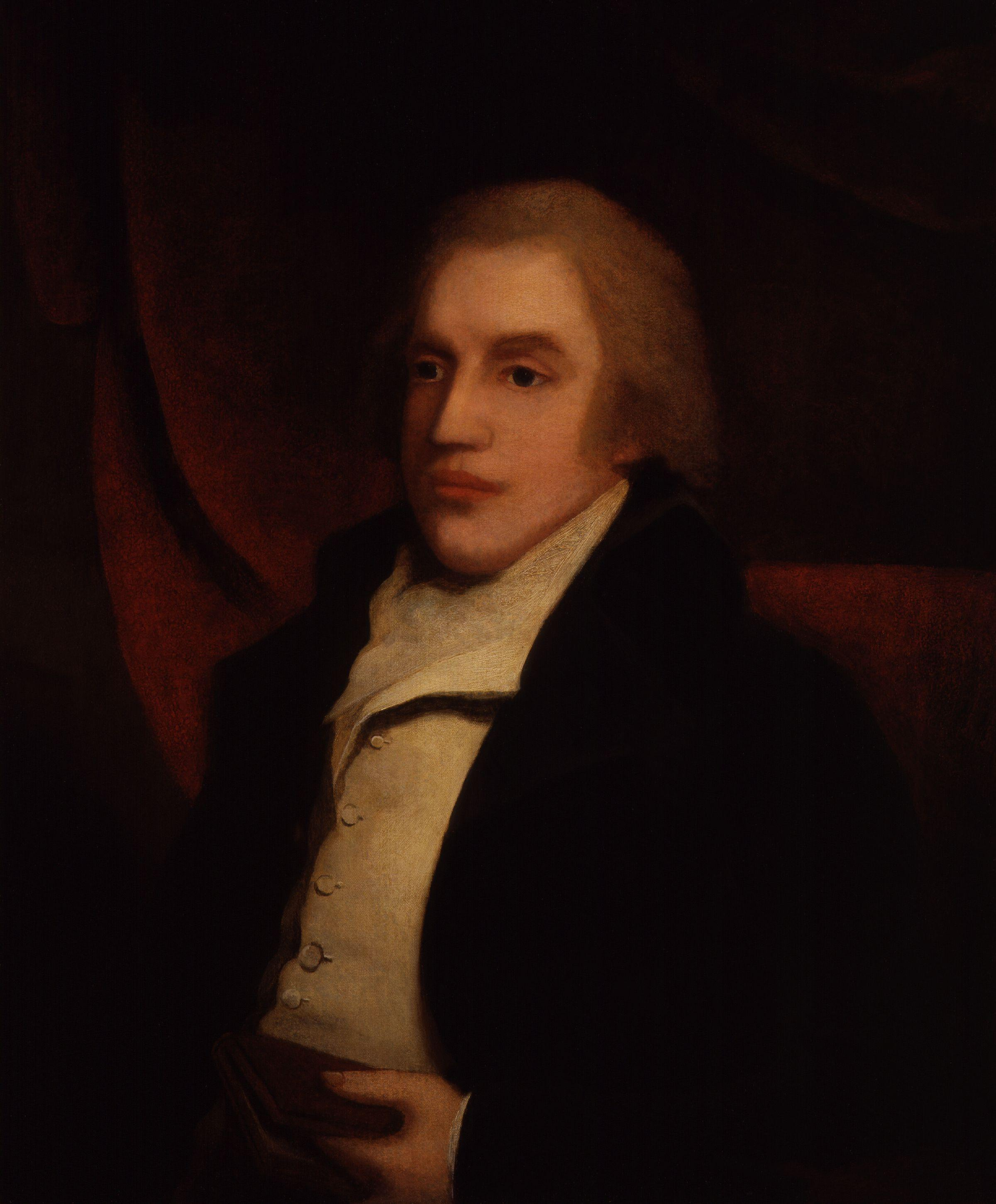
William Gifford, portrait by John Hoppner

The following year, after the second edition of Hazlitt's Characters of Shakespear's Plays had just been published, Gifford followed it with a review that resulted in the near drying-up of the sales of that book. This was followed in 1819 by an attack on Lectures on the English Poets and finally on Hazlitt's Political Essays.

Hazlitt had had enough, and, after having responded in vain in some short essays, had published at his own expense an 87-page pamphlet, A Letter to William Gifford, Esq., a ferocious attack on the character and methods of Gifford. Though the latter's reviews had already done irreparable damage to Hazlitt's career, Hazlitt's Letter was highly appreciated by many of kindred political sympathies, including Leigh Hunt, Byron's friend John Cam Hobhouse, and, most notably, the poet John Keats, who hailed it as "'written in a style of genius'".

By the time Hazlitt penned The Spirit of the Age five years later, he had cooled somewhat but still produced a portrait of Gifford that was laced throughout with satire. Hazlitt introduces his characterisation by summing up Gifford's background, position, and skills: "The low-bred, self-taught man, the pedant, and the dependant on the great contribute to form the Editor of the Quarterly Review. He is admirably qualified for this situation, which he has held for some years, by a happy combination of defects, natural and acquired ... ."

Hazlitt then elaborates on the nature of Gifford's skills as a critic, which amount to practising a very narrow, nitpicking form of criticism. "A person of mediocre literary attainments" himself, Gifford "stands over a contemporary [literary] performance with all the self-conceit and self-importance of a country schoolmaster, tries it by technical rules, affects not to understand the meaning, examines the hand-writing, the spelling, shrugs up his shoulders and chuckles over a slip of the pen. ... There is nothing liberal, nothing humane in this style of judging; it is altogether petty, captious, and literal." With all this, he is retrograde and "would go back to the standard of opinions, style, the faded ornaments, and insipid formalities that came into fashion about forty years ago." Moreover, Gifford having been "all his life ... a follower ... of wealth and power", his "political subserviency adds the last finishing to his ridiculous pedantry and vanity."

Mr. Gifford "is admirably qualified for th[e] situation [of editor of the Quarterly Review], which he has held for some years, by a happy combination of defects, natural and acquired ... ."

— William Hazlitt, "Mr. Gifford", The Spirit of the Age

Hazlitt goes on to note his belief that Gifford shows such narrowness in his reviews not simply because he is a political tool, but because he really cannot understand literary originality. "His slow, snail-paced, bed-rid habits of reasoning, cannot keep up with the whirling, eccentric motion, the rapid, perhaps extravagant combinations of modern literature. ... He inclines, by a natural and deliberate bias, to the traditional in laws and government; to the orthodox in religion; to the safe in opinion; to the trite in imagination; to the technical in style; to whatever implies a surrender of individual judgment into the hands of authority, and a subjection of individual feeling to mechanic rules."

These limitations, according to Hazlitt's psychological analysis, caused Gifford himself internal pain—"he is tetchy and impatient of contradiction; sore with wounded pride; angry at obvious faults, more angry at unforeseen beauties"—as well as leading him to inflict undeserved damage on the literary reputations of others of far superior talents. Hazlitt then brings up the case of the then deceased poet John Keats, whom Hazlitt had been among the first to recognise as "a true poet". He quotes extensively from Keats's "The Eve of St. Agnes", after which he offers for comparison some of Gifford's own poetry, "impoverished lines" written "in a low, mechanic vein", stating that the reader might easily judge which was superior, and lamenting that it was only for his low birth and his political associations that Keats with "his fine talents and wounded sensibilities" was "hooted out of the world" by Gifford or someone writing under his editorship.

Hazlitt then elaborates on the methods of Gifford's Quarterly Review, in which he and his "friends systematically explode every principle of liberty, laugh patriotism and public spirit to scorn, resent every pretence to integrity as a piece of singularity or insolence, and strike at the root of all free inquiry or discussion, by running down every writer as a vile scribbler and a bad member of society, who is not a hireling and a slave."

Hazlitt next steps back and sums up Gifford's other skills, as a satirist and as a textual editor of old dramatists. In the latter capacity, Hazlitt notes his one positive accomplishment. While as a satirist he is "violent ... abrupt [and] unmanly" (he had ridiculed a woman whose writing he disliked by pointing to her as hobbling on crutches), "as an editor of old authors, Mr. Gifford is entitled to considerable praise for the pains he has taken in revising the text, and for some improvements he has introduced into it." Even then, however, "he had better have spared the notes, in which, though he has detected the blunders of previous commentators, he has exposed his own narrowness of feeling more. Moreover, "as a critic, he has thrown no light on the character and spirit of his authors."

Hazlitt never mellowed in his attitude toward Gifford as he did toward his "apostate" former friends, but as a result he created a sketch that has come to be recognised as a "masterpiece of invective". Some have thought of Hazlitt as merely "getting even" in this essay. But, increasingly, his treatment of Gifford has come to be seen as understandable as it is accurate, in view of the savage nature of the politically motivated criticism of that age as well as the damage inflicted by Gifford and his cronies on Hazlitt and other liberal-minded literary figures. To the critic Walter Jackson Bate, who named the attack on Gifford in the Letter to William Gifford as "one of the half-dozen most sustained pieces of invective in English", the sketch of Gifford in The Spirit of the Age is "even more effective".

=== Mr. Jeffrey ===
Francis Jeffrey (1773–1850), later Lord Jeffrey, was a Scottish jurist, Whig politician, literary critic, and editor of and major contributor to the quarterly Edinburgh Review. Arising from the intellectual ferment in Edinburgh around the turn of the 19th century, the Edinburgh was the first periodical of its kind to engage in extensive analysis and broad commentary, in which a "review" was really "an extended article based on a book and frequently departing from it." It featured articles on literature, science, travel, and politics, among other topics.

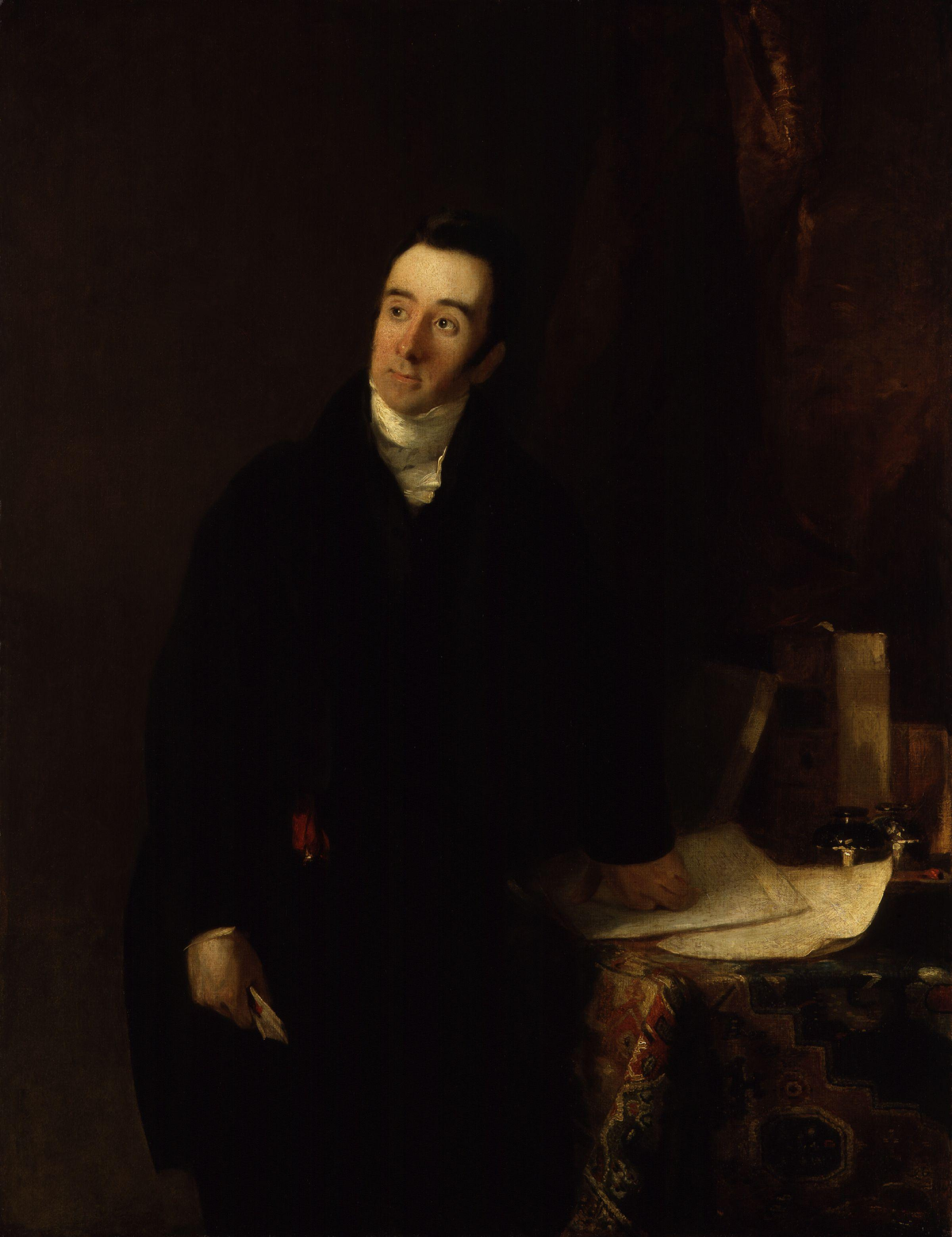
Francis Jeffrey, by Andrew Geddes

With a distinct Whig political bias, but also notable for encouraging fair, open discourse, and with a mission of educating the upper and increasingly literate middle classes, the Edinburgh Review was the most prestigious and influential periodical of its kind in Europe for more than two decades at the time Hazlitt wrote this sketch. Hazlitt himself had been a proud contributor since 1815, after Jeffrey had been guiding the Review for more than a dozen years.

Hazlitt's connection with Jeffrey was never close, but it played an important role in his career. In 1818, Jeffrey favourably reviewed Hazlitt's book Characters of Shakespear's Plays. During a visit to Scotland in 1822, Hazlitt met the man. Though the two were never personal friends, Jeffrey, over the years, provided financial assistance in the form of sizable advances for his contributions to the Review. Hazlitt, on his part, was always grateful for the support.

So closely identified was Jeffrey with the Edinburgh Review that Hazlitt begins this sketch without referring to him directly. Instead, he contrasts Jeffrey's periodical with the Quarterly Review, to the detriment of the latter, continuing a theme from the preceding sketch of Gifford. The Quarterly, notes Hazlitt, was founded in reaction to the Edinburgh and to the latter's "spirit ... of fair and free discussion" in which "every question was tried upon its own ostensible merits, and there was no foul play." Alarmed, Hazlitt asserts sarcastically, at the danger that this free spirit posed to the "Monarchy [and the] Hierarchy", the founders of the Quarterly set up a periodical that would "present [itself as] one foul blotch of servility, intolerance, falsehood, spite, and ill manners." On the other hand, "The Edinburgh Review", Hazlitt continues, "stands upon the ground of opinion; it asserts the supremacy of intellect; the pre-eminence it claims is from an acknowledged superiority of talent and information and literary attainment ...".

Hazlitt then assures his readers that he does "not implicitly bow to the political opinions, nor to the critical decisions of the Edinburgh Review ... but ... the talent with which they are supported, and ... the tone of manly explicitness in which they are delivered ... are eminently characteristic of the Spirit of the Age; as it is the express object of the Quarterly Review to discountenance and extinguish that spirit".

After praising the Edinburgh Review's general attempts at fairness, Hazlitt begins to note the flaws in its critical tone and method. For instance, in arguing a position, the Edinburgh allows too much to the opposite side "from an affectation of magnanimity and candour". At times it displays a "supercilious and cavalier" attitude, and has been "guilty of some capital oversights", most notably the failure to recognise the poetic value of Wordsworth and Coleridge's Lyrical Ballads. Also, in its attempts to be fair to Malthus, it went too far, and ended by "screen[ing] his errors." On the other hand, he concedes, it shows "little of the cant of morality" and none of "that of religion".

Finally, Hazlitt focuses on Jeffrey himself. As with his assessment of the Review, he begins with copious praise, then qualifies it as he goes along. Jeffrey is perfectly suited for his office of editor of this periodical, as a "person in advance of the age, and yet perfectly fitted both from knowledge and habits of mind to put a curb upon its rash and headlong spirit." He is an "acute... and discriminat[ing] ... logician" with "the habitual coolness and caution" of the lawyer. "He has great range of knowledge, an incessant activity of mind", with qualities enabling him to take "a comprehensive view of all circumstances of a case." "Mr. Jeffrey is neither a bigot nor an enthusiast. He is not the dupe of the prejudices of others, nor of his own." He is moreover an optimist and "argues well for the future hopes of mankind".

"The talent with which the [political opinions and critical decisions of the Edinburgh Review] are supported, and ... the tone of manly explicitness in which they are delivered ... are eminently characteristic of the Spirit of the Age".

— William Hazlitt, "Mr. Jeffrey", The Spirit of the Age

There are, Hazlitt notes, flaws in the man as in the periodical: "A too restless display of talent, a too undisguised statement of all that can be said for and against a question, is perhaps the great fault that is to be attributed to him." Jeffrey also courteously defers too much to his adversaries and neglects the opportunity for passionate support of human rights.

Hazlitt then considers Jeffrey's writing style: "He is a master of the foils. ... His strength consists in great range of knowledge, an equal familiarity with the principles and details of a subject, and in a glancing brilliancy and rapidity of style." Though other writers attempt to impress "with singularity of combination or tinsel ornaments", Jeffrey, without being a flowery or startlingly innovative writer, is impressive nonetheless with his "constant supply of ingenious solutions and pertinent examples", creating a "novel and sparkling effect".

From Jeffrey's writing style, Hazlitt transitions to the conversational abilities of the man in company (and it is only in "mixed company" that "Mr. Jeffrey shines"). Again, the portrait is mostly positive but with a few faults noted in passing. "Mr. Jeffrey's conversation is equally lively, various and instructive. ... Whether it be politics, or poetry, or science, or anecdote, or wit, or raillery, he takes up his cue without effort" and provides "an uninterrupted flow of cheerfulness and animal spirits" and enormous "fund of information". Yet, again, his fault is that it is all too much: "If he is ever tedious, it is from an excess of liveliness". In addition, he shows too much of the lawyer: "what is said by another, seems to make no impression on him; he is bound to dispute, to answer it, as if he was in Court". Jeffrey also shows a bit too much of what Hazlitt finds typical of the character of Scottish intellectuals; in Scotland, "they criticise every thing, analyse every thing, argue upon every thing, dogmatise upon every thing". This makes Jeffrey "too didactic, too pugnacious, too full of electric shocks, too much like a voltaic battery", and he "reposes too little on his own excellent good sense, his own love of ease, his cordial frankness of temper and unaffected candour."

Hazlitt concludes with warm praise, presenting Jeffrey as "a person that no one knows without esteeming ... He is a Scotchman without one particle of hypocrisy, of cant, of servility, or selfishness in his composition." Jeffrey is a man "of strict integrity ... is firm without violence, friendly without weakness—a critic and even-tempered, a casuist and an honest man—and amidst the toils of his profession and the distractions of the world, retains the gaiety, the unpretending carelessness and simplicity of youth." Again anticipating modern journalistic practise, Hazlitt records the immediate appearance of his subject, "in his person ... slight, with a countenance of much expression, and a voice of great flexibility and acuteness of tone."

Later critics have judged this sketch of Jeffrey as largely positive—Paulin emphasises that Hazlitt's characterisation of his personality as "electric" and constantly in motion generally signified high praise from Hazlitt, valuing life over mechanism—but also incorporating serious criticism. As Grayling emphasises, Jeffrey, like his Edinburgh Review, showed the fault of being "insufficiently robust in [his] party spirit, always ... straining too far to accommodate both sides".

=== Mr. Brougham—Sir F. Burdett ===
Hazlitt's sketch combining Henry Brougham and Sir Francis Burdett is the first of a number of mostly shorter essays concluding The Spirit of the Age, sometimes thought to mark a falling off in quality.

==== Mr. Brougham ====
Henry Brougham (1778–1868), later Lord Brougham and Vaux, was a lawyer, Member of Parliament, and cofounder of and major contributor to the Edinburgh Review. A lifelong reformer, he was involved in the abolition of slavery, support for the freedom of religion, and the spread of educational opportunities for the lower and middle classes, and assisted in effecting major legal reforms. Much for which he would later become famous was accomplished after Hazlitt's death, however, such as helping to pass into law the Great Reform Bill of 1832. Known for his learning, Brougham wrote voluminously on such topics as mathematics, economics, and the physical sciences, as well as politics. He became especially famous as a fiery and compelling orator after his 1820 speech in defence of Queen Caroline in the controversial divorce suit brought by her husband, King George IV.

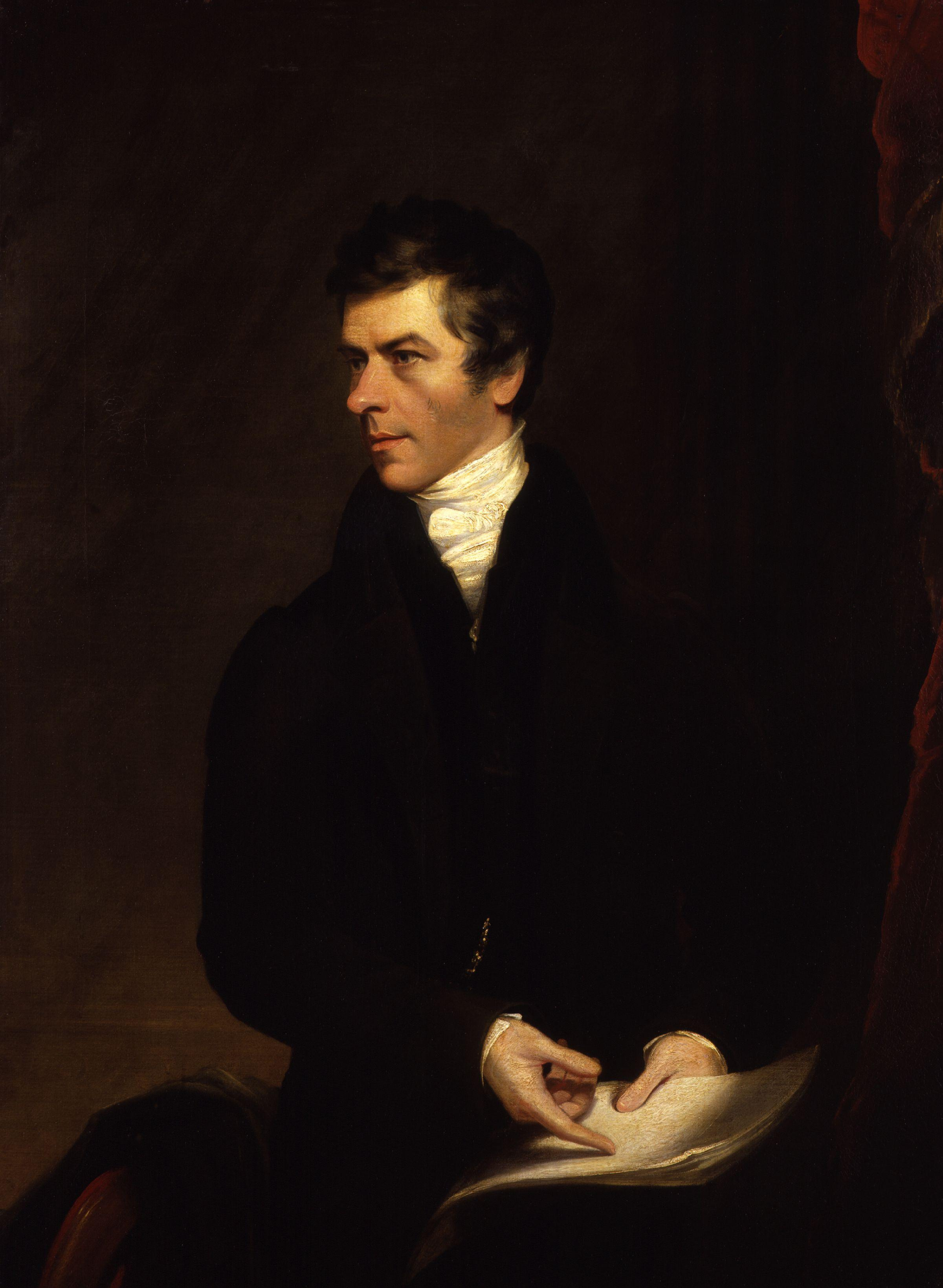
Henry Brougham, by James Lonsdale, c. 1820

Hazlitt knew Brougham chiefly as a Parliamentary speaker and contributor to the Edinburgh Review. In this brief account, he focuses on Brougham primarily as a representative of a class of speakers, typifying "Scotch eloquence", which Hazlitt contrasts with "Irish eloquence", a topic he had broached in the sketch of Mackintosh, and had explored at length in the article "On the Present State of Parliamentary Eloquence" in the October 1820 issue of The London Magazine. Irish eloquence is characterised by flights of fancy and verbal embellishments, carrying rhetorical exuberance to an extreme. Scottish eloquence is concerned only with facts, presented in dry, plodding monotonous fashion.

If the Irish orator riots in a studied neglect of his subject and a natural confusion of ideas, playing with words, ranging them into all sorts of combinations, because in the unlettered void or chaos of his mind there is no obstacle to their coalescing into any shapes they please, it must be confessed that the eloquence of the Scotch is encumbered with an excess of knowledge, that it cannot get on for a crowd of difficulties, that it struggles under a load of topics, that it is so environed in the forms of logic and rhetoric as to be equally precluded from originality or absurdity, from beauty or deformity ... .

Hazlitt presents both Mackintosh, whom he had already profiled, and Brougham as exemplifying the pinnacle of Scottish eloquence, which fails to attain great heights because of its "dry and rigid formality".

Thus, just as Mackintosh weights his arguments with "abstract principles" found in "old authors", Brougham, whom Hazlitt had witnessed in Parliamentary debate, loads his with innumerable facts, impossible for an impatient audience to follow. Brougham is "apprised of the exact state of our exports and imports ... our colonial policy, prison-discipline, the state of the Hulks, agricultural distress, commerce and manufactures, the Bullion question, the Catholic question, the Bourbons [and] the Inquisition ...". He brings in a huge number of "resources [and] variety and solidity of information", all of which makes him a "powerful and alarming" debater, but not an "effectual" one. Brougham's incessant outpouring of facts represents an "eloquence" that "is clever, knowing, imposing, masterly, an extraordinary display of clearness of head, of quickness and energy of thought, of application and industry; but it is not the eloquence of the imagination or the heart, and will never save a nation or an individual from perdition." In following only his own paths of reasoning he is often led to fall afoul of his political allies as well as his enemies, and he cannot restrain himself from revealing facts that would undermine rather than support an objective of his own party. "Absorbed in the pursuit of truth as an abstract inquiry, he is led away by the headstrong and overmastering activity of his own mind." Thus he often gives the advantage to his Parliamentary opponents.

"Absorbed in the pursuit of truth as an abstract inquiry, [Mr. Brougham] is led away by the headstrong and overmastering activity of his own mind."

— William Hazlitt, "Mr. Brougham—Sir F. Burdett", The Spirit of the Age

Hazlitt then narrows his focus, ironically exclaiming: "Mr. Brougham has one considerable advantage in debate: he is overcome by no false modesty, no deference to others. ... He has no reserve of discretion, no ... check upon himself." Here Hazlitt's judgment is confirmed by that of later historians and biographers of Brougham, who point out his egotism, unreliability, indiscretion, and irascibility.

Drawing on his personal experience, Hazlitt narrows his focus still further by observing that "Mr. Brougham speaks in a loud and unmitigated tone of voice, sometimes almost approaching to a scream. He is fluent, rapid, vehement, full of his subject, with evidently a great deal to say, and very regardless of the manner of saying it." The very scope of his knowledge and interests, however, limits his abilities as a lawyer, as he cannot be bothered with small issues, preferring to focus on the broad issues affecting the world.

Yet the scope of Brougham's interests and accomplishments is remarkable in itself. After addressing the public in an election he might on returning home complete an article, three or four of which would be published in a single number of the Edinburgh Review. He has, Hazlitt continues, mastered several languages, "is a capital mathematician", and, "among other means of strengthening and enlarging his views, has visited ... most of the courts, and turned his attention to most of the Constitutions of the continent." Despite Brougham's shortcomings, Hazlitt concludes by offering him as an example of "the versatility and strength of the human mind", showing how, "if we make a good use of our time", there is "room enough to crowd into" a single life "almost every art and science".

==== Sir F. Burdett ====
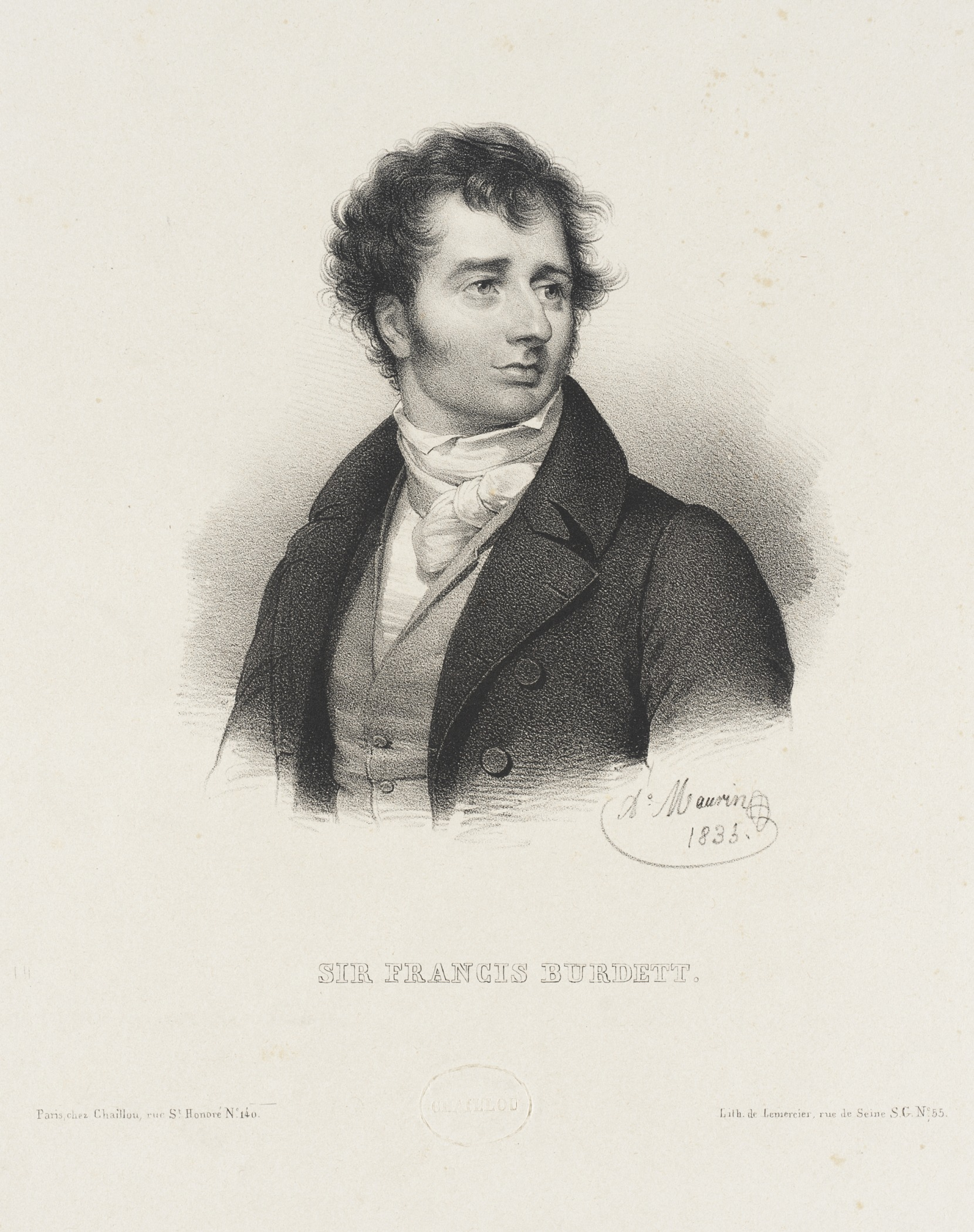
Sir Francis Burdett, portrait by Antoine Maurin, 1835

Presenting a marked contrast to Brougham, whom Hazlitt believed to have shown some of the deviousness of (in Hazlitt's formulation) the typical Scot, Hazlitt subjoins a brief sketch of Sir Francis Burdett. Burdett (1770–1844), scion of the Burdett family of Bramcote, was a member of parliament from 1797 until his death. A celebrated reformer and friend of the people, his connection to Hazlitt goes back to the gatherings of Horne Tooke, of whom Burdett had been a follower, and, in later years, to his representing Parliament as Member for Westminster, where Hazlitt was a householder from 1811 to 1819, and thus could vote for him. During this time Hazlitt, as a political reporter, had numerous opportunities to hear Burdett speak. Of all politicians, Burdett, whom he saw as representing a type of traditional Englishman, was the one with whom he was the most in sympathy, and whose principles (for which Burdett had been imprisoned in 1810) Hazlitt most shared.

Burdett is "a plain, unaffected, [and] unsophisticated English gentleman, ... one of the few remaining examples of the old English understanding and old English character." He is "a person of great reading and considerable information," which he refrains, however, from flaunting, "is one of the most pleasing speakers in the House, and is a prodigious favourite of the English people."

Sir Francis is "one of the few remaining examples of the old English understanding and old English character."

— William Hazlitt, "Mr. Brougham—Sir F. Burdett", The Spirit of the Age

Burdett's only flaw, according to Hazlitt, who gently chides him for the error, is that he believed that the source of liberty in modern times was to be found in the English constitution of old (Hazlitt ascribes liberty to "the growth of books and printing"). Otherwise, Hazlitt's praise of Burdett is unstinting. He finds Sir Francis a man of courage, honesty, and integrity. "There is no honest cause which he dares not avow: no oppressed individual that he is not forward to succour. He has the firmness of manhood with the unimpaired enthusiasm of youthful feeling about him."

=== Lord Eldon—Mr. Wilberforce ===
==== Lord Eldon ====
John Scott, Lord Eldon (1751–1838) was a jurist, Tory politician, and Lord Chancellor of Great Britain (1801–1806, 1807–1827) for most of Hazlitt's adult life. Eldon was respected for his legal subtlety and for having enacted major legal decisions; as an arch-conservative, however, he was also widely hated. As Attorney General (when still Sir John Scott), he had been the prosecutor in the famous 1794 Treason Trials, the defendants of which trial Hazlitt's brother John had been closely associated with. At a time when some of the most noted thinkers and literary men narrowly escaped conviction of High Treason, a time of rejoicing by supporters of free thought in Britain, Eldon had been on the wrong side, which Hazlitt, then an impressionable youth, never forgot. Eldon, as Lord Chancellor, later continued to help enforce the government's severe reaction to the civil unrest in the wake of the French Revolution and during the Napoleonic Wars, and was a notoriously persistent blocker of legal reforms as well as of the speedy resolution of lawsuits over which he presided.

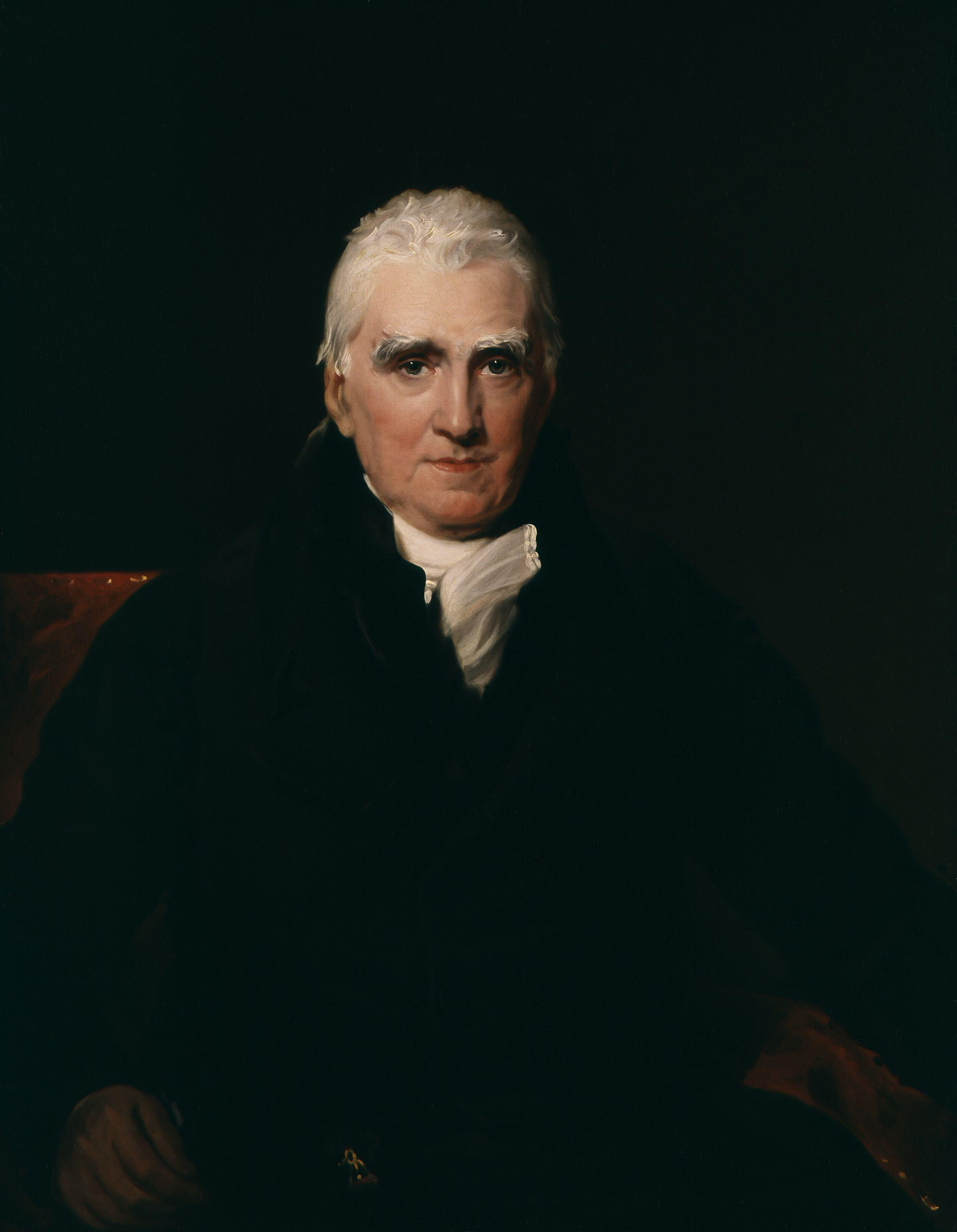
John Scott, 1st Earl of Eldon, portrait by Sir Thomas Lawrence, 1826

As both Attorney General and Lord Chancellor, Eldon consistently stood against every humanitarian principle that Hazlitt had so fervently supported. Nevertheless, paradoxically, in person, Lord Eldon, as Hazlitt found, just as consistently presented himself as a kindly, amiable, even humble soul. Hazlitt explains this apparent paradox with a psychological analysis of Eldon as a particular representative of a well-known character type, the "good-natured man".

What passes in the world for "good-nature", Hazlitt argues, "is often no better than indolent selfishness". The Lord Chancellor, as an example of a good-natured man, "would not hurt a fly ... has a fine oiliness in his disposition .... does not enter into the quarrels or enmities of others; bears their calamities with patience ... [and] listens to the din and clang of war, the earthquake and the hurricane of the political and moral world with the temper and the spirit of a philosopher ...". But this sort of good-natured person, exemplified by Eldon, is, if one scrutinises the case, good-natured out of selfishness: "tread on the toe of one of these amiable and imperturbable mortals, or let a lump of soot fall down the chimney and spoil their dinners, and see how they will bear it." "All their patience is confined to the accidents that befal others: all their good humour is to be resolved into giving themselves no concern about any thing but their own ease and self-indulgence. Their charity begins and ends at home." Their mode of self-focus cuts them off from human connection: their "being free from the common infirmities of temper is owing to their indifference to the common feelings of humanity".

Lord Eldon is "a thorough-bred Tory ... an out-and-outer ... There has been ... no existing abuse, so odious or so absurd, that he has not sanctioned ... ."

— William Hazlitt, "Lord Eldon—Mr. Wilberforce", The Spirit of the Age

As was frequently noted at the time, and Hazlitt reminds his readers, Lord Eldon delights in investigating the mazes of the law, and will prolong a case as necessary to decide fairly between participants in a legal matter; and the decision, however protracted the delay, might well be a fair one. But when the matter is one in which deciding against the continuance of royal or noble privilege would risk disapproval of the king or lord, however long Eldon's delay, the ruling is invariably in favour of established prerogative. In this, Hazlitt notes, Eldon has been consistent, "a thorough-bred Tory ... an out-and-outer". Hazlitt supports his contention by following it with a list of issue after issue in which, by backing royal and aristocratic privilege, Eldon has decided in favoor of maintaining abuses of individual rights. The Lord Chancellor does this not out of malice; his persistent failure to sympathise with the suffering of the common man is due to his blindness to it. This in turn is enabled by the persistent underlying support of royal favour, along with other motives: "The King's hand is velvet to the touch—the Woolsack is a seat of honour and profit!" Nor has he any particular understanding of the plight of the common man through "strong feeling [or] principle." And in this (Hazlitt here continues his psychological explanation) he follows a common human tendency: "Where remote and speculative objects do not excite a predominant interest and passion, gross and immediate ones are sure to carry the day, even in ingenuous and well-disposed minds."

Thus Lord Eldon presents himself to others as a pleasant person, "without one trace of pride, of spleen, or discontent in his whole demeanor". Yet having attained this state of poise and emotional equilibrium only with the underlying support of royalty, he also shrinks from the slightest difference with his royal patron. Thus "there has been no stretch of power attempted in his time that he has not seconded: no existing abuse, so odious or absurd, that he has not sanctioned ... . On all the great questions that have divided party opinion or agitated the public mind, the Chancellor has been found uniformly on the side of prerogative and power, and against every proposal for the advancement of freedom."

Here ended the original article, the fifth in the "Spirits of the Age" series in The New Monthly Magazine. For the book, Hazlitt added, as an interesting contrast, a sketch of William Wilberforce.

==== Mr. Wilberforce ====
William Wilberforce (1759–1833) was a prominent and long-serving Member of Parliament (1780–1825), best known as a lifelong Abolitionist and campaigner against the slave trade. As an Evangelical Christian, he was a central member of the Clapham Sect. While celebrated for his tireless campaigning against slavery, Wilberforce was also frequently criticised for his conservative political position, supporting repressive domestic policies in the wake of the French Revolution and the period of the Napoleonic Wars, including even what became known as the "Peterloo massacre", with the journalist William Cobbett going so far as to accuse Wilberforce of "hypocrisy".

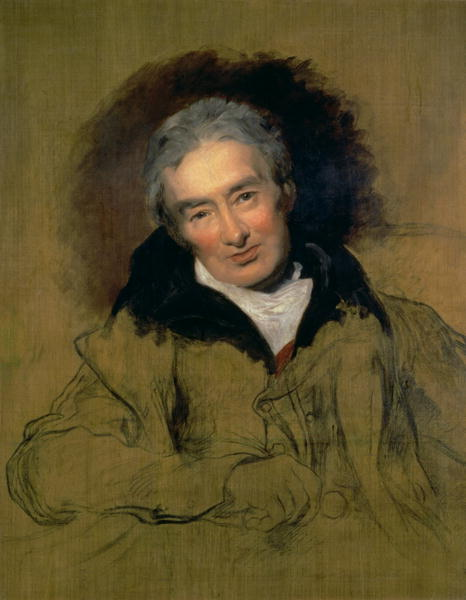
William Wilberforce, unfinished portrait by Sir Thomas Lawrence, 1828

As with Lord Eldon, Hazlitt takes a psychological approach in his assessment of Wilberforce, whom he had been watching and thinking about for years. However well-intentioned he might be, Wilberforce, according to Hazlitt, places himself in an impossible position. Differing with Cobbett, Hazlitt does not believe that Wilberforce is a true hypocrite. Rather, Wilberforce speaks "cant", that is, as Hazlitt explains, he vociferously expresses his religious beliefs while unwilling or unable to practise them consistently.

Wilberforce is a man "of many excellent and admirable qualifications": he is eloquent, "amiable, charitable, conscientious, pious, loyal, [and] humane". But he is also "tractable to power" and "accessible to popularity". These qualities, according to Hazlitt, are inherently contradictory and render Wilberforce ineffectual. "Loyalty, patriotism, friendship, humanity, are all virtues; but may they not sometimes clash?" He is too afraid of criticism and too in love with praise. "We can readily believe", Hazlitt explains, "that Mr. Wilberforce's first object and principle of action is to do what he thinks right: his next (and that we fear is of almost equal weight with the first) is to do what will be thought so by other people." The result, muses Hazlitt, is that he becomes accused, and understandably so, of "affectation, cant, hollow professions, trimming, fickleness, and effeminate imbecility."

Mr. Wilberforce "preaches vital Christianity to untutored savages; and tolerates its worst abuses in civilized states."

— William Hazlitt, "Lord Eldon—Mr. Wilberforce", The Spirit of the Age

So in love with praise, both popular and in the highest circles, is Wilberforce, observes Hazlitt, that he was even half inclined to give up his favourite cause, abolition of the slave trade, when William Pitt, the Prime Minister, was set to abandon it, and he sided with Pitt in approval of the repressive measures then imposed by the government in Britain and the government's later severe measures during the period of the Napoleonic Wars and afterward. "He has no mercy on those who claim a property in negro-slaves as so much live-stock on their estates ... but not a word has he to say, not a whisper does he breathe against the claim set up by the Despots of the Earth over their Continental subjects, but does every thing in his power to confirm and sanction it! He must give no offence. ... He preaches vital Christianity to untutored savages; and tolerates its worst abuses in civilized states." To "render signal services to mankind" requires greater moral strength than Wilberforce possesses: what is needed is "a severity, a sternness, a self-denial, and a painful sense of duty" that in Wilberforce's case vanish in exchange for a nod of approval from the king or the Prime Minister. Even in Wilberforce's acts of independence from his party's political standpoint, Hazlitt notes a subtle balancing of motives. In the words of Wilberforce biographer William Hague, who quotes Hazlitt's Spirit of the Age criticism, "Hazlitt considered that Wilberforce meant well, but would never risk becoming unpopular with the ruling establishment: 'He ... reaps the credit of independence without the obloquy ... He has all the air of the most perfect independence, and gains a character for impartiality and candour, when he is only striking a balance between the éclat of differing from a Minister on some vantage ground, and the risk or odium that may attend it.'"

In line with his practice of interweaving personal elements into these sketches, Hazlitt briefly summarises the character of Wilberforce's speeches in Parliament: "Mr. Wilberforce's style of speaking is not quite parliamentary, it is halfway between that and evangelical. As in all things, he must have things both ways: "He is altogether a double-entendre ... ".

Hazlitt concludes by exclaiming that to him, the real hero of the Abolitionist movement is not Wilberforce, but Thomas Clarkson, a man who persisted in the fight consistently without Wilberforce's "equivocation": with his "Herculean labours of body, and equally gigantic labors of mind", Clarkson was "the true Apostle of human Redemption on that occasion. ..."

=== Mr. Canning ===
George Canning (1770–1827) was an English politician, a long-time Member of Parliament, who also held several powerful and influential government offices, most notably that of British Foreign Secretary (1807–1809, 1822–1827). For a few months at the end of his life he was Prime Minister. In his early years he was also a satiric poet.

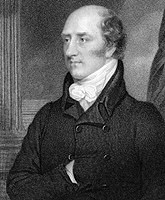
George Canning

Canning was acclaimed as a powerful orator and in later years for his achievements in international diplomacy. He was also criticised as overly ambitious, "slippery", and a "game player", and remained highly controversial throughout his political career. Hazlitt, at least from his days as a parliamentary reporter, had been following Canning for years, and, as with Brougham, had commented before about Canning's speechmaking. Canning's support for the Pitt government, which favoured a prolonged war with France, laying a heavy burden on the British populace, led Hazlitt to view Canning as self-centred, insensitive to the needs of the people, too ready to side with royal power, and ultimately dangerous.

"Mr. Canning was the cleverest boy at Eton", exclaims Hazlitt, opening his sketch with a focus on Canning's personal character. As a speaker, Canning developed in the artificial climate of schools, first at Eton College and then at Oxford University. Later he merely transplanted his manner of speaking to the equally artificial climate of Parliament. As a member of parliament, he was always too insulated from his constituents to be able to understand them.

Canning's oratory, Hazlitt maintains, is entirely artificial, his "reasoning a tissue of glittering sophistry ... his language a cento of florid commonplaces", elegantly constructed but trite and contrived. His speeches are "not the growth of truth, of nature, and feeling, but of state policy, of art, and practice." They are as unlike true eloquence as "artificial flowers" are unlike real ones, and are filled with such hollow and outworn phrases as "'the vessel of the state,' 'the torrent of popular fury,' 'the precipice of reform,' 'the thunderbolt of war,' 'the smile of peace,' etc." Canning adds to this the conventional modes of address used in parliament, such as "'The Honourable and Learned Gentleman,' and 'his Honourable and Gallant Friend'", which Hazlitt dubs "House-of-Commons jargon". These speeches are delivered in a brilliant, witty, and elegant manner suggesting extemporaneity, yet, as Hazlitt claims, there are clues to indicate that they are in fact carefully worked up in advance and learned by rote. And the speeches are used often to conceal unpleasant truths for political ends.

"Mr. Canning's success as an orator, and the space he occupies in the public mind, are strong indications of the Genius of the Age, in which words have obtained a mastery over things 'and to call evil good and good evil,' is thought the mark of a superior and happy spirit."

— William Hazlitt, "Mr. Canning", The Spirit of the Age

A master of sophistry, Canning can make a superficial case for any political action. Often it seems that his arguments follow his whims. "If all this", muses Hazlitt, "were fickleness, caprice, forgetfulness, accident, folly, it would be well ... we should stand a chance of sometimes being right, sometimes wrong." But the case is worse. Although Canning's arguments may seem arbitrary, so that sometimes some good may come of them, examination of their tendency shows a darker influence: that of support of "Legitimacy", warmongering for the restoration of Bourbon royalty on the European continent, with disastrous consequences. By unpredictable, seemingly arbitrary but carefully calculated movements, Canning "advances boldly to 'the deliverance of mankind'—into the hands of legitimate kings, but can do nothing to deliver them out of their power." To support his point, Hazlitt observes that when Napoleon invaded Spain, Canning urged the British to march to war to support the liberty of the Spanish people. Yet, after Napoleon's defeat, when the Bourbon King Ferdinand was restored to the Spanish throne but then broke all his promises to abide by a constitutional government and turned into a brutal oppressor, Canning's argument was that it would be "Quixotic" to interfere in Spain's affairs in any attempt to support the Spanish people.

Winding up this account of George Canning as sophist in the service of devious political ends, Hazlitt maintains that his career is a significant example of the "Genius of the Age". The age is one of words without substance, the substitution of words for things being an unfortunate sign of the spirit of the times. "In fine," observes Hazlitt, "Mr. Canning's success as an orator, and the space he occupies in the public mind, are strong indications of the Genius of the Age, in which words have obtained a mastery over things 'and to call evil good and good evil,' is thought the mark of a superior and happy spirit." It is not by chance that Canning, with his deftness with words, was also known as a satiric poet. But his satire, Hazlitt maintains, is of a shallow kind founded in dismissal of human feeling, in superficial contempt for the true poetry of life. "Any thing more light or worthless cannot well be imagined."

This sketch, originally an unsigned contribution to The Examiner of 11 July 1824, entitled "Character of Mr. Canning", appeared in book form only in the Paris edition of The Spirit of the Age.

=== Mr. Cobbett ===
William Cobbett (1763–1835) was an English journalist, farmer, social commentator and reformer, and a prolific author of books on gardening, household economy, religion, and other topics, including a popular grammar. His self-published Cobbett's Political Register (scornfully nicknamed "two-penny trash" by the political opposition, as it was affordable by labourers of modest means) was the most popular political journal of the day. Cobbett's sympathy for the working classes, disadvantaged by an economy undergoing wrenching upheavals, endeared him to them and greatly influenced popular opinion, as his unrelenting criticism of corruption and waste in the political establishment provoked government persecution, leading to imposition of fines, imprisonment, and self-imposed exile in the United States.

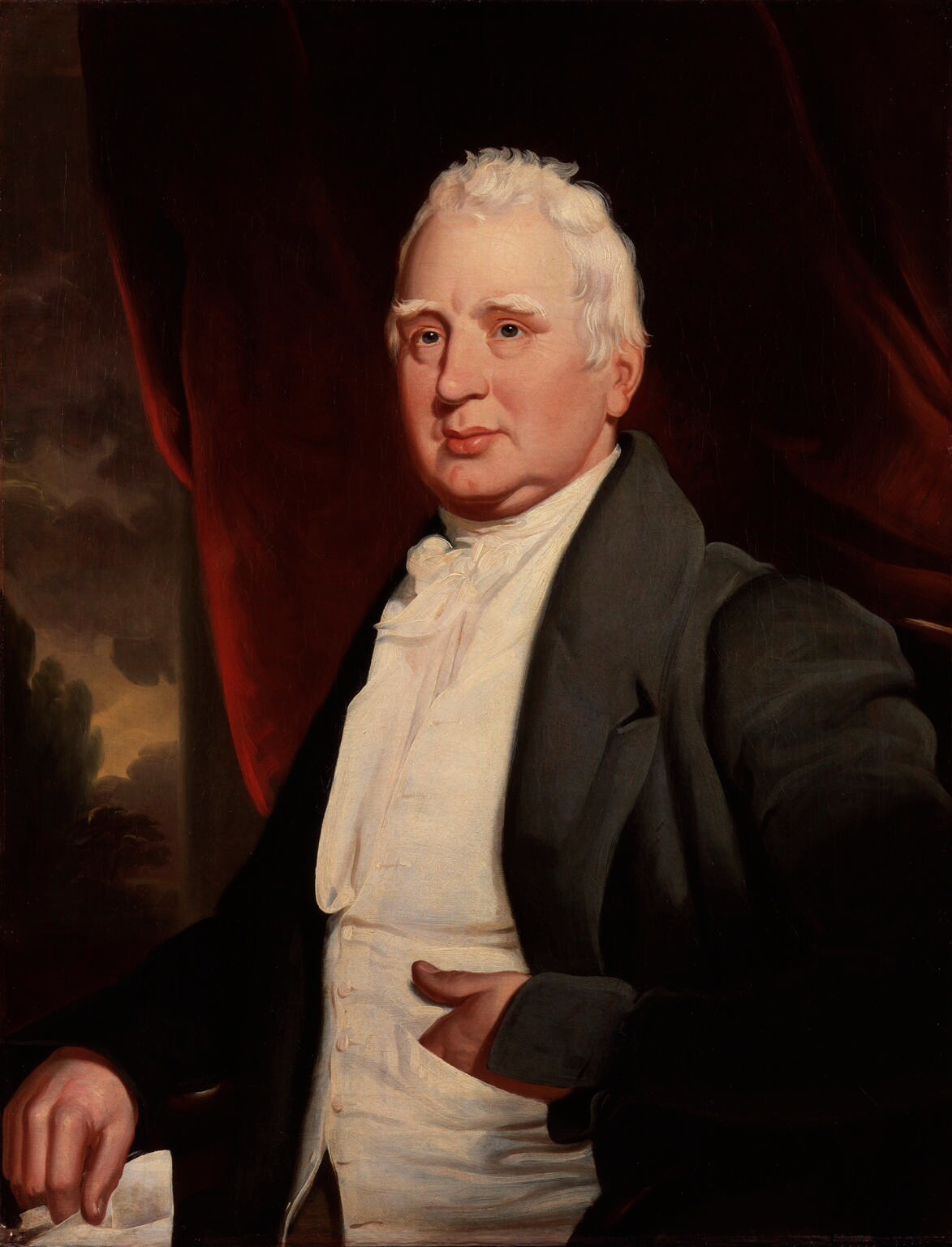
William Cobbett, portrait possibly by George Cooke, c. 1831

In agreement about the wrongheadedness of Thomas Malthus's economic theories, Hazlitt and Cobbett met in or around 1807 when the latter published a series of Hazlitt's essays criticising Malthus, in the form of pseudonymous letters, in the Political Register. Hazlitt continued to read Cobbett and observe his career, resulting in the profile "Character of Cobbett", published in 1821 in Table Talk. Later included in The Spirit of the Age, this essay thus became one of the earliest written of the character sketches to be included in the book.

Cobbett, asserts Hazlitt, is like the great prize-fighter Cribb—the most effective living political writer, as well as one of the best writers of any kind in the English language, so powerful in verbal combat that he amounts to a "fourth estate" in the politics of Great Britain. As with all first-rate writers, Cobbett's writing style is, Hazlitt reflects, difficult to describe. It is like that of Edmund Burke, which Hazlitt admired immensely, in only one way, namely, that he is sui generis, and his style is not quite like anyone else's. He is, Hazlitt grants, somewhat like Thomas Paine in his popular appeal and sympathy with the cause of the common man; but even then there are significant differences. Paine is a "sententious" and "poetical" writer; many of his lines are memorable and quotable. Cobbett's writing contains almost nothing suitable for quotation. Prosaic and down to earth, it produces its effects by the incessant accumulation of closely observed details.

Cobbett, Hazlitt observes, is so powerful a verbal combatant that one would think him unopposable, that "not only no individual, but no corrupt system could hold out against his powerful and repeated attacks." If he does not in practice succeed as well as one would expect, it is that he undermines his position by a number of self-defeating faults. These include a maddening inconsistency, as well as an unwillingess to compromise or collaborate with others. In fact, he antagonizes his would-be supporters along with his opponents: "with the same weapon" he uses against his enemies, he also "lays his friends low, and puts his own party hors de combat."

Mr. Cobbett "is like a young and lusty bridegroom that divorces a favourite speculation every morning, and marries a new one every night. He is not wedded to his notions, not he. He has not one Mrs. Cobbett among his opinions."

— William Hazlitt, "Mr. Cobbett", The Spirit of the Age

But Cobbett is not dishonest, servile, or mercenary. He believes in what he fights for, for the moment. "He is not a feed, time-serving, shuffling advocate ... but his understanding is the dupe and slave of his momentary, violent, and irritable humours." Employing another elaborate metaphor, Hazlitt observes that Cobbett "is like a young and lusty bridegroom that divorces a favourite speculation every morning, and marries a new one every night. He is not wedded to his notions, not he. He has not one Mrs. Cobbett among his opinions."

With his usual psychological focus, Hazlitt observes that Cobbett takes pleasure only in opposition. As soon as it seems that he has gained ground and the other party has backed off, he loses interest and retreats. He is interested in the truth, but not in holding his ground founded on "fixed principles" kept constantly in mind. "He abandons his opinions as he does his friends ... ." If he appears to be succeeding, he loses interest. "In fact, he cannot bear success of any kind, not even of his own views or party; and if any principle were likely to become popular, would turn round against it to shew his power in shouldering it on one side. In short, wherever power is, there is he against it. ... I do not think this is vanity or fickleness so much as a pugnacious dispostion, that must have an antagonist power to contend with, and only finds itself at ease in systematic opposition."

Cobbett "likes the cut and thrust, the falls, bruises, and dry blows of an argument ..." But then he loses all interest. "As to any good or useful results that may come of the amicable settling of it, any one is welcome to them for him. The amusement is over, when the matter is once fairly decided." Hazlitt provides as one notable example Cobbett's brief fondness for some ideas of Thomas Paine. Cobbett even brought Paine's bones back with him from the United States to England, planning to erect a monument. But then his enthusiasm dwindled, and he "ratted from his own project", and went off to fight other battles. Often, it takes only firm resistance or an attack in response to turn Cobbett around. Cobbett attacks only until he meets serious opposition, and then runs away, like a bullying schoolboy.

Pursuing his analysis, Hazlitt stops to consider a major cause of Cobbett's inconsistency: the "want of a regular education." Cobbett is almost entirely self-educated. Anyone with a conventional education would know enough of what has been thought before to be discouraged from believing that the kind of discoveries Cobbett made about corruption are anything new, would be less likely to be impressed by the originality of his own discoveries. He would know that there has been evil and corruption in the world before him, and be more likely to remain content with things as they are.

There is an advantage, however, in learning things for oneself. Cobbett, discovering the world anew, understands it better in its small details, and is better equipped to persuade others. Cobbett's observations are always fresh. "Whatever he finds out, is his own, and he only knows what he finds out. He is in the constant hurry and fever of gestation: his brain teems incessantly with some fresh project." If he is an egotist, his focusing on his own life is justified because he finds well-observed details in that life's events to provide the best illustrations of his thoughts.

Hazlitt in conclusion shows his subject in a favourable light, appending a footnote with his impression of Cobbett's appearance on the occasion when they met: "Mr. Cobbett speaks almost as well as he writes", although does not seem to care about how extreme some of his critical expressions might be. (Later commentators have noted how Cobbett was filled with the prejudices of the age.) "He seemed ... a very pleasant man—easy of access, affable, clear-headed, simple and mild in his manner, deliberate and unruffled in his speech ... ." To the eye, he gives the impression of one of the "gentlemen-farmers in the last century ... ." Hazlitt concludes that he "certainly did not think less favourably of him for seeing him."

A century and a half later, biographer A.C. Grayling applauded Hazlitt's preserving in this essay Cobbett's appearance, down to the details of "the flaps of [his] waistcoat pockets", while James Sambrook noted that Hazlitt "caught perfectly Cobbett's political temper, and the vitality which can thrive only on opposition", declaring that Hazlitt's account of Cobbett "remains far and away the best characterization of Cobbett as a man and writer ... ."

=== Mr. Campbell—Mr. Crabbe ===
==== Mr. Campbell ====
Thomas Campbell (1777–1844) was a Scottish poet and the editor of the New Monthly Magazine, where several of the essays that were later incorporated into The Spirit of the Age were first published. With the 1799 publication of his poem "The Pleasures of Hope", written in the formal language and rhymed couplets characteristic of an earlier period (though also with some traits of the emerging Romantic period), Campbell was catapulted into fame, becoming one of the most popular poets of the day, far more so than his Romantic contemporaries Wordsworth and Coleridge, whose Lyrical Ballads had been issued the previous year.

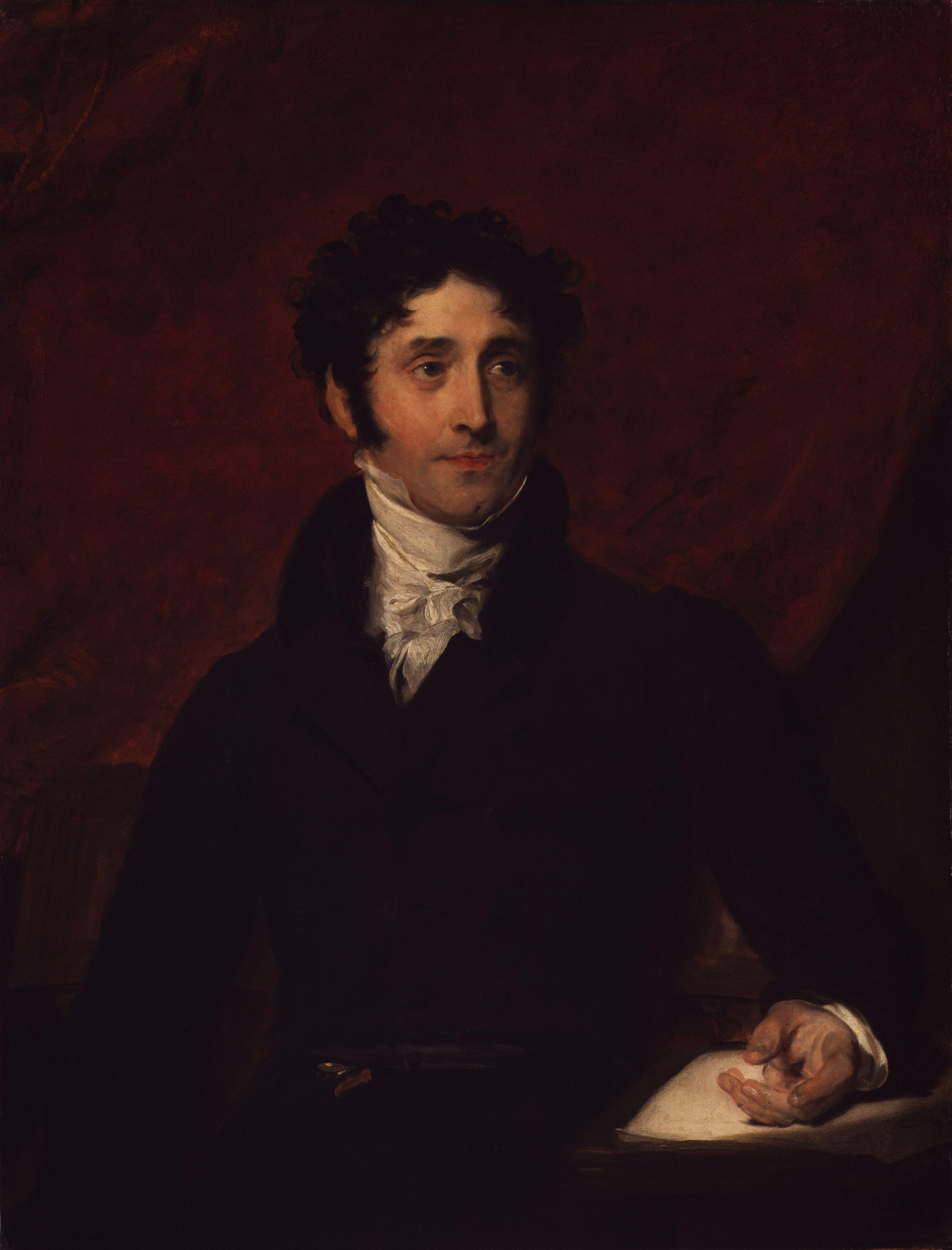
Portrait of Thomas Campbell by Thomas Lawrence, 1820

Despite the popular acclaim, "The Pleasures of Hope" did not gain critical favour, Hazlitt being one of the disapproving critics. In his 1818 Lectures on the English Poets, he heaped scorn on the poem's sacrificing "sense and keeping in the ideas" to a "jingle of words and epigrammatic turn of expression". Meanwhile, the unprolific Campbell, after some short lyric verses, had produced a longer narrative poem, Gertrude of Wyoming; Or, The Pennsylvanian Cottage (1809), a verse tale about European settlers in the Wyoming Valley of Pennsylvania, in the early days of the United States, depicted as an idyllic enclave before the community was destroyed in an attack by a hostile Indian tribe. Still embodying some of the conventions and the formality of Augustan poetry, it was also heavily sentimental like much literature of the later 18th century. But in its narration of a specific event based on historical fact (however loosely), its exotic setting, and its verse form, the Spenserian stanza, it belonged to the emerging Romantic era (though the Spenserian stanza dated back hundreds of years, many of Campbell's contemporaries were experimenting with such older verse forms).

In his 1818 Lectures, after severely censuring "The Pleasures of Hope", Hazlitt pauses to observe that Gertrude of Wyoming is better, with some bright spots. By the time he wrote the present essay in 1824, his overall attitude toward the earlier poem had softened, and he compares it favourably to the "too effeminate" Samuel Rogers' "The Pleasures of Memory" on the one hand, and the overly "extravagant" poetry of Lord Byron on the other. Campbell's place among poets is as "a high finisher in poetry ... who labours to lend every grace of execution to his subject, while he borrows his ardour and inspiration from it."

Mr. Campbell is "a high finisher in poetry ... who labours to lend every grace of execution to his subject, while he borrows his ardour and inspiration from it."

— William Hazlitt, "Mr. Campbell—Mr. Crabbe", The Spirit of the Age

The more recent Gertrude of Wyoming now receives yet greater approbation, containing, as Hazlitt had come to feel, "passages of so rare and ripe a beauty, that they challenge, as they exceed all praise." He proceeds to quote a lengthy selection of verse that he feels to be particularly beautiful, especially singling out the passage "All uncompanion'd else her heart had gone/Till now, in Gertrude's eyes, their ninth blue summer shone.'" In poetry like this, Hazlitt exclaims, Campbell "has succeeded in engrafting the wild and more expansive interest of the romantic school of poetry on classic elegance and precision."

The only qualification Hazlitt makes is in his noting that the achievement of this poem is "chiefly in sentiment and imagery":

The story moves slow, and is mechanically conducted, and rather resembles a Scotch canal carried over lengthened aqueducts and with a number of locks in it, than one of those rivers that sweep in their majestic course, broad and full, over Transatlantic plains and lose themselves in rolling gulfs, or thunder down lofty precipices.

Hazlitt then heaps praise on some of Campbell's shorter verse, much of which was about warfare, quoting in full his "Battle of Hohenlinden" about the 1800 battle of that name between the Austrians and Bavarians, and the French, and calling Campbell's short poem "of all modern compositions the most lyrical in spirit and in sound."

Later commentators on Campbell's poetry and Hazlitt's extravagant praise of it have noted this as one instance in The Spirit of the Age where Hazlitt's judgement failed him, his enthusiasm for Campbell's poetry having been carried too far. Recent critical assessment has rated Campbell's poetry, now mostly forgotten, far lower than Hazlitt here did.

==== Mr. Crabbe ====
George Crabbe (1754–1832), an English clergyman, surgeon, and amateur entomologist, was best known as a poet, later often considered an early practitioner of the style of literary "realism". Much older than most of his contemporary poets, Crabbe wrote in a style that harked back to the Augustan period, with his first widely acclaimed poem, The Village, dating to 1783. He produced most of his verse, however, in the early 1800s, during the Romantic period, when he was hailed by the respected critic Francis Jeffrey as a faithful portrayer of the daily life of the common people in their typical surroundings. Though somewhat controversial, his poetry won both critical and popular acclaim, and was praised by contemporary poets as notable as Sir Walter Scott and Lord Byron.

Hazlitt first reviewed Crabbe at length in his 1818 Lectures on the English Poets. This was followed by an 1821 article in The London Magazine (much of which he incorporated into the present sketch) in which he critically surveyed many of Crabbe's major works, including The Village and The Borough (1810). In 1824 he included lengthy extracts from, among other works, The Village, The Borough (including "Peter Grimes"), and the 1812 collection Tales in his anthology of Select British Poets.

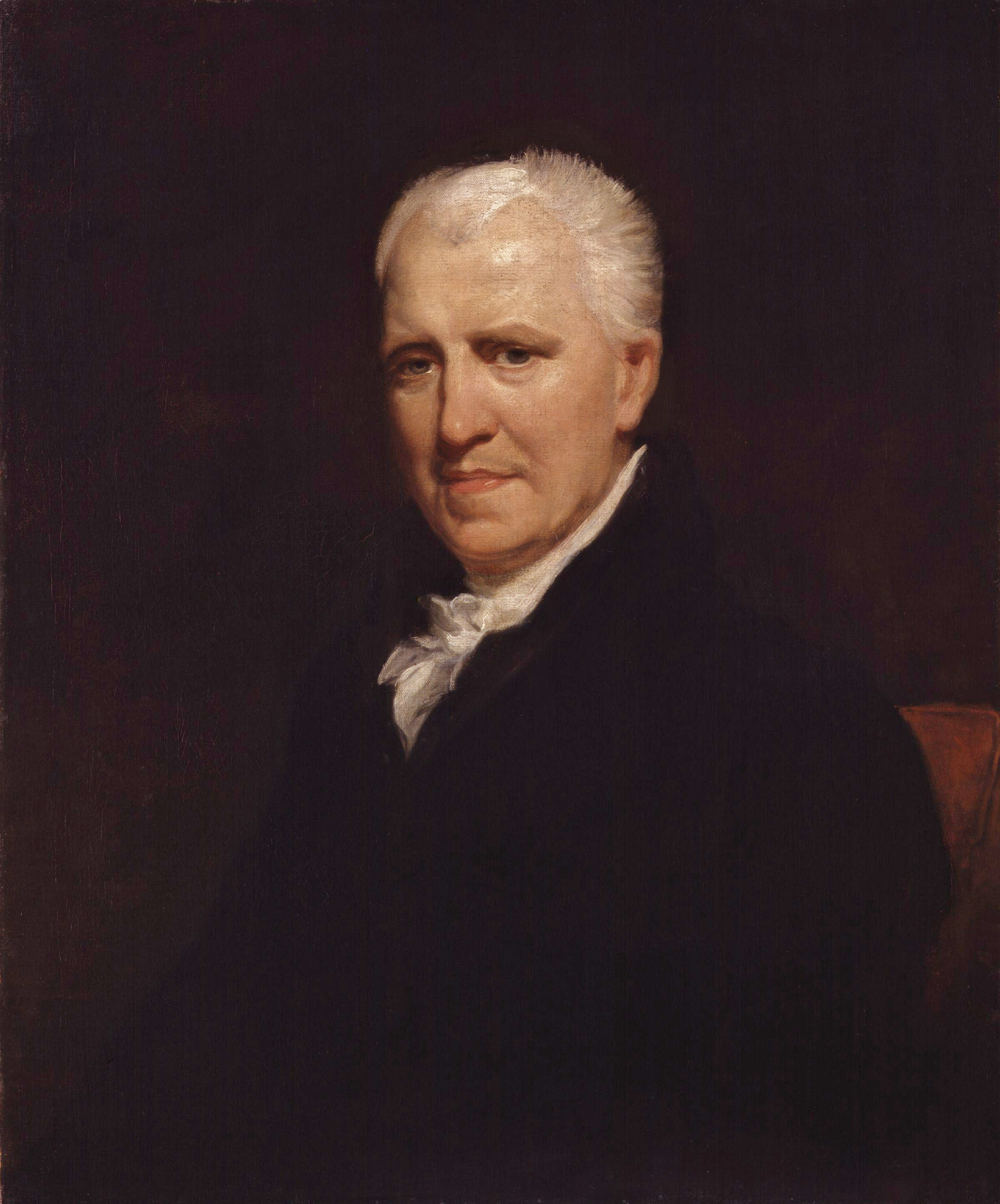
George Crabbe, c. 1818–1819, portrait by Henry William Pickersgill

In The Spirit of the Age he presents Crabbe as a radical contrast to Campbell, characterising at length the nature of Crabbe's poetry, attempting to account for its popularity, and adding some historical background.

Crabbe, notes Hazlitt, focuses on the lives of ordinary people in minutely described, most often dreary and oppressive, surroundings. He does not omit the meanest, least flattering aspects of human behaviour or the petty disappointments, the sickness and misery found in everyday life. "His song is one sad reality, one unraised, unvaried note of unavailing woe." There are none of the traditional poetic "flights of fancy", no imaginative transformation of the scene. He "dissects the most trivial objects" with "microscopic minuteness"; and he "deals in incessant matters of fact ... of the most familiar, the least animating, and the most unpleasant kind ... ."

Yet this is "nature". We are part of nature and deeply interested in its tiniest details, even if the focus is on the sordid and trivial. That "Mr. Crabbe is one of the most popular and admired of our living authors ... can be accounted for by ... the strong ties that bind us to the world about us ... ." We are captivated by Crabbe's poetry despite its focus, not on the "spirit of youth" but rather almost entirely on the "spirit of fear, despondency, and decay". Yet there is something compelling in its microscopic scrutiny of life, and "we read on!" "We can only explain this", writes Hazlitt, "by saying ... that Mr. Crabbe gives us one part of nature, the mean, the little, the disgusting, the distressing; that he does this thoroughly and like a master, and we forgive all the rest!"

Though often oppressive, Crabbe's poetry had remarkable popular appeal, which Hazlitt attempts to explain by isolating two causes: the reading public was tiring of the formal, conventional, empty phrasing of most poetry of the day; and simultaneously there had been developing a public taste for painting. Something in Crabbe's The Village had caught the interest of the respected critic Dr. Johnson, but it was a painter, the famous Sir Joshua Reynolds, who in 1783 had brought it to his attention. The time was ripe for this kind of verse: Crabbe essentially paints in words, and his word paintings embody the attention to detail typical of Dutch and Flemish painters of the 17th century, a sharp and welcome relief from the vapid, conventional phraseology of much Augustan poetry. "Painting is essentially an imitative art; it cannot subsist for a moment on empty generalities ... . Mr. Crabbe ... paints in words, instead of colours."

"Mr. Crabbe gives us one part of nature, the mean, the little, the disgusting, the distressing; ... he does this thoroughly and like a master, and we forgive all the rest!"

— William Hazlitt, "Mr. Campbell—Mr. Crabbe", The Spirit of the Age

Unfortunately, the artificial and laboured character of his versification has a detrimental effect on the poetry, and Hazlitt suggests that Crabbe might have written his tales in plain prose: "Mr. Crabbe ... is for the most part a poet, only because he writes in lines of ten syllables."

Crabbe's shift in approach was not necessarily a bad thing. The flaw in Crabbe's poetry, however, is, according to Hazlitt, that, with all its detail, it misses much of life, emphasising much too heavily the oppressive and the squalid, along with the mean and malicious tendencies of human nature. Hazlitt points to ways in which all this might be incorporated into literature and yet made uplifting, as in tragedy. With Crabbe, we get mostly the oppressive. In this, Hazlitt finds Crabbe unimaginative. It is not that he doesn't indulge in flights of fancy, but rather that he doesn't use his imagination to see, and help the reader see, into the minds and hearts of the poor, to feel what they feel in their situation. Instead, scrutinizing in detail the squalor of their surroundings, he attributes to them feelings he would have in their place.

Crabbe's persistent depressed attitude might be, Hazlitt muses in one of his psychological analyses, because Crabbe himself was a dissatisfied man, a country parson set down in a remote location for life, "and he takes his revenge by imprisoning the reader's imagination in luckless verse. Shut out from social converse, from learned colleges and halls, where he passed his youth, he has no cordial fellow feeling with the unlettered manners of the Village or the Borough; and he describes his neighbors as more uncomfortable and discontented than himself."

Hazlitt concludes with a lengthy quotation from the "Peter Grimes" letter in The Borough, characterising it as "an exact fac-simile of some of the most unlovely parts of the creation." He allows, however, that Crabbe's poetry in Tales is more readable than that in his earlier collection Poems. Still oppressive, this later poetry contains "highly finished, striking, and original portraits", with acute psychological insight, "an intimate knowledge of the small and intricate folds of the human heart." There is enough that is striking, even "profound", so that if they do not affect us as "entertaining" or "delightful", they compel us to read on, even if once you lay the poems down "you never wish to take them up again". Thus "they will remain, 'as a thorn in the side of poetry,' perhaps for a century to come!"

Hazlitt's sketch of Crabbe has drawn much more serious interest by recent critics than the companion sketch on Campbell. Tim Fulford assents to Hazlitt's observation that Crabbe viewed his poor villagers from a distance ("as an overseer of the poor"; the words are from his lectures on poetry but the idea was brought forward into The Spirit of the Age), rather than showing the reader what they feel about their situation.

Roy Park notes with approval Hazlitt's observations on the imbalance in what Crabbe shows the reader in his verse narratives, his overemphasis of the pictorial, as well as of the dark side of the human condition. And David Bromwich notes the importance of Hazlitt's discussion of the relationship of a fictional world to the world it draws upon, including the extent to which a writer of fiction is said to create a world, in which Hazlitt here comes close to "a full-scale debate on the question".

=== Mr. T. Moore—Mr. Leigh Hunt ===
==== Mr. T. Moore ====
Thomas Moore (1779–1852) was an Irish-born English poet, songwriter, satirist, and writer of miscellaneous prose. He skyrocketed to fame in 1817 with his exotic poem Lalla Rookh, and his controversial biography of Byron was an immediate success. Moore's most lasting popularity came with his series of sentimental, patriotic, but well-crafted and sometimes inspired Irish Melodies (1808–34). For these, Moore set original lyrics to traditional Irish tunes, and he frequently publicly performed them himself. Some, like "The Last Rose of Summer", remained popular well into the twentieth century.

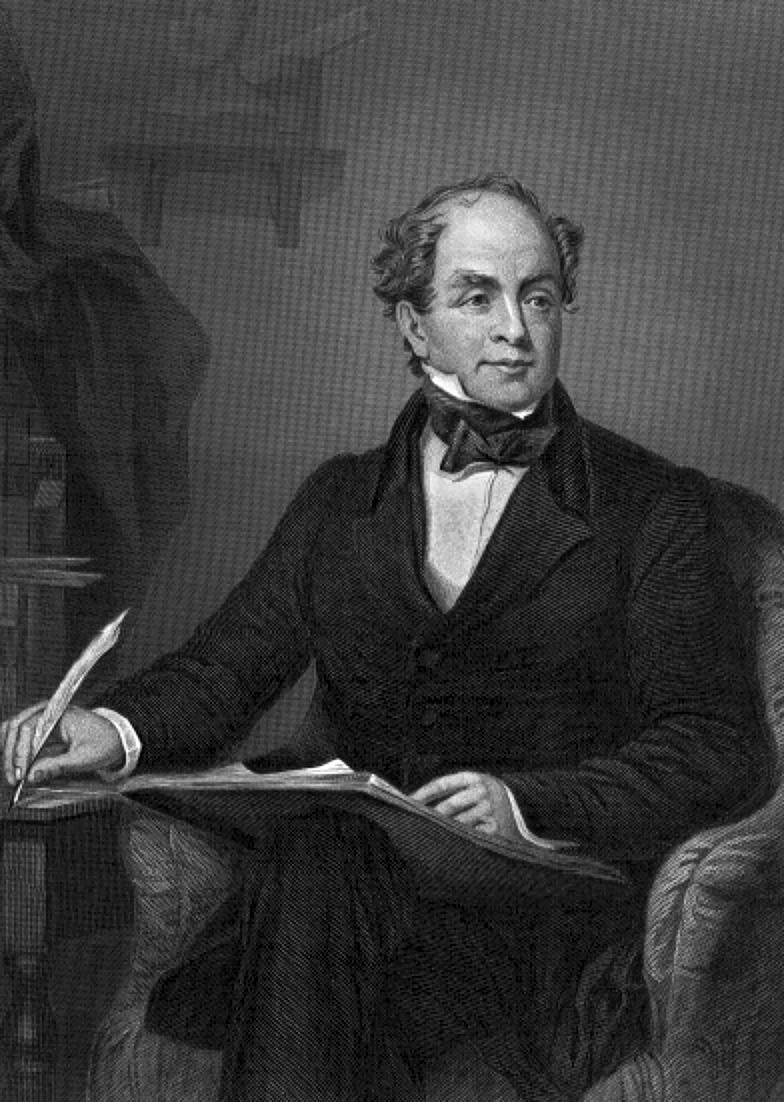
Thomas Moore, by unknown artist

Hazlitt devoted serious coverage to Moore's poetry in one of his January 1818 Lectures on the English Poets, an earlier lecture in which series Moore himself had attended. His opinions of some of Moore's major verse productions, particularly the highly touted Lalla Rookh, a part-prose, part-verse "Oriental Romance", were not altogether complimentary. Soon afterwards, Hazlitt published an anonymous review, mostly favourable, of Moore's sometimes lighthearted but often politically barbed satire, The Fudge Family in Paris (itself published pseudonymously, as "edited" by "Thomas Brown, the younger"), in the 25 April 1818 issue of The Yellow Dwarf, and Moore in turn presented Hazlitt with an inscribed copy of that short epistolary novel in verse.

Hazlitt and Moore shared many left-wing political views; however, Hazlitt's critical stance against much of Moore's poetry and some of his actions later distanced the two men. One of these actions was Moore's discouraging his friend Byron from joining Hazlitt and Leigh Hunt in Hunt's new left-leaning political journal, The Liberal. Also Moore harshly criticised the personal life of one of Hazlitt's favourite writers, Rousseau, and simultaneously disparaged Rousseau's literary accomplishments, later angrily defended by Hazlitt against Moore. By the time Hazlitt came to size up Moore in his sketch in The Spirit of the Age, there was no hope of any real reconciliation.

Hazlitt begins his sketch of Moore in The Spirit of the Age by focusing on Lalla Rookh, which had appeared in 1817, at the height of the craze for poetry about exotic locales, particularly the Near East. Although Moore had no first-hand knowledge of that region of the world, and the poem achieves its "local colour" by weaving in bits and pieces of knowledge acquired from second-hand sources, it achieved a sparkle and lush effect that had immense popular appeal, and it was an instant success. As Hazlitt notes at the outset, "Mr. Moore's poetry ... is like a shower of beauty; a dance of images; a stream of music; or like the spray of the water-fall, tinged by the morning beam with rosy light. The characteristic distinction of our author's style is this continuous and incessant flow of voluptuous thoughts and shining allusions."

"It has been too much [Mr. Moore's] object to pander to the artificial taste of the age. ... Now all must be raised to the same tantalising and preposterous level. ... The craving of the public mind after novelty and effect ... must be pampered with fine words at every step—we must be tickled with sound, startled with show, and relieved by the importunate, uninterrupted display of fancy and verbal tinsel as much as possible from the fatigue of thought or shock of feeling."

— William Hazlitt, "Mr. T. Moore—Mr. Leigh Hunt", The Spirit of the Age

However delightful this may sometimes be, Hazlitt observes, Moore carries all to excess, to satisfy popular taste: "It has been too much our author's object to pander to the artificial taste of the age. ... Now all must be raised to the same tantalising and preposterous level. ... The craving of the public mind after novelty and effect ... must be pampered with fine words at every step—we must be tickled with sound, startled with show, and relieved by the importunate, uninterrupted display of fancy and verbal tinsel as much as possible from the fatigue of thought or shock of feeling." Individual verses may be appealing, but Moore fails to construct a satisfactory whole: "He can write verses, not a poem. There is no principle of massing or of continuity in his productions—neither height nor breadth nor depth of capacity. There is no truth of representation, no strong internal feeling [but merely] flippant forwardness and unmeaning sentimentality."

Neither does Moore's superficial sentimentality, especially in light of the tribulations of Ireland at the time, go well with Irish patriotism in Moore's Irish Melodies, Hazlitt adds, and he gibes: "If these national airs do indeed express the soul of impassioned feeling in his countrymen, the case of Ireland is hopeless."

Moore's satire, on the other hand, claims Hazlitt, shows Moore's talent at its best. In such works as the Twopenny Post-bag and, to a lesser degree, The Fudge Family in Paris, Moore's "light, agreeable, polished style pierces through the body of the court ... weighs the vanity of fashion in tremulous scales, mimics the grimace of affectation and folly, shows up the littleness of the great, and spears a phalanx of statesmen with its glittering point as with a diamond brooch."

Hazlitt concludes with a note—in line with his practise in The Spirit of the Age—on Moore's personal character, observing that "Mr. Moore is in private life an amiable and estimable man." Hazlitt's resentment, however, of Moore's dissuading Byron from participating in Hunt's periodical, to which Hazlitt had also contributed, increasingly colours his account as he winds down to a conclusion. Moore, Hazlitt asserts, wants to have things both ways, identifying with the people and with liberal causes, yet at the same time moving in aristocratic circles above the masses. While he stands fast by his patriotic beliefs and "vindicates his own dignity" (thereby preventing his ever being accepted in royal circles), Moore "has been ... accustomed to the society of Whig Lords, and ... enchanted with the smile of beauty and fashion ... ". "There is", Hazlitt claims, "a little servility and pandering to aristocratic pride" in Moore's actions, and Moore is too ready to "advise a Noble Peer to get as fast as possible out of a certain publication ... ". "Does Mr. Moore," Hazlitt disappointedly wonders aloud, "insist on the double claim of birth and genius as a title to respectability in all advocates of the popular side—but himself?"

Although most of Moore's accomplishments faded from the public eye (his satire having been too topical to last, however stunning it was in its day), in a reassessment of Moore a century and a half later, critic and biographer Miriam Allen deFord singled out Hazlitt's treatment of Moore in this sketch to have been particularly level-headed and on point, stating, "The most acute critic of Moore in his own time was William Hazlitt ...".

==== Mr. Leigh Hunt ====
Leigh Hunt (1784–1859) was an English man of letters—a poet, political commentator, drama critic, literary critic, translator, and essayist. The centre of a literary circle including the poets Byron, Shelley, and Keats, and the essayists Charles Lamb and Hazlitt himself, he exerted an influence on and was an avid promoter of all of them. Hunt began to gain notice in 1808, when, as editor of the radical periodical The Examiner, and a valiant advocate of liberty, free speech, and political reform, he attracted a wide audience; he gained even more attention in 1813 when his outspoken criticism of the Prince Regent landed him in prison. In 1816, Hunt published his innovative but controversial narrative poem The Story of Rimini. It drew many enthusiastic admirers, but its theme of forbidden love provided Hunt's political foes with an instrument to chastise him, and from then on Hunt's reputation was sharply split along political lines.

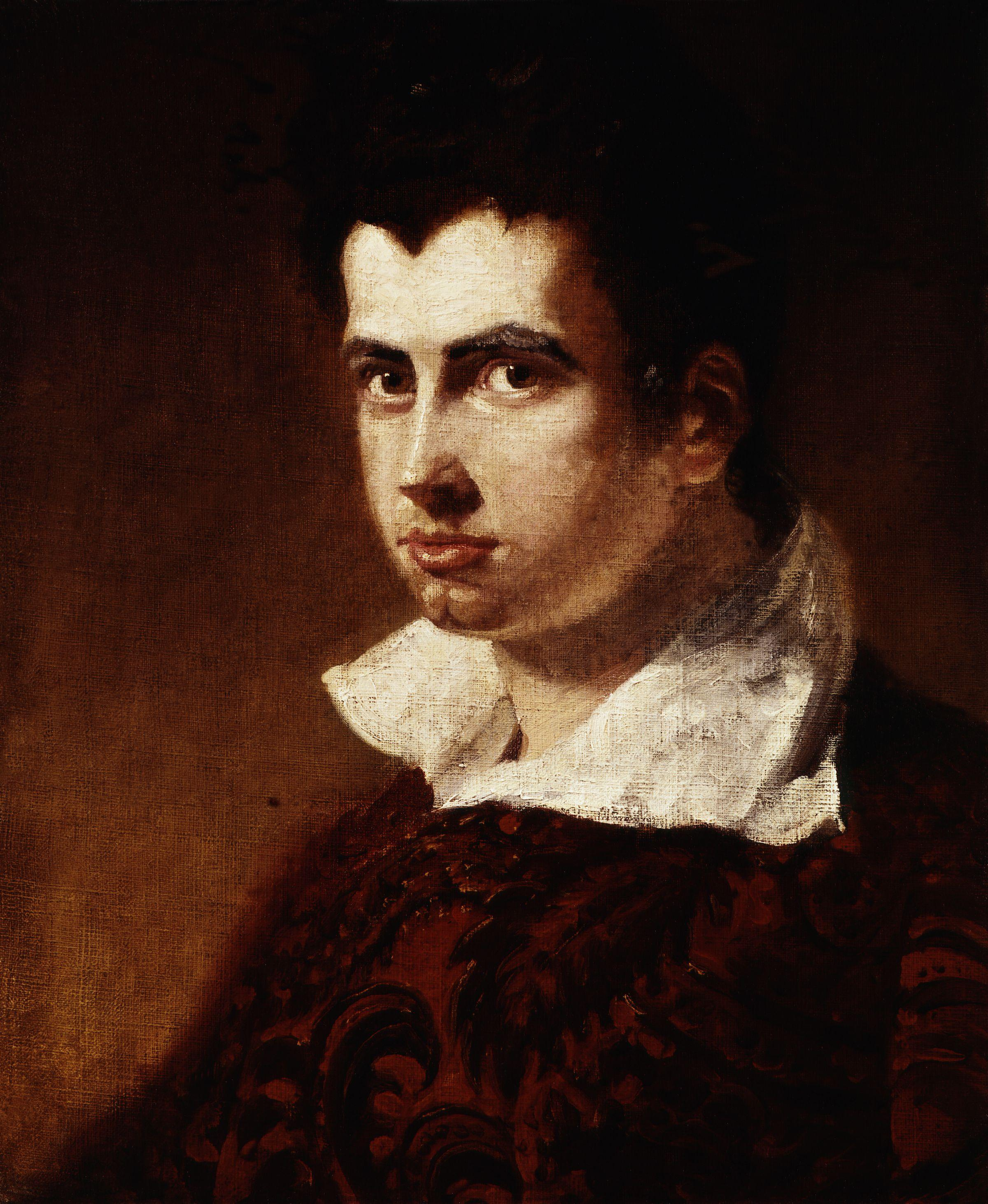
Leigh Hunt, by Benjamin Robert Haydon, c. 1811

Hazlitt and Hunt became close friends—helped by their strong radical political alignment—but Hunt's self-centred ways and Hazlitt's irritation with, and finally his tactless open reaction to, Hunt's egotism severely strained their relationship. The friendship survived, however, and when he included Hunt in The Spirit of the Age, as in the other sketches, Hazlitt took a measured approach; in making the transition, for contrast, from Moore to Hunt, Hazlitt walks a fine line, balancing critical assessment with personal and political considerations.

Distinguished as a poet, Hunt is at the same time, according to Hazlitt, one of the finest prose writers among those primarily known as poets (along with Southey, as he remarks in the sketch of the latter poet). He singles out for special mention several of Hunt's poems, yet along the way expresses numerous qualifications. "A light, familiar grace, and mild unpretending pathos are the characteristics of his more sportive or serious writings, whether in poetry or prose. A smile plays round the sparkling features of the one; a tear is ready to start from the other." And yet, "He perhaps takes too little pains, and indulges in too much wayward caprice in both." Moreover, "He sometimes trifles with his readers, or tires of a subject. ..."

What is distinctive about Leigh Hunt, according to Hazlitt, and compensates for his faults as an author, is his captivating personality. "Indeed, the very faults of his style are virtues in the individual. His natural gaiety and spriteliness of manner, his high animal spirits, and the vinous quality of his mind, produce an immediate fascination and intoxication in those who come in contact with him ... . His look, his tone are required to point many things that he says ... ." Even Hunt's egotism becomes excusable on better acquaintance: "his frank, cordial manner reconciles you instantly to a little over-bearing, over-weening self-complacency."

"We have said that Lord Byron is a sublime coxcomb: why should we not say that Mr. Hunt is a delightful one? [His] natural gaiety and spriteliness of manner, his high animal spirits, and the vinous quality of his mind, produce an immediate fascination and intoxication in those who come in contact with him ... ."

— William Hazlitt, "Mr. T. Moore—Mr. Leigh Hunt", The Spirit of the Age

Summing up while alluding to the politically motivated attacks that prevented Hunt's fuller acceptance as a major literary figure in his time, Hazlitt draws a comparison with certain gentleman-poets of an earlier age, integrating this with what he has noted of Hunt's personal vanity: "We have said that Lord Byron is a sublime coxcomb: why should we not say that Mr. Hunt is a delightful one? ... He is the only poet or literary man we ever knew who puts us in mind of Sir John Suckling or Killigrew or Carew; or who united rare intellectual acquirements with outward grace and natural gentility. ... A wit and a poet, Mr. Hunt is also distinguished by fineness of tact and sterling sense: he has only been a visionary in humanity, the fool of virtue." And here Hazlitt brings in the main reason for the hostile politically oriented attacks on him in Tory periodicals, his notorious criticism of the Prince Regent in his own periodical: "What then is the draw-back to so many shining qualities, that has made them useless, or even hurtful to their owner? His crime is, to have been Editor of the Examiner ten years ago ...".

Nearly two centuries afterward, Hunt's biographer Anthony Holden found this sketch of Hunt as "vivid (and candid) as any we have ...".

=== Elia, and Geoffrey Crayon ===
"Elia" and "Geoffrey Crayon" were pen names of Charles Lamb and Washington Irving, respectively. Both authors enjoyed sudden, near simultaneous, popularity in Britain in 1820, as Lamb began his celebrated series of essays under the name "Elia" in The London Magazine in that year, and Irving, the first American author to attract significant notice in Europe, had his collection of essays and short stories, The Sketch Book of Geoffrey Crayon, Gent., published in Britain.

In the light of their near-simultaneous emergence into the literary spotlight, Hazlitt presents the two as a contrasted pair. While Irving created a considerable stir when he burst on the English scene, and was at that time the more popular of the two, to Hazlitt that phenomenon was a consequence of the current rage for novelty. Irving's writings made for pleasant reading, Hazlitt allowed, yet he believed that Lamb, whose writing under the pen name of "Elia" is Hazlitt's chief focus here, was more original and deserved greater attention.

==== Elia ====
"Elia" was the best-known pen name of Charles Lamb (1775–1834), an English essayist, critic, antiquarian, and poet. Having been close friends with Lamb for almost two decades, Hazlitt had written warmly of his frequent attendance at Charles and Mary Lamb's "at home" gatherings, he and Charles had had endless literary discussions and had sometimes written on the same topics, and Hazlitt had dedicated his book Characters of Shakespear's Plays to Lamb, all of which provided Hazlitt with a wealth of personal impressions to draw upon. Thus, to a far greater extent than with Irving—of whom he notes little more of a personal nature than that he was "agreeable"—Hazlitt to a considerable degree interweaves personal elements into his account of Lamb.

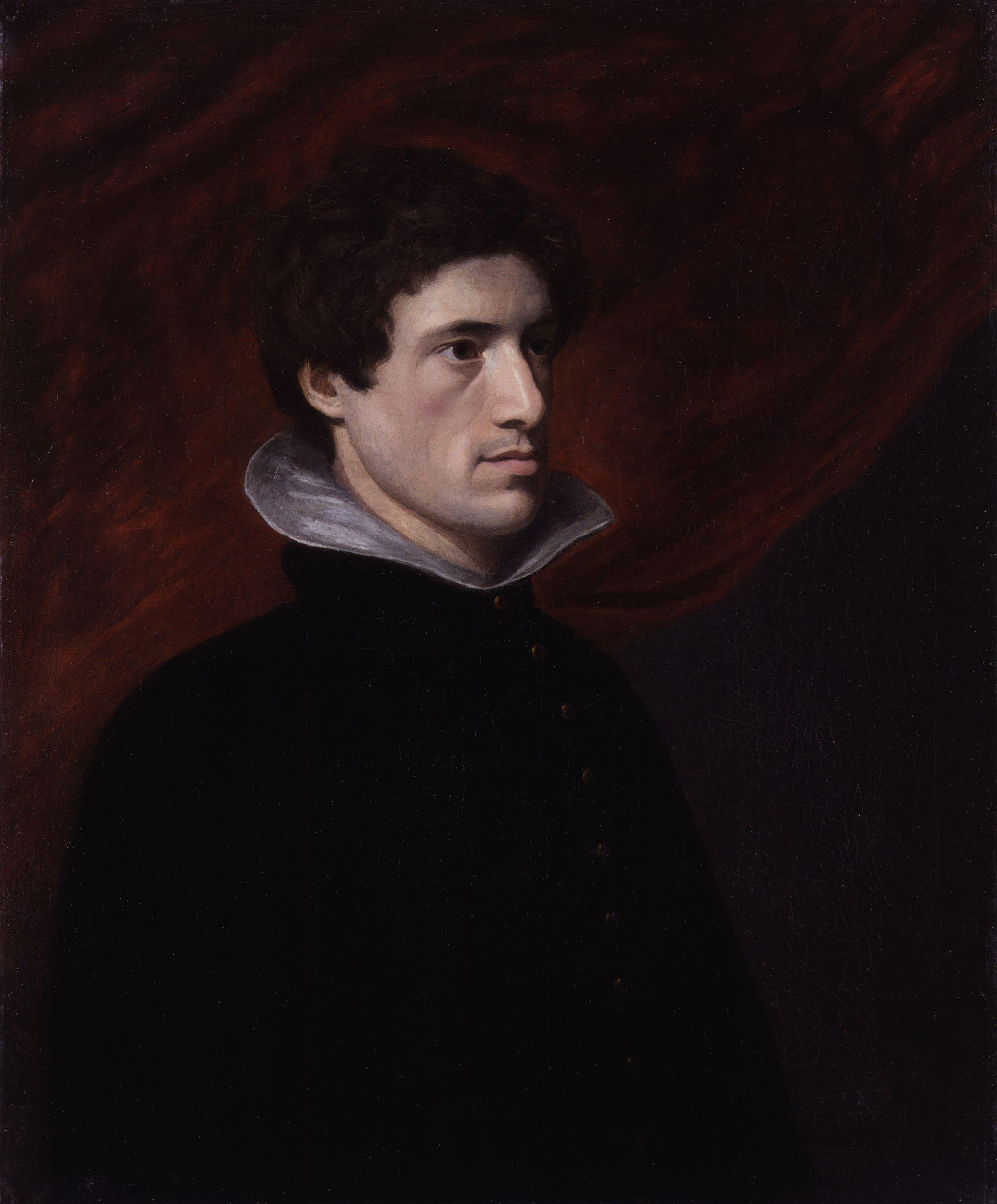
Charles Lamb, by William Hazlitt, 1804

Lamb's shyness and unpretentiousness, combined with his personal convictions and critical taste, along with his antiquarian preferences, Hazlitt explains, have led him away from the fashions of the day. In his writing as "Elia", he "has borrowed from previous sources", but his taste and discernment enable his style to "run ... pure and clear, though it may often take an underground course, or be conveyed through old-fashioned conduit-pipes." "He has none of the turbulence or froth of new-fangled opinions." Rather, "Mr. Lamb has the very soul of an antiquarian, as this implies a reflecting humanity. ... He is shy, sensitive, the reverse of every thing coarse, vulgar, obtrusive, and commonplace." "Mr. Lamb succeeds not by conforming to the Spirit of the Age, but in opposition to it. He does not march boldly along with the crowd, but steals off the pavement to pick his way in the contrary direction."

Although there is something of an affectation in Lamb's focus on the past, "the obscure and remote", that focus is justified by its depth of humanity. He discerns that which possesses an "intrinsic and silent merit". As Hazlitt epitomises Lamb's style, using a metaphor derived from painting, there is a touch of sadness in his essays' brightest passages, "a fine tone of chiaro-scuro, a moral perspective in his writings."

"Mr. Lamb succeeds not by conforming to the Spirit of the Age, but in opposition to it. He does not march boldly along with the crowd, but steals off the pavement to pick his way in the contrary direction."

— William Hazlitt, "Elia, and Geoffrey Crayon", The Spirit of the Age

Hazlitt then probes Lamb's distaste for the new, and affection for the past, but that only as it has "something personal and local in it." He mentions with approval Lamb's sketches of "the former inmates of the South-Sea House", his firm yet subtle sketch of the title character of the essay "Mrs. Battle's Opinions on Whist", his portrayal of "lasting and lively emblems of human infirmity" in fictionalised sketches of his friends and family, and then, "With what a gusto Mr. Lamb describes the inns and courts of law, the temple and Gray's-Inn, as if he had been a student there for the last two hundred years", and, in general, his ability to render the life and implied history in his native city: "The streets of London are his fairy-land, teeming with wonder, with life and interest in his retrospective glance, as it did to the eager eye of childhood: he has contrived to weave its tritest traditions into a bright and endless romance!"

Hazlitt then reflects further on Lamb's taste in literature and art, his abilities as a conversationalist, and his appearance and personal character. "Mr. Lamb's taste in books is not the worse for a little idiosyncrasy ... no man can give a better account of Burton's Anatomy of Melancholy, or Sir Thomas Brown's [sic] Urn-Burial, or Fuller's Worthies, or John Bunyan's Holy War. ... no one relishes a recondite beauty more" than he. Hazlitt tempers his praise with a note of reservation: "His worst fault is an over-eagerness of enthusiasm, which occasionally makes him take a surfeit of his highest favourites." But then, as a conversationalist, at which he excels nearly as much as in his writing, "He is as little of a proser as possible; but he blurts out the finest wit and sense in the world." Hazlitt intersperses a few more thoughts on Lamb's character and notes that he "is a general favourite", explaining this with the psychological observation that this is in part due to the absence of any kind of threat posed by Lamb's modest, unassuming personality, indeed by his personal shortcomings. Hazlitt also observes that such a retiring character as his might never have been noticed if not for the phenomenon of the periodical press of the day. And that led to a popularity, especially for his depictions of London, great enough that the Elia essays procured Lamb "civic honours (a thing unheard of in our times), and he has been invited, in his character of Elia, to dine at a select party with the Lord Mayor."

Looking back a century and a half later, the critic John Kinnaird finds Hazlitt's presentation of Lamb, especially in the place where it is inserted, to be more appropriate than is immediately obvious. "It may seem inapposite that Hazlitt's panorama of the Zeitgeist should end with glimpses of a crotchety bibliophile indulging in an eccentric taste for literary antiquities at a bookstall in an alley off Fleet Street," Kinnaird muses. "But precisely this contrast with the public world of political London serves to make Hazlitt's critical point. The figure of Elia represents in the symbolic landscape of the age those least tractable but deeply natural 'infirmities' of man which, ignored by, when not wholly invisible to, the humorless self-abstraction of modern pride, will never be made to yield to 'the progress of intellectual refinement.'"

==== Geoffrey Crayon ====
"Geoffrey Crayon" was the pen name under which the American essayist, short-story writer, biographer, historian, and humourist Washington Irving (1783–1859) first became popular in Europe. His Sketch Book of Geoffrey Crayon, Gent., published in Britain in 1820, was a collection of travel sketches, short stories, folk tales, and miscellaneous essays. It included the two stories by which Irving is best remembered, "Rip Van Winkle" and "The Legend of Sleepy Hollow".

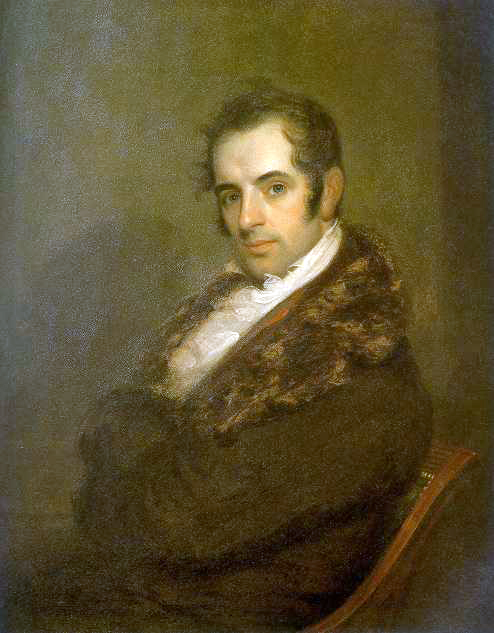
Washington Irving, by John Wesley Jarvis, 1809

Many contemporary critics in England and Scotland praised the book as an original, distinctly American contribution to literature. A century and more afterward, critics observed the influences that Irving shared with his Romantic contemporaries, in particular the influence of Sir Walter Scott, and Irving's own original contributions to literary form. At the outset, Hazlitt, on the other hand, restricts the scope of his examination of Irving's "Geoffrey Crayon" writings, reserving judgement about the material set in America, and choosing to focus entirely on Irving's observations of English life that occupy the greater portion of the collection.

It is here, Hazlitt finds, where Irving comes up short. The English life that Irving describes is that of the past. So heavily influenced is Irving by the English writers of the previous century, maintains Hazlitt, that the very characters he depicts in his wanderings through England are those that might have appeared in essays by Addison or Steele, or novels by Fielding, character types that flourished in the eighteenth century but are not representative of those found in the nineteenth.

"Mr. Irvine's [sic] language is with great taste and felicity modeled on that of Addison, Goldsmith, Sterne, or Mackenzie .... Instead of looking round to see what we are, he sets to work to describe us as we were—at second hand. He has Parson Adams, or Sir Roger de Coverley in his 'mind's eye'; and he makes a village curate or a country 'squire sit to these admired models for their portraits in the beginning of the nineteenth century."

— William Hazlitt, "Elia, and Geoffrey Crayon", The Spirit of the Age

Arriving in England for the first time, the American writer, in Hazlitt's judgement, saw what he encountered with the eyes of one steeped in the writings of the previous century. Irving, he notes, has absorbed the refined style of the older writers and writes well: "Mr. Irvine's [sic] language is with great taste and felicity modeled on that of Addison, Goldsmith, Sterne, or Mackenzie"; but what he sees might have been seen with their eyes, and are such as are scarcely to be found in modern England. "Instead of looking round to see what we are, he sets to work to describe us as we were—at second hand. He has Parson Adams, or Sir Roger de Coverley in his 'mind's eye'; and he makes a village curate or a country 'squire sit to these admired models for their portraits in the beginning of the nineteenth century." As such characters and customs hardly had any actual existence any more, Hazlitt even suggests that they might have been spun out of Irving's imagination, based on his reading of the English authors of the previous century.

Paralleling his treatment of other contemporaries, Hazlitt concludes with a glance at Irving's character and appearance, combined with a summing up of the key flaw in the books Irving produced to introduce himself to the British public: "Mr. Irvine [sic] is himself, we believe, a most agreeable and deserving man, and has been led into the natural and pardonable error we speak of, by the tempting bait of European popularity ..." He has served up England's most "attractive and praise-worthy" characters of the previous century, overflowing with "simplicity, honesty, modesty, hospitality, and good-nature." This compliments his hosts' "national and Tory prejudices; and coupled with literal or exaggerated portraits of Yankee peculiarities, could hardly fail to please."

A century and a half afterward, in view of the warm reception Irving received from many other British literary eminences, critic Jeffrey Rubin-Dorsky observed that Hazlitt, in this instance, turned out to be Irving's severest British critic.

==== James Sheridan Knowles ====
Another paragraph, not part of the essay on Lamb and Irving (though at first glance appearing to be so), is tacked on to the end of the English editions (but not the Paris edition) of The Spirit of the Age, in which Hazlitt offers a few appreciative words about his friend James Sheridan Knowles (1784–1862), an Irish-born actor and dramatist whose family had moved to England when he was a child. When Knowles was 15 years old, Hazlitt, then earning a living primarily as a portrait painter, was commissioned to capture Knowles and his sister on canvas. Knowles and Hazlitt took a liking to each other, kept in touch, and as Hazlitt delved more deeply into literature, he took the talented younger man, who had already published poetry, under his wing, offering constructive criticism of his literary output. Distance kept the two apart for years, but they maintained a friendly relationship, later finding time to see each other in London and Scotland.

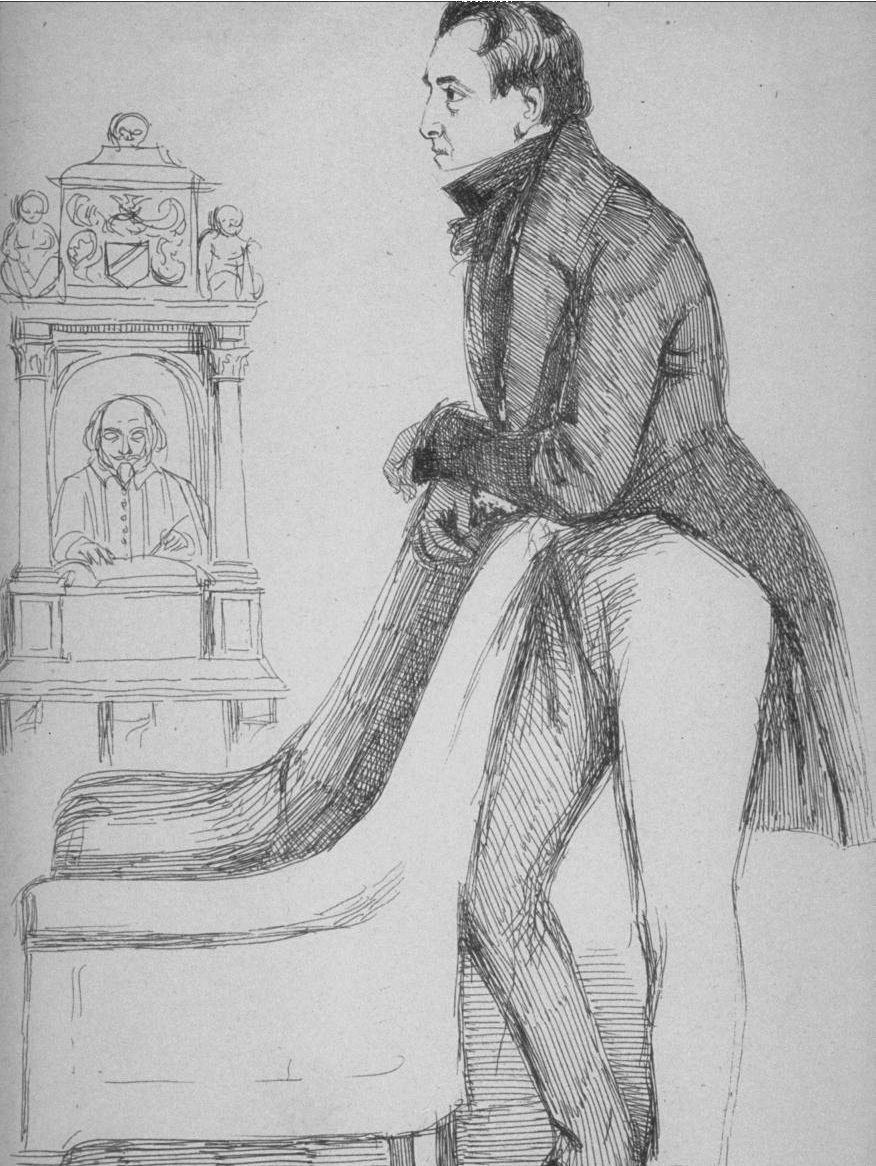
James Sheridan Knowles, 1833

In 1820, Hazlitt travelled to London from his country retreat at Winterslow, Wiltshire, to attend a performance of Knowles's tragedy Virginius at Covent Garden. By then a respected drama critic, Hazlitt had, in The London Magazine just a few months earlier, lamented the dearth of good tragic drama, to which he thought the social climate was not conducive. Yet, in his review in the same magazine, he reacted favourably to Knowles's play, as well as the superlative performance of William Macready as the title character, pleasantly surprised that his old friend had blossomed into at the very least a highly competent writer of tragedy at such an unfavourable time. "Virginius is a good play ... . A real tragedy; a sound historical painting", Hazlitt wrote in "The Drama: No VII" of July 1820. "Strange to say," he added sarcastically, "in this age of poetical egotism, the author, in writing his play, has been thinking of Virginius and his daughter, more than of himself!"

Mr. Knowles is "the first tragic writer of the age" who pours into his plays "impulses of [his] natural feeling, and produces a perfect work of art."

— William Hazlitt, "Elia, and Geoffrey Crayon", The Spirit of the Age

Thus, a few years later, Hazltt saw fit to conclude his assessment of the "spirit of the age" with a nod to Knowles. Acknowledging his long friendship with the dramatist, he puts forth his belief that Knowles's Virginius is "the best acting tragedy that has been produced on the modern stage." Knowles himself is "the first tragic writer of the age" because he keeps his ego out of his plays; following no rules and having read few plays, he has observed closely what little of life he has experienced, and then, aided by the practice of having been an actor himself, he focuses intensely on his subject and pours into his plays the "impulses of [his] natural feeling, and produces a perfect work of art." On a personal basis, Hazlitt concludes, the man is so self-effacing that you would never be able to connect his plays with his personality without knowing the fact that he is their author. Briefly, with the personal emphasis he adds to most of the essays in The Spirit of the Age, Hazlitt reflects that, when not focused on his drama, Knowles lives a retired life: he modestly "divides his time and affections between his plots and his fishing tackle, between the Muses' spring, and those mountain-streams which sparkle like his own eye, that gush out like his own voice at the sight of an old friend."

Hazlitt's biographer Ralph Wardle, a century and a half later, found his way of ending The Spirit of the Age with a nod to Knowles "anticlimactic".

== Critical reception ==
When The Spirit of the Age appeared at the beginning of 1825, Hazlitt's reputation had been tarnished, and, according to biographer Duncan Wu, his "name was dirt." At the very least, he was frequently disparaged as, in the words of A. C. Grayling, an "immoral and splenetic critic." Yet the book sold very well and proved to be among the most popular of Hazlitt's books.

Despite Hazlitt's unsavory reputation, reviews of The Spirit of the Age were far from entirely negative. The reviewer in The New Monthly Magazine, readily identifying the author (the English editions were published anonymously), observed that this was "another volume from the reckless, extravagant, and hasty, but acute, brilliant, spirit-stirring, and always entertaining pen of the author of 'Table-Talk'; for his it must be—or the devil's."

Here is "another volume from the reckless, extravagant, and hasty, but acute, brilliant, spirit-stirring, and always entertaining pen of the author of 'Table-Talk'; for his it must be—or the devil's."

— The New Monthly Magazine, March 1825

The respected Quarterly Review (a Tory periodical that had been severely critical of Hazlitt in the past) conspicuously ignored the book. Overall, however, the book was widely noticed, with the reviews running the gamut from outright abuse to effusive, though almost always highly qualified, praise. The reviewer in the May 1825 issue of Blackwood's Magazine, the source of many of the harshest attacks on Hazlitt in earlier years, stood out with an unrelieved rant against the book and its author, raising the question, "Now that the Pillory is ... taken down, what adequate and appropriate punishment is there that we can inflict on this rabid caitiff?" The Literary Gazette found the book mostly unintelligible and maintained that Hazlitt was too much "guided by personal feelings rather than a regard to fidelity and likeness". The London Magazine saw in it "a vast quantity of verbiage that overlays and smothers his better sense". The Monthly Review thought the author showed undisciplined "malice prepense".

A number of other reviewers, however, still hedging their praise with qualifiers—noting, for example, that Hazlitt's sketches tend more toward caricature than fully rounded likenesses (The Eclectic Review), or that he weakens his position by showing "a dash of the coxcomb in his criticisms" (The Gentleman's Magazine)—nevertheless had much to offer in praise. The European Magazine admired the book's elegant writing. The Philomathic Journal praised Hazlitt's "extraordinary talent" and the book's "many happy illustrations, many ingenious thoughts, excellent sentiments, and brilliant displays of imagination." And Albany Fonblanque's review in The Examiner staunchly defended the book against its harshest assailants.

Hazlitt was known to have been badly affected by one notable review, that of Francis Jeffrey, himself one of the "spirits of the age", who published his assessment of The Spirit of the Age in the April 1825 issue of the Edinburgh Review, which Hazlitt did not see until September. Jeffrey, who had boosted Hazlitt's reputation considerably in 1817 with his favourable reception of Characters of Shakespear's Plays, was far less kind to this book. He praised the book's frequently brilliant ideas and Hazlitt's "being an advocate of human liberty and improvement". But he also chastised Hazlitt for his "perpetual hunting after originality, and a determination to say every thing in a strange manner, [which] lead him into paradox, error, and extravagance; and give a tinge of affectation to his style." Hazlitt, who liked and respected Jeffrey, was badly shaken. He had contributed to his Edinburgh Review for years, but now several more years were to elapse until he attempted any communication with Jeffrey, nor did he contribute again to the Edinburgh Review until Jeffrey had resigned as its editor.

Hereafter, stung by Jeffrey's criticism, Hazlitt focused his attention elsewhere, giving particular weight to writing a biography of Napoleon, which he thought would be remembered as his masterpiece. But neither that nor any other of his later writings sold as well as The Spirit of the Age. However imperfectly appreciated by the critics of his time, the book was read and enjoyed.

== Themes ==
The title of The Spirit of the Age would seem to announce the book's central theme; yet, as late as 1971, a major criticism was that no discernible theme emerges. Hazlitt's biographer Ralph Wardle described the book as a "vivid panorama" of the times, but one that, hastily written and loosely organised, failed to arrive at a clear definition of what the age's "spirit" truly was. At best, as in the essays on Godwin, Coleridge, Wordsworth, and a few others, asserts Wardle, Hazlitt "was clearly working toward a definition of" the spirit of the age; but the subjects of the individual essays "remain 'Spirits of the Age' rather than facets of the spirit of the age."

"A bias to abstraction is evidently ... the reigning spirit of the age ...".

— William Hazlitt, "The Drama, No. IV", The London Magazine, April 1820

With Hazlitt's work attracting increased interest and undergoing intense scrutiny around this time, however, critics' attitudes toward The Spirit of the Age as a unified composition began to undergo a radical shift. According to Roy Park, a central theme in fact emerges: Hazlitt's criticism of the excessive "abstraction" in the literature and discourse of the time, in part the effect of a growing interest in science. This had been anticipated by Hazlitt's having written, several years earlier, "A bias to abstraction is evidently ... the reigning spirit of the age ...". A tendency in the influential and respected writing of the time noted by Hazlitt, as well as some before him, was the formation of premature generalisations, with a failure to embrace the richness of human experience. There was considerable debate at the time about the influence of science and philosophical reasoning on poetry, as well as on the discourse of the age more generally. Poetry, in Hazlitt's words, is successful insofar as it results from "an aggregate of well-founded particulars"; the generalisations of science, while more naturally "abstract", must not be formed prematurely, before the fullness of experience is completely accounted for. John Kinnaird, supporting Park's conclusions a few years later, writes that "Hazlitt is extending his reference [to a 'bias to abstraction'] here beyond the abstractions of reason and science; he has in mind several other kinds of 'abstraction' from the reality of self ... especially ... the highly generalized, dubiously 'poetic' anti-empiricism of Coleridge and other Transcendentalists."

"The spirit of the age" is "the progress of intellectual refinement, warring with our natural infirmities".

— William Hazlitt, "On the Pleasure of Hating", The Plain Speaker (1823)

But, notes Kinnaird, this does not completely account for what emerges from Hazlitt's book, a collection of essays not wholly dissimilar to many other contemporary series of essays on notable living persons; but one in which, as the author entered into their composition more intently, consciously and deliberately developed a critical stance that in its own fashion could be considered to be an account of a "spirit of the age". This was not necessarily just a single tendency, nor was it likely, according to Kinnaird, that Hazlitt shared a belief in the growing idea at the time, especially in Germany, of the "Zeitgeist", that is, a spirit that, operating outside of any individual thinkers, shapes the overall thought and actions of the age. But there is indeed, asserts Kinnaird, a consciously undertaken set of "themes" implicit in what Hazlitt included in the series of essays. This is reinforced, as Park had noted, by the ordering of the essays, especially by Hazlitt's choice for the last edition. There the essays show a thoughtful grouping, in which the "spirit" of the age emerges indirectly and implicitly, by the "massing of particulars". It is, Park maintains, this very massing of particulars that significantly supports Hazlitt's criticism of excessive abstraction that he had been developing. The Spirit of the Age was meant, insists Park, as an example of a book that itself avoids premature introduction of abstract assertions. The ordering of the essays, moreover, is anything but hasty and careless. Thus, Scott, who in his novels stands out as avoiding abstraction as well as egotism (another thematic thread in Hazlitt's book) by directing his focus on his characters, is followed by Byron, an extreme example of a poetic genius who nevertheless misses much of humanity by focusing on himself.

Kinnaird also points to a "dialectic of conflict" as a thematic thread, a key to which is a statement Hazlitt had made in a somewhat earlier essay: "the spirit of the age" is "the progress of intellectual refinement, warring with our natural infirmities". Thus, after beginning with sketches of the major thinkers Bentham, Godwin, and Coleridge (illustrating "the progress of intellectual refinement"), Hazlitt follows them with sketches of now obscure figures, Edward Irving and Horne Tooke, who illustrate more starkly one of the age's "natural infirmities", self-love. More recent opinion has tended to support the existence of such meaningful themes in The Spirit of the Age as a whole, though nothing easily captured in a brief summary. As Roy Park had said earlier, Hazlitt's "critical effort" as a whole can be considered as "a series of intricate and repetitious variations on a theme. In the Spirit of the Age, the theme is implicit in the variations themselves."

Although critical judgements shifted toward agreement that there is more unity than previously thought in The Spirit of the Age as a book, there has been disagreement as to the emotional impact and philosophical implications of the whole. To Tom Paulin much of the tone of the book is comic. To Kinnaird, the book in the end, offering a few rays of hope, depicts the positive aspects of the "spirit of the age" as mostly defeated, and both the "passion of creative genius and the systematic 'principle' of philosophy have failed to save" it. Bromwich concludes similarly that those who have read the book through will find that in the end, "for Hazlitt 'the spirit of the age' is something that has been defeated."

== Style ==
"The Spirit of the Age is one of those rare works of criticism which really do approach to the character of a work of art", observed John Kinnaird in 1978. Shortly thereafter, with increased scrutiny of the "art" in the book, David Bromwich noted that Hazlitt appreciated the extent to which a work of prose could advantageously incorporate elements of poetry. Writing "at the confluence of the Augustan and romantic idioms", Hazlitt created prose that is "dense" with thought, "extraordinarily varied", alternating plain, reasoned explanations, with attempts at "effects of oratorical grandeur". He "can be grave and clever, irritable and above dispute in the quick succession of his moods as his sentences move straight to the mark. The pace and consistency, the head-on stubbornness and willing imperfection of a man talking to you about what concerns him most" are traits that, taken together, form prose like that of no other writer in English.

"The Spirit of the Age is one of those rare works of criticism which really do approach to the character of a work of art".

— John Kinnaird, William Hazlitt: Critic of Power

Following Bromwich, who had noted that Hazlitt had already spent twenty years thinking and writing about many of the subjects of the verbal portraits he sketched before he laid these thoughts down on paper, Tom Paulin's 1998 book-length study explored in depth the specific elements of the style that glued together and propelled that thinking. Poetic imagery, similes, and devices like assonance and alliteration abound. The poet and essayist Robert Southey, for example, is alliteratively described as "practical", "pointed", and "pert", with the "p" sounds emphasising the dry quality of Southey's thought. Since Hazlitt also praises Southey as the best prose writer of any poet of the day, the effect here, claims Paulin, is to add a subtle "textural" undercutting of that praise, introducing a note of ambiguity. The description of Jeremy Bentham's appearance as combining traits of "[Benjamin] Franklin and Charles Fox, with the comfortable double-chin and sleek thriving look of the one, and the quivering lip, the restless eye ... of the other", is tied together by a "subtle assonance" in "thriving" and "quivering", according to Paulin.

Poetic rhythms (as studied in "prosody") are often also used to great effect. Paulin focuses on a frequently praised part of the book, the "epic, wittily affectionate sketch of Coleridge's intellectual development". One paragraph conveys the feeling of a "tumbling, but rather soothing, almost stroking movement"; the passage "and so dwelt for a while in the spirit with John Huss" has a "fluid anapaestic movement", and the rhythms in the sentences that contain it "ask not so much to be read as to be intoned like a familiar reading from the Bible or a children's story." The account of Coleridge mimics the almost too fluid movement of Coleridge's own thought as it "compresses in a beautiful silky manner [his] intellectual development".

Hazlitt, as had been noted for some time, makes frequent use of quotations in his writing, often only indirectly, by "allusion" or even faint "echoes". Sometimes he was chastised for the practice. Now his critics' emphasis was on how expertly Hazlitt could use the material. Paulin concludes that Hazlitt is the "supreme master of the art of quotation", with quotations and allusions adding layers of meaning throughout The Spirit of the Age.

Hazlitt's prose is "dense" with thought, "extraordinarily varied", alternating plain, reasoned explanations, with attempts at "effects of oratorical grandeur". He "can be grave and clever, irritable and above dispute in the quick succession of his moods as his sentences move straight to the mark. The pace and consistency, the head-on stubbornness and willing imperfection of a man talking to you about what concerns him most" are traits that, taken together, form prose like that of no other writer in English.

— David Bromwich on Hazlitt's style, in Hazlitt: The Mind of a Critic

In the celebrated passage on Coleridge's development, Paulin notes that the Latin for a dried, preserved collection of plant specimens, "hortus siccus", is brought in as "the hortus siccus of Dissent, where [Coleridge] pared religion down to the standard of reason". The term had been notably used with a negative connotation by Edmund Burke in his Reflections on the Revolution in France. But elsewhere, in his own writing, Hazlitt in expounding on the character of the Protestant Dissenters had used this term with more positive connotations, lauding them for their steadfast adherence to their principles. This metaphoric allusion, therefore, adds a note of ambiguity, the more apparent to those who had read Hazlitt's own earlier writing as well as Burke's, but still potentially present.

In dissecting Hazlitt's account of Coleridge's development, Paulin also allies himself with those who found deliberate art in the ordering of the essays, an ordering that not only contributes shape and movement to the book but affords meaningful comparisons. It is no accident that the Coleridge sketch immediately follows that of Godwin. Godwin had been brought up in the Dissenting tradition, and, although Coleridge possessed the superior intellect, it was Godwin's steadfastness that enabled some kinds of achievements unattainable by Coleridge, with his wavering, airy, insubstantial thinking. The sketch of Bentham precedes both, as an example of the driest reasoner of the three, ushering in an "age of steamboats and steam central heating". The "spirit" of the age is thus conveyed indirectly and subtly, by depicting contending, multifaceted forces, rather than as a single, simple entity.

Not only poetry but painting, claims Paulin, exerted a measurable influence on this book. Hazlitt especially admired the Italian Renaissance painter Titian, noting in his art criticism how adept Titian was at capturing his subjects as if in the moment. Rather than the detriment it had been seen as only a quarter-century earlier, Hazlitt's haste in composing the essays in this book is seen by Paulin as an asset, using Hazlitt's own analogy with a glass blower who after long preparation must rapidly shape a glass artwork in the heat of the moment. Himself working in this manner, and inspired by the visual arts, Hazlitt, according to Paulin, was able to imbue his sketches with that feeling of immediacy, so, at times, the reader feels as if attending a play. Hazlitt here even anticipates the modern television documentary, while in the process laying the groundwork for much of modern journalism.

== Legacy ==
The Spirit of the Age was for long seen as a lively, opinionated account of Hazlitt's notable contemporaries, filled with keen observations but marred by the author's prejudices. Views of the book soon began to evolve, however, with emphasis shifting to the pinpoint accuracy of many of Hazlitt's judgements, rendered while his subjects were still living, and therefore all the more remarkable for their impartiality. Only long afterward, the book came to be valued as a subtle, unified masterpiece of criticism, itself a work of art, with an impact far more than ephemeral, and exerting an influence on the literature of the later 19th century and beyond.

Hazlitt was unique in his day, a "representative observer" whose observations on what lay "directly before him" were so objective as to have the effect of "prophecy".

— David Bromwich, Hazlitt: The Mind of a Critic

Shortly following Hazlitt's death, the general idea of the book was emulated by books and articles with similar or identical titles, such as "The Spirit of the Age" (a series in The Examiner, 1831), by John Stuart Mill, and A New Spirit of the Age (1844), by R. H. Horne.

The book's influence also took other forms less direct or obvious. For example, Hazlitt's critique of Jeremy Bentham and his world view resonated, according to Tom Paulin, with Charles Dickens, who was known to appreciate Hazlitt's work, showing its effects in Bleak House and elsewhere. The likelihood of influence of The Spirit of the Age on the writings of successors like Charles Augustin Sainte-Beuve, Thomas Carlyle, Thomas Babington Macaulay, and others, was also noted.

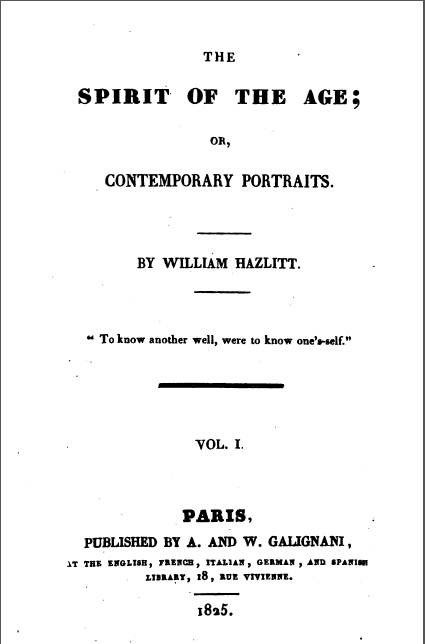
The Spirit of the Age, Paris edition, vol. I, title page, 1825

Long before the unity of the book as a whole gained critical acceptance, many individual articles were singled out for praise over the years. The earlier sketches in particular were frequently cited as masterpieces in their own right. The account of Bentham, for example, was notable both as "the first sustained critique of dogmatic Utilitarianism" and as a major anticipation of modern journalism. The essay on Coleridge was praised for its stylistic triumphs and for being one of the best contemporary accounts of the man. Hazlitt's account of Coleridge's intellectual development was especially spotlighted: "for three brilliant pages", observed critic John Kinnaird, "Hazlitt reviews the saga of Coleridge's voyage through strange seas of thought". As early as 1940, the scholar, critic, and intellectual historian Basil Willey pointed to the essay on Godwin as "still the fairest and most discerning summary" of Godwin's achievement. The account of Southey was appreciated not only at the turn of the 21st century, but decades earlier, in 1926, by historian Crane Brinton, who approved of Hazlitt's "critical intelligence" in that sketch.

"... a reminder of where the modern age began."

— Duncan Wu, William Hazlitt: The First Modern Man

Despite the overall critical preference for the earlier essays, over the years some of the later ones received nods of approval as well. Biographers of Cobbett (James Sambrook in 1973), Moore (Miriam Allen deFord in 1967), and Hunt (Anthony Holden in 2005), for example, commended the accuracy of Hazlitt's judgement in assessing those contemporaries. For its critical acumen, David Bromwich singled out the portrait of George Crabbe, with Hazlitt's forward-looking discussion of the relationship of a fictional world to the world it draws upon.

In time, critics and biographers, looking back, observed how unbiased this book was, and the uncanncy accuracy with which Hazlitt weighed the relative importance of many of his subjects. Wordsworth, for example, was not then regarded by the reading public as the major poet he later was; yet Hazlitt saw Wordsworth as the greatest poet of the day, the founder of a whole new "original vein in poetry".

The Spirit of the Age also marked a notable change in attitude. Hazlitt had been frequently condemned for his splenetic attacks on contemporaries like Wordsworth, Coleridge, and Southey. Yet it was later noted how fair, even "generous", Hazlitt's treatment of these figures in this book was. According to David Bromwich, Hazlitt was unique in his day, a "representative observer" whose observations on what lay "directly before him" were so objective as to have the effect of "prophecy".

With its combination of critical analysis and personal sketches of notable figures captured "in the moment", Hazlitt in The Spirit of the Age laid the groundwork for much of modern journalism and to an extent even created a new literary form, the "portrait essay" (although elements of it had been anticipated by Samuel Johnson and others). The book is now frequently viewed as "one of Hazlitt's finest achievements", his "masterpiece", the "crowning ornament of Hazlitt's career, and ... one of the lasting glories of nineteenth-century criticism." The Spirit of the Age, according to Duncan Wu, is still the best account of "the Romantic period", and is important "not just as cultural history, but as a reminder of where the modern age began."
