= Characters of Shakespear's Plays =

Book by William Hazlitt

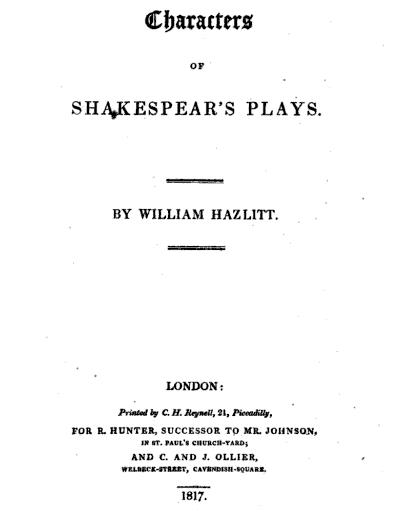
- Title page of Characters of Shakespear's Plays 1st edition
- Author: William Hazlitt
- Language: English
- Genre: Literary criticism
- Publisher: Rowland Hunter with Charles and James Ollier
- Publication date: 9 July 1817
- Publication place: England
- Media type: Print
- Preceded by: The Round Table
- Followed by: A View of the English Stage

Characters of Shakespear's Plays is an 1817 book of criticism of Shakespeare's plays, written by early nineteenth century English essayist and literary critic William Hazlitt. Composed in reaction to the neoclassical approach to Shakespeare's plays typified by Samuel Johnson, it was among the first English-language studies of Shakespeare's plays to follow the manner of German critic August Wilhelm Schlegel, and, with the work of Samuel Taylor Coleridge, paved the way for the increased appreciation of Shakespeare's genius that was characteristic of later nineteenth-century criticism. It was also the first book to cover all of Shakespeare's plays, intended as a guide for the general reader.

Then becoming known as a theatre critic, Hazlitt had been focusing increasingly on drama as literature, contributing miscellaneous literary criticism to various journals, including the prestigious Edinburgh Review. This was the first of his book-length literary studies. The plays, the thirty-five that Hazlitt considered to be genuine, are covered in thirty-two chapters, with new material added to passages reworked from periodical articles and reviews. A Preface establishes his main theme of the uniqueness of Shakespeare's characters and looks back at earlier Shakespearean criticism. Two concluding chapters on "Doubtful Plays of Shakespear" and the "Poems and Sonnets" round out the book.

The centre of attention is in large part on the characters, described often with a personal slant and using memorable expressions ("It is we who are Hamlet") and incorporating psychological insights that were to become highly influential in later criticism. Though at first less influential, Hazlitt's comments on the plays' dramatic structure and poetry and on the central themes and general mood of each play laid the groundwork for later critics' more elaborate interpretations. Frequently expressing the view that stage presentation could not do justice to Shakespeare's plays, Hazlitt nevertheless also found certain plays eminently actable, and he frequently admired the performances of certain actors, particularly Edmund Kean.

At first highly acclaimed—it made an immediate and powerful impact on the poet John Keats, among others—then brutally criticised, Hazlitt's book lost much of its influence in the author's lifetime, only to re-enter the mainstream of Shakespearean criticism in the late nineteenth century. The first edition sold out quickly; sales of the second, in mid-1818, were at first brisk, but they ceased entirely in the wake of harshly antagonistic, personally directed, politically motivated reviews in the Tory literary magazines of the day. Although some interest continued to be shown in Hazlitt's work as an essayist, it was not until the end of the nineteenth century, long after Hazlitt's death, that significant interest was again shown in his interpretations of Shakespeare. In the twentieth century, the influential critic A.C. Bradley and a few others began to take seriously the book's interpretations of many of Shakespeare's characters. But then Hazlitt along with Bradley was censured for displaying faults of the "character" school of Shakespearean criticism, primarily that of discussing dramatic characters as though they were real people, and again Hazlitt's contributions to Shakespearean criticism were deprecated.

A revival of interest in Hazlitt, as a thinker, began in the mid-20th century. His thoughts on Shakespeare's plays as a whole (particularly the tragedies), his discussions of certain characters such as Shylock, Falstaff, Imogen, Caliban and Iago and his ideas about the nature of drama and poetry in general, such as expressed in the essay on Coriolanus, gained renewed appreciation and influenced other Shakespearean criticism.

Hazlitt's ideas about many of the plays have now come to be valued as thought-provoking alternatives to those of his contemporary Coleridge, and Characters of Shakespear's Plays is now viewed as a major study of Shakespeare's plays, placing Hazlitt with Schlegel and Coleridge as one of the three most notable Shakespearean critics of the Romantic period.

== Background ==
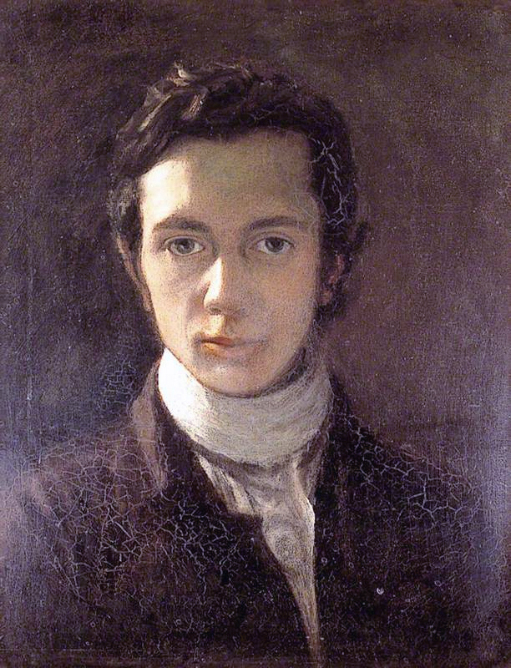
William Hazlitt. A self-portrait from about 1802.

On 26 January 1814, Edmund Kean debuted as Shylock in Shakespeare's Merchant of Venice at London's Drury Lane theatre. William Hazlitt, drama critic for the Morning Chronicle since the previous September, was in the audience. He wrote a stunning review, followed by several others applauding (but sometimes censuring) Kean's performances in other Shakespearean tragedies, including King Richard II, King Richard III, Hamlet, Macbeth, Romeo and Juliet, and, what Hazlitt considered the best of Kean's performances, Othello. (These were written for the Morning Chronicle, the Champion, and the Examiner; he was to continue as principal drama critic for the last of these for three years.) Kean was hitherto unknown in London. Hazlitt, having recently begun a career as a theatrical reviewer, was no better known than the subject of his reviews. These notices quickly brought both Kean and Hazlitt before the public eye.

In the course of his preparing for a drama review, Hazlitt was in the habit of reading or rereading the play he was soon to see, and his reviews came to include extensive commentary on the plays themselves, turning rapidly from dramatic criticism to literary criticism. With Shakespeare in particular, this led to considerations of the ways in which the actors—again, particularly his favourite Kean—communicated the message of the plays. But he also noted ways in which no actor's interpretation could live up to the dramatist's conception.

As his musings developed along these lines, Hazlitt continued to contribute miscellaneous articles to various periodicals. In February 1816, he reviewed August Wilhelm Schlegel's Lectures on Dramatic Literature for the Edinburgh Review. The German critic Schlegel showed an appreciation for Shakespeare of a kind that no one in Hazlitt's country had yet demonstrated, and Hazlitt, sympathising with many of Schlegel's ideas, felt there was a place for a whole book that would provide appreciative criticism of all of Shakespeare's plays. Such a book would provide liberal quotations from the text, and focus on the characters and various qualities particular to each play; and he felt that he could write it. His writing career was now moving in this direction (he had been contributing miscellaneous literary criticism to the Examiner and elsewhere during this period), he needed the money to support his family, and his growing reputation as a drama critic enabled him to have his name appear on the title page (as a reviewer for periodicals, his contributions were anonymous, as was customary at the time).

Thus, Characters of Shakespear's Plays was born. Considerable material that he had already worked up in his drama reviews was incorporated into the book. One essay, on A Midsummer Night's Dream, was taken entire from a contribution to "The Round Table" series in the Examiner, first published on 26 November 1815, with a concluding paragraph tacked on from a drama review, also published in the Examiner, on 21 January 1816. There was material from other essays. Most of "Shakespear's Exact Discrimination of Nearly Similar Characters" (the Examiner, 12 May 1816) made its way into the chapters on King Henry IV, King Henry VI, and Othello. Portions of "Shakespear's Female Characters" (the Examiner, 28 July 1816) found a place in the chapters on Cymbeline and Othello. Hazlitt filled out the rest of what he needed to make a complete book in 1816 and possibly early 1817.

At this time, unhappy with the way his collection The Round Table, issued in the same year, was being promoted by its publisher, he began to promote his new book himself, partly by word of mouth and also by getting a friend to publish the chapter on Hamlet in The Times and requesting Francis Jeffrey, editor of the Edinburgh Review, to notice it in that periodical. He had already had it printed privately (instead of offering it directly to a publisher) by his friend the printer Carew Henry Reynell, who purchased the copyright for £100. As a publicity tactic, copies were circulated privately. Finally, Hazlitt got the book published, by Rowland Hunter and the brothers Charles and James Ollier in collaboration, who brought it out on 9 July 1817. It was extremely successful, this first edition selling out in six weeks. A second edition was issued by Taylor and Hessey in 1818, and later that year an unlicensed edition was brought out in Boston by Wells and Lilly. No further editions appeared in Hazlitt's lifetime.

== Essays ==
Characters of Shakespear's Plays consists primarily of Hazlitt's impressions of and thoughts about all of William Shakespeare's plays he believed to be genuine. It was the first book of the kind that anyone had yet written. His main focus is on the characters that appear in the plays, but he also comments on the plays' dramatic structure and poetry, referring frequently to commentary by earlier critics, as well as the manner in which the characters were acted on stage. The essays on the plays themselves (there is a "Preface" as well as an essay on "Doubtful Plays of Shakespear" and one on the "Poems and Sonnets") number thirty-two, but with two of the essays encompassing five of the plays, the plays discussed amount to thirty-five in number. Though each essay constitutes a chapter in a book, in style and length they resemble those of Hazlitt's miscellaneous collection The Round Table (published also in 1817, a collaboration with Leigh Hunt), which followed the model for periodical essays established a century earlier in The Spectator.

Though Hazlitt could find much to appreciate in the comedies, tragedy was to him inherently more important, and he weights the tragedies much more heavily. In this he differed from Johnson, who thought Shakespeare best at comedy. The greatest of the plays were tragedies—particularly Macbeth, Othello, King Lear, and Hamlet—and Hazlitt's comments on tragedy are often integrated with his ideas about the significance of poetry and imaginative literature in general. As he expressed it at the end of "Lear", tragedy describes the strongest passions, and "the greatest strength of genius is shewn here in describing the strongest passions: for the power of the imagination, in works of invention, must be in proportion to the force of the natural impressions, which are the subject of them."

=== Preface ===
In the "Preface" Hazlitt establishes his focus on "characters" by quoting Pope's comment that "every single character in Shakespear, is as much an individual, as those in life itself". After reviewing various other critics of Shakespeare, Hazlitt focuses on two of the most important, including the influential Dr. Johnson. Hazlitt found the Shakespearean criticism of Johnson, the premier literary critic of the previous era, troubling in several ways. He insufficiently valued the tragedies; he missed the essence of much of the poetry; and he "reduced everything to the common standard of conventional propriety [...] the most exquisite refinement or sublimity produced an effect on his mind, only as they could be translated into the language of measured prose". Johnson also believed that every character in Shakespeare represents a "type" or "species", whereas Hazlitt, siding with Pope, emphasised the individuality of Shakespeare's characters, while discussing them more comprehensively than anyone had yet done.

Rather than an English critic, it was the German August Wilhelm Schlegel, whose lectures on the drama had recently been translated into English, whom Hazlitt believed to be the greatest critic of Shakespeare's plays. Hazlitt here includes long extracts from Schlegel on Shakespeare, differing with him principally with respect to what he called a "mysticism" that appears in Schlegel's interpretations. He shared with Schlegel an enthusiasm for Shakespeare that he found lacking in Dr. Johnson. "An overstrained enthusiasm", he remarks, "is more pardonable with respect to Shakespear than the want of it; for our admiration cannot easily surpass his genius."

=== Cymbeline ===
As one of his favourites, Hazlitt places Cymbeline first in his discussions of Shakespeare's plays, according it extensive treatment. This includes his personal impressions of individual characters—as the book's title would lead us to expect—but also the kind of broader consideration for which he would not be credited for at least a century and a half.

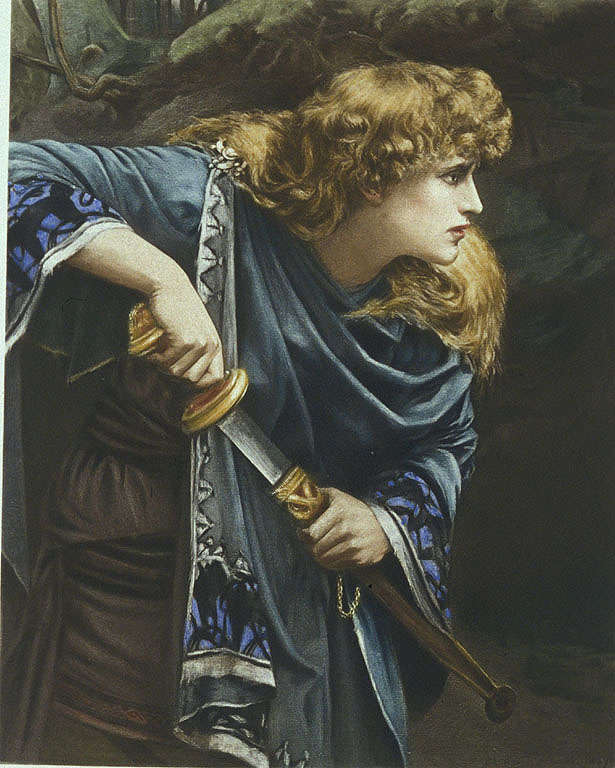
Herbert Gustave Schmalz, Imogen (1888)

The play's "greatest charm is the character of Imogen", writes Hazlitt. He observes how, in justifying her actions, "she relies little on her personal charms" or a prudish "affected antipathy to vice" but rather "on her merit, and her merit is in the depth of her love, her truth and constancy." Shakespeare's presentation is full and rounded. We see her beauty as observed by others (as by the villain Iachimo), but more often we see her from the inside, and are touched when, after endless nights of crying herself awake over the loss of Posthumus, she is outraged to learn (as she is falsely informed) that "'Some Jay of Italy [...] hath betrayed him.'" And we witness a moment in the development of her character, as her resolve to disguise herself to seek out Posthumus grows firmer. "Of all Shakespear's women she is perhaps the most tender and most artless."

Hazlitt broadens the scope of these reflections into a consideration of "Shakespear's heroines" in general, writing, "No one ever hit the true perfection of the female character, the sense of weakness leaning on the strength of its affections for support, so well as Shakespear". (Here Hazlitt incorporates material from his essay "Shakespear's Female Characters", published in the Examiner on 28 July 1816.)

Hazlitt comments to a lesser degree on other characters, such as Bellarius, Guiderius, and Arviragus; more often he shows how the characters relate to each other and to the structure of the play. These three, for example, "are a fine relief to the intrigues and artificial refinements of the court from which they are banished."

The character of Cloten, "the conceited, booby lord", is discussed as an occasion for noting how Shakespeare depicted what is most contradictory in human nature. Cloten, "with all the absurdity of his person and manners, is not without shrewdness in his observations." And again Hazlitt steps back and points out how Shakespeare set one character off against the other and presented characters of similar types but with slight modifications of their otherwise similar traits to convey a certain impression about human nature. Hazlitt observes:

[A]s it happens in most of the author's works, there is not only the utmost keeping in each separate character; but in the casting of the different parts, and their relation to one another, there is an affinity and harmony, like what we may observe in the gradations of colour in a picture. The striking and powerful contrasts in which Shakespear abounds could not escape observation; but the use he makes of the principle of analogy to reconcile the greatest diversities of character and to maintain a continuity of feeling throughout, has not been sufficiently attended to.

As he does with character, Hazlitt observes patterns he discovers in the plot. He will have nothing of criticising it in terms of the classical "unities". The plot must be taken on its own terms. If the action is long-drawn-out, "the interest becomes more aerial and refined from the principle of perspective introduced into the subject by the imaginary changes of scene, as well as by the length of time it occupies."

Regarding Shakespeare's weaving together of the story's threads, Hazlitt marvels at the "ease and conscious unconcern" with which "[t]he most straggling and seemingly casual incidents are contrived [and] in such a manner as to lead at last to the most complete developement of the catastrophe." Again, he broadens the discussion and argues against the view of Dr. Johnson "that Shakespear was generally inattentive to the winding-up of his plots. We think the contrary is true; and we might cite in proof of this remark not only the present play, but the conclusion of Lear, of Romeo and Juliet, of Macbeth, of Othello, even of Hamlet, and of other plays of less moment, in which the last act is crowded with decisive events brought about by natural means."

Beyond plot, beyond individual characters, Hazlitt rounds out his discussion by noting the prevailing mood, the "tender gloom [that] overspreads the whole" play. He sees the parallel yet subtly contrasting lines of the story playing against each other "unconsciously" in the mind of the reader as of the author, working by "the force of natural association, a particular train of thought suggesting different inflections of the same predominant feeling, melting into, and strengthening one another, like chords in music." Thus, far more than simply commenting on particular characters, Hazlitt elucidates the character of the play as a whole.

=== Coriolanus ===
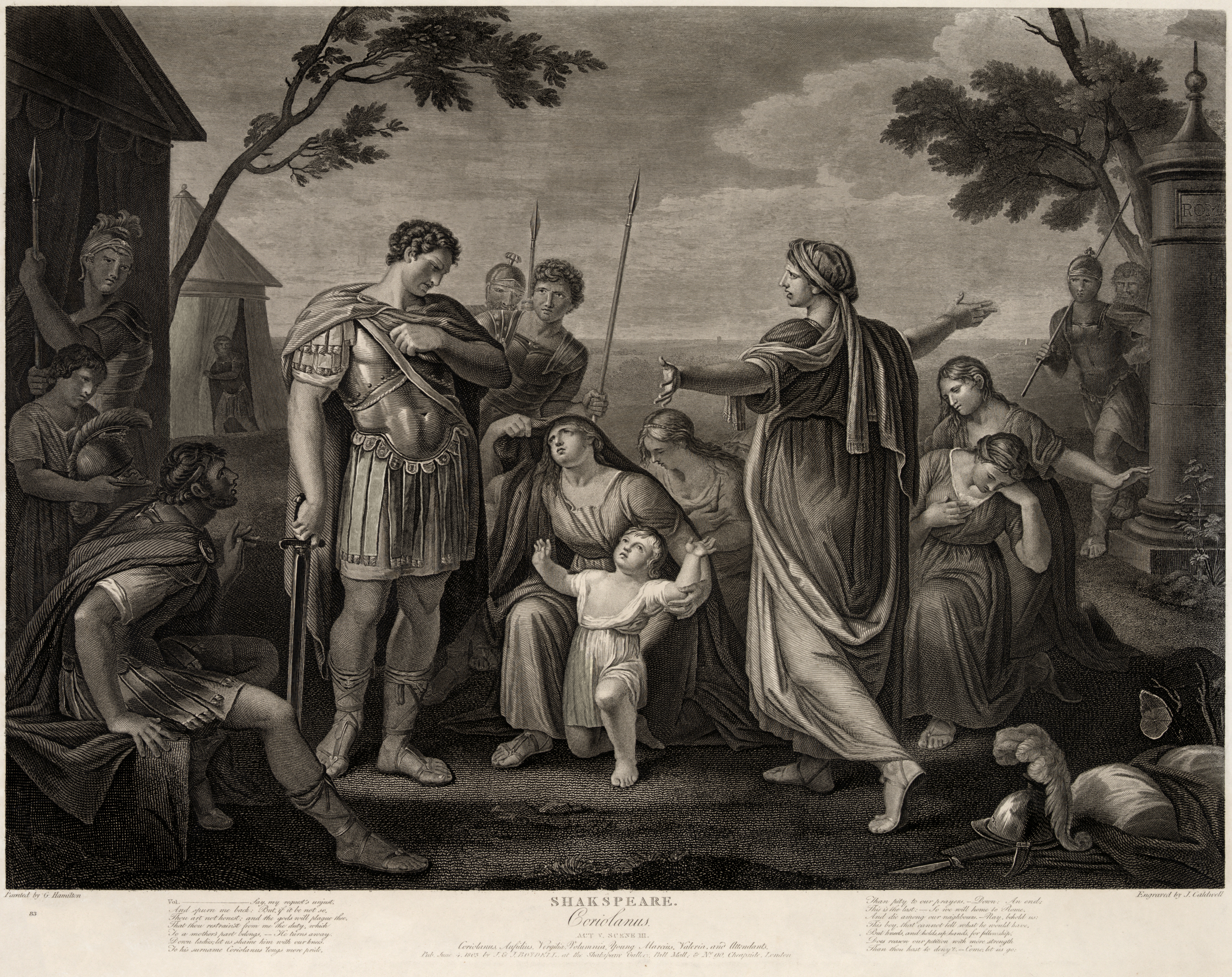
18th-century engraving of Coriolanus Act V, Scene III

Hazlitt's focus in the essay on Coriolanus is less on the various characters of Shakespeare's tragedy than on the fundamental moral and political principles behind their actions. For Hazlitt, this play showed in action the concepts behind political writings of his own day, such as Edmund Burke's Reflections on the Revolution in France and Thomas Paine's Rights of Man. The character of Coriolanus is a type of the aristocratic hero, though presented as a well-rounded individual, with a "pride" consisting of "inflexible sternness of will", a "love of reputation" and "glory", and a "contempt of popular opinion". Hazlitt also comments on the characters of Coriolanus's mother and wife, and he points out the substantial fidelity of this play to its source in Thomas North's translation of Plutarch's Lives of the Noble Greeks and Romans, extracting long passages from the life of Coriolanus.

His primary focus, however, is on Shakespeare's dramatisation of "the arguments for and against aristocracy or democracy, on the privileges of the few and the claims of many". Shakespeare shows the weaknesses of both the nobles and the people, but, thought Hazlitt, he was biased somewhat in favour of the nobility, leading him to gloss over their defects more so than those of the common people.

But Hazlitt goes further, to develop an idea that only much later was seen to have radical implications for literary theory: he claims that it is of the very nature of poetry to glorify the aristocrat, the solitary hero, and the monarch, while being much less suited to represent, in ways that capture the imagination, the social problems of the common people. Poetic "imagination naturally falls in with the language of power. The imagination is an exaggerating and exclusive faculty: it takes from one thing to add to another: it accumulates circumstances together to give the greatest possible effect to a favourite object." On the other hand, the language that would be used to argue the cause of the people relies more on "the understanding", which "is a dividing and measuring faculty: it judges of things not according to their immediate impression on the mind, but according to their relations to one another. [...] Poetry [on the other hand] is right-royal. It puts the individual for the species, the one above the infinite many, might before right."

"So we feel some concern for the poor citizens of Rome when they meet together to compare their wants and grievances, till Coriolanus comes in and with blows and big words drives this set of 'poor rats,' this rascal scum, to their homes and beggary before him. There is nothing heroical in a multitude of miserable rogues not wishing to be starved [...] but when a single man comes forward to brave their cries and to make them submit to the last indignities, from mere pride and self-will, our admiration of his prowess is immediately converted into contempt for their pusillanimity." The key for Hazlitt is the innate human "love of power". This love of power is not necessarily expressed by a will to dominate others physically; but there is at least the tendency to side with power in the imagination, to be swayed and carried away emotionally by the power of poetic language. Hazlitt's own worship of Napoleon, it was later observed, could be taken as an example of this tendency.

Hazlitt for the most part agreed with his contemporary Romantics that poetry can make us better human beings. The following year, in his Lectures on the English Poets, referring to tragic poetry especially, he would observe how "in proportion as it sharpens the edge of calamity and disappointment, it strengthens the desire of good." Yet, he remained alert to ways in which poetry can also express and reinforce our less admirable tendencies. Following an observation of Burke he notes that "people flock to see a tragedy; but if there were a public execution in the next street, the theatre would very soon be empty. [...] We are [...] fond of indulging our violent passions [....] We cannot help it. The sense of power is as strong a principle in the mind as the love of pleasure."

Alarmingly, this tendency, as shown in Coriolanus, could seem to so glorify tyranny and oppression as to lead people to accept it in practice:

The whole dramatic moral of Coriolanus is that those who have little shall have less, and that those who have much shall take all that others have left. The people are poor; therefore they ought to be starved. They are slaves; therefore they ought to be beaten. They work hard; therefore they ought to be treated like beasts of burden. They are ignorant; therefore they ought not to be allowed to feel that they want food, or clothing, or rest, that they are enslaved, oppressed, and miserable. This is the logic of the imagination and the passions; which seek to aggrandise what excites admiration and to heap contempt on misery, to raise power into tyranny, and to make tyranny absolute; to thrust down that which is low still lower, and to make wretches desperate: to exalt magistrates into kings, kings into gods; to degrade subjects to the rank of slaves, and slaves to the condition of brutes. The history of mankind is a romance, a mask, a tragedy, constructed upon the principles of poetical justice; it is a noble or royal hunt, in which what is sport to the few is death to the many, and in which the spectators halloo and encourage the strong to set upon the weak, and cry havoc in the chase though they do not share in the spoil. We may depend upon it that what men delight to read in books, they will put in practice in reality.

In this way Hazlitt demonstrated how poetry might be used to glorify tyranny and oppression, a tendency he saw disturbingly prominent in Coriolanus. A lifelong advocate of individual freedom and the cause of the people as against the oppression of aristocracy, the tyranny of "legitimate" monarchy, Hazlitt was disturbed by this tendency in the human imagination as expressed in poetry, and it was here that these misgivings first entered into his general theory of poetry. These thoughts were not particularly noticed for a century and a half, when critic John Kinnaird pointed out how curiously at odds with the more typical critical theories of poetry Hazlitt's idea was, setting him apart from contemporaries such as Wordsworth and Coleridge: "Students of Hazlitt's thought have strangely neglected this passage, yet the idea it introduces is perhaps the most original, and surely the most heretical, idea in the entire range of his criticism." Kinnaird notes that Lionel Trilling was the first critic to grasp the "originality and importance of this passage", though even Trilling interpreted Hazlitt's idea of the human love of power in too narrow a sense.

Having observed the workings of what he thought an alarming tendency of the poetic imagination, as well as Shakespeare's possible aristocratic bias, Hazlitt then observes that, after all, traits of Coriolanus's character emerge, even in this dramatic context, that Shakespeare clearly shows to be less than admirable. For example, "Coriolanus complains of the fickleness of the people: yet, the instant he cannot gratify his pride and obstinacy at their expense, he turns his arms against his own country. If his country was not worth defending, why did he build his pride in its defence?"

Ultimately, Hazlitt tried to form a balanced judgement of the play. Comparing Hazlitt's account with that of a famous contemporary, David Bromwich thought that nothing like this critical stance can "be found anywhere in the whole range of Coleridge's criticism."

=== Falstaff (Henry IV and The Merry Wives of Windsor) ===
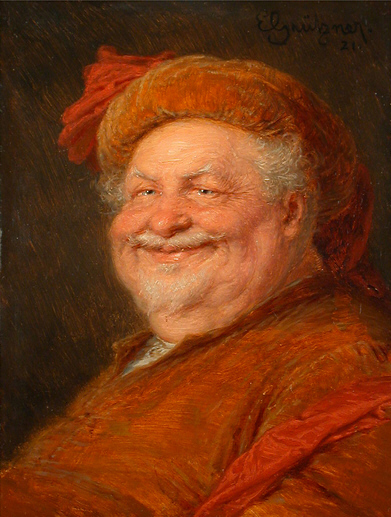
Falstaff by Eduard von Grützner

The character of Sir John Falstaff appeared in three of Shakespeare's plays, Henry IV, Part 1, Henry IV, Part 2, and The Merry Wives of Windsor. The bulk of Hazlitt's commentary on the two history plays is devoted to Falstaff, whom he considers to be "perhaps the most substantial comic character ever invented".

Falstaff had been of interest to Shakespearean commentators for years. Forty years earlier, a full-length book had appeared, An Essay on the Dramatic Character of Sir John Falstaff (1777), by Maurice Morgann, often taken as the beginning of that school of Shakespearean criticism which considers the characters of Shakespeare's plays as though they were real people. Hazlitt, who seems to have had little acquaintance with Morgann's work, is careful never to lose sight of Falstaff's status as a character in a play—three plays, in fact, though the two parts of Henry IV are examined in a single essay.

In conveying his impressions of Falstaff, Hazlitt first emphasises the sheer physical bulk that we remember him by: "We are as well acquainted with his person as his mind, and his jokes come upon us with double force and relish from the quantity of flesh through which they make their way, as he shakes his fat sides with laughter [...].

Then Hazlitt observes the connection between Falstaff's body and his "wit": "Falstaff's wit is an emanation of a fine constitution; an exuberance of good-humour and good-nature; an overflowing of his love of laughter and good fellowship; a giving vent to his heart's ease, and over-contentment with himself and others."

Answering those who consider Falstaff a "mere sensualist", he points out how little we actually see Falstaff indulging himself. "All this is as much in imagination as in reality. His sensuality does not engross and stupify his other faculties [...]. His imagination keeps up the ball after his senses have done with it. He seems to have even a greater enjoyment of the freedom from restraint, of good cheer, of his ease, of his vanity, in the ideal exaggerated description he gives of them, than in fact."

This leads Hazlitt to consider why, when Falstaff "is represented as a liar, a braggart, a coward, a glutton, etc., [...] we are not offended but delighted with him [...]." The answer is that "he is all these as much to amuse others as to gratify himself. He openly assumes all these characters to shew the humourous part of them. The unrestrained indulgence of his own ease, appetites, and convenience, has neither malice nor hypocrisy in it. In a word, he is an actor in himself almost as much as upon the stage, and we no more object to the character of Falstaff in a moral point of view than we should think of bringing an excellent comedian, who should represent him to the life, before one of the police offices."

Hazlitt goes on to present extracts of his favourite scenes, including those between Falstaff and Prince Hal, and Falstaff and Mistress Quickly. This is merged into a consideration of the way Falstaff interacts with some other characters, and the way Shakespeare's characters reflect on one another, each in his or her behaviour shedding light on key traits in the others.

This in turn leads to commentary on the "heroic and serious parts of" Henry IV, parts 1 and 2, and, finally, to more general reflections on Shakespeare's genius. But the character of Falstaff has had the lion's share of the discussion, and Hazlitt ends his essay on the two history plays by balancing his personal feelings about Falstaff with a more distanced, objective comment on the dramas as history plays in a broader context:

"The truth is, that we never could forgive the Prince's treatment of Falstaff [...]" by banishing him after the Prince has become King Henry V, "though perhaps Shakespear knew what was best, according to the history, the nature of the times, and of the man."

Hazlitt's enthusiastic explanation of how Falstaff's fatness contributes to our amused sympathy with him was later especially admired by the critic John Dover Wilson. And John Kinnaird considered the "sketch of Falstaff" in this essay to be a "masterpiece", "a brilliant [...] portrait of comic exuberance incarnate", though perhaps in part a creation of his own imagination rather than being entirely faithful to the character as created by Shakespeare. More recently the critic Harold Bloom, in a book devoted entirely to Falstaff, approvingly noted Hazlitt's appreciative commentary on the character, quoting Hazlitt's observation that Falstaff "lives in a perpetual holiday and open house, and we live with him in a round of invitations to a rump and dozen."

Falstaff's appearance in The Merry Wives of Windsor is far less significant; although he found things to admire in this play, to Hazlitt, "Falstaff in the Merry Wives of Windsor is not the man he was in the two parts of Henry IV."

=== Hamlet ===
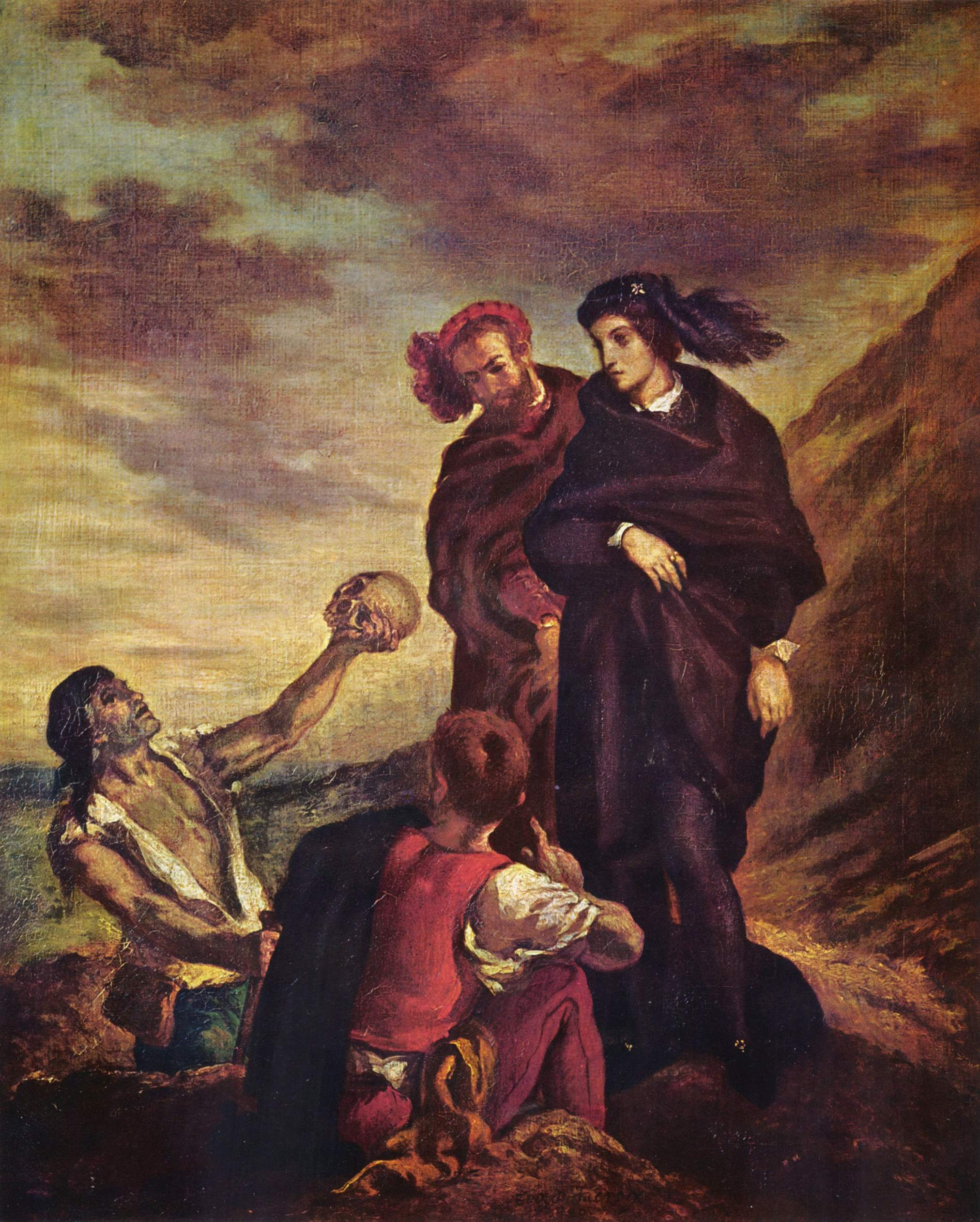
Hamlet and Horatio in the Graveyard by Eugène Delacroix. 19th-century depiction of Hamlet

Though at times Hazlitt delighted in actors' interpretations of Shakespearean characters, and he thought some of Shakespeare's plays eminently suited for the stage, he opens the chapter on Hamlet by proclaiming, "We do not like to see our author's plays acted, and least of all, Hamlet". Here, more than anywhere else, he sides with Charles Lamb in believing Shakespeare's plays to suffer in stage presentation. Neither John Kemble nor his favourite actor Edmund Kean played the role of Hamlet to his satisfaction. "Mr. Kean's Hamlet is as much too splenetic and rash as Mr. Kemble's is too deliberate and formal." This, he felt, is a play to be read, and he noted that by his time it had already been so often read as to have become part of the common culture. "This is that Hamlet the Dane, whom we read of in our youth". One might say, he observes, that Hamlet is just a character in a play: "Hamlet is a name; his speeches and sayings but the idle coinage of the poet's brain." Yet Shakespeare gives those sayings a reality in the mind of the reader, making them "as real as our own thoughts."

Of all Shakespeare's plays, this one is "the most remarkable for the ingenuity, originality, and unstudied developement of character", writes Hazlitt. He thought of Hamlet more often than any of Shakespeare's other plays because "it abounds most in striking reflections on human life, and because the distresses of Hamlet are transferred, by the turn of his mind, to the general account of humanity."

"The character of Hamlet [...] is not a character marked by strength of will or even of passion, but by refinement of thought and sentiment", writes Hazlitt, and he sides with Schlegel and Coleridge in thinking that Hamlet "seems incapable of deliberate action". "His ruling passion is to think, not to act".

Although the focus in this essay is largely on the character of Prince Hamlet, Hazlitt also comments on the movement of the dramatic action. Shakespeare lends all the characters and settings an air of verisimilitude, so that the reader might consider "the whole play [to be] an exact transcription of what might be supposed to have taken place at the court of Denmark, at the remote period of time fixed upon, before the modern refinements in morals and manners were heard of. [...] the characters think and speak and act just as they might do, if left entirely to themselves. There is no set purpose, no straining at a point."

Hazlitt also reflects on Shakespeare's thorough understanding of the complexity of human character. Queen Gertrude, "who was so criminal in some respects [was] not without sensibility and affection in other relations of life." Again, he comments on the idea expressed by other critics that some characters are too inconsistent in their behaviour to be plausible, particularly Polonius. If "his advice to [his son] Laertes is very excellent, and his advice to the King and Queen on the subject of Hamlet's madness very ridiculous", that is "because [Shakespeare] kept up the distinction which there is in nature, between the understandings and the moral habits of men. [...] Polonius is not a fool, but he makes himself so."

Hazlitt's essay on Hamlet was later used by David Bromwich in an extensive comparison of Coleridge's and Hazlitt's critical views in general. Although, to Bromwich, Coleridge's criticism of Hamlet contained a greater number of original ideas, including the general assessment of Prince Hamlet's character, Hazlitt's view is notable in that it does not, like Coleridge, reduce that character to a single dominating flaw, his inability to act. In one of his lectures on Shakespeare, Coleridge claimed that "Shakespeare wished to impress upon us the truth that action is the chief end of existence—that no faculties of intellect, however brilliant, can be considered valuable, or indeed otherwise than as misfortunes, if they withdraw us from or render us repugnant to action, and lead us to think and think of doing, until the time has elapsed when we can do anything effectually." Hazlitt, on the other hand, instead of applying this moral, pointed to the necessity of each reader's identifying with Hamlet to understand him (which, he believed, occurred more readily than with any other of Shakespeare's characters) and the reader's judging of Hamlet in part on the basis of what that reader then saw in himself. This made it unlikely that Hamlet's entire character would be reduced to a single flaw that would provide the reader with a moral lesson.

Shakespeare did not force Prince Hamlet to conform to any particular rules of morality. "The moral perfection of this character has been called in question", Hazlitt writes, but "the ethical delineations of [Shakespeare] do not exhibit the drab-coloured quakerism of morality." Hazlitt understood that human character is too complicated for such a portrayal to conform to the truth of human nature. "On the morality of literature", observes Bromwich, "Coleridge will usually be found a resolute guide, and Hazlitt an unsettling observer."

John Kinnaird also paid particular attention to Hazlitt's "celebrated" sketch of Prince Hamlet in this essay. Although Hazlitt does not entirely belong to the school of pure "character" critics, this essay does tend to be more of a "character" criticism than others, asserts Kinnaird, because Hazlitt shared with his Romantic contemporaries an "ambivalence toward tragedy". Hamlet to him as to his contemporaries was a modern character who was "obsessed with evil in the world[,] [...] long[ed] to escape from knowledge of it in themselves [and had a] pessimistic sense that suffering changes nothing and that the world must go on as it is." Thus, Hazlitt could declare, "It is we who are Hamlet."

Hazlitt incorporated into this chapter material from his review of Kean's performance of Hamlet at Drury Lane on 12 March 1814 ("Mr. Kean's Hamlet", The Morning Chronicle, 14 March 1814). That review already included Hazlitt's musings on the difficulty of presenting Hamlet on stage, after seeing how even his favourite Kean failed to interpret Hamlet's character adequately. The celebrated passages that begin with "This is that Hamlet the Dane" and include the assertion "It is we who are Hamlet" appear, however, only in the final form of the essay in Characters of Shakespear's Plays.

=== King Lear ===
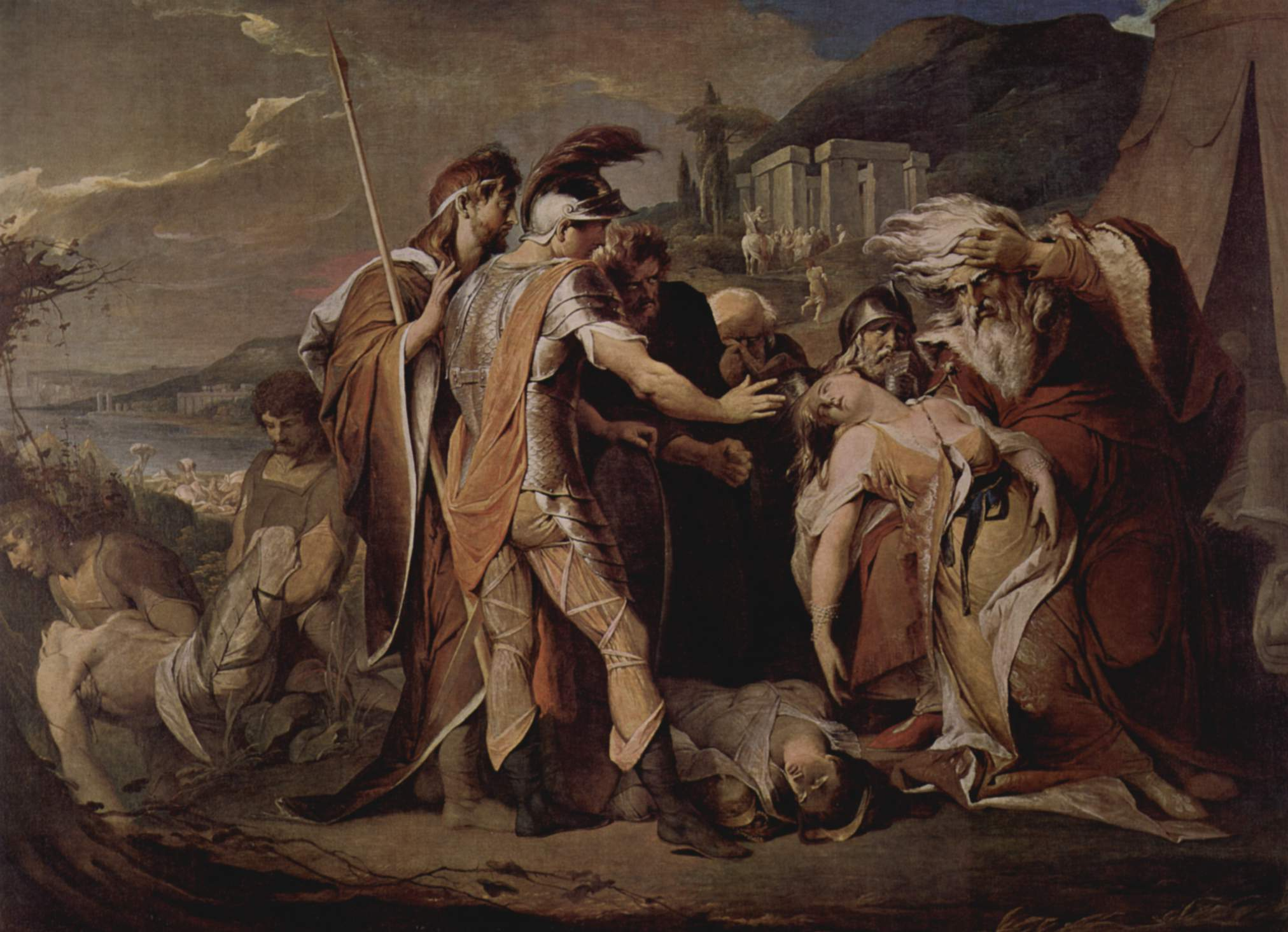
18th-century depiction of King Lear mourning over his daughter Cordelia

In the essay on King Lear, which he entitled simply "Lear", Hazlitt makes no references to the performances of any actors. In fact, here he fully agrees with Lamb that King Lear, like Hamlet, cannot be adequately presented on stage. No actors, he felt, could do justice to the overwhelming imaginative power of this play.

Hazlitt was so deeply affected by this tragedy that he begins the chapter with a regret that he had to write about it at all. "To attempt to give a description of the play itself or its effect upon the mind, is mere impertinence". Yet what he did write turned out to be a major piece of literary criticism that contributed to his general concepts about tragedy and poetry, and made a powerful impression on the poet John Keats.

"The greatest strength of genius", Hazlitt writes, "is shewn in describing the strongest passions". This play takes as its subject the strongest passions, and Shakespeare's genius rose to the occasion. Here, Shakespeare was more "in earnest" than in any of his other creations, and "he was fairly caught in the web of his own imagination". The result was his best tragedy, and therefore his best play.

Of King Lear in general, Hazlitt writes:

The passion which he has taken as his subject is that which strikes its root deepest into the human heart [...] This depth of nature, this force of passion, this tug and war of the elements of our being, this firm faith in filial piety, and the giddy anarchy and whirling tumult of the thoughts at finding this prop failing it, the contrast between the fixed, immovable basis of natural affection, and the rapid, irregular starts of imagination, suddenly wrenched from all its accustomed holds and resting-places in the soul, this is what Shakespear has given, and what nobody else but he could give.

Some space is devoted to the psychological scrutiny of the principal characters, but with consideration, also, of their function in the dramatic construct. "The character of Lear" is perfectly conceived for its place in the play, "the only ground on which such a story could be built with the greatest truth and effect. It is his rash haste, his violent impetuosity, his blindness to every thing but the dictates of his passions or affection, that produces all his misfortunes, that aggravates his impatience of them, that enforces our pity for him."

Hazlitt then comments on some of the other characters seen not in isolation but as they interact with and affect one another, comparing and contrasting them to highlight subtle differences. For example, the characters of Goneril and Regan, the comparison of which he begins with a note of personal distaste ("they are so thoroughly hateful that we do not even like to repeat their names"), are shown, he points out, partly in their reaction to their sister Cordelia's desire that they treat their father well—"'Prescribe not to us our duties'"—and partly by the contrast of their hypocrisy with the candour of the otherwise evil Edmund.

Hazlitt lingers briefly on the character of Lear's third daughter, Cordelia, observing, in one of his psychological asides, that "the indiscreet simplicity of her love [...] has a little of her father's obstinacy in it".

Going beyond specific characters, or even specific interactions among them, Hazlitt delineates what he calls the "logic of passion", the rhythm of emotions in the drama, and its effect on the mind of the reader or viewer. "We see the ebb and flow of the feeling, its pauses and feverish starts, its impatience of opposition, its accumulating force when it has had time to recollect itself, the manner in which it avails itself of every passing word or gesture, its haste to repel insinuation, the alternate contraction and dilatation of the soul, and all 'the dazzling fence of controversy' in this mortal combat with poisoned weapons, aimed at the heart, where each wound is fatal." He observes, too, in explaining an instance of what later came to be called comic relief, how when the reader's feelings are strained to the utmost, "just as [...] the fibres of the heart [...] are growing rigid from over-strained excitement [...] [t]he imagination is glad to take refuge in the half-comic, half-serious comments of the Fool, just as the mind under the extreme anguish of a surgical operation vents itself in sallies of wit."

And again, on Shakespeare's artistry, Hazlitt remarks on the way the second plot, involving Gloucester, Edgar, and Edmund, is interwoven with the main plot: "Indeed, the manner in which the threads of the story are woven together is almost as wonderful in the way of art as the carrying on the tide of passion, still varying and unimpaired, is on the score of nature."

Hazlitt appreciatively quotes long extracts from what he considered some of the best scenes, and remarks that, as sad as the concluding events are, "The oppression of the feelings is relieved by the very interest we take in the misfortunes of others, and by the reflections to which they give birth." This leads to his mentioning the then-current practice of substituting, on stage, a happy ending for Shakespeare's tragic one, which had been approved by no less an authority than Dr. Johnson. Arguing against this practice, Hazlitt brings in a lengthy quote from an article Lamb wrote for Leigh Hunt's Reflector, which concludes: "A happy ending!—as if the living martyrdom that Lear had gone through,—the flaying of his feelings alive, did not make a fair dismissal from life the only decorous thing for him."

Hazlitt, however, in the view of John Kinnaird, goes beyond Lamb in maintaining that it is Lear's very despair, by which "all the powers of thought and feeling" were elicited and intensified, that gives him tragic "strength and grandeur".

By early 1818, a few months after the publication of Characters of Shakespear's Plays, John Keats had acquired a copy. Fascinated by what he read, particularly by the essay on King Lear, he underlined passages and added comments in the margins. Keats especially liked what Hazlitt wrote on the play's "ebb and flow of the feeling" and noted, using a term he had heard Hazlitt himself apply to Shakespeare in his 27 January lecture "On Shakspeare and Milton", "This passage has to a great degree hieroglyphic visioning." Together with what he had already read of Hazlitt's work, especially the essay "On Gusto" from The Round Table, which had helped him develop his celebrated idea about "Negative Capability", this essay on King Lear inspired much of his own poetry and thoughts about poetry.

Hazlitt ends the chapter by making four points about genius, poetry, and especially tragedy. To David Bromwich the most important of these is the third, "That the greatest strength of genius is shewn in describing the strongest passions: for the power of the imagination, in works of invention, must be in proportion to the force of the natural impressions, which are the subject of them."

Bromwich noted that Hazlitt's thoughts, particularly as applied to Lear, are here in line with those of Shelley in his Defence of Poetry. Bromwich also noted that for Hazlitt the power of this play is achieved by Shakespeare's unwillingness to soften the harshness of "nature", as expressed in Lear's halting, broken outcries, such as "I will have such revenges on you both, [Goneril and Regan]/That all the world shall——". This approach is never quite followed by even so great a contemporary poet as Wordsworth. To Hazlitt, this is a demonstration of why the greatest poetry of his own age failed to achieve the level of greatness that Shakespeare reached here. That King Lear is strongest in subordinating the artistry of dramatic poetry to the power of nature is also why its kind of poetry is superior to the more artificial kind produced by Pope.

=== Macbeth ===
Among Shakespeare's four principal tragedies, Macbeth, according to Hazlitt in this chapter, is notable for its wild extremes of action, its preponderance of violence, and its representation of "imagination" strained to the verge of the forbidden and the darker mysteries of existence. "This tragedy is alike distinguished for the lofty imagination it displays, and for the tumultuous vehemence of the action; and the one is made the moving principle of the other", Hazlitt writes. Macbeth "moves upon the verge of an abyss, and is a constant struggle between life and death. The action is desperate and the reaction is dreadful. [...] The whole play is an unruly chaos of strange and forbidden things, where the ground rocks under our feet."

Here again, Hazlitt is interested not merely in individual characters but in the character of the play as a whole, focusing especially on the supernatural underpinnings, with the prophecies of the three witches on the "blasted heath", with which Macbeth struggles, wrestling with his destiny, through to the play's tragic climax. Hazlitt is especially interested in the "design" of Macbeth, in its general mood, its "full poetic 'impression'", and in this, according to John Kinnaird, he anticipates the method of the twentieth-century Shakespearean critic G. Wilson Knight. "Shakespear", writes Hazlitt, "lost sight of nothing that could in any way give relief or heightening to his subject [...]."

Further noting Shakespeare's crafting of the play, Hazlitt points to fine touches at the beginning that contribute to a unified effect: "The wildness of the scenery, the sudden shifting of the situations and characters, the bustle, the expectations excited, [all] are equally extraordinary." "Shakespear", he writes, "excelled in the openings of his plays: that of Macbeth is the most striking of any."

He also, as in his essay on Hamlet, notes the realistic effect of Macbeth: "His plays have the force of things upon the mind. What he represents is brought home to the bosom as a part of our experience, implanted in the memory as if we had known the places, persons, and things of which he treats."

In considering the characters, Hazlitt emphasises the importance of their interaction, the way in which a major character's behaviour helps define that of another. This is especially true of Macbeth and Lady Macbeth, locked together in a struggle against all Scotland and their fate. Macbeth, as he is about to commit his bloodiest deeds, is "assailed by the stings of remorse, and full of 'preternatural solicitings.' [...] In thought he is absent and perplexed, sudden and desperate in act, from his own irresolution." This is in contrast with, and "set off by" the character of "Lady Macbeth, whose obdurate strength of will and masculine firmness give her the ascendancy over her husband's faultering virtue. [...] The magnitude of her resolution almost covers the magnitude of her guilt." But in effect Macbeth and Lady Macbeth exchange places as the action develops. He "becomes more callous as he plunges deeper in guilt [...] and [...] in the end anticipates his wife in the boldness and bloodiness of his enterprises, while she for want of the same stimulus of action, [...] goes mad and dies."

Here as elsewhere, Hazlitt illuminates the characters not only by contrast with others in the same play but with characters in other plays. A lengthy passage, adapted from an 1814 drama review by Hazlitt, compares Macbeth and King Richard III from Shakespeare's play of that name. Both characters "are tyrants, usurpers, murderers, both aspiring and ambitious, both courageous, cruel, treacherous." But Richard is "naturally incapable of good" and "wades through a series of crimes [...] from the ungovernable violence of his temper and a reckless love of mischief", while Macbeth, "full of 'the milk of human kindness'", "is with difficulty prevailed upon to commit [...] the murder of Duncan" and is filled "with remorse after its perpetration."

Similarly, though Lady Macbeth is evil, "[s]he is only wicked to gain a great end" and it is only her "inexorable self-will" that prevents her being diverted from her "bad purpose" which masks her "natural affections"; whereas Goneril and Regan, in King Lear, "excite our loathing and abhorrence" as Lady Macbeth does not. Further, Hazlitt notes that Lady Macbeth displays human emotions, "swelling exultation and keen spirit of triumph, [...] uncontroulable eagerness of anticipation [...] solid, substantial flesh and blood display of passion"; while the witches from the same play are only "hags of mischief", "unreal, abortive, half-existences".

Because of their human qualities, we never entirely lose sympathy with Macbeth and Lady Macbeth, and our imagination participates with theirs in the tragedy. Their imagination makes the two more human and yet also destroys them. As Kinnaird points out (elaborating on an idea of Joseph W. Donohue Jr.), Hazlitt in part sees Macbeth as a tragedy of imagination itself.

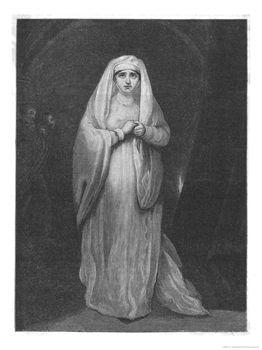
Sarah Siddons as Lady Macbeth; 1822 engraving by Robert Cooper, after a painting by George Henry Harlow

One concern addressed by Hazlitt is the assertion by previous critics that Macbeth is little more than a crude and violent amalgam of extremes filled with "Gothic" barbarisms. Hazlitt notes, however, that should anyone think Macbeth's character is so composed of contradictory extremes as to be implausible, it is, rather, the circumstances and the passions in conflict that provide the extremes, while Macbeth's character retains a strong underlying unity throughout. "Macbeth in Shakespear no more loses his identity of character in the fluctuations of fortune or the storm of passions than Macbeth in himself would have lost the identity of his person." Kinnaird notes that here, as if anticipating it by a century, Hazlitt argues against the view advanced by Elmer Edgar Stoll in 1933, that Macbeth's character is too full of contradictions to be plausible.

Although he lingers nostalgically on his memory of the great actress Sarah Siddons's performance as Lady Macbeth, and a few years earlier had acknowledged that Kean and John Kemble had been at least partly successful in the role of Macbeth (though each in different portions of it), on the whole he expressed doubts about the success of the staging of this play, again agreeing with Lamb. By the time he composed this chapter of Characters, he could write, "We can conceive [...] no one to play Macbeth properly, or to look like a man that had encountered the Weïrd Sisters." Further observations follow about the witches themselves. Part of the problem was that by his day, there remained few who really believed in the supernatural, and "by the force of the police and of philosophy [...] the ghosts in Shakespear will become obsolete." He concludes by quoting at length a passage from an essay by Lamb on the originality of Shakespeare's portrayal of the witches.

=== The Merchant of Venice ===
Hazlitt's treatment of The Merchant of Venice centres on the character of Shylock. A few years earlier, Edmund Kean had appeared as the Jewish moneylender in his debut performance at Drury Lane. Hazlitt, the drama critic for the Morning Chronicle in January 1814, sat close to the stage and watched every facial expression, every movement. He was astounded at Kean's, for the time, radically unconventional portrayal of Shylock as a full, rounded, complex human being, full of vigour, rather than a doddering, malevolent stereotype. His positive review of Kean's performance became critical in boosting the actor's career. But Kean's performance also helped alter Hazlitt's own view of Shylock, which made its way into this essay a few years later. Hazlitt admitted that he had tended to accept the older interpretation of Shylock's character as it had been depicted on stage, which followed centuries-old prejudices against the Jews, and made him a one-dimensional character. Kean's performance led him to study the play closely and think deeply about Shylock. Though Shylock's "mind is warped with prejudices and passion [...] that he has but one idea, is not true; he has more ideas than any other person in the piece; and if he is intense and inveterate in the pursuit of his purpose, he shews the utmost elasticity, vigour, and presence of mind, in the means of attaining it".

Although old prejudices against the Jews were starting to disappear, as Hazlitt notes (he refers to the portrayal of "the benevolent Jew" in Richard Cumberland's play The Jew of 1794), and some reviewers had begun to discover something respectable in Shylock's figure, a century and a half later critic David Bromwich would suggest that, in retrospect, it was Hazlitt himself, even more than Kean, who paved the way for what became the prevalent reading of Shylock's character. Though Shylock is serious about revenge, he is true to himself in other ways that cast a less than favourable light on other characters in the play. After Hazlitt's account, according to Bromwich, it became less easy to find a simple resolution to the problems in the play or to withhold entirely our sympathy for Shylock, particularly in view of a passage like the following:

Shylock is a good hater; "a man no less sinned against than sinning." If he carries his revenge too far, yet he has strong grounds for "the lodged hate he bears Anthonio", which he explains with equal force of eloquence and reason. He seems the depositary of the vengeance of his race; and though the long habit of brooding over daily insults and injuries has crusted over his temper with inveterate misanthropy, and hardened him against the contempt of mankind, this adds but little to the triumphant pretensions of his enemies. There is a strong, quick, and deep sense of justice mixed up with the gall and bitterness of his resentment. [...] The desire of revenge is almost inseparable from the sense of wrong; and we can hardly help sympathising with the proud spirit, hid beneath his "Jewish gaberdine", stung to madness by repeated undeserved provocations, and labouring to throw off the load of obloquy and oppression heaped upon him and all his tribe by one desperate act of "lawful" revenge, till the ferociousness of the means by which he is to execute his purpose, and the pertinacity with which he adheres to it, turn us against him; but even at last, when disappointed of the sanguinary revenge with which he had glutted his hopes, and exposed to beggary and contempt by the letter of the law on which he had insisted with so little remorse, we pity him, and think him hardly dealt with by his judges.

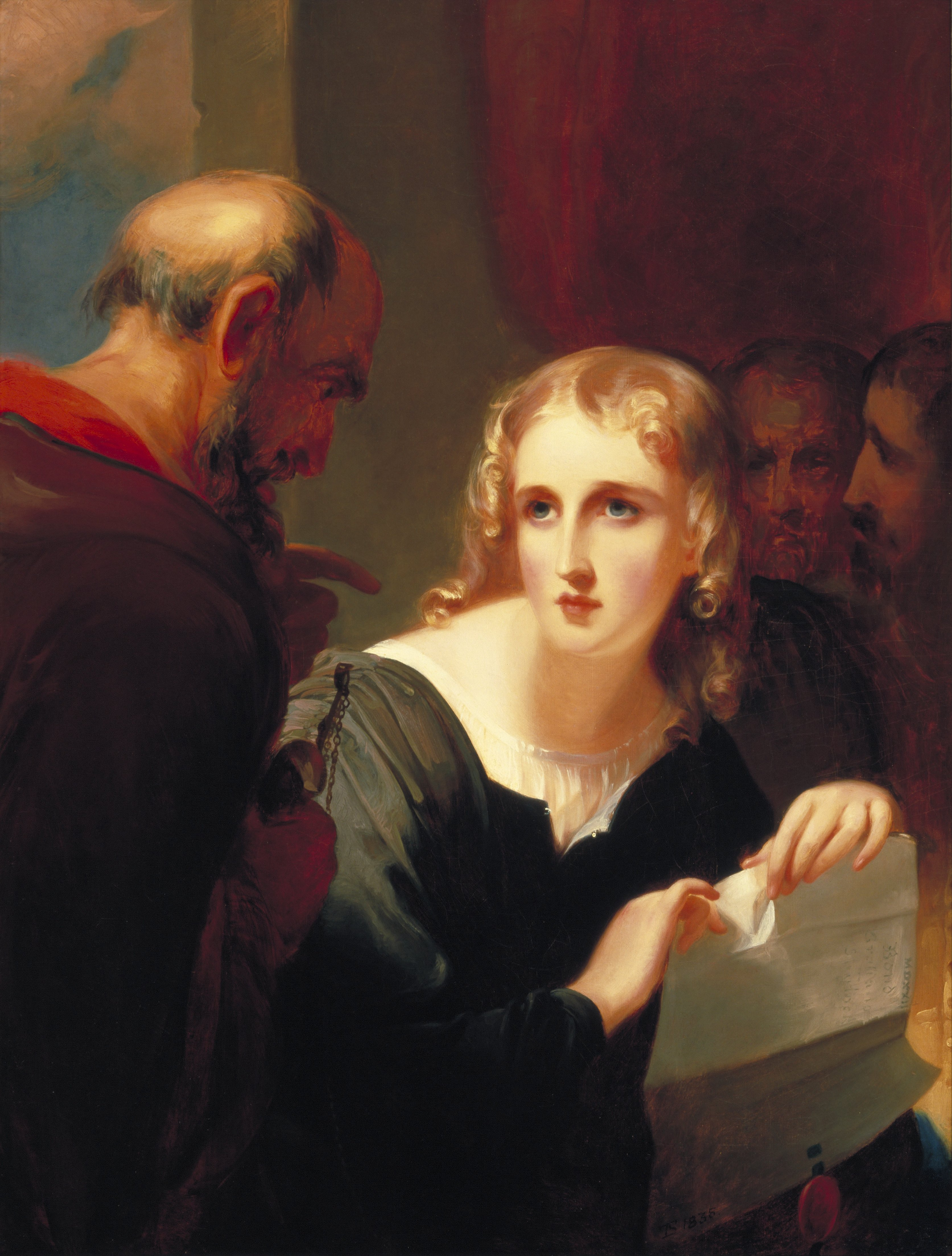
Shylock and Portia (1835)

Other critics even in later years insisted that the character of Shylock is that of an outsider separated from society, that the Jewish Shylock represented an older form of justice, meant to be supplanted by the Christian view, represented by Portia, who argued for the prevalence of mercy. Shylock, these critics maintained, must be removed in order to allow society to attain a Christian form of peace. Hazlitt's view, however, has remained as a valid countervailing concept of the play, one that does not arrive at easy conclusions or take sides readily.

Hazlitt also reflects on several other characters. Portia, for example, was no favourite of his, and "has a certain degree of affectation and pedantry about her". Gratiano he finds "a very admirable subordinate character".

Once again, as John Kinnaird observed, Hazlitt is here far more than a "character critic", showing serious interest in the structure of the play as a whole. "The whole of the trial-scene", he remarks in this essay, "is a master-piece of dramatic skill. The legal acuteness, the passionate declamations, the sound maxims of jurisprudence, the wit and irony interspersed in it, the fluctuations of hope and fear in the different persons, and the completeness and suddenness of the catastrophe, cannot be surpassed". He points to some beautiful poetic passages, and concludes that "the graceful winding up of this play [...] is one of the happiest instances of Shakespear's knowledge of the principles of the drama".

=== Othello ===
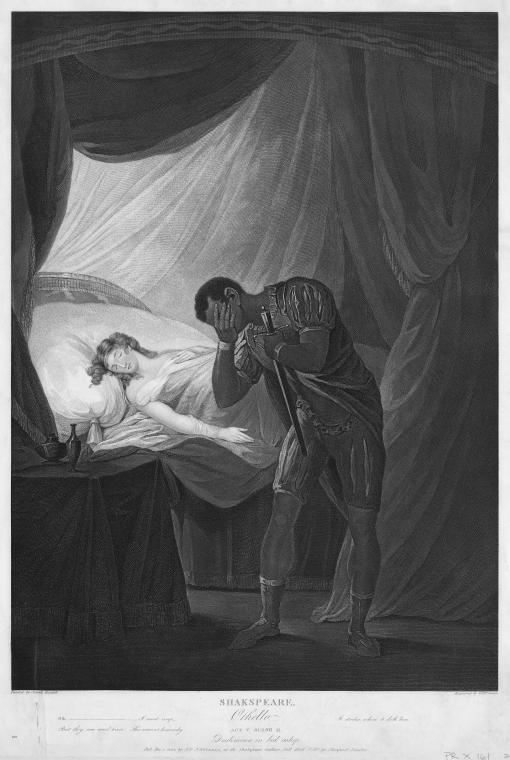
Early 19th-century depiction of Othello Act V, Scene 2

While Hazlitt's discussion of Othello includes observations about the characters, his consideration of this play, as with all of the four major tragedies, is combined with ideas about the purpose and value of tragedy and even of poetry in general. Expanding upon Aristotle's idea in the Poetics that "tragedy purifies the affections by terror and pity," he asserts that tragedy "makes us thoughtful spectators in the lists of life. It is the refiner of the species; a discipline of humanity."

Furthermore, Othello, more than the other tragedies, has for the average viewer or reader a "close[...] application" to the experiences of everyday life. Hazlitt brings out this point by comparing Othello to Macbeth, where "there is a violent struggle between opposite feelings, between ambition and the stings of conscience, almost from first to last: in Othello, the doubtful conflict between contrary passions, though dreadful, continues only for a short time, and the chief interest is excited by the alternate ascendancy of different passions, by the entire and unforeseen change from the fondest love and most unbounded confidence to the tortures of jealousy and the madness of hatred."

Hazlitt's discussion of the particular characters incorporates observations about the way Shakespeare creates them, showing that, rather than being broad types, characters even superficially similar differ in finely discriminated ways. Desdemona and Emilia, for example, are "to outward appearance, characters of common life, not more distinguished than women generally are, by difference of rank and situation." As the dialogue unfolds, "the difference of their thoughts and sentiments is however laid open, their minds are separated from each other by signs as plain and as little to be mistaken as the complexions of their husbands."

With all his frequently noted attention to character and characters—Hazlitt's partly psychological approach to character necessarily referred to observed real-life behavior—he also frequently emphasises the art by which Shakespeare created dramatic "character". Particularly in tragedy, a "sense of power", he believed, is the essential medium by which a poet of genius operates on the minds of his audience. When the author instills in the reader or viewer's imagination the sense of power that he must have had in grasping and conveying intertwined passions, he makes us identify with a character such as Othello, and feel in ourselves the way Iago plays upon his mind so that, ironically, his weakness is made to undermine his strength.

Hazlitt often focuses, as well, on specific traits by comparing the characters not to those of real life but to characters in Shakespeare's other plays, comparing, for example, Iago with Edmund in King Lear. His interest in the art of drama emerges even more obviously when he compares Iago with the villainous character Zanga in Edward Young's The Revenge (1721), still a popular play in Hazlitt's day.

For Hazlitt, Othello is especially notable for the interplay between the characters, and the way Shakespeare communicates the slow and gradual "movement of passion [...] the alternate ascendancy of different passions, [...] the entire and unforeseen change from the fondest love and most unbounded confidence to the tortures of jealousy and the madness of hatred." He finds especially remarkable the gradual alteration of Othello's feelings about Desdemona as his mind is played upon by Iago. Othello is not naturally a violent person in everyday life: "The nature of the Moor is noble, confiding, tender and generous; but his blood is of the most inflammable kind; and being once roused by a sense of his wrongs, he is stopped by no considerations of remorse or pity till he has given a loose to all the dictates of his rage and despair. [...] The third act of Othello is [Shakespeare's] finest display, not of knowledge and passion separately, but of the two combined." Hazlitt continues:

It is in working [Othello's] noble nature up to this extremity through rapid but gradual transitions, in raising passion to its height from the smallest beginnings and in spite of all obstacles, in painting the expiring conflict between love and hatred, tenderness and resentment, jealousy and remorse, in unfolding the strength and the weakness of our nature, in uniting sublimity of thought with the anguish of the keenest woe, in putting in motion the various impulses that agitate this our mortal being, and at last blending them in that noble tide of deep and sustained passion, impetuous but majestic [...] that Shakespear has shewn the mastery of his genius and of his power over the human heart.

Desdemona's character is shown in her attachment to her husband. "Her beauty and external graces are only indirectly glanced at." Her attachment to Othello begins in a manner "a little fantastical and headstrong." But after that her "whole character consists in having no will of her own, no prompter but her obedience." Even "the extravagance of her resolutions, the pertinacity of her affections, may be said to arise out of the gentleness of her nature."

Three years earlier, in the review "Mr. Kean's Iago" in The Examiner (7 August 1814), Hazlitt had ventured to speculate that Iago's suggestions of lasciviousness in Desdemona may have had some basis in truth, as "purity and grossness sometimes 'nearly are allied,/And thin partitions do their bounds divide.'" Although he omitted this thought from Characters of Shakespear's Plays, that did not stop an anonymous reviewer in Blackwood's Magazine from accusing him of calling Desdemona a "lewd" character. In "A Reply to 'Z'", written in 1818 but never published, Hazlitt answers his accuser: "It is not true that I have insinuated that Desdemona was a lewd woman, any more than Shakespear has insinuated it, but I have dared to say that he alone could have given additional elegance and even delicacy to a female character from the very disadvantageous circumstances in which Desdemona is placed."

Hazlitt's treatment of the character of Iago is written in part as a response to those who "thought this whole character unnatural, because his villainy is without a sufficient motive." Hazlitt responds with a psychological analysis that exerted great influence and sparked considerable discussion: Shakespeare "knew that the love of power, which is another name for the love of mischief, is natural to man. [...] He would know this [...] merely from seeing children paddle in the dirt or kill flies for sport. Iago in fact belongs to a class of character, common to Shakespear and at the same time peculiar to him; whose heads are as acute and active as their hearts are hard and callous. Iago is [...] an extreme instance of the kind: that is to say, of diseased intellectual activity, with the most perfect indifference to moral good or evil, or rather with a decided preference of the latter, because it falls more readily in with this favourite propensity, gives greater zest to his thoughts and scope to his actions." This interpretation was later admired and built upon by Shakespearean critic A.C. Bradley.

John Kinnaird later commented on Hazlitt's words terming Iago "an amateur of tragedy in real life", pointing out that Bradley and others after him developed the idea that Hazlitt saw Iago as an artist in his own right, "a dramatic artist manqué". "But the form Iago's will to 'mischief' takes is not primarily aesthetic or creative but practical and critical. Soldier that he is, he has a 'craving after action of the most difficult and dangerous kind,' and he has none of the artist's sympathy with pleasure; his 'licentious' bent is always 'saturnine,' and stems from 'a desire of finding out the worst side of every thing, and of proving himself an over-match for appearances' [...]". David Bromwich later warned against carrying too far the idea that Iago is an artist figure within the play, a representation of Shakespeare himself, as Iago's "genius is [...] the opposite of Shakespeare's. It presents all things in a distorting medium [...]. Iago's peculiar genius is" as Hazlitt represented it, "the exuberance of one part of Shakespeare's mind—not an allegorical representation of the whole of it."

=== The Tempest ===
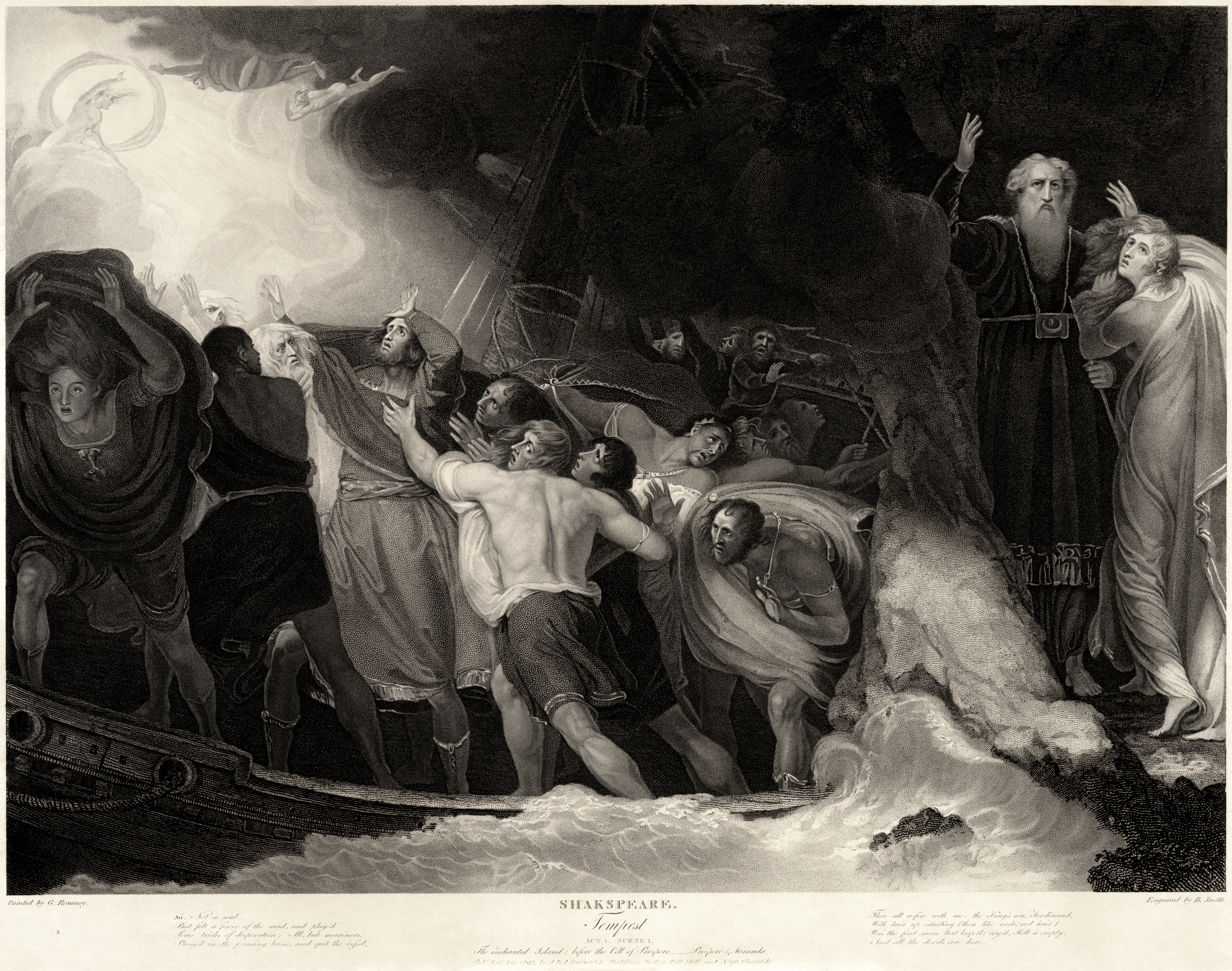
The Tempest Act I, Scene 1 (1797)

The Tempest, Hazlitt claims, is one of Shakespeare's "most original and perfect" plays, similar in some ways to A Midsummer Night's Dream but finer as a play, if not as rich in poetic passages. The Tempest demonstrates the author to be a master of both comedy and tragedy, with a full command over "all the resources of passion, of wit, of thought, of observation". Yet again, Hazlitt here devotes considerable space to not just the characters in the play, but the character of the play as a whole. The world of the play seems to be created out of nothing; yet, though dream-like, in large part a product of the imagination, its setting resembles that of a painting we may have seen—"Prospero's enchanted island [with its] airy music, the tempest-tost vessel, the turbulent waves, all have the effect of the landscape background of some fine picture"—its poetry having a music that conjures up meaning in the listener's mind—"the songs [...] without conveying any distinct images, seem to recall all the feelings connected with them, like snatches of half-forgotten music heard indistinctly and at intervals"—and its characters, many of whom, like Ariel, we know could not really exist, are drawn so as to seem "as true and natural as [Shakespeare's] real characters". All is so artfully unified that "that part which is only the fantastic creation of his mind, has the same palpable texture, and coheres 'semblably' with the rest."

Hazlitt provides brief appreciative sketches of many of the characters and their relationships. For example:

The courtship between Ferdinand and Miranda is one of the chief beauties of this play. It is the very purity of love. The pretended interference of Prospero with it heightens its interest, and is in character with the magician, whose sense of preternatural power makes him arbitrary, tetchy, and impatient of opposition.

In quoting the speech of the old counselor Gonzalo on the ideal commonwealth he would rule, Hazlitt observes that here "Shakespear has anticipated nearly all the arguments on the Utopian schemes of modern philosophy".

He scrutinises with special interest the characters of Caliban and Ariel, pointing out that, as they arise within the structure of the play, neither could exist without the other, and neither alone illuminates the sum of our nature better than both together. Caliban is gross, of the earth, whereas "Ariel is imaginary power, the swiftness of thought personified."

Shakespear has, as it were by design, drawn off from Caliban the elements of whatever is ethereal and refined, to compound them in the unearthly mould of Ariel. Nothing was ever more finely conceived than this contrast between the material and the spiritual, the gross and delicate.

Hazlitt was particularly interested in Caliban, in part because others thought the character vulgar or evil. Though he is a "savage", "half brute, half demon", and "the essence of grossness", Caliban is not in the least "vulgar". "The character grows out of the soil where it is rooted, uncontrouled, uncouth and wild, uncramped by any of the meannesses of custom [....] Vulgarity is not natural coarseness, but conventional coarseness, learnt from others, contrary to, or without an entire conformity of natural power and disposition; as fashion is the common-place affectation of what is elegant and refined without any feeling of the essence of it." Stephano and Trinculo are vulgar by comparison, and "in conducting [them] to Prospero's cell", by understanding the "nature" by which it is surrounded, "Caliban shews the superiority of natural capacity over greater knowledge and greater folly."

Casting a retrospective light on his interest in Caliban in Characters of Shakespear's Plays, the following year Hazlitt, in a review of "Mr. Coleridge's Lectures", responded indignantly to Coleridge's calling Caliban a "villain", as well as a "Jacobin", who wanted only to spread anarchy. Though speaking somewhat tongue-in-cheek, Hazlitt rises to Caliban's defence: "Caliban is so far from being a prototype of modern Jacobinism, that he is strictly the legitimate sovereign of the isle". Hazlitt did not necessarily believe that Caliban deserved to supplant Prospero as ruler, but he shows that Caliban's very existence raises questions about the fundamental nature of sovereignty, justice, and society itself. As noted by David Bromwich, Coleridge found reasons to apologise for society as it was. Hazlitt, on the other hand, refused to take sides, leaving as open questions the issues that emerged in the play. "It was left to Hazlitt to interpret Caliban's coarseness and the justice of his protests as both alike irreducible."

=== Twelfth Night; or, What You Will ===
Hazlitt's commentary on Twelfth Night uses Shakespeare's play to illustrate some of his general ideas about comedy, thoughts that he explored at greater length in later works, such as his Lectures on the English Comic Writers (1819).

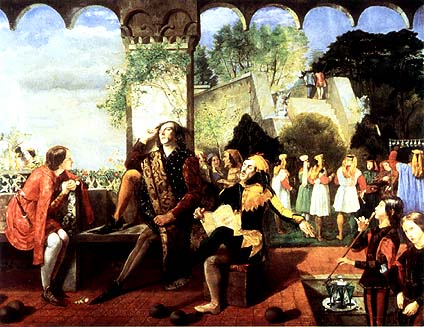
Walter Howell Deverell, Twelfth Night (1850)

Nobody, according to Hazlitt (voicing his disagreement with Dr. Johnson), excelled Shakespeare in tragedy; although his comedies could be first rate, other writers, such as Molière, Cervantes, and Rabelais, excelled him in some types of comedy. It was in the comedy of "Nature" that Shakespeare was supreme. This is not comedy that satirises the "ridiculous" but is rather the comedy of "convivial laughter", which gently mocks human foibles and invites us to share in innocent pleasures. Of this kind of comedy, Twelfth Night is "one of the most delightful". Unlike the "comedy of artificial life, of wit, of satire," Shakespeare's more gentle comedy "makes us laugh at the follies of mankind, not despise them [...]. Shakespear's comic genius resembles the bee rather in its power of extracting sweets from weeds or poisons, than in leaving a sting behind it."

Besides his further general remarks, Hazlitt lingers appreciatively over a number of amusing scenes and poetic passages, including the songs, all showing how "Shakespear's comedy is of a pastoral and poetical cast. Folly is indigenous to the soil [....] Absurdity has every encouragement afforded it; and nonsense has room to flourish in." Characters of vastly different types are all welcome and fit into his scheme: "the same house is big enough to hold Malvolio, the Countess, Maria, Sir Toby, and Sir Andrew Ague-cheek." He particularly admires the character of Viola, whom Shakespeare gives many speeches of "impassioned sweetness". Characterising the play as a whole by quoting the author's own words in it—"Shakespear alone could describe the effect of his own poetry."—he reflects that the play's poetry comes "'o'er the ear like the sweet south/That breathes upon a bank of violets,/Stealing and giving odour.'"

Here Hazlitt steps back to observe his own character, musing that if he himself were less "saturnine", he might well like the comedies as much as the tragedies, or at least that is how he feels, "after reading [...] parts of this play".

=== As You Like It ===
Although Hazlitt had seen As You Like It on stage, he remembered it most fondly from having read it so frequently that he practically had it memorised. In Characters of Shakespear's Plays, he makes no mention at all of any stage performances, treating the play as one primarily meant to be read. What strikes him as most notable about it is its character of a "pastoral drama", one that presents an "ideal" world—that is, a world of thought and imagination, not action. And though it is a comedy, its interest derives not so much from in our being made to laugh at any particular human follies, but rather, "more out of the sentiments and characters than out of the actions or situations. It is not what is done, but what is said, that claims our attention."

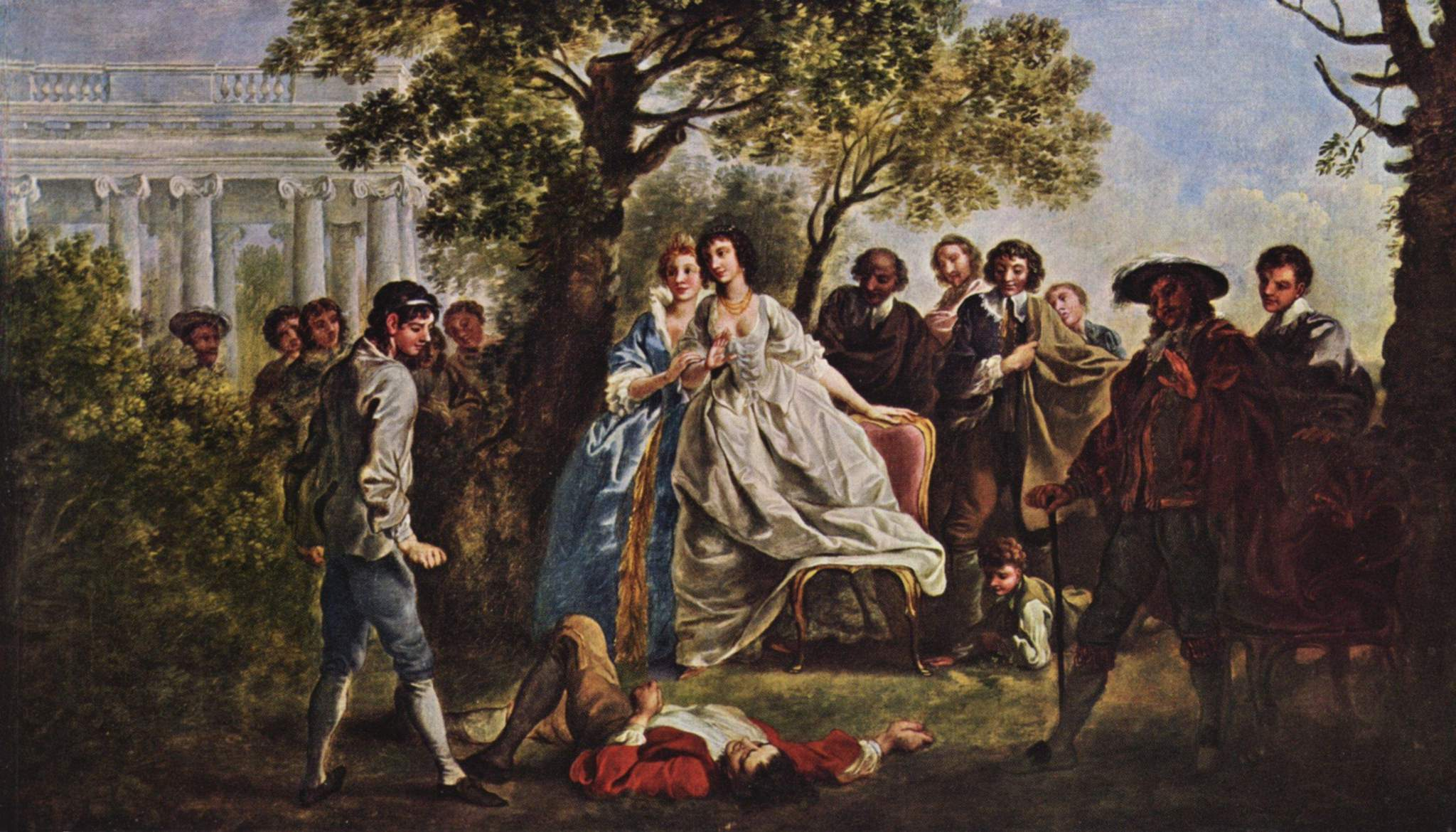
Scene from As You Like It (1750)

"The very air of the place", wrote Hazlitt about the Forest of Arden, "seems to breathe a spirit of philosophical poetry; to stir the thoughts, to touch the heart with pity, as the drowsy forest rustles to the sighing gale", and the character who most embodies the philosophical spirit of the place is Jacques, who "is the only purely contemplative character in Shakespear." Among the lovers, Hazlitt particularly likes the character of Rosalind, "made up of sportive gaiety and natural tenderness". And the couples, Touchstone and Audrey, and Silvius and Phebe, have their different places in the picture. The other characters, including Orlando and the Duke, also come in for their share of commentary. All in all, Hazlitt finds this to be one of the most quotable and quoted of Shakespear's plays: "There is hardly any of Shakespear's plays that contains a greater number of passages that have been quoted in books of extracts, or a greater number of phrases that have become in a manner proverbial."

Hazlitt's concept of the play as one in which the interest is intended to arise not out of the action or situation but rather its contemplative nature has remained a vital one, reaching into the twentieth century, and now the twenty-first.

=== Measure for Measure ===
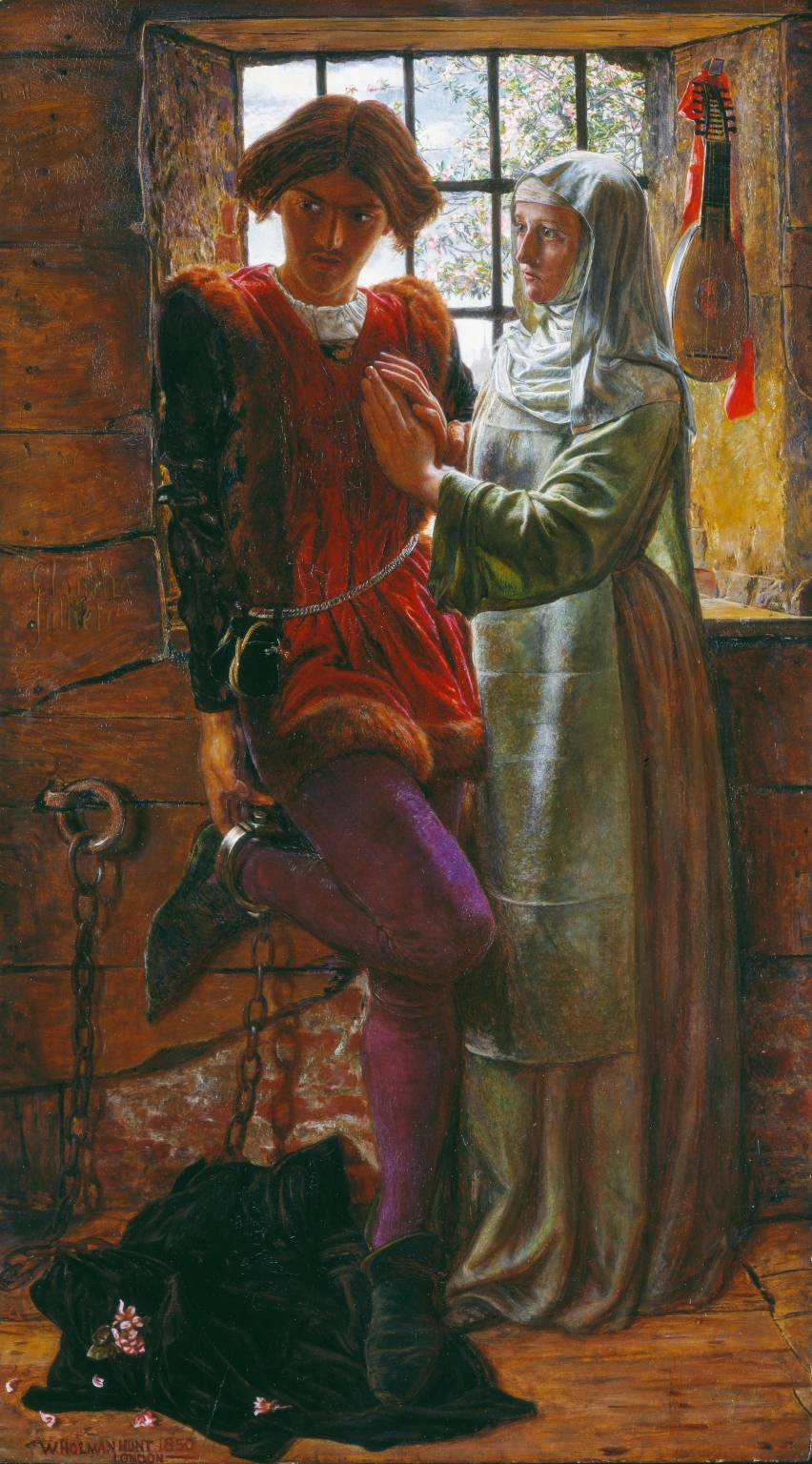
Claudio and Isabella (1850) by William Holman Hunt

Measure for Measure has frequently been considered a "problem play". It was a problem for Hazlitt in that it contains almost no character with whom one can feel complete sympathy. "[T]here is in general a want of passion; the affections are at a stand; our sympathies are reflected and defeated in all directions." Angelo, the Deputy ruler of Vienna, is forgiven by the Duke but draws only Hazlitt's hatred, as "he seems to have a much greater passion for hypocrisy than for his mistress." "Neither are we enamoured of Isabella's rigid chastity, though she could not act otherwise than she did." Isabella's brother Claudio "is the only person who feels naturally", yet even he does not show well in his pleading for life at the sacrifice of his sister's virginity. There is no easy solution for his plight, and "he is placed in circumstances of distress which almost preclude the wish for his deliverance." Over a century later, commentator R.W. Chambers placed Hazlitt as the first of a long line of notable Shakespearean critics who felt the same way, and he quoted Characters of Shakespear's Plays in establishing his contention (as a basis for arguing his own different view of the play) that Hazlitt was among the first of dozens of distinguished critics who could not comprehend how Mariana could love and plead for someone like Angelo, and in general showed a distaste for much in Measure for Measure.

Yet, unlike Coleridge, and despite his own reservations, Hazlitt found much to admire in Measure for Measure, a "play as full of genius as it is of wisdom." He quotes at length passages of "dramatic beauty", and also finds occasion to use this play as an example supporting his characterisation of the general nature of Shakespeare's genius, and the relation between morality and poetry. "Shakespear was in one sense the least moral of all writers; for morality (commonly so called) is made up of antipathies [...]". Yet "in another [sense] he was the greatest of all moralists. He was a moralist in the same sense in which nature is one. He taught what he had learnt from her. He shewed the greatest knowledge of humanity with the greatest fellow-feeling for it."

Although Hazlitt had reviewed a performance of Measure for Measure for The Examiner on 11 February 1816, and incorporated a few passages, with modifications, into this chapter, including some of his general philosophical reflections and a mention of some of Schlegel's opinions, yet he says nothing in Characters of Shakespear's Plays about any stage performances of this play.

=== Others ===
==== Tragedies ====
Hazlitt believed that because tragedy engages our emotions most profoundly, it is the greatest kind of drama. Of the tragedies based on Greek and Roman history, he ranked Julius Caesar beneath the other Roman tragedies, Coriolanus and Antony and Cleopatra. But, as elsewhere, he expresses admiration for the fine discrimination of character, the depiction of "the manners of the common people, and the jealousies and heart-burnings of the different factions" in Julius Caesar.

In Antony and Cleopatra, "Shakespear's genius has spread over the whole play a richness like the overflowing of the Nile". Overall, this play "presents a fine picture of Roman pride and Eastern magnificence: and in the struggle between the two, the empire of the world seems suspended, 'like the swan's down feather,/That stands upon the swell at full of tide,/And neither way inclines.'"

Timon of Athens, to Hazlitt "as much a satire as a play", seemed to him "to be written with as intense a feeling of his subject as any one play of Shakespear" and "is the only play of our author in which spleen is the predominant feeling of the mind."

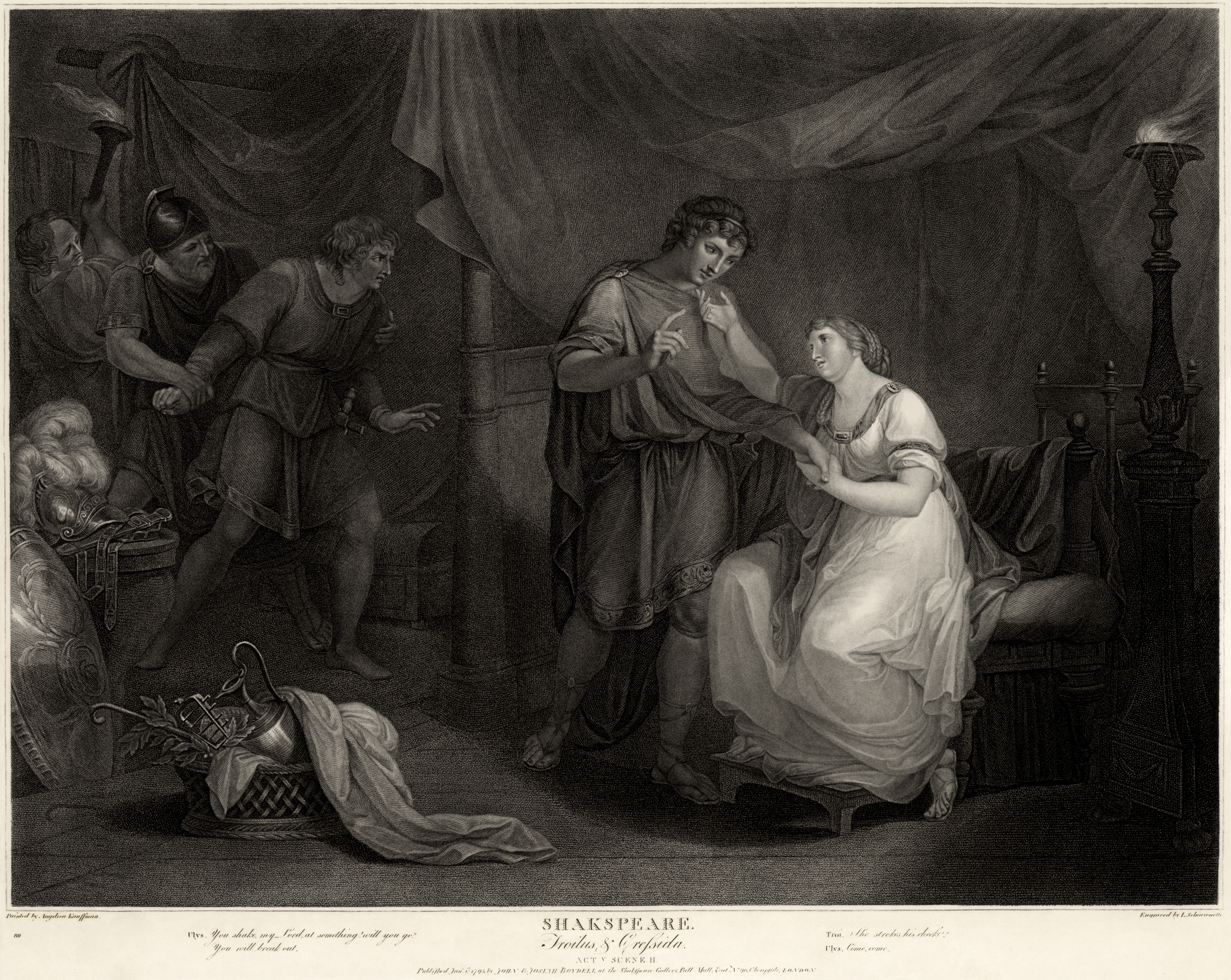
Troilus and Cressida, Act V, Scene II (1795)

A focal point of Hazlitt's account of Troilus and Cressida is a comparison of the characterisation in this play and that in Chaucer's poem Troilus and Criseyde (one of Shakespeare's sources). Chaucer's characters are full and well developed; but Chaucer unfolded each character in itself, one at a time. Shakespeare displayed characters as they see themselves as well as how others see them, and showed the effects each has on the others. Shakespeare's characters were so distinctive that it is as if each were expressed by a distinct "faculty" of his mind; and, in effect, these faculties could be viewed as showing "excessive sociability", notable for "how they gossiped and compared notes together." Twentieth-century critic Arthur Eastman thought that, although these remarks did insufficient justice to Chaucer, they were particularly original in revealing "the sophisticated genius of Shakespeare."

For Hazlitt, the essence of Romeo and Juliet is Shakespeare's portrayal of the love that comes with "the ripening of the youthful blood"; and with that love the imagination of the youthful lovers is stirred to dwell not so much on present pleasure but "on all the pleasures they had not experienced. All that was to come of life was theirs. [...] Their hopes were of air, their desires of fire." In many beautiful poetic passages, "the feelings of youth and of the spring are [...] blended together like the breath of opening flowers." Assessing the character of the play as a whole, he states: "This play presents a beautiful coup-d'oeil of the progress of human life. In thought it occupies years, and embraces the circle of the affections from childhood to old age."

==== Histories ====
In Hazlitt's commentary on King John, his last on any of the history plays, he offers his view of history plays in general: "If we are to indulge our imaginations, we had rather do it upon an imaginary theme; if we are to find subjects for the exercise of our pity and terror, we prefer seeking them in fictitious danger and fictitious distress."

Still, he finds much to appreciate in the history plays: here, it is the weak, vacillating, sometimes contemptible character of King John; the "comic" but forthright, noble character of Philip the Bastard; the desperation and excess of maternal tenderness in Constance; and many beautiful and affecting passages. Hazlitt also offers some reflections on Shakespeare's versification. There was some controversy over whether this play was genuinely Shakespeare's. He concludes that the verse shows that it certainly was, a judgement borne out by later critics.

Hazlitt remarks that Richard II, less well known than Richard III, is the finer play. Worth noting is the exchange of places between the King and Bolingbroke, the usurping king—"The steps by which Bolingbroke mounts the throne are those by which Richard sinks into the grave"— and he compares the manner and politics of the age with those of his own. Among various poetical passages, he finds the speech of John of Gaunt in praise of England, "one of the most eloquent that ever was penned."

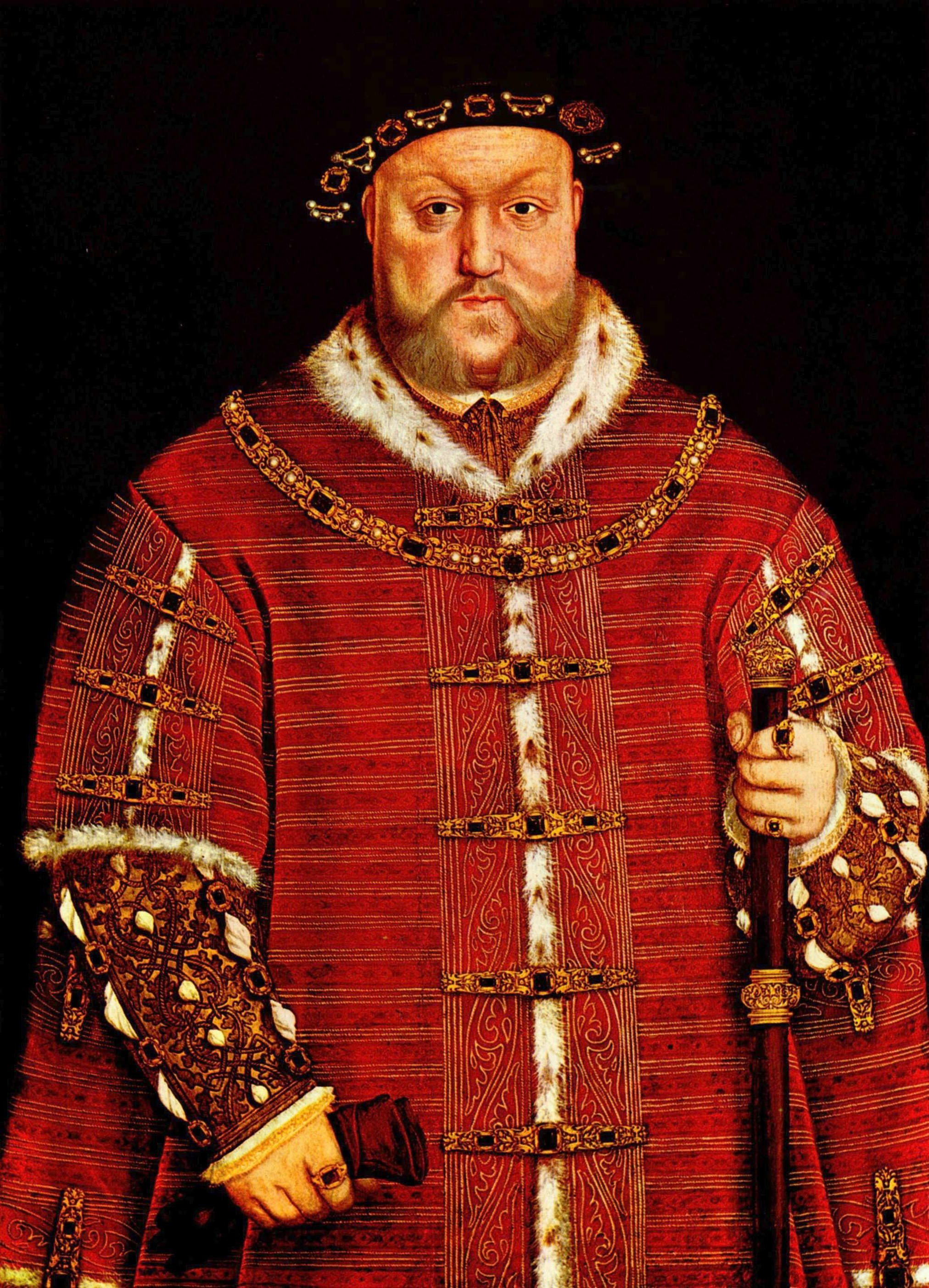
Porträt des Heinrich VIII (Henry VIII), after Hans Holbein the Younger, 1542.

Henry V Hazlitt thought only second-rate among Shakespeare's plays, yet filled with much fine poetry. Regarding the King himself, he considered the character of this "pageant" play entertaining enough, until one compares King Henry with the historical Henry V, who was as barbarous as any of the historical absolute monarchs.

Henry VI, the three parts considered together in one chapter, is not, for Hazlitt, on a level with the other history plays, but, in a long comparison of King Henry VI with King Richard II, he finds occasion to reinforce his major theme of the fine discrimination of superficially similar characters.

Richard III for Hazlitt is preeminently made for acting, "properly a stage play; it belongs to the theatre, rather than to the closet." It is dominated by the character of King Richard, whom Shakespeare portrays as

towering and lofty; equally impetuous and commanding; haughty, violent, and subtle; bold and treacherous; confident in his strength as well as in his cunning; raised high by his birth, and higher by his talents and his crimes; a royal usurper, a princely hypocrite, a tyrant, and a murderer of the house of Plantagenet.

Hazlitt comments on the efforts of several actors in playing the role, particularly Kean. Portions of his review of Kean's first performance as Richard, written for The Morning Chronicle of 15 February 1814, were incorporated into this chapter.

Differing with Dr. Johnson, who found nothing of genius in Henry VIII but the depiction of the "'meek sorrows and virtuous distress'" of Queen Katherine, Hazlitt finds in this play, though not one of Shakespeare's greatest, "considerable interest of a more mild and thoughtful cast, and some of the most striking passages in the author's works." In addition to the portrayal of Katherine, Hazlitt likes that of Cardinal Wolsey and of King Henry himself, which, though "drawn with great truth and spirit [is] like a very disagreeable portrait, sketched by the hand of a master." And "the scene of [the Duke of] Buckingham led to execution is one of the most affecting and natural in Shakespear, and one to which there is hardly an approach in any other author."

==== Comedies ====
Reflecting on Twelfth Night, Hazlitt considered that his own preference for tragedy could be in part due to his own "saturnine" temperament, and asserted that, regardless of individual preferences, Shakespeare was as skilled in comedy as in tragedy. With this acknowledgement, he had quite a few appreciative comments to make about the comedies.

Hazlitt found sheer delight in A Midsummer Night's Dream, especially relishing its playfully inventive poetry and quoting at length several of his favourite passages. He also considers how it exhibits the fine discrimination of character to be found everywhere in Shakespeare. As elsewhere, he crosses the boundaries of plays and enumerates subtle differences between even the fairy characters, in this case in an extensive comparison of Puck in this play and Ariel in The Tempest.

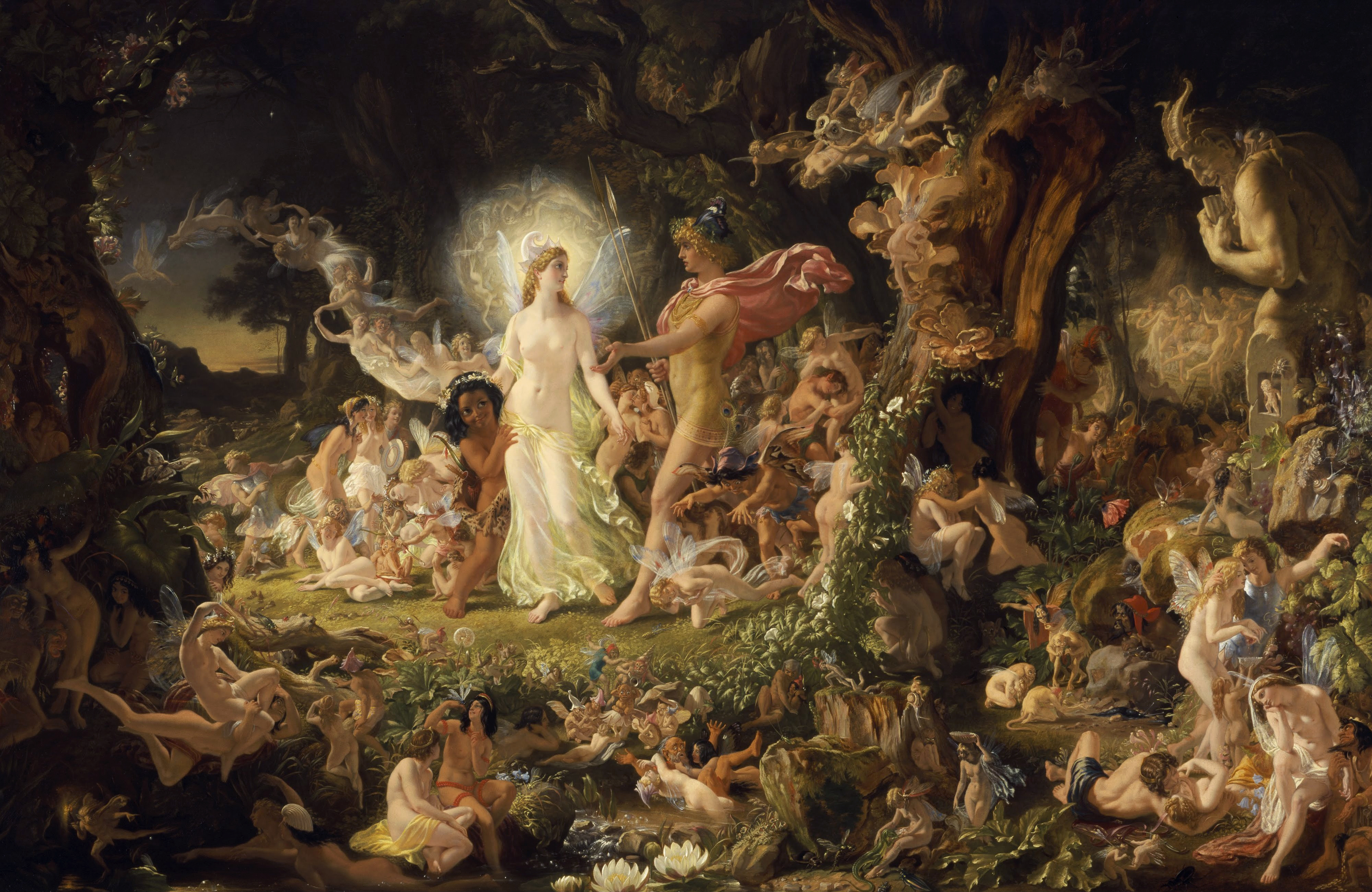
The Quarrel of Oberon and Titania by Joseph Noel Paton

This is one play that Hazlitt felt cannot be properly represented on stage. Its beauties are primarily those of poetry: "Poetry and the stage do not agree well together. The ideal can have no place upon the stage, which is a picture without perspective. [...] Where all is left to the imagination (as is the case in reading) every circumstance [...] has an equal chance of being kept in mind, and tells according to the mixed impression of all that has been suggested."

Although the early play The Two Gentlemen of Verona seemed to Hazlitt like "little more than the first outlines of a comedy loosely sketched in", he also found in it "passages of high poetical spirit, and of inimitable quaintness of humour".

Hazlitt proclaims The Winter's Tale as "one of the best-acting of our author's plays", and recalls with delight some of his favourite actors who played the parts, including Sarah Siddons and John Kemble. He notes the incisive psychology of the unfolding of King Leontes's madness, the appealing roguery of Autolycus, and the charm of Perdita's and Florizel's speeches, after wondering how it could be that Pope doubted the authenticity of the play as Shakespeare's.

Hazlitt thought All's Well that Ends Well to be a particularly "pleasing" play, though less as a comedy than as a serious dramatisation of an original tale by Boccaccio. Helena is a noble example of womanhood, and, in the comic part of the play, Hazlitt is especially amused by the character of Parolles, the "parasite and hanger on of [Count] Bertram's whose "folly, boasting, and cowardice [... and] false pretensions to bravery and honour" are unmasked in "a very amusing episode." The source of Shakespeare's play leads Hazlitt to digress at length on the writing of Boccaccio, who had never had "justice [...] done him by the world."

Love's Labour's Lost, thought Hazlitt, "transports us quite as much to the manners of the court, and the quirks of the courts of law, as to the scenes of nature or the fairy-land of [Shakespeare's] own imagination. Shakespear has set himself to imitate the tone of polite conversation then prevailing among the fair, the witty, and the learned". "If we were to part with any of the author's comedies", he writes, "it should be this." Yet he also mentions many amusing characters, dramatic scenes, and noble lines of poetry he would not willingly part with, quoting at length long passages spoken by both Biron and by Rosaline.

Much Ado About Nothing Hazlitt found to be an "admirable comedy", neatly balancing the comic against more serious matter. He reflects, "Perhaps that middle point of comedy was never more nicely hit in which the ludicrous blends with the tender, and our follies, turning round against themselves in support of our affections, retain nothing but their humanity."

The Taming of the Shrew Hazlitt sums up very simply as "almost the only one of Shakespear's comedies that has a regular plot, and downright moral [....] It shows admirably how self-will is only to be got the better of by stronger will, and how one degree of ridiculous perversity is only to be driven out by another still greater."

While The Comedy of Errors has a few passages "which bear the decided stamp of [Shakespeare's] genius", Hazlitt for the most part characterises it as "taken very much from the Menaechmi of Plautus, and is not an improvement on it."

Hazlitt ends his detailed account of the plays with a chapter on "Doubtful Plays of Shakespear", the greater part of which consists of direct quotations from Schlegel, whose remarks Hazlitt finds worth considering, if he does not always agree with them. Most of the plays now accepted as Shakespeare's, or at least partly by Shakespeare, were also accepted as his by Hazlitt. The two notable exceptions were Titus Andronicus and Pericles, Prince of Tyre. Of the former, Hazlitt nevertheless respected Schlegel's defence of it enough to quote the latter at length. And he allows that some parts of Pericles could have been by Shakespeare but more likely were "imitations" of Shakespeare "by some contemporary poet."

Hazlitt felt compelled to add to his commentary on the plays some words on Shakespeare's nondramatic poetry, in the chapter "Poems and Sonnets". While he liked a few of the sonnets, for the most part Hazlitt found Shakespeare's nondramatic poetry to be artificial, mechanical, and, overall, "laboured, uphill work." On the whole, wrote Hazlitt, "Our idolatry of Shakespear [...] ceases with his plays."

== Themes ==
Characters of Shakespear's Plays argues against a century and a half of criticism that saw Shakespeare as a "child of nature", deficient in art and full of faults. To anchor his position, Hazlitt makes an observation by the poet Alexander Pope—despite Pope's being one of those very critics—his unifying theme: "every single character in Shakespear, is as much an individual, as those in life itself", and he explores the Shakespearean art that, as much as observation of nature, brought those characters to life.

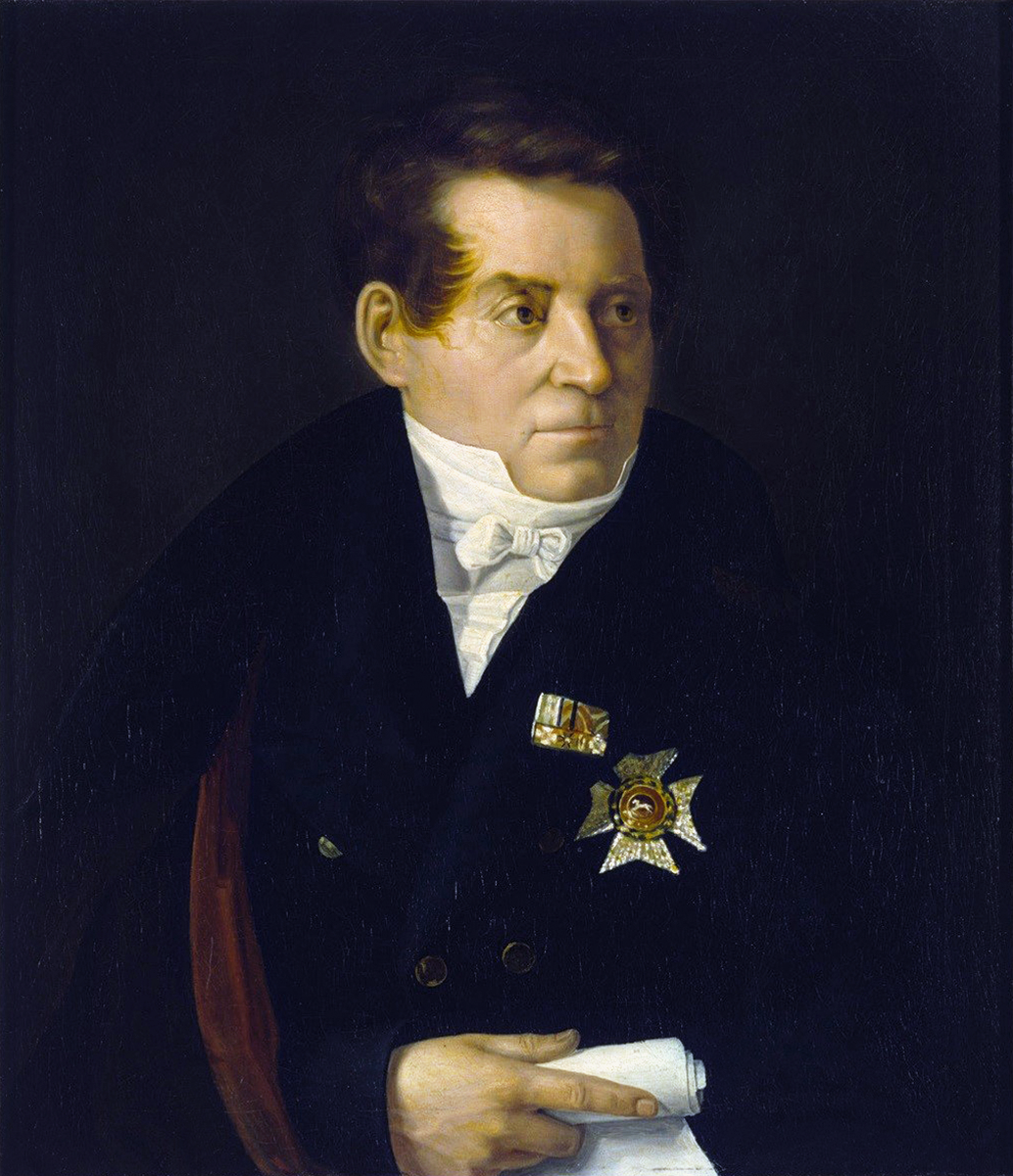
August Wilhelm Schlegel

Much of the book synthesises Hazlitt's own views with those of his predecessors in Shakespearean criticism. The greatest of these critics was August Wilhelm Schlegel, the contemporary German literary scholar and critic who also heavily influenced Coleridge and who Hazlitt believed appreciated Shakespeare better than any English critic. "Certainly no writer among ourselves", wrote Hazlitt, "has shown either the same admiration of his genius, or the same philosophical acuteness in pointing out his characteristic excellences."

Hazlitt also merges with his presentation, in a general way, the approach of his immediate British predecessors, the "character critics", like Maurice Morgann, who had begun to take a psychological approach, focusing on how the characters in the plays behave and think like people we know in real life.

In this vein, each of Hazlitt's essays incorporates numerous often very personal commentaries on the characters. For example, in the account of Cymbeline, he announces, "We have almost as great an affection for Imogen as she had for Posthumus; and she deserves it better." And comparing Falstaff with Prince Hal, he proclaims, "Falstaff is the better man of the two." Commenting on "the character of Hamlet", he in effect joins a discussion among his contemporaries, adding to the mix of similar assessments by Goethe, Schlegel, and Coleridge his observation that Hamlet "is not a character marked by strength of will or even of passion, but by refinement of thought and sentiment."

Although Hazlitt's attention to "characters" in this manner was not original, and was later criticised, he built upon the approach, adding his own conceptions of how Shakespeare presented human nature and experience.

One idea, elaborating on his originally stated theme, to which Hazlitt returns several times—in Macbeth, A Midsummer Night's Dream, Henry IV, and elsewhere—is that Shakespeare does not only create highly individual characters. More than any other dramatist, he creates characters that are of similar general types, and yet, as in real life, differ in subtle ways:

Shakespear was scarcely more remarkable for the force and marked contrasts of his characters than for the truth and subtlety with which he has distinguished those which approached the nearest to each other. For instance, the soul of Othello is hardly more distinct from that of Iago than that of Desdemona is shewn to be from AEmilia's; the ambition of Macbeth is as distinct from the ambition of Richard III. as it is from the meekness of Duncan; the real madness of Lear is as different from the feigned madness of Edgar as from the babbling of the fool [...].

In the classical view, through at least Dr. Johnson, poetry "holds a mirror up to nature". The Romantics began to shift the focus to the role of the imagination. In common with his Romantic contemporaries, Hazlitt focuses on how, to communicate the meaning of the play, Shakespeare's imagination, by the medium of poetry, stimulates the reader's or audience's imagination. Several times, Hazlitt observes how Shakespeare by this imaginative construction seemed to become each character in turn. For example, in "Antony and Cleopatra" he stops to observe, "The characters breathe, move, and live. Shakespear [...] becomes them, and speaks and acts for them." And in "Henry IV": "He appears to have been all the characters, and in all the situations he describes."

We as readers or audience appreciate the characters by the force of our imagination's seeming to participate in the scene, as if we were present during such an event in real life. Commenting on the scene in Julius Caesar where Caesar confides to Marc Antony his apprehensions about Cassius, Hazlitt writes: "We know hardly any passage more expressive of the genius of Shakespeare than this. It is as if he had been actually present, had known the different characters and what they thought of one another, and had taken down what he heard and saw, their looks, words, and gestures, just as they happened." In "Hamlet", he observes that "the characters think and speak and act just as they might do, if left entirely to themselves. [...] The whole play is an exact transcript of what might be supposed to have taken place at the court of Denmark [...]."

In "Troilus and Cressida", by a comparison with Chaucer's method of depicting character, he explains in detail how Shakespeare's idea of "character" is not fixed, and Shakespeare shows the characters not only by their own behaviour but as they view and react to one another. Likewise, Shakespeare's attention was not merely to habitual outward behaviour, but to the most transitory, fleeting inward impressions. "Shakespear exhibited [...] not only what things are in themselves, but whatever they might seem to be, their different reflections, their endless combinations."

At times, Shakespeare's illumination of his characters' inner life was so strong that Hazlitt believed no stage presentation could do justice to Shakespeare's conception. In "Lear" he approvingly quotes his friend Charles Lamb's argument that, in general, Shakespeare's plays are unsuited for the stage. The thought crops up repeatedly that "[t]he stage is not in general the best place to study our author's characters in." And elsewhere, "Poetry and the stage do not agree well together." In such statements, he approached the position of Lamb (to whom he dedicated Characters of Shakespear's Plays), who felt that no stage presentation could do justice to Shakespearean drama, that the artifice of the stage interposes a barrier between the author's conception and the audience's imagination. As critic John Mahoney put it, to both Lamb and Hazlitt, "the performance of Shakespeare in a theatre must always be disappointing to an extent because the slightest departure from the vision conjured by the imagination is so immediately detected and so quickly a source of aesthetic displeasure."

Certain plays in particular fall into the category of those unfitted for the stage, for example, A Midsummer Night's Dream and Hamlet. Particularly in the greatest tragedies, this inner focus is so strong that Hazlitt again advances beyond the idea of individual character to that of the "logic of passion"—powerful emotions experienced interactively, illuminating our common human nature. This idea is developed in Hazlitt's accounts of King Lear, Othello, and Macbeth.

At least partly explaining why both Lamb and Hazlitt felt the inadequacy of Shakespearean stage performances was that the theatres themselves were huge and gaudy, audiences were noisy and unmannerly, and dramatic presentations in the early nineteenth century were sensationalistic, laden with artificial and showy props. In addition, unless one sat down in the pit, one could easily miss the subtleties of the actors' facial and vocal expressions.

For all his insistence that justice could not be done to Shakespeare's plays on stage, Hazlitt frequently made exceptions. A devoted playgoer from an early age, and now a drama critic, he relished many of the stage performances he had witnessed. In some cases, as with Edmund Kean (to whom he refers frequently in this book, usually with admiration) and Sarah Siddons (he could "conceive of nothing grander" than her performance as Lady Macbeth), their interpretations of roles in Shakespearean drama left indelible impressions, extending his ideas of the potential of the characters represented. For example, in "Romeo and Juliet" he proclaims, "Perhaps one of the finest pieces of acting that ever was witnessed on the stage, is Mr. Kean's manner of doing this scene [when Romeo is banished] [...] He treads close indeed upon the genius of his author."

Hazlitt throughout his book seems to waver between these two opinions—that frequently the actors offer the best interpretations of Shakespeare, and that no view of Shakespeare on stage can match the rich experience of reading the plays—without acknowledging the apparent contradiction.

Some plays he considered to be especially suitable for the stage, such as The Winter's Tale, which he declares to be "one of the best-acting of our author's plays". Here he recalls some acting triumphs he had witnessed long ago: "Mrs. Siddons played Hermione, and in the last scene acted the painted statue to the life—with true monumental dignity and noble passion; Mr. Kemble, in Leontes, worked himself up into a very fine classical phrensy; and Bannister, as Autolycus, roared as loud for pity as a sturdy beggar could do who felt none of the pain he counterfeited, and was sound of wind and limb."

Richard III for Hazlitt was another that was "properly a stage-play", and in that chapter "criticise[s] it chiefly with a reference to the manner in which we have seen it performed", and then compares various actors' interpretations of the character of King Richard: "If Mr. Kean does not entirely succeed in concentrating all the lines of the character, as drawn by Shakespear [...] [h]e is more refined than Cooke; more bold, varied, and original than Kemble in the same character."

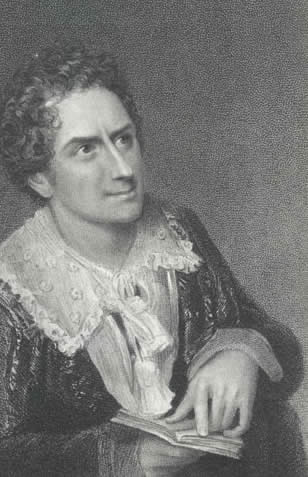
Edmund Kean as Hamlet

Hazlitt also objects to the way Richard III was frequently edited for the stage at that time. "To make room for [...] worse than needless additions" from other plays, often not by Shakespeare, "many of the most striking passages in the real play have been omitted by the foppery and ignorance of the prompt-book critics." Viewing it as the stage presentation of a story, he finds this play is damaged by these manipulations, as, in Shakespeare's original, the "arrangement and developement of the story, and the mutual contrast and combination of the dramatis personae, are in general as finely managed as the developement of the characters or the expression of the passions." He remarks on another kind of editing—what would soon become known as "Bowdlerisation"—in the treatment of a passage in Romeo and Juliet in which the frank speech of Juliet alarmed the prudes of his day. He quotes the passage, commenting that "we have no doubt that it has been expunged from the Family Shakespear."

Story development and "the business of the plot" are scrutinised in several chapters. "Shakespear excelled in the openings of his plays: that of Macbeth is the most striking of any." Commenting on the "developement of the catastrophe" in Cymbeline, he takes occasion to note that the contention of Dr. Johnson that "Shakespear was generally inattentive to the winding-up of his plots", is so far from being true that in King Lear, Romeo and Juliet, Macbeth, Othello, and Hamlet, among "other plays of less moment [...] the last act is crowded with decisive events brought about by natural and striking means." Hazlitt will frequently offer a brief sketch of the story and stop to note particular excellences of Shakespeare's technique. He thus finds the "whole of the trial scene" in The Merchant of Venice to be "a master-piece of dramatic skill."

Occasionally Hazlitt also discusses the plays from yet other perspectives. Shakespeare's reliance on earlier source material comes into consideration in "Coriolanus" and "All's Well that Ends Well" in particular. Repeatedly, Hazlitt focuses on scenes as they were staged. In the words of Arthur Eastman, he "reads the plays like a director, quick to detect cues as to motion, gesture, costume." Remarking on Hazlitt's "theatrical sense", Eastman says that "it's not simply the physical that Hazlitt has in mind—it's the whole interrelationship of one person with another, one mind with other minds—presences both physical and psychological upon a stage."

In line with Schlegel, more than with any previous English-language critic (except Coleridge, who also followed Schlegel), Hazlitt found "unity" in Shakespeare's plays not in their observing the traditional classical unities of time, place, and action, but in their unity of theme. His most complete elaboration of this idea is in his chapter on Antony and Cleopatra:

The jealous attention which has been paid to the unities both of time and place has taken away the principle of perspective in the drama, and all the interest which objects derive from distance, from contrast, from privation, from change of fortune, from long-cherished passion; and contrasts our view of life from a strange and romantic dream, long, obscure, and infinite, into a smartly contested, three hours' inaugural disputation on its merits by the different candidates for theatrical applause.

In the discussion of Macbeth, it is Macbeth's unity of character that is significant. In many chapters, he emphasises the dominant mood, a unifying theme, the "character" of the play as a whole. In, again, Macbeth, the entire play "is done upon a stronger and more systematic principle of contrast than any other of Shakespear's plays." He notes that "a certain tender gloom overspreads the whole" of Cymbeline. Romeo and Juliet shows "the whole progress of human life" in which "one generation pushes another off the stage." Reading A Midsummer Night's Dream "is like wandering in a grove by moonlight: the descriptions breathe a sweetness like odours thrown from beds of flowers."

Another earlier criticism of Shakespeare, that his writing was not "moral", was still alive in Hazlitt's day. Coleridge frequently emphasised the immorality of characters like Falstaff. To Hazlitt, this was entirely the wrong approach to take to morality in the medium of dramatic poetry, and he stops from time to time to comment on Shakespeare's morality. In considering Hamlet, for example, he declares that the character of Hamlet should not be judged by ordinary moral rules. "The ethical delineations of" Shakespeare "do not exhibit the drab-coloured quakerism of morality." In "Measure for Measure" he remarks that Shakespeare's morality is to be judged as that of nature itself: "He taught what he had learnt from her. He shewed the greatest knowledge of humanity with the greatest fellow-feeling for it." Shakespeare's "talent consisted in sympathy with human nature, in all its shapes, degrees, depressions, and elevations", and this attitude could be considered immoral only if one considers morality to be "made up of antipathies".

Scattered throughout the chapters are more general critical discussions, such as that on tragedy in the essay "Othello", comedy in "Twelfth Night", and the value for human life of poetry in general, in "Lear", among many others. Along the way, Hazlitt intersperses lengthy quotations from the plays, sharing with the reader poetic passages he thought particularly excellent. This practice resembled the by then common practice of collecting long extracts from the plays as the "beauties" of Shakespeare. Hazlitt, however, also adds critical commentary (though often far less extensive than would become the practice in later years), with the quotations illustrating particular points about the plays as well as sharing with his readers what he thought worthy of attention. All this, done as no one had before, made Characters of Shakespear's Plays the first handbook for the study and appreciation of all of Shakespeare's plays.

== Critical response ==
=== 1817–1830: Contemporary reception ===
Characters of Shakespear's Plays was Hazlitt's most successful book. As he had circulated advance copies before publication, it was noticed favourably before it formally appeared on 9 July 1817. Leigh Hunt proclaimed enthusiastically that "it is the least of all its praises to say that it must inevitably supersede the dogmatical and half-informed criticisms of Johnson."

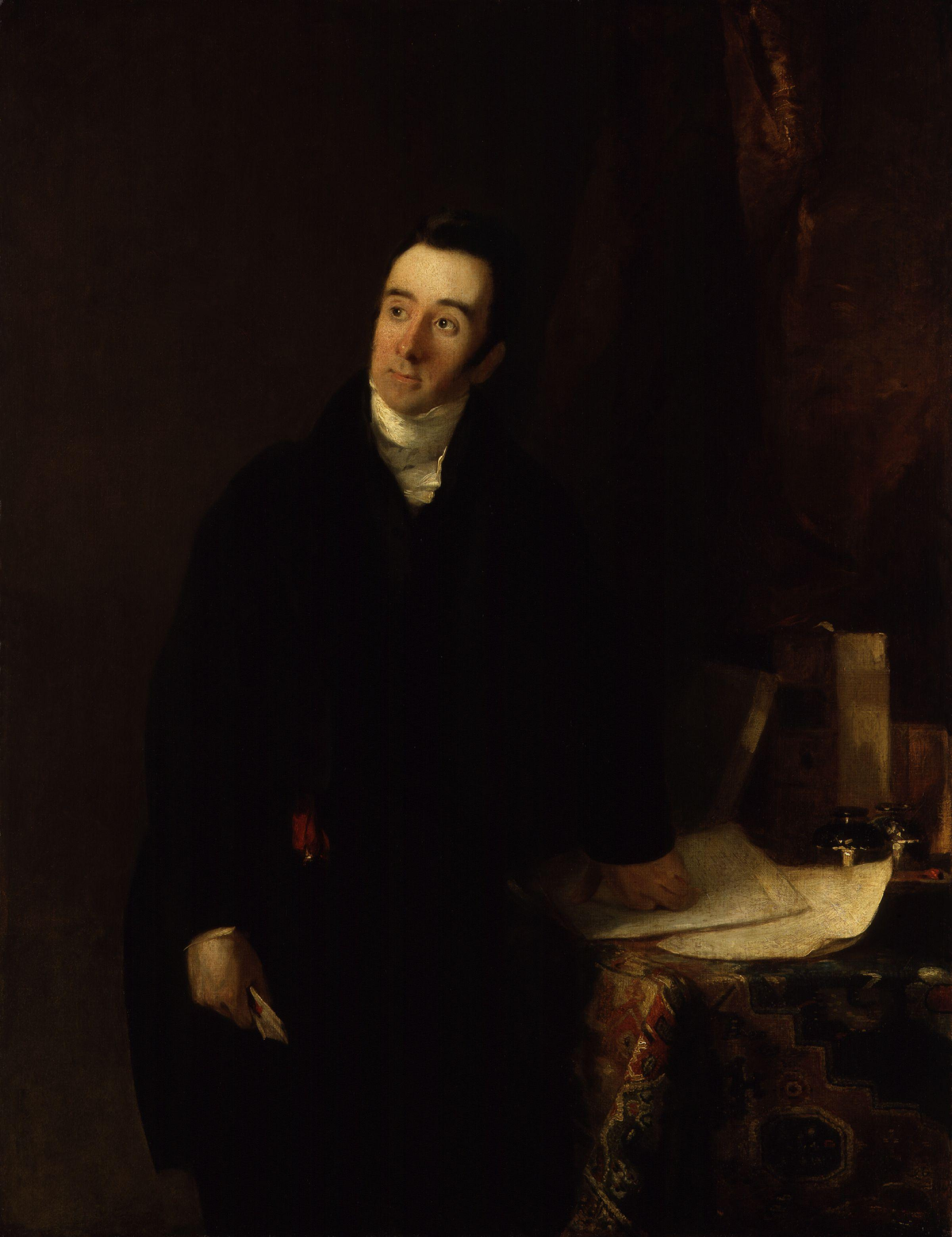
Francis Jeffrey, editor of the Edinburgh Review

After publication, not all of the reaction was this positive. The Tory British Critic sniped that the book was "stuffed with dull, common-place, Jacobin declamation", and The Quarterly Review, with the same political bias, rebuked Hazlitt for his uncomplimentary portrayal of King Henry VIII. But for the most part, the praise continued. Hunt, in a fuller review in The Examiner, applauded not only the author's enthusiasm "but the very striking susceptibility with which he changes his own humour and manner according to the nature of the play he comes upon; like a spectator in a theatre, who accompanies the turns of the actor's face with his own." John Hamilton Reynolds, reviewing it in The Champion, went so far as to claim that "This is the only work ever written on Shakespeare that can be deemed worthy of Shakespeare".

The first edition sold out in six weeks. It was only some months afterward that the voice of Francis Jeffrey, the highly respected editor of The Edinburgh Review, was heard. Jeffrey began by expressing reservations: this is not a book of great learning and less a book of criticism than of appreciation. And yet, Jeffrey concedes, the "appreciation" is of the highest kind, and he is "not [...] much inclined to disagree with" Hazlitt "after reading his eloquent exposition" of the points he makes about Shakespeare. "The book [...] is written less to tell the reader what Mr. H. knows about Shakespeare or his writings, than to explain to them what he feels about them—and why he feels so—and thinks that all who profess to love poetry should feel so likewise." While Characters does not "show extraordinary knowledge of [Shakespeare's] production" it nevertheless shows "very considerable originality and genius."

On 30 May 1818, a second edition appeared, this time published by Taylor and Hessey. At first this sold well. At that time, however, literary criticism was subject to exceptionally strong political influences. In particular, the most unscrupulous of the Tory periodicals did not hesitate to indulge in barefaced lies to discredit adherents of what they considered unacceptable political views. Hazlitt, never reticent about criticising kings or government ministers, soon became a target. Only a little more than a week had passed when the Quarterly Review "delivered a diabolical notice of Characters of Shakespeare's Plays—possibly by its editor, William Gifford." (It could have actually been by a certain John Russell, writing anonymously; but Hazlitt laid the blame on Gifford, who was responsible for the journal's contents and may have encouraged Russell.) Gifford, or Russell, sliding from literary criticism into character assassination, wrote:

We should not have condescended to notice the senseless and wicked sophistry of this writer [...] had we not considered him as one of the representatives of a class of men by whom literature is more than at any former period disgraced [...] it might not be unprofitable to show how small a portion of talent and literature was necessary for carrying on the trade of sedition. [Hazlitt had dared to criticise the character of King Henry VIII.] The few specimens which we have selected of his ethics and his criticism are more than sufficient to prove that Mr. Hazlitt's knowledge of Shakespeare and the English language is exactly on a par with the purity of his morals and the depth of his understanding.

Sales completely dried up. Hazlitt got the chronology a bit wrong but was otherwise not exaggerating when he wrote in 1821:

Taylor and Hessey told me that they had sold nearly two editions of the Characters of Shakespear's Plays in about three months, but that after the Quarterly Review of them came out, they never sold another copy.

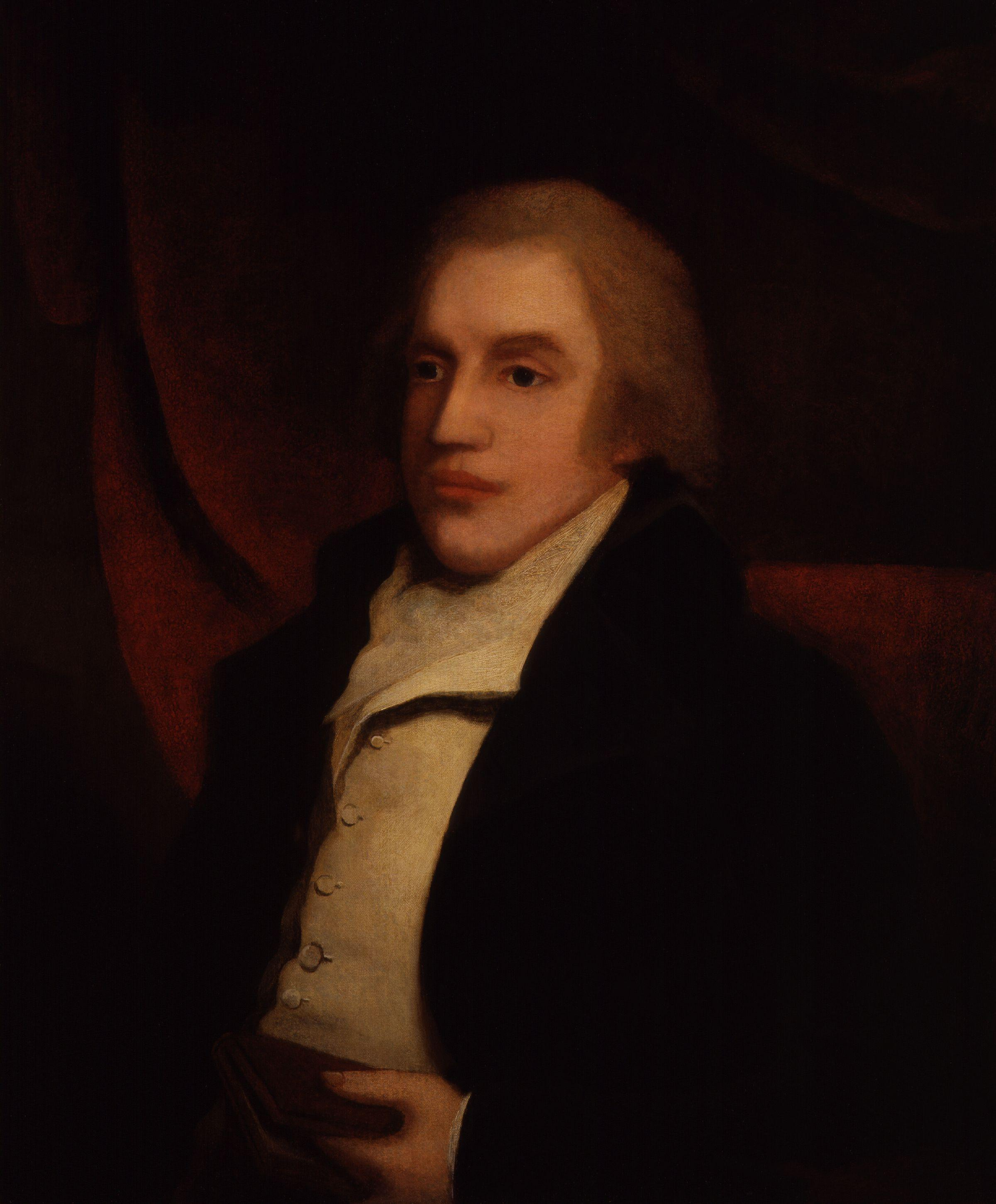
William Gifford, editor of the Quarterly Review

The attacks in the Tory periodicals, soon extended to other works by Hazlitt, killed not merely the sales of Characters of Shakespear's Plays but, as far as much of the general public was concerned, his reputation as a literary critic.

=== 1830–1900: Under a cloud ===
Though the influence of Hazlitt's only full-length treatment of Shakespeare somewhat receded, it did not completely die out. Hazlitt's son and grandson brought out editions of Hazlitt's works later in the century. His miscellaneous and familiar essays were read, and Hazlitt was commended as a stylist by a discerning few. As a critic, though he had passed out of the public eye, an even more select few understood how high a place he deserved in the ranking of literary critics. William Makepeace Thackeray, for example, praised Hazlitt in 1844 as "one of the keenest and brightest critics that ever lived." Another rare exception was the Scottish journalist Alexander Ireland, who in a brief memoir of Hazlitt in 1889 wrote that Hazlitt's book on Shakespeare, "although it professes to be dramatic criticism, is in reality a discourse on the philosophy of life and human nature, more suggestive than many approved treatises expressly devoted to that subject."

For the most part, although Hazlitt continued to be read and his influence was to a degree felt, he was throughout most of the remainder of the nineteenth century infrequently cited as a critic.

=== 1900–1950: Reemergence ===
Around the turn of the twentieth century, the influence of Characters began to be exerted more explicitly, notably in the studies of critic A.C. Bradley, who approvingly adopted Hazlitt's explanation of the character of Iago. At about this time, George Saintsbury, who wrote a comprehensive history of English criticism (finished in 1904), recorded his extreme distaste for Hazlitt's character, and, as noted by critic Elisabeth Schneider, found his writings "filled with vast ignorance, errors, prejudice, and an unpleasantness of temper amounting almost to insanity". Yet he also ranked Hazlitt high as a critic, among the greatest in the language. Characters he placed lower than some of Hazlitt's other critical works; yet he allowed that, aside from such "outbursts" as his railing against the historical King Henry V, and his over-reliance on quotation from Schlegel, Characters of Shakespear's Plays is filled with much that is admirable, notably Hazlitt's comparison of Chaucer's and Shakespeare's characterisation and his observation that Shakespeare "has no prejudices for or against his characters". Saintsbury found Hazlitt's critical judgements sound as a rule, and he thought that the characterisations of Falstaff and Shylock were "masterpieces".

Even as the "character" critics began to fall out of favour, and Hazlitt, who was lumped together with them, was also pushed aside, some influence remained. Hazlitt's general approach to Shakespeare's plays, in conveying the prevailing mood, the character of the play itself, had its influence on later twentieth-century critics, like G. Wilson Knight. Other major Shakespeareans, like John Dover Wilson, would occasionally refer approvingly to one of Hazlitt's insights or notable passages, such as the characterisation of Falstaff.

=== 1950–1970: Revaluation ===
Hazlitt's Shakespearean criticism continued to find some acceptance from then on, yet a stigma still hung about his character, and his criticism was often judged to be overly emotional and "impressionistic". This attitude changed only gradually. In 1955, René Wellek, in his history of literary criticism in all Western culture for the previous two centuries, largely supported these earlier views. Characters, to him, centres excessively on Shakespeare's characters and, worse, Hazlitt "confuses fiction and reality" and discusses fictional characters as though they were real people. Yet he also notes, a half-century after Saintsbury, and following Schneider's lead, that for all of Hazlitt's impressionism, "there is more theory in Hazlitt than is generally realised." He also thought that Hazlitt shows considerable "psychological acumen" in explaining certain types of characters, such as Iago, and that Hazlitt's "character sketch of Iago is superior to Coleridge's". He also praises Hazlitt's freedom, in Characters and elsewhere, from "the defects which infected his nearest critical rivals, Johnson and Coleridge: chauvinism, prudery, and unctuous sermonising. [...] He is free of the prudery which in his day pervaded English culture."

Contemporaneously, Walter Jackson Bate, a critic specialising in the English Romantic period, voiced his approval of Hazlitt's Shakespearean criticism, seen in the context of that of other Romantics. "Like Coleridge [...] or [...] Keats", wrote Bate, "Hazlitt had the characteristic romantic delight in Shakespeare's ability to unveil character in a single passage or even a single line—in 'flashes of passion' that offer a 'revelation as it were of the whole context of our being.'"

More attention soon came to Hazlitt's book. Lionel Trilling was the first critic to recognise the importance of Hazlitt's radically new idea about poetry as expressed in his essay on Coriolanus. Herschel Baker in 1962 noted that the best parts of Hazlitt's book, such as the "stirring essays on Othello and Macbeth", place "Hazlitt near the top of those who have written greatly on the greatest of all writers."

In 1968, Arthur M. Eastman published a retrospective study of 350 years of Shakespearean criticism. At that time, it still seemed necessary to apologise for including Hazlitt among the major Shakespearean critics of his age. But in A Short History of Shakespearean Criticism, Eastman finally concludes that, although much of what Hazlitt says about Shakespeare is not original, it "is well enough said to find a place in the story."

Before Eastman finishes, however, he enumerates several things that Hazlitt did formulate in an original manner. Besides such memorable expressions as "It is we who are Hamlet", Hazlitt, like no critic before him, was supremely attentive to "the whole interrelationship of one person with another, one mind with other minds—presences both physical and psychological upon a stage." With this focus on what Hazlitt had to say about Shakespeare's stagecraft and the way his plays were acted, Eastman thus rescued him from the opprobrium of being associated, in the most superficial way, with the "character" critics. Differing from his contemporaries Lamb and Coleridge, "Hazlitt [...] brings to Shakespeare both a drama critic's sense of the plays as theatre and a closet critic's sense that the theatre of the mind so far surpasses that of the stage that certain of the plays can only be acted there."

Eastman also points to Hazlitt's focus on the underlying unity of the plays. Hazlitt may not have done this as well as Coleridge (who, Eastman thought, was better at suggesting avenues of approach for others to find unity in Shakespeare's plays), "Yet the demonstrations of unity in Cymbeline and Othello and King Lear make us see what otherwise we might not." Eastman also rescues Hazlitt's political commentary, which, however abrasive it might be, "opens such questions" for general discussion, "so that the politics of the plays enters into the arena of interpretation in a new and dignified way."

Overall, Eastman concludes, despite the book's many shortcomings, Characters of Shakespear's Plays was the "best handbook" of its century for the study of Shakespeare's plays.

=== 1970–2000: Revival ===
It remained for John Kinnaird in his 1978 full-length study of Hazlitt as thinker and critic to reconcile Hazlitt as "character" critic with Hazlitt as drama critic. Hazlitt was a character critic to an extent; but he was also a dramatic critic who paid attention to staging and dramatic form. And even his character criticism transcended the focus on individual characters to create "a larger study of the ways of dramatic imagination". In the course of his study of Shakespeare, Hazlitt, as Kinnaird points out, also shows how it is Shakespeare's "art" that enables him to represent "nature", dismissing the older critical view that Shakespeare was a "child of nature" but deficient in "art".

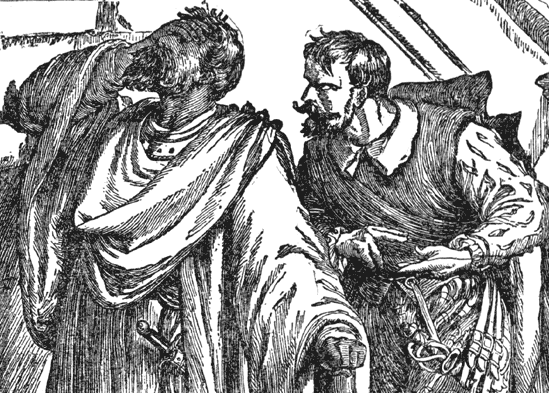
Othello and Iago

Kinnaird further delves into the ideas in Characters of Shakespear's Plays, especially that of "power" as involved in Shakespeare's plays and as investigated by Hazlitt, not only the power in physical force but the power of imagination in sympathising with physical force, which at times can overcome our will to the good. He explores Hazlitt's accounts of Shakespeare's tragedies—Macbeth, Hamlet, Othello, King Lear, and especially Coriolanus—where he shows that Hazlitt reveals that our love of power in sympathising with what can involve evil can overcome the human desire for the good. This, Kinnaird points out, has serious implications in considering the meaning and purpose of tragic literature in general.

Along the way, Kinnaird notes the influence of Characters on later Shakespearean criticism, including that of A.C. Bradley, G. Wilson Knight, and C.L. Barber.

Hazlitt, concludes, Kinnaird, was too often misunderstood and dismissed as no more than a "character" critic. But his contribution to Shakespeare studies was much broader and deeper than that, and, despite problems with some of Hazlitt's own theories, Characters of Shakespear's Plays was a "seminal" work.

By this time, a revival of interest in Hazlitt was well under way. Only a few years later, in 1983, in his study of Hazlitt as critic, David Bromwich considers at length some issues involving Characters of Shakespear's Plays. Against some allegations to the contrary in earlier studies of Hazlitt, Bromwich concludes that Hazlitt borrowed little from Coleridge, and he presents several contrasts in their critical views, particularly about Shakespeare, as evidence. In extended discussions of Hazlitt's critical treatment of the character of Iago in Othello, of Shylock in The Merchant of Venice, of Caliban in The Tempest, of Hamlet, and, at great length, of Coriolanus, he uses the contrast between Coleridge's criticism and Hazlitt's to highlight the essential originality of Hazlitt's critical stance, and he observes that Hazlitt's views frequently provide a bracing alternative to Coleridge's. He also delves into the issue of Hazlitt's influence on Keats partly by means of Characters, particularly the chapter on King Lear, and he finds in Hazlitt's comments on Lear interesting contrasts and similarities with the critical views of Wordsworth and Shelley. Building upon the arguments advanced by Kinnaird, Bromwich further challenges the "reductive" notion that Characters was simply a work of "character" criticism.

=== 2000 and afterward ===
Sustained by the accelerated revival of interest in Hazlitt toward the close of the twentieth century, the legacy of Characters of Shakespear's Plays has been valued increasingly as well. In 1994 Harold Bloom, in voicing his appreciation of Hazlitt's accounts of Coriolanus and of Edmund in King Lear, ranked Hazlitt second only to Dr. Johnson as an English-language literary critic. He echoed and reinforced that assessment in his 2008 edition of Othello. Other new editions of Shakespeare also look back to Hazlitt's interpretations of his plays. In 2000, Jonathan Arac in The Cambridge History of Literary Criticism placed Hazlitt with Schlegel and Coleridge as distinguished Shakespearean critics of their age and noted his study of Shakespeare as one of the "landmarks that still serve as points of departure for fresh thinking nearly two centuries later." In 2006, with Hazlitt's full reinstatement as a major Shakespearean critic, philosopher Colin McGinn based an entire book about Shakespeare's plays on Hazlitt's idea that Shakespeare was a "philosophical" poet.
