= William Hazlitt (disambiguation) =

William Hazlitt (1778–1830) was an English critic and essayist.

William Hazlitt may also refer to:

- William Hazlitt (Unitarian minister) (1737–1820), his father; Irish-born English minister
- William Hazlitt (registrar) (1811–1893), his son; English lawyer and translator
- William Carew Hazlitt (1834–1913), his grandson; English lawyer, editor and writer
