= Sarah Stoddart Hazlitt =

Sarah Stoddart Hazlitt (1774–1843) was an English journalist and walker, and wife of the essayist William Hazlitt.

== Early life and relationships ==
She was born in 1774, the only daughter of John Stoddart, lieutenant in the Royal Navy. Her older brother and only sibling John Stoddart later became editor of The Times.

Stoddart was part of a circle which included Romantic writers William Wordsworth, Samuel Taylor Coleridge, Robert Southey and William Godwin. Stoddart was a good friend of Mary Lamb, sister of Charles Lamb.

Prior to her marriage, Stoddart lived with her brother in Malta whilst he was Advocate of the Crown and of the Admiralty for Malta.

== Marriage and divorce ==
On 12 May 1808, Stoddart married William Hazlitt, English essayist, drama and literary critic, painter, social commentator, and philosopher. They met through the Lambs. Shortly before the wedding, John Stoddart established a trust into which he began paying £100 per year, for the benefit of Hazlitt and his wife—this was a very generous gesture, but Hazlitt detested being supported by his brother-in-law, whose political beliefs he despised. This union was not a love match, and incompatibilities would later drive the couple apart; yet, for a while, it seemed to work well enough, and their initial behaviour was both playful and affectionate. Miss Stoddart, an unconventional woman, accepted Hazlitt and tolerated his eccentricities just as he, with his own somewhat offbeat individualism, accepted her. The couple had three sons over the next few years. Only one of their children, William, born in 1811, survived infancy. (He in turn fathered William Carew Hazlitt.)

Between their wedding and 1812, the Hazlitts lived in a small estate at Winterslow near Salisbury, which had been inherited by and belonged to Stoddart Hazlitt. In 1812 they moved to 19 York Street, Westminster, a house that previously belonged to Milton.

In 1819, following increasing difficulties in their marriage related to finances, adultery and lack of love, Stoddart Hazlitt and her husband effectively separated and stopped living together, though they remained on speaking terms.

In April 1822, Stoddart Hazlitt travelled to Edinburgh from London. She and her husband sought a divorce; this would be achieved more easily in Scotland, where Scottish law would more easily grant divorce in the case of adultery. Whilst in Edinburgh, it was arranged that Stoddart Hazlitt would 'catch' her husband in the act of adultery. The divorce was finalised on 17 July 1822.

== Walking tours ==
Whilst in Scotland, Stoddart Hazlitt undertook a number of walking tours in the Southern Highlands. Between 13 and 20 May 1822, she walked 170 miles from Stirling back to Edinburgh, travelling through sights such as the Falls of Leny, Loch Katrine, Loch Lomond, the Falls of Clyde and New Lanark.

On 31 May, she undertook another tour, this time from the Forth through to Perth, Dunkeld, Crieff and then Stirling, this time walking 112 miles in five days.

The journals of Stoddart Hazlitt's tours were published as Journal of My Trip to Scotland in the Le Gallienne edition of William Hazlitt's Liber Amoris in 1893.

== Death and legacy ==
Following her divorce, little more is known of her life. Stoddart Hazlitt travelled around France and England and remained relatively close with Hazlitt, keeping his surname until her death. Stoddart Hazlitt died in 1843. Her grave has yet to be located.

Though the journal of her walking tours is perhaps the most extensive account of her life, most of Stoddart Hazlitt's legacy has been dictated by Hazlitt's accounts of his ex-wife, which often portray her as cold and selfish. With notable exceptions, Stoddart Hazlitt's Journal of My Trip to Scotland has also been frequently dismissed and was last printed in 1959. In 2021, The Sarah Stoddart Hazlitt Project was established to facilitate "the study and celebration of the life, writing, and travels of Sarah Stoddart Hazlitt." On the 200th anniversary of Journal of my Trip to Scotland in the spring and summer of 2022, this project also created a daily newsletter that emailed subscribers entries from Stoddart Hazlitt's journal exactly 200 years after they were written.
