= Table-Talk =

19th-century essay collection by William Hazlitt

Table-Talk; Or, Original Essays
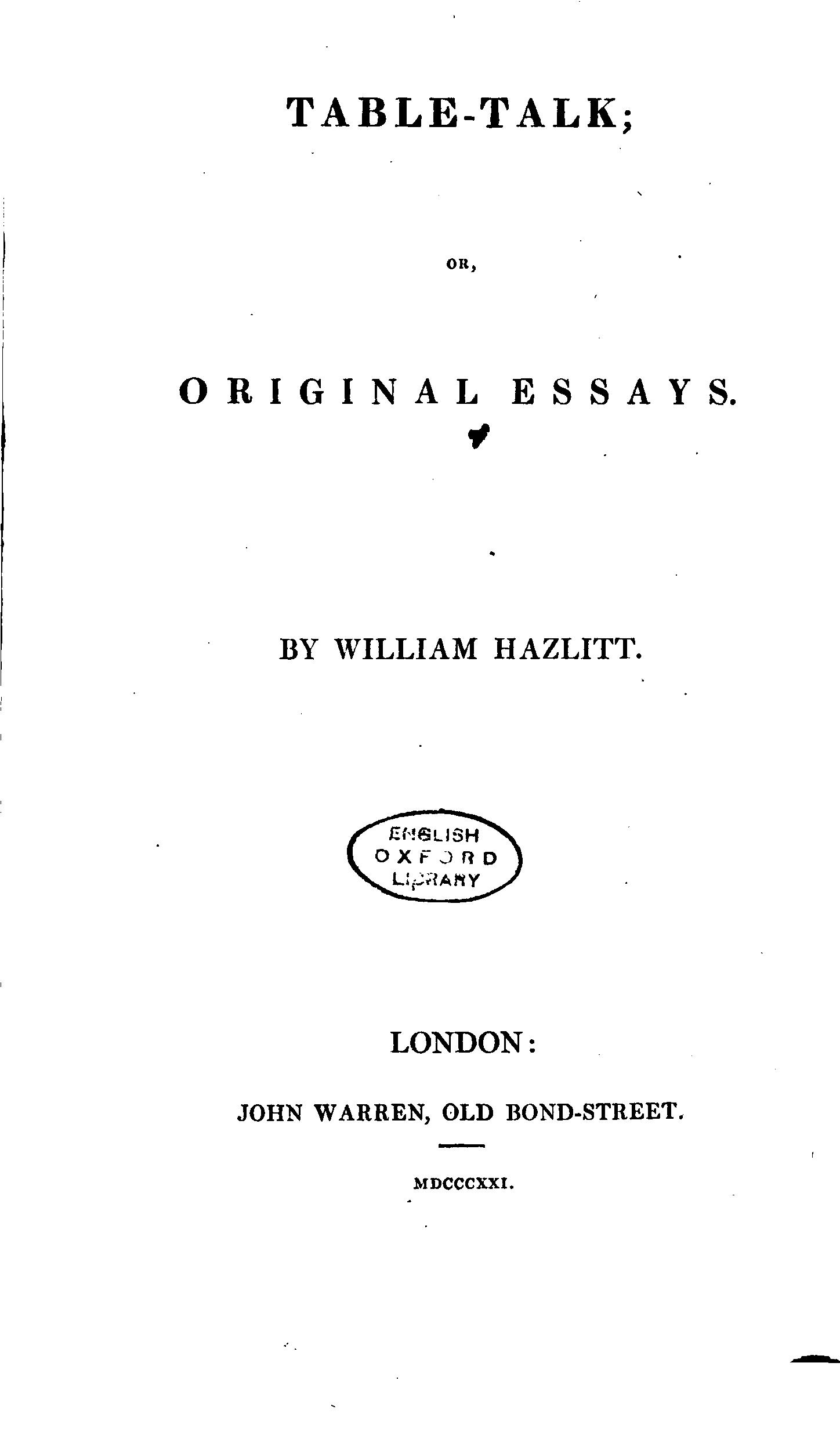
- Title page of Table-Talk, volume 1 of 1st edition
- Author: William Hazlitt
- Language: English
- Genre: Cultural criticism, social criticism
- Publisher: John Warren
- Publication date: Vol. I: 6 April 1821; Vol. II: 15 June 1822
- Publication place: England
- Preceded by: Lectures Chiefly on the Dramatic Literature of the Age of Elizabeth
- Followed by: Characteristics: In the Manner of Rochefoucault's Maxims

Table-Talk is a collection of essays by the English cultural critic and social commentator William Hazlitt. It was originally published as two volumes, the first of which appeared in April 1821. The essays deal with topics such as art, literature and philosophy. Duncan Wu has described the essays as the "pinnacle of [Hazlitt's] achievement", and argues that Table-Talk and The Plain Speaker (1826) represent Hazlitt's masterpiece.

== Background ==
Hazlitt published his first book, a work of philosophy, in 1805. In the years between his authorial debut and the publication of Table-Talk, Hazlitt was employed as a journalist, critic and lecturer, and published several collections of writing on topics such as Shakespearean criticism, politics and literature. In 1819, following the hostile reception of his Political Essays by the Tory press and the repressive legislation introduced after the Peterloo Massacre, Hazlitt foreswore writing further essays on political subjects. Political insight is by no means absent from Hazlitt's subsequent works, and publications such as The Spirit of the Age (1825) condemn figures such as Robert Southey for their abandonment of political radicalism, while Hazlitt's biography of Napoleon (four volumes; 1828–1830) aimed to defend his reputation against a biography from the Tory Sir Walter Scott.

Hazlitt's first wife, Sarah Stoddart, owned property in Winterslow, a village in Wiltshire. Hazlitt regularly travelled from London to the village, and was particularly fond of staying at Winterslow Hut, an inn, where he could write in peace. Many of the Table-Talk essays were composed there. The second volume was completed on 7 March 1822 at Renton Inn, near Edinburgh.

== Content ==
An example of Hazlitt's style is provided by the first essay in the volume, entitled "On the Pleasure of Painting". The piece was originally intended to be a reflection on the life of Hazlitt's father, who died in 1820. However, it grew into an account of Hazlitt's views on the nature of art and the mental satisfaction to be derived from painting. It concludes with a deeply personal account of an occasion when Hazlitt painted his father's portrait in the Unitarian chapel at Wem, Shropshire. The use of the pronoun "I" here, along with the personal subject matter, is indicative of Hazlitt's mastery of the familiar essay.

I used regularly to set my work in the chair to look at it through the long evenings; and many a time did I return to take leave of it before I could go to bed at night... I think, but am not sure, that I finished this portrait (or another afterwards) on the same day that the news of the battle of Austerlitz came; I walked out in the afternoon, and, as I returned, saw the evening star set over a poor man's cottage with other thoughts and feelings than I shall ever have again. Oh for the revolution of the great Platonic year, that those times might come over again! I could sleep out the three hundred and sixty-five thousand intervening years very contentedly!--The picture is left: the table, the chair, the window where I learned to construe Livy, the chapel where my father preached, remain where they were; but he himself is gone to rest, full of years, of faith, of hope, and charity!

Another essay in the volume, "The Indian Jugglers", is often included in anthologies of Hazlitt's writings. After philosophically musing on the nature of greatness and genius, Hazlitt concludes the essay with a reprise of his obituary of John Cavanagh, a noted fives player who died in 1819.

== Reception ==
For some years, Hazlitt's work had been routinely attacked by Tory critics, particularly those associated with Blackwood's Magazine and the Quarterly Review. The reception of the first volume of Table-Talk by the Tory journals was, unsurprisingly, negative. Leigh Hunt, an erstwhile friend of Hazlitt, was extremely offended by the fact that he had been included in Hazlitt's essay titled "On People with One Idea". The reception of the second volume was similar, with Blackwood's describing it as a "gaping sore of wounded and festering vanity".
