= The Classical Gazetteer =

The Classical Gazetteer is a short descriptive geographical dictionary by William Hazlitt (son of the critic William Hazlitt), written in 1851 and containing 15,000 places of Greek and Roman antiquity without citation of primary sources.
