= William Bewick =

English painter

William Bewick (1795–1866) was an English painter. Born in Darlington, County Durham, Bewick was the son of an upholsterer. He went to London to train under the painter Benjamin Haydon at the age of 20.

Bewick executed a large cartoon of some of the figures in the Elgin Marbles at the request of the German poet Goethe. He also worked as a copyist, so successfully that Sir Thomas Lawrence sent him to copy Michelangelo's frescoes of the Sistine Chapel in Rome in 1826. Upon his return three years later, he worked as a historical and portrait painter. Forced to retire by illness, Bewick spent his last 20 years in north-east England. Life and Letters of William Bewick were published by Thomas Landseer, the brother of the famous painter, in 1871. They form a source for Haydon's circle and include a character study of William Hazlitt, whom Bewick knew well. They include a description of the poet Foscolo reciting his poetry in the presence of Wordsworth.
