= Shrewsbury Unitarian Church =

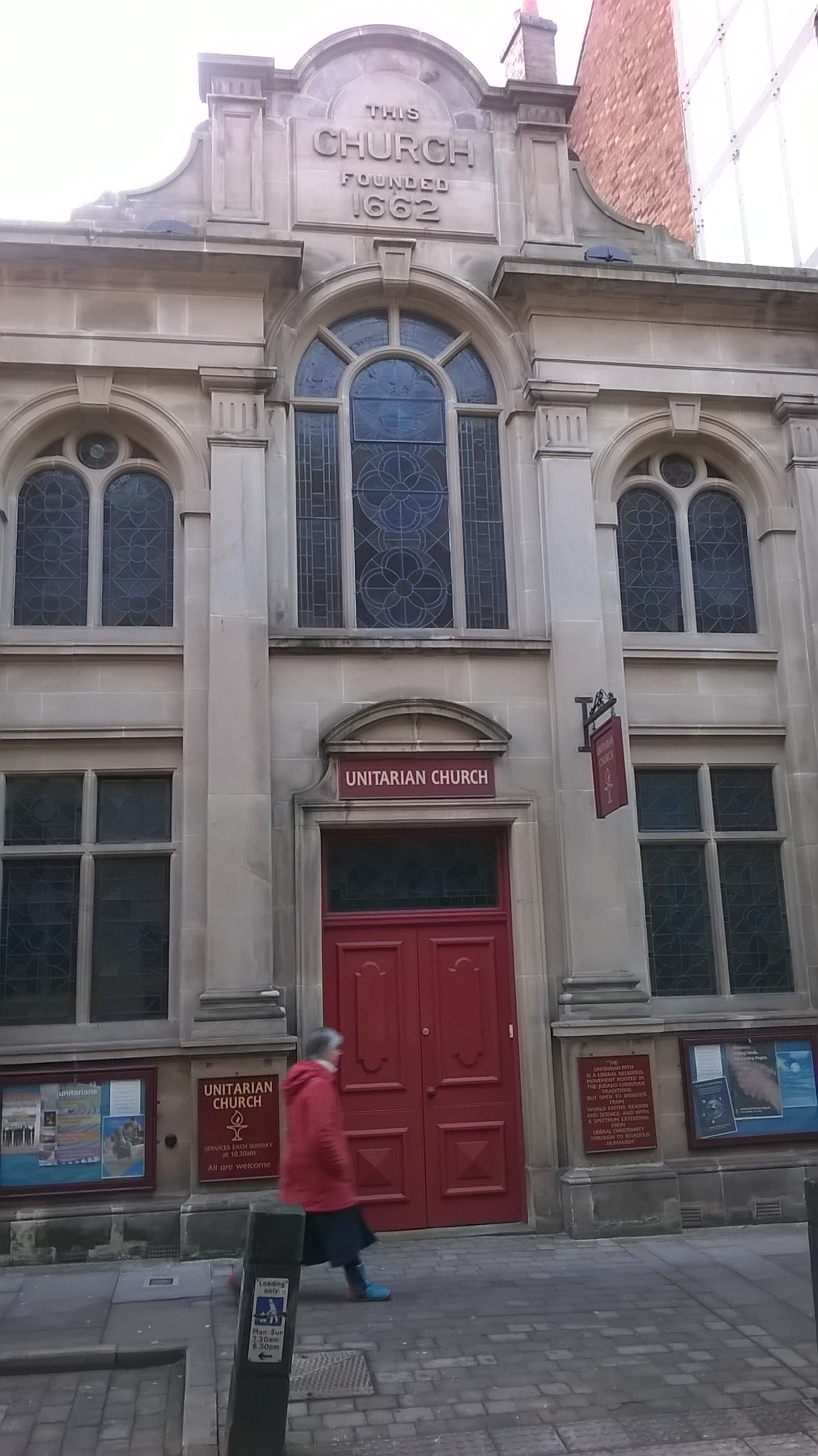
- Façade
- Shrewsbury Unitarian Church
- 52.7073°N 2.7533°W
- OS grid reference: SJ 49198 12443
- Country: England
- Denomination: Unitarian
- Website: www.ukunitarians.org.uk/shrewsbury/index.htm

History
- Founded: 1662

Architecture
- Heritage designation: Grade II listed

Shrewsbury Unitarian Church is a Grade II listed building situated on the High Street in Shrewsbury, England. The meeting house was founded in its present site in 1662 by the Revd Francis Tallents and the Revd John Bryan, two dissenters ejected from St Mary's Church and St Chad's Church respectively. It was destroyed by a mob of Jacobite supporters in 1715 but rebuilt the same year.

In 1798, Samuel Coleridge accepted the position of minister at the church, (salary £120 a year) and the effect of his first sermon is recorded by the 19-year-old William Hazlitt from Wem. Arriving in Shrewsbury at 8 p.m. on Saturday 13 January, he preached his first sermon on 14 January and with two others on 21 and 28 January, allowing him to leave Shrewsbury on 29 January for Cote House, the home of John Wedgewood at Westbury near Bristol. Coleridge's stay in Shrewsbury was just over two weeks before being offered £150 a year from Thomas Wedgwood to give up his position and study poetry and philosophy.

Charles Darwin worshipped at the church until he was eight years of age when his mother died in 1817.

The whole building was rebuilt on its present site in 1839-40 by local architect, John Carline, Jnr with money provided by George the First's government.

The town plan of 1882 shows it had a small courtyard, which was removed when the High Street was widened, and that it seated 350 people. In 1885 its present stone façade was made designed by another local architect, A.B. Deakin.
