= John Cavanagh (fives player) =

Irish fives player (died 1819)

Personal information
- Nickname: Jack
- Nationality: Irish
- Died: 1819

Sport
- Sport: Fives

John Cavanagh (died 1819) was an Irish sportsman, regarded as the greatest fives player in Regency London.

== Life ==
Cavanagh was employed as a house-painter in London, and was an Irish Catholic by birth. At one point he lived in Buckbridge Street in St Giles-in-the-Fields, which was associated with London's Irish Catholic community. He played fives at the court on St. Martin's Street, in Westminster, and "for wagers and dinners" at Copenhagen House and at other public houses. In his essay 'The Indian Jugglers', William Hazlitt – an enthusiastic fives player himself – described Cavanagh's play as follows:

Whenever he touched the ball there was an end of the chase. His eye was certain, his hand fatal, his presence of mind complete. He could do what he pleased, and he always knew exactly what to do. He saw the whole game, and played it; took instant advantage of his adversary's weakness, and recovered balls, as if by a miracle and from sudden thought, that every one gave for lost. He had equal power and skill, quickness and judgment. He could either outwit his antagonist by finesse, or beat him by main strength.

Hazlitt remarked that the only unusual aspect of Cavanagh's game was that he:

... never volleyed, but let the balls hop; but if they rose an inch from the ground he never missed having them. There was not only nobody equal, but nobody second to him. It is supposed that he could give any other player half the game, or beat him with his left hand.

Cavanagh died at his home in Burbage Street, St Giles, in early 1819. He had ceased playing fives several years earlier. After his death, an obituary was written by Hazlitt and published in The Examiner, an extract from which later appeared in Hazlitt's Table-Talk collection as part of the 'Indian Jugglers' chapter.
