= Winterslow Hut =

Former coaching inn in Wiltshire, England

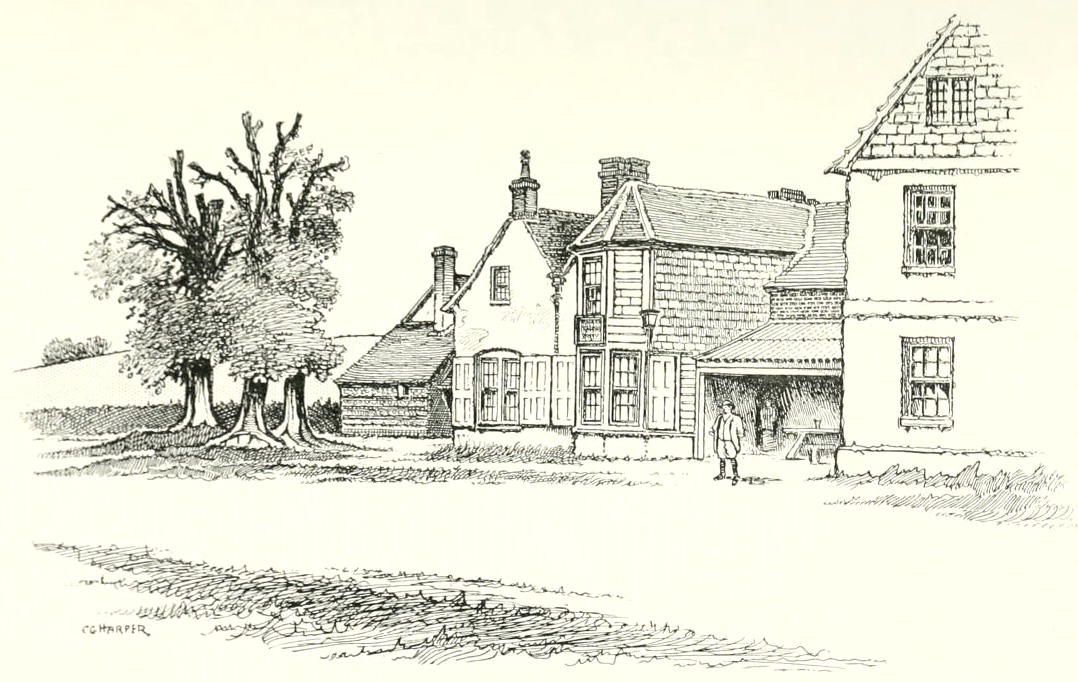
- Winterslow Hut c. 1899
- Interactive map of the Winterslow Hut area
- Alternative names: The Pheasant Hotel; The Pheasant Inn; The Pheasantry

General information
- Status: Ceased trading in 2007, converted to 4 modern dwellings in 2010
- Type: Coaching inn
- Location: London Road, Winterslow, Wiltshire, England
- Coordinates: 51.1120°N 1.6705°W

The Winterslow Hut was a late 17th-century coaching inn on the London to Exeter stagecoach route at Winterslow, Wiltshire, England. Its isolated location, on Salisbury Plain between Salisbury and Andover, with a spring close by, made it a useful resting place for drovers, and later for stage and mail coaches.

The quiet surroundings and solitude, interrupted only by the arrival of the coaches, also drew the critic and essayist William Hazlitt to the inn in the early 19th century. He regularly rented a room and produced some of his greatest writing there, including Lectures on the English Comic Writers (1819) and the first volume of Table-Talk (1821).

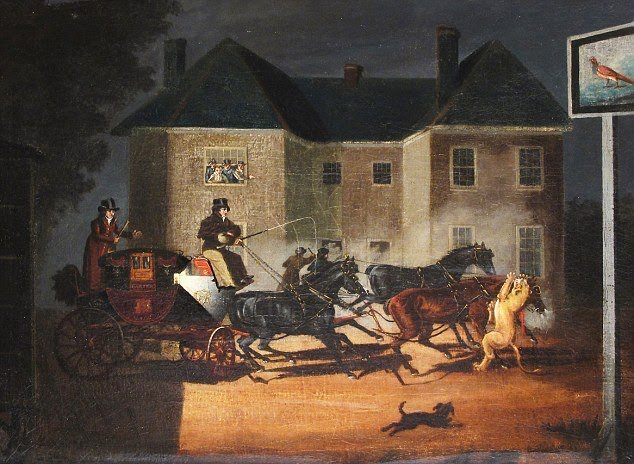
Artist's impression of the attack on 20 October 1816

The inn was brought to national attention when an escaped lioness attacked the horses of the London-bound Quicksilver mail coach as it drew up outside the inn during the night of 20 October 1816.

During the Second World War the inn was used as off-base officers' accommodation for Royal Air Force night fighter crews stationed at RAF Middle Wallop.

== Fate ==
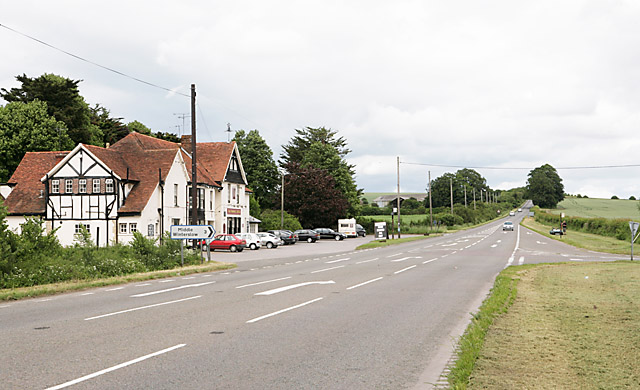
The Pheasant Hotel in 2007

By the 20th century the business was trading as the Pheasant Hotel or the Pheasant Inn. The inn closed in 2007 and the much-altered building is now four dwellings.
