= The Round Table (book) =

The Round Table: A Collection of Essays on Literature, Men, and Manners
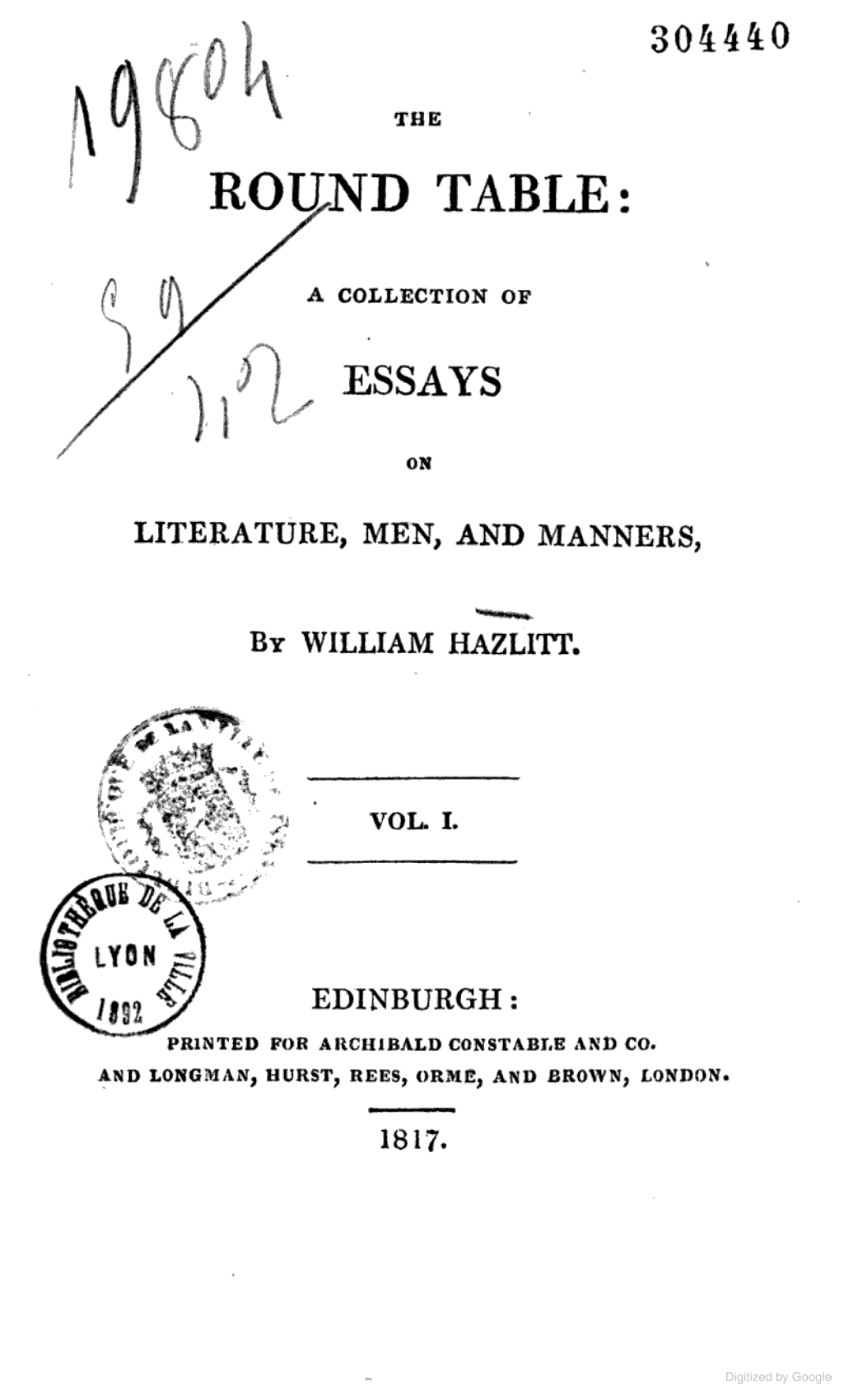
- Author: William Hazlitt and Leigh Hunt
- Language: English
- Genre: Cultural criticism, social criticism
- Publisher: Archibald Constable
- Publication date: 1817
- Publication place: England
- Preceded by: Memoirs of the Life of Thomas Holcroft
- Followed by: Characters of Shakespear's Plays

The Round Table is a collection of essays by William Hazlitt and Leigh Hunt published in 1817. Hazlitt contributed 40 essays, while Hunt submitted 12.

== Background ==
The content of The Round Table was mostly taken from Hunt and Hazlitt's contributions to The Examiner, a newspaper which Hunt edited. The material for the first volume was sent to the printer as a collection of newspaper cuttings. The process of publishing the collection had begun in late 1815, but much of the following year was lost to delays caused by its Edinburgh-based publisher, Archibald Constable, who doubted that a collection of newspaper articles would have much success.

The two volumes were finally published on 14 February 1817, and were sold at the price of fourteen shillings. Sales were slow, and the text was not reprinted during Hazlitt's lifetime. The essays covered subjects such as art, literature and theatre, and Hunt contributed several essays about ordinary subjects such as washerwomen and the joys of spending time by the fireside.

== Reception ==
The Round Table was received favourably by the poet John Keats. As with many of Hazlitt's works, it received a very negative assessment from the Quarterly Review. In appraising the work, the reviewers deliberately confused the lighthearted essays written by Hunt with those by Hazlitt. Hunt's essays—particularly the chapter on washerwomen—would be derided by the Quarterly Review and Blackwood's Magazine for years after The Round Table's publication.
