= Political Essays =

Political Essays, with Sketches of Public Characters
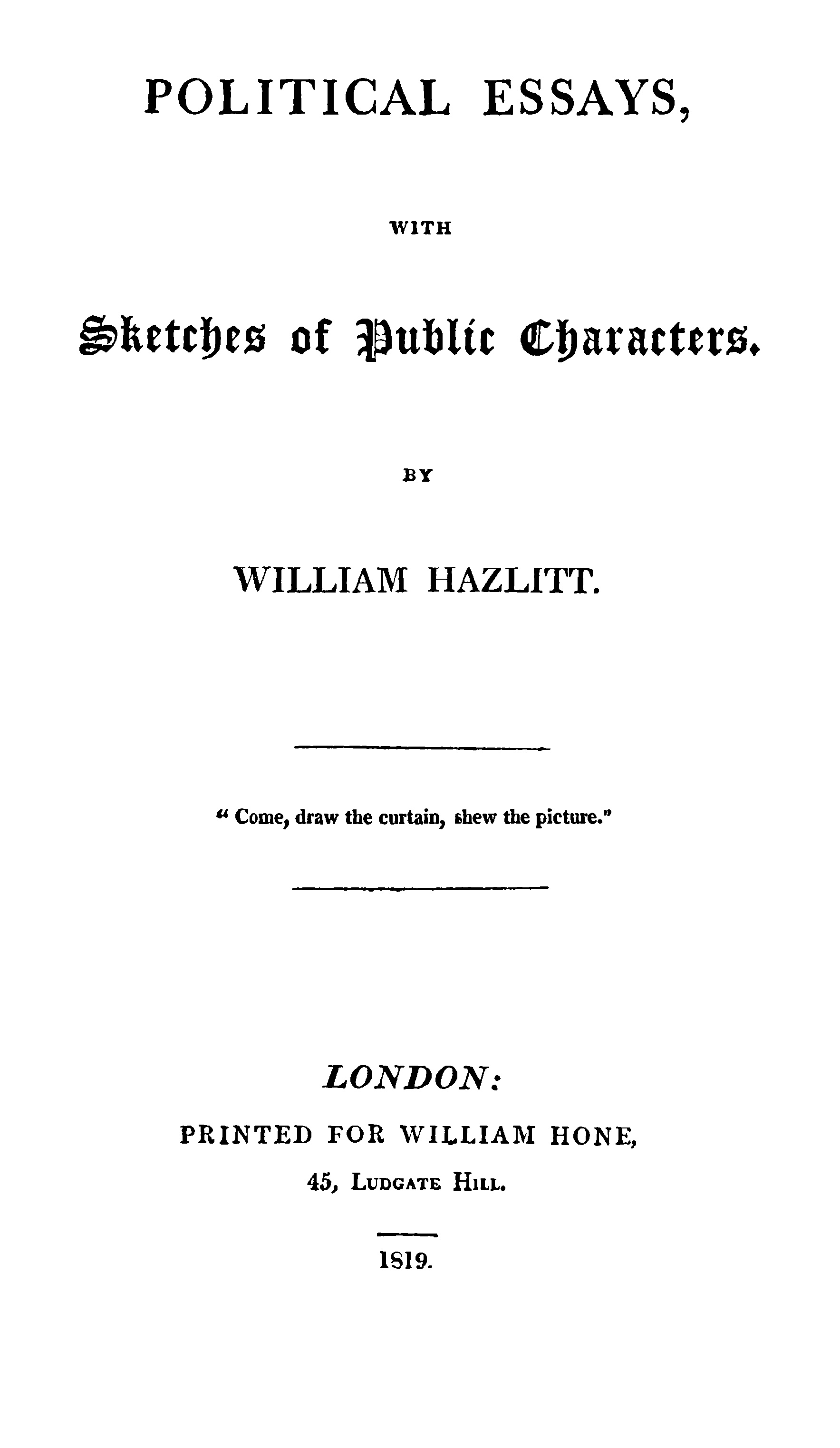
- Title page of Political Essays, 1st edition
- Author: William Hazlitt
- Language: English
- Genre: Political journalism, social criticism
- Publisher: William Hone
- Publication date: 14 August 1819
- Publication place: England
- OCLC: 3137957
- Preceded by: Lectures on the English Comic Writers
- Followed by: Lectures Chiefly on the Dramatic Literature of the Age of Elizabeth

Political Essays, with Sketches of Public Characters is a collection of essays by William Hazlitt, an English political journalist and cultural critic. Published in 1819, two days before the Peterloo Massacre, the work spans the final years of the Napoleonic Wars and the social and economic strife that followed. Included are attacks on monarchy, defences of Napoleon, and critical essays on Samuel Taylor Coleridge, Robert Southey, and Edmund Burke. The collection compiles Hazlitt's political writings, drawn largely from his newspaper articles.

== Background ==
Hazlitt was electorally disenfranchised for most of his life, except the six-year period before 1819, in which he was eligible to vote in Westminster. Many of Hazlitt's most political writings stem from this period.

William Hone, publisher of the Political Essays, was a radical publisher, better-known for publishing "crude political squibs". Hone contracted Hazlitt on 25 January 1819, and published Political Essays on 14 August 1819. For the critic Stanley Jones, the association with Hone reflects the "relatively downmarket" nature of the text. Whereas for Tom Paulin, the book "draws sustenance" from the Hone connection, which Hazlitt "obviously welcomed".

Political Essays contains nineteen pieces originally published in The Examiner, and is dedicated to The Examiner's publisher, John Hunt. For Paulin, this dedication represents "a public affirmation of [Hazlitt's] friendship with one of London's leading liberal reformers." The proximity of this dedication to Hone's name on the title page, for Paulin, marks the book's location in a "collaborative radical network".

== Content ==
For Paul Hamilton, the aim of Political Essays was to combat the reactionary "superstitions, prejudices, traditions, laws, usages" which are (quoting Hazlitt's preface) "enshrined in the very idioms of language". With such a shapeless opposition, Hazlitt's writing is "of necessity various and miscellaneous". In this, Hamilton identifies two key principles in Hazlitt's cause: the right to self-government, and the natural disinterestedness of the human mind. The appearance of the second principle, throughout such a miscellaneous collection of writings, is an assertion of its fundamental importance.

Hazlitt's essays had appeared in periodicals of the liberal "middling sort", and for Gilmartin their author was "removed from the day-to-day activity of political organization" associated with writer-publishers such as William Cobbett and Thomas Wooler. Nonetheless, the periodical essay had a "dynamic presence in radical print culture", and Hazlitt made use of "vigorous and direct address", "self-dramatization", "irony and disguise", and "rapid and improvised movement through a range of topical and occasional matter". Essays such as "What Is the People?" and Hazlitt's review of Robert Southey's Letter to William Smith display the "forthright manner" and "vernacular radical journalism" associated with William Cobbett.

More broadly, literary critics have identified the "flexible critical method that exploited paradox and contradiction" developed by Hazlitt. The placement of Hazlitt's writing within contemporary genres has also been an area of critical discussion. For E. P. Thompson, Hazlitt was "the most 'Jacobin' of the middle-class radicals", with Political Essays aimed "not towards the popular, but towards the polite culture of his time". Hazlitt's style, "with its sustained and controlled rhythms, and its antithetical movements", place Hazlitt in "the polite culture of the essayist". These antitheses and contradictions have complicated the interpretation of Hazlitt's political writing: disinterestedness, power and consistency emerge as themes. Critics have also noted that Hazlitt's political writing is distinguished by an "antagonistic" manner focused on attacking Hazlitt's enemies, rather than the "associative" writing of other radicals which focused on political movements and the progress of parliamentary reform. Enemies attacked in Political Essays include the Duke of Wellington, Robert Southey, Samuel Taylor Coleridge, Lord Castlereagh, Edmund Burke, William Pitt and Thomas Malthus.

== Reception ==
The immediate reception of Political Essays was, to quote Duncan Wu, "disappointing". Sales were slow, and few contemporary politicians mention the work in their private writings. Later critics such as Herschel Baker in 1962 found the volume "angry and uneven".

Wu describes Political Essays as "one of Hazlitt's best" works, which "attracts less attention than it deserves". For Paulin, Political Essays is "angry, rough, vigorous, wild". For Kevin Gilmartin, the book "gathers some of Hazlitt's most energetic political writing". Jonathan Bate describes Political Essays as:

a fine introduction to the sharpness of Hazlitt's prose and the spice of his convictions—his faith in Napoleon, his hatred for Pitt, his uneasy admiration of Burke, his dismay at the apostasy of Coleridge and Southey
