= William Hazlitt =

19th-century English essayist and critic (1778–1830)

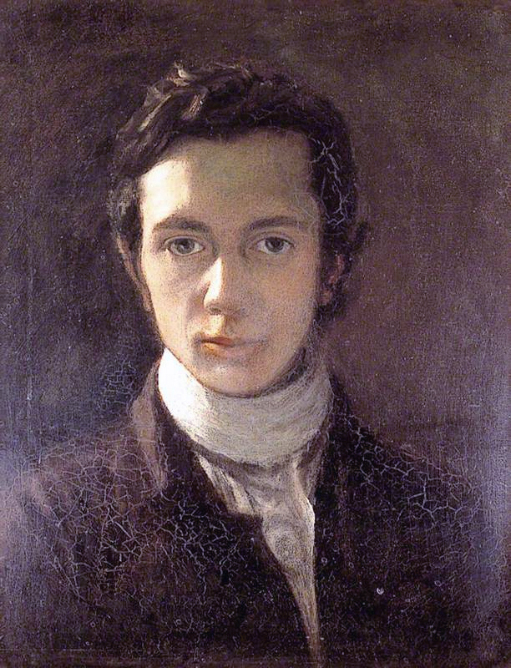
- Self-portrait from about 1802
- Born: 10 April 1778; Maidstone, Kent, England
- Died: 18 September 1830 (aged 52); Soho, London, England
- Education: New College at Hackney
- Occupations: Essayist; literary critic; painter; philosopher
- Spouses: Sarah Stoddart (m. 1808; div. 1822); Isabella Bridgewater (m. 1824)
- Children: William Hazlitt
- Parent: William Hazlitt (father)
- Relatives: John Hazlitt (brother); William Carew Hazlitt (grandson); Charles Upham (great-grandnephew)
- Writing career
- Notable works: Characters of Shakespear's Plays; Table-Talk; The Spirit of the Age
- Movement: Romanticism

William Hazlitt (10 April 1778 – 18 September 1830) was an English essayist, drama and literary critic, painter, social commentator, and philosopher. He is now considered one of the greatest critics and essayists in the history of the English language, placed in the company of Samuel Johnson and George Orwell. He is also acknowledged as the finest art critic of his age. Despite his high standing among historians of literature and art, his work is currently little read and mostly out of print.

During his lifetime he befriended many people who are now part of the 19th-century literary canon, including Charles and Mary Lamb, Stendhal, Samuel Taylor Coleridge, William Wordsworth, and John Keats.

== Life and works ==
=== Background ===
The family of Hazlitt's father were Irish Protestants who moved from the county of Antrim to Tipperary in the early 18th century. Also named William Hazlitt, Hazlitt's father attended the University of Glasgow (where he was taught by Adam Smith), receiving a master's degree in 1760. Not entirely satisfied with his Presbyterian faith, he became a Unitarian minister in England. In 1764, he became pastor at Wisbech in Cambridgeshire, where in 1766 he married Grace Loftus, daughter of a recently deceased ironmonger. Of their many children, only three survived infancy. The first of these, John (later known as a portrait painter), was born in 1767 at Marshfield in Gloucestershire, where the Reverend William Hazlitt had accepted a new pastorate after his marriage. In 1770, the elder Hazlitt accepted yet another position and moved with his family to Maidstone, Kent, where his first and only surviving daughter, Margaret (usually known as "Peggy"), was born that same year.

=== Childhood, education, young philosopher (1778–1797) ===
==== Childhood ====
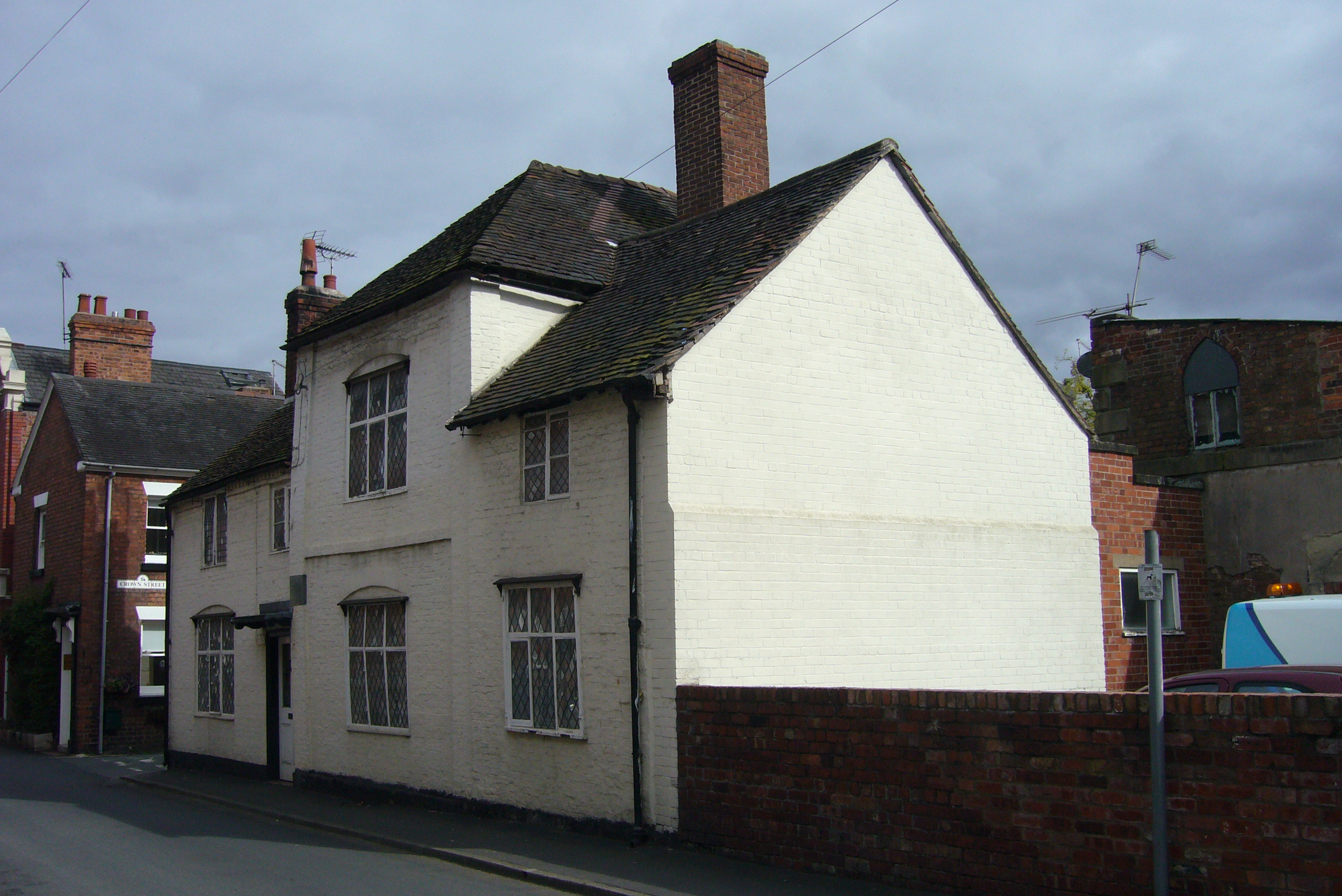
House in Wem, Shropshire, where the Reverend William Hazlitt and his family lived between 1787 and 1813

William, the youngest of the surviving Hazlitt children, was born in Mitre Lane, Maidstone, in 1778. In 1780, when he was two, his family began a nomadic lifestyle that was to last several years. From Maidstone his father took them to Bandon, County Cork, Ireland; and from Bandon in 1783 to the United States, where the elder Hazlitt preached, lectured, and sought a ministerial call to a liberal congregation. His efforts to obtain a post did not meet with success, although he did exert a certain influence on the founding of the first Unitarian church in Boston. In 1786–87, the family returned to England and settled in Wem, in Shropshire. Hazlitt would remember little of his years in America, save the taste of barberries.

==== Education ====
Hazlitt was educated at home and at a local school. At age 13 he had the satisfaction of seeing his writing appear in print for the first time, when the Shrewsbury Chronicle published his letter (July 1791) condemning the riots in Birmingham over Joseph Priestley's support for the French Revolution. In 1793, his father sent him to a Unitarian seminary on what was then the outskirts of London, the New College at Hackney (commonly referred to as Hackney College). The schooling he received there, though relatively brief, approximately two years, made a deep and abiding impression on Hazlitt.

The curriculum at Hackney was very broad, including a grounding in the Greek and Latin classics, mathematics, history, government, science, and, of course, religion. Much of his education there was along traditional lines; however, the tutelage having been strongly influenced by eminent Dissenting thinkers of the day like Richard Price and Joseph Priestley, there was also much that was nonconformist. Priestley, whom Hazlitt had read and who was also one of his teachers, was an impassioned commentator on political issues of the day. This, along with the turmoil in the wake of the French Revolution, sparked in Hazlitt and his classmates lively debates on these issues, as they saw their world being transformed around them.

Changes were taking place within the young Hazlitt as well. While, out of respect for his father, Hazlitt never openly broke with his religion, he suffered a loss of faith, and left Hackney before completing his preparation for the ministry.

Although Hazlitt rejected the Unitarian theology, his time at Hackney left him with much more than religious scepticism. He had read widely and formed habits of independent thought and respect for the truth that would remain with him for life. He had thoroughly absorbed a belief in liberty and the rights of man, and confidence in the idea that the mind was an active force which, by disseminating knowledge in both the sciences and the arts, could reinforce the natural tendency in humanity towards good. The school had impressed upon him the importance of the individual's ability, working both alone and within a mutually supportive community, to effect beneficial change by adhering to strongly held principles. The belief of many Unitarian thinkers in the natural disinterestedness of the human mind had also laid a foundation for the young Hazlitt's own philosophical explorations along those lines. And, though harsh experience and disillusionment later compelled him to qualify some of his early ideas about human nature, he was left with a hatred of tyranny and persecution that he retained to his dying days, as expressed a quarter-century afterward in the retrospective summing up of his political stance in his 1819 collection of Political Essays: "I have a hatred of tyranny, and a contempt for its tools ... I cannot sit quietly down under the claims of barefaced power, and I have tried to expose the little arts of sophistry by which they are defended."

==== Young philosopher ====
Returning home, around 1795, his thoughts were directed into more secular channels, encompassing not only politics but, increasingly, modern philosophy, which he had begun to read with fascination at Hackney. In September 1794, he had met William Godwin, the reformist thinker whose recently published Political Justice had taken English intellectual circles by storm. Hazlitt was never to feel entirely in sympathy with Godwin's philosophy, but it gave him much food for thought. He spent much of his time at home in an intensive study of English, Scottish, and Irish thinkers like John Locke, David Hartley, George Berkeley, and David Hume, together with French thinkers like Claude Adrien Helvétius, Étienne Bonnot de Condillac, the Marquis de Condorcet, and Baron d'Holbach. From this point onwards, Hazlitt's goal was to become a philosopher. His intense studies focused on man as a social and political animal and, in particular, on the philosophy of mind, a discipline that would later be called psychology.

It was in this period also that he came across Jean-Jacques Rousseau, who became one of the most important influences on the budding philosopher's thinking. He also familiarized himself with the works of Edmund Burke, whose writing style impressed him enormously. Hazlitt then set about working out a treatise, in painstaking detail, on the "natural disinterestedness of the human mind". It was Hazlitt's intention to disprove the notion that man is naturally selfish (benevolent actions being rationally modified selfishness, ideally made habitual), a premise fundamental to much of the moral philosophy of Hazlitt's day. The treatise was finally published only in 1805. In the meantime the scope of his reading had broadened and new circumstances had altered the course of his career. Yet, to the end of his life, he would consider himself a philosopher.

Around 1796, Hazlitt found new inspiration and encouragement from Joseph Fawcett, a retired clergyman and prominent reformer, whose enormous breadth of taste left the young thinker awestruck. From Fawcett, in the words of biographer Ralph Wardle, he imbibed a love for "good fiction and impassioned writing", Fawcett being "a man of keen intelligence who did not scorn the products of the imagination or apologize for his tastes". With him, Hazlitt not only discussed the radical thinkers of their day, but ranged comprehensively over all kinds of literature, from John Milton's Paradise Lost to Laurence Sterne's Tristram Shandy. This background is important for understanding the breadth and depth of Hazlitt's own taste in his later critical writings.

Aside from residing with his father as he strove to find his own voice and work out his philosophical ideas, Hazlitt also stayed over with his older brother John, who had studied under Joshua Reynolds and was following a career as a portrait painter. He also spent evenings with delight in London's theatrical world, an aesthetic experience that would prove, somewhat later, of seminal importance to his mature critical work. In large part, however, Hazlitt was then living a decidedly contemplative existence, one somewhat frustrated by his failure to express on paper the thoughts and feelings that were churning within him. It was at this juncture that Hazlitt met Samuel Taylor Coleridge. This encounter, a life-changing event, was subsequently to exercise a profound influence on his writing career that, in retrospect, Hazlitt regarded as greater than any other.

=== Poetry, painting, and marriage (1798–1812) ===
==== "First Acquaintance with Poets" ====
On 14 January 1798, Hazlitt, in what was to prove a turning point in his life, encountered Coleridge as the latter preached at the Unitarian chapel in Shrewsbury. A minister at the time, Coleridge had as yet none of the fame that would later accrue to him as a poet, critic, and philosopher. Hazlitt, like Thomas de Quincey and many others afterwards, was swept off his feet by Coleridge's dazzlingly erudite eloquence. "I could not have been more delighted if I had heard the music of the spheres", he wrote years later in his essay "My First Acquaintance with Poets". It was, he added, as if "Poetry and Philosophy had met together. Truth and Genius had embraced, under the eye and with the sanction of Religion." Long after they had parted ways, Hazlitt would speak of Coleridge as "the only person I ever knew who answered to the idea of a man of genius". That Hazlitt learned to express his thoughts "in motley imagery or quaint allusion", that his understanding "ever found a language to express itself," was, he openly acknowledged, something he owed to Coleridge. For his part, Coleridge showed an interest in the younger man's germinating philosophical ideas, and offered encouragement.

In April, Hazlitt jumped at Coleridge's invitation to visit him at his residence in Nether Stowey, and that same day was taken to call in on William Wordsworth at his house in Alfoxton. Again, Hazlitt was enraptured. While he was not immediately struck by Wordsworth's appearance, in observing the cast of Wordsworth's eyes as they contemplated a sunset, he reflected, "With what eyes these poets see nature!" Given the opportunity to read the Lyrical Ballads in manuscript, Hazlitt saw that Wordsworth had the mind of a true poet, and "the sense of a new style and a new spirit in poetry came over me."

All three were fired by the ideals of liberty and the rights of man. Rambling across the countryside, they talked of poetry, philosophy, and the political movements that were shaking up the old order. This unity of spirit was not to last: Hazlitt himself would recall disagreeing with Wordsworth on the philosophical underpinnings of his projected poem The Recluse, just as he had earlier been amazed that Coleridge could dismiss David Hume, regarded as one of the greatest philosophers of that century, as a charlatan. Nonetheless, the experience impressed on the young Hazlitt, at 20, the sense that not only philosophy, to which he had devoted himself, but also poetry warranted appreciation for what it could teach, and the three-week visit stimulated him to pursue his own thinking and writing. Coleridge, on his part, using an archery metaphor, later revealed that he had been highly impressed by Hazlitt's promise as a thinker: "He sends well-headed and well-feathered Thoughts straight forwards to the mark with a Twang of the Bow-string."

==== Itinerant painter ====
Meanwhile, the fact remained that Hazlitt had chosen not to follow a pastoral vocation. Although he never abandoned his goal of writing a philosophical treatise on the disinterestedness of the human mind, it had to be put aside indefinitely. Still dependent on his father, he was now obliged to earn his own living. Artistic talent seemed to run in the family on his mother's side and, starting in 1798, he became increasingly fascinated by painting. His brother, John, had by now become a successful painter of miniature portraits. So it occurred to William that he might earn a living similarly, and he began to take lessons from John.

Hazlitt also visited various picture galleries, and he began to get work doing portraits, painting somewhat in the style of Rembrandt. In this fashion, he managed to make something of a living for a time, travelling back and forth between London and the country, wherever he could get work. By 1802, his work was considered good enough that a portrait he had recently painted of his father was accepted for exhibition by the Royal Academy.

Later in 1802, Hazlitt was commissioned to travel to Paris and copy several works of the Old Masters hanging in The Louvre. This was one of the great opportunities of his life. Over a period of three months, he spent long hours rapturously studying the gallery's collections, and hard thinking and close analysis would later inform a considerable body of his art criticism. He also happened to catch sight of Napoleon, a man he idolised as the rescuer of the common man from the oppression of royal "Legitimacy".

Back in England, Hazlitt again travelled up into the country, having obtained several commissions to paint portraits. One commission again proved fortunate, as it brought him back in touch with Coleridge and Wordsworth, both of whose portraits he painted, as well as one of Coleridge's son Hartley. Hazlitt aimed to create the best pictures he could, whether they flattered their subjects or not, and neither poet was satisfied with his result, though Wordsworth and their mutual friend Robert Southey considered his portrait of Coleridge a better likeness than one by the celebrated James Northcote.

Recourse to prostitutes was unexceptional among literary—and other—men of that period, and if Hazlitt was to differ from his contemporaries, the difference lay in his unabashed candour about such arrangements. Personally, he was rarely comfortable in middle- and upper-class female society, and, tormented by desires he later branded as "a perpetual clog and dead-weight upon the reason," he made an overture to a local woman while visiting the Lake District with Coleridge. He had however grossly misread her intentions and an altercation broke out which led to his precipitous retreat from the town under cover of darkness. This public blunder placed a further strain on his relations with both Coleridge and Wordsworth, which were already fraying for other reasons.

==== Marriage, family, and friends ====
On 22 March 1803, at a London dinner party held by William Godwin, Hazlitt met Charles Lamb and his sister Mary. A mutual sympathy sprang up immediately between William and Charles, and they became fast friends. Their friendship, though sometimes strained by Hazlitt's difficult ways, lasted until the end of Hazlitt's life. He was fond of Mary as well, and—ironically in view of her intermittent fits of insanity—he considered her the most reasonable woman he had ever met, no small compliment coming from a man whose view of women at times took a misogynistic turn. Hazlitt frequented the society of the Lambs for the next several years, from 1806 often attending their famous "Wednesdays" and later "Thursdays" literary salons.

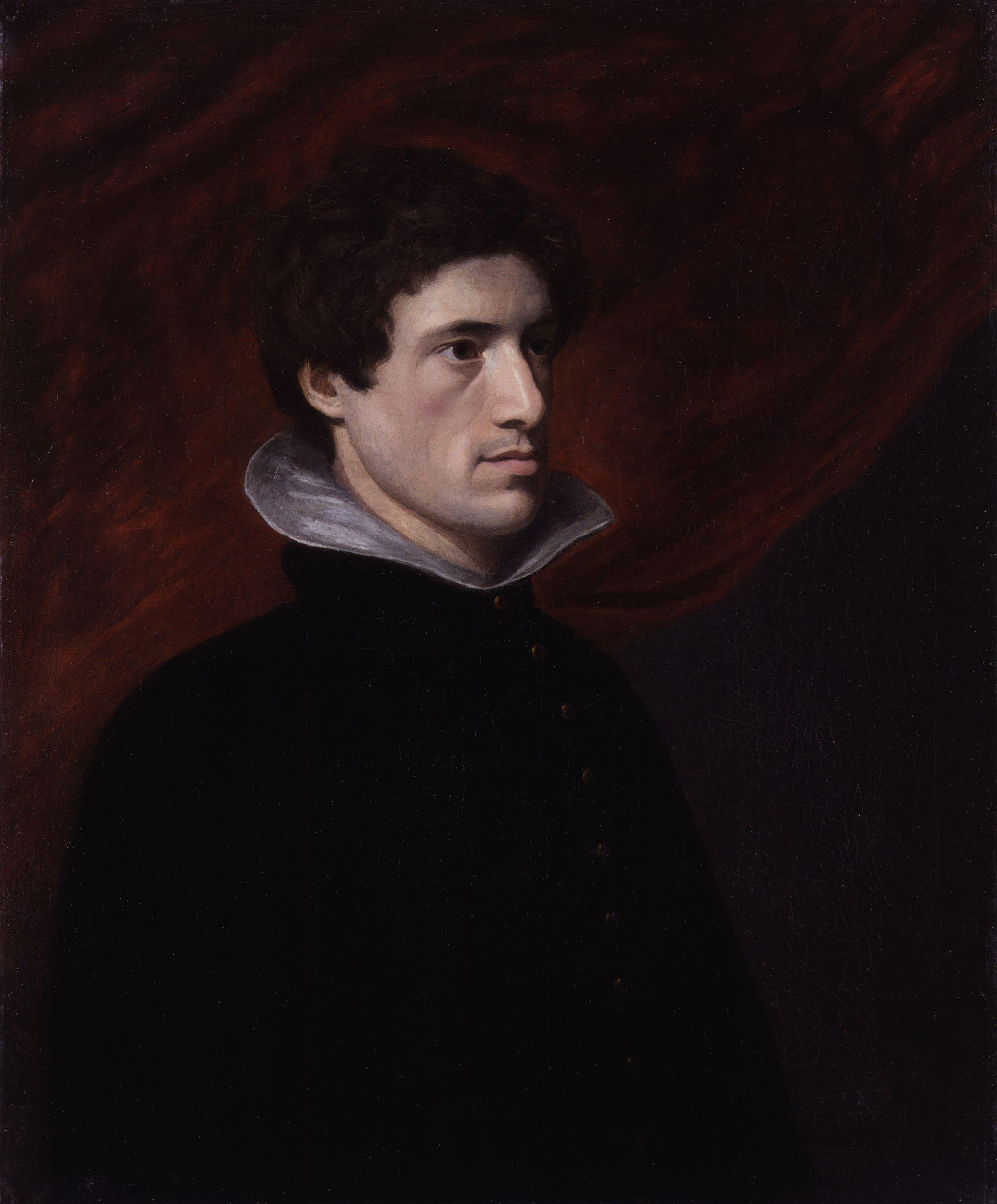
Portrait of Charles Lamb by William Hazlitt, 1804

With few commissions for painting, Hazlitt seized the opportunity to ready for publication his philosophical treatise, which, according to his son, he had completed by 1803. Godwin intervened to help him find a publisher, and the work, An Essay on the Principles of Human Action: Being an Argument in favour of the Natural Disinterestedness of the Human Mind, was printed in a limited edition of 250 copies by Joseph Johnson on 19 July 1805. This gained him little notice as an original thinker, and no money. Although the treatise he valued above anything else he wrote was never, at least in his own lifetime, recognised for what he believed was its true worth, it brought him attention as one who had a grasp of contemporary philosophy. He therefore was commissioned to abridge and write a preface to a now obscure work of mental philosophy, The Light of Nature Pursued by Abraham Tucker (originally published in seven volumes from 1765 to 1777), which appeared in 1807 and may have had some influence on his own later thinking.

Slowly Hazlitt began to find enough work to eke out a bare living. His outrage at events then taking place in English politics in reaction to Napoleon's wars led to his writing and publishing, at his own expense (though he had almost no money), a political pamphlet, Free Thoughts on Public Affairs (1806), an attempt to mediate between private economic interests and a national application of the thesis of his Essay that human motivation is not, inherently, entirely selfish.

Hazlitt also contributed three letters to William Cobbett's Weekly Political Register at this time, all scathing critiques of Thomas Malthus's Essay on the Principle of Population (1798 and later editions). Here he replaced the dense, abstruse manner of his philosophical work with the trenchant prose style that was to be the hallmark of his later essays. Hazlitt's philippic, dismissing Malthus's argument on population limits as sycophantic rhetoric to flatter the rich, since large swathes of uncultivated land lay all round England, has been hailed as "the most substantial, comprehensive, and brilliant of the Romantic ripostes to Malthus". Also in 1807, Hazlitt undertook a compilation of parliamentary speeches, published that year as The Eloquence of the British Senate. In the prefaces to the speeches, he began to show a skill he would later develop to perfection, the art of the pithy character sketch. He was able to find more work as a portrait painter as well.

In May 1808, Hazlitt married Sarah Stoddart, a friend of Mary Lamb and sister of John Stoddart, a journalist who became editor of The Times newspaper in 1814. Shortly before the wedding, John Stoddart established a trust into which he began paying £100 per year, for the benefit of Hazlitt and his wife—this was a very generous gesture, but Hazlitt detested being supported by his brother-in-law, whose political beliefs he despised. This union was not a love match, and incompatibilities would later drive the couple apart; yet, for a while, it seemed to work well enough, and their initial behavior was both playful and affectionate. Miss Stoddart, an unconventional woman, accepted Hazlitt and tolerated his eccentricities just as he, with his own somewhat offbeat individualism, accepted her. Together they made an agreeable social foursome with the Lambs, who visited them when they set up a household in Winterslow, a village a few miles from Salisbury, Wiltshire, in southern England. The couple had three sons over the next few years, Only one of their children, William, born in 1811, survived infancy. (He in turn fathered William Carew Hazlitt.)

As the head of a family, Hazlitt was now more than ever in need of money. Through William Godwin, with whom he was frequently in touch, he obtained a commission to write an English grammar, published on 11 November 1809 as A New and Improved Grammar of the English Tongue. Another project that came his way was the work that was published as Memoirs of the Late Thomas Holcroft, a compilation of autobiographical writing by the recently deceased playwright, novelist, and radical political activist, together with additional material by Hazlitt himself. Though completed in 1810, this work did not see the light of day until 1816, and so provided no financial gain to satisfy the needs of a young husband and father. Hazlitt in the meantime had not forsaken his painterly ambitions. His environs at Winterslow afforded him opportunities for landscape painting, and he spent considerable time in London procuring commissions for portraits.

In January 1812 Hazlitt embarked on a sometime career as a lecturer, in this first instance by delivering a series of talks on the British philosophers at the Russell Institution in London. A central thesis of the talks was that Thomas Hobbes, rather than John Locke, had laid the foundations of modern philosophy. After a shaky beginning, Hazlitt attracted some attention—and some much-needed money—by these lectures, and they provided him with an opportunity to expound some of his own ideas.

The year 1812 seems to have been the last in which Hazlitt persisted seriously in his ambition to make a career as a painter. Although he had demonstrated some talent, the results of his most impassioned efforts always fell far short of the very standards he had set by comparing his own work with the productions of such masters as Rembrandt, Titian, and Raphael. It did not help that, when painting commissioned portraits, he refused to sacrifice his artistic integrity to the temptation to flatter his subjects for remunerative gain. The results, not infrequently, failed to please their subjects, and he consequently failed to build a clientele.

But other opportunities awaited him.

=== Journalist, essayist, and Liber Amoris (1812–1823) ===
==== Journalist ====
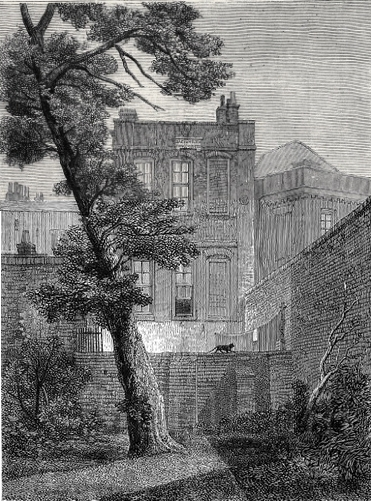
The back of No. 19, York Street (1848). In 1651 John Milton moved into a "pretty garden-house" in Petty France. He lived there until the Restoration. Later it became No. 19 York Street, belonged to Jeremy Bentham, was occupied successively by James Mill and William Hazlitt, and was demolished in 1877.

In October 1812, Hazlitt was hired by The Morning Chronicle as a parliamentary reporter. Soon he met John Hunt, publisher of The Examiner, and his younger brother Leigh Hunt, the poet and essayist, who edited the weekly paper. Hazlitt admired both as champions of liberty, and befriended especially the younger Hunt, who found work for him. He began to contribute miscellaneous essays to The Examiner in 1813, and the scope of his work for the Chronicle was expanded to include drama criticism, literary criticism, and political essays. In 1814, The Champion was added to the list of periodicals that accepted Hazlitt's by-now profuse output of literary and political criticism. A critique of Joshua Reynolds' theories about art appeared there as well, one of Hazlitt's major forays into art criticism.

Having by 1814 become established as a journalist, Hazlitt had begun to earn a satisfactory living. A year earlier, with the prospect of a steady income, he had moved his family to a house at 19 York Street, Westminster, which had been occupied by the poet John Milton, whom Hazlitt admired above all English poets except Shakespeare. As it happened, Hazlitt's landlord was the philosopher and social reformer Jeremy Bentham. Hazlitt was to write extensively about both Milton and Bentham over the next few years.

His circle of friends expanded, though he never seems to have been particularly close with any but the Lambs and to an extent Leigh Hunt and the painter Benjamin Robert Haydon. His low tolerance for any who, he thought, had abandoned the cause of liberty, along with his frequent outspokenness, even tactlessness, in social situations made it difficult for many to feel close to him, and at times he tried the patience of even Charles Lamb. In The Examiner in late 1814, Hazlitt was the first to provide a critique of Wordsworth's poem The Excursion (Hazlitt's review appeared weeks before Francis Jeffrey's notorious dismissal of the poem with the words "This will never do"). He lavished extreme praise on the poet—and equally extreme censure. While praising the poem's sublimity and intellectual power, he took to task the intrusive egotism of its author. Clothing landscape and incident with the poet's personal thoughts and feelings suited this new sort of poetry very well; but his abstract philosophical musing too often steered the poem into didacticism, a leaden counterweight to its more imaginative flights. Wordsworth, who seems to have been unable to tolerate anything less than unqualified praise, was enraged, and relations between the two became cooler than ever.

Though Hazlitt continued to think of himself as a "metaphysician", he began to feel comfortable in the role of journalist. His self-esteem received an added boost when he was invited to contribute to the quarterly The Edinburgh Review (his contributions, beginning in early 1815, were frequent and regular for some years), the most distinguished periodical on the Whig side of the political fence (its rival The Quarterly Review occupied the Tory side). Writing for so highly respected a publication was considered a major step up from writing for weekly papers, and Hazlitt was proud of this connection.

On 18 June 1815, Napoleon was defeated at Waterloo. Having idolised Napoleon for years, Hazlitt took it as a personal blow. The event seemed to him to mark the end of hope for the common man against the oppression of "legitimate" monarchy. Profoundly depressed, he took up heavy drinking and was reported to have walked around unshaven and unwashed for weeks. He idolised and spoiled his son, William Jr., but in most respects his household grew increasingly disordered over the following year: his marriage deteriorated, and he spent more and more time away from home. His part-time work as a drama critic provided him with an excuse to spend his evenings at the theatre. Afterwards he would then tarry with those friends who could tolerate his irascibility, the number of whom dwindled as a result of his occasionally outrageous behaviour.

Hazlitt continued to produce articles on miscellaneous topics for The Examiner and other periodicals, including political diatribes against any who he felt ignored or minimised the needs and rights of the common man. Defection from the cause of liberty had become easier in light of the oppressive political atmosphere in England at that time, in reaction to the French Revolution and the Napoleonic Wars. The Hunts were his primary allies in opposing this tendency. Lamb, who tried to remain uninvolved politically, tolerated his abrasiveness, and that friendship managed to survive, if only just barely in the face of Hazlitt's growing bitterness, short temper, and propensity for hurling invective at friends and foes alike.

For relief from all that weighed on his mind, Hazlitt became a passionate player at a kind of racquet ball similar to the game of Fives (a type of handball of which he was a fan) in that it was played against a wall. As his friend William Bewick observed on one occasion, he competed with savage intensity, dashing around the court like a madman, drenched in sweat, and was accounted a good player. More than just a distraction from his woes, his devotion to this pastime led to musings on the value of competitive sports and on human skill in general, expressed in writings like his notice of the "Death of John Cavanagh" (a celebrated Fives player) in The Examiner on 9 February 1817, and the essay "The Indian Jugglers" in Table-Talk (1821).

Early in 1817, forty of Hazlitt's essays that had appeared in The Examiner in a regular column called "The Round Table", along with a dozen pieces by Leigh Hunt in the same series, was collected in book form. Hazlitt's contributions to The Round Table were written somewhat in the manner of the periodical essays of the day, a genre defined by such eighteenth-century magazines as The Tatler and The Spectator.

The far-ranging eclectic variety of the topics treated would typify his output in succeeding years: Shakespeare ("On the Midsummer Night's Dream"), Milton ("On Milton's Lycidas"), art criticism ("On Hogarth's Marriage a-la-mode"), aesthetics ("On Beauty"), drama criticism ("On Mr. Kean's Iago"; Hazlitt was the first critic to champion the acting talent of Edmund Kean), social criticism ("On the Tendency of Sects", "On the Causes of Methodism", "On Different Sorts of Fame").

There was an article on The Tatler itself. Mostly his political commentary was reserved for other vehicles, but included was a "Character of the Late Mr. Pitt", a scathing characterisation of the recently deceased former Prime Minister. Written in 1806, Hazlitt liked it well enough to have already had it printed twice before (and it would appear again in a collection of political essays in 1819).

Some essays blend Hazlitt's social and psychological observations in a calculatedly thought-provoking way, presenting to the reader the "paradoxes" of human nature. The first of the collected essays, "On the Love of Life", explains, "It is our intention, in the course of these papers, occasionally to expose certain vulgar errors, which have crept into our reasonings on men and manners.... The love of life is ... in general, the effect not of our enjoyments, but of our passions".

Again, in "On Pedantry", Hazlitt declares that "The power of attaching an interest to the most trifling or painful pursuits ... is one of the greatest happinesses of our nature". In "On Different Sorts of Fame", "In proportion as men can command the immediate and vulgar applause of others, they become indifferent to that which is remote and difficult of attainment". And in "On Good-Nature", "Good nature, or what is often considered as such, is the most selfish of all the virtues...."

Many of the components of Hazlitt's style begin to take shape in these Round Table essays. Some of his "paradoxes" are so hyperbolic as to shock when encountered out of context: "All country people hate each other", for example, from the second part of "On Mr. Wordsworth's Excursion". He interweaves quotations from literature old and new, helping drive his points home with concentrated allusiveness and wielded extraordinarily efficiently as a critical instrument. Yet, although his use of quotations is (as many critics have felt) as fine as any author's has ever been, all too often he gets the quotes wrong. In one of his essays on Wordsworth he misquotes Wordsworth himself:

Though nothing can bring back the hour
Of glory in the grass, of splendour in the flower....
(See Ode: Intimations of Immortality from Recollections of Early Childhood.)

Though Hazlitt was still following the model of the older periodical essayists, these quirks, together with his keen social and psychological insights, began here to coalesce into a style very much his own.

==== Success—and trouble ====
In the meantime, Hazlitt's marriage continued its downward spiral; he was writing furiously for several periodicals to make ends meet; waiting so far in vain for the collection The Round Table to be issued as a book (which it finally was in February 1817); suffering bouts of illness; and making enemies by his venomous political diatribes. He found relief by a change of course, shifting the focus of his analysis from the acting of Shakespeare's plays to the substance of the works themselves. The result was a collection of critical essays entitled Characters of Shakespear's Plays (1817).

His approach was something new. There had been criticisms of Shakespeare before, but either they were not comprehensive or they were not aimed at the general reading public. As Ralph Wardle put it, before Hazlitt wrote this book, "no one had ever attempted a comprehensive study of all of Shakespeare, play by play, that readers could read and reread with pleasure as a guide to their understanding and appreciation". Somewhat loosely organised, and even rambling, the studies offer personal appreciations of the plays that are unashamedly enthusiastic. Hazlitt does not present a measured account of the plays' strengths and weaknesses, as did Dr. Johnson, or view them in terms of a "mystical" theory, as Hazlitt thought his contemporary A.W. Schlegel did (though he approves of many of Schlegel's judgements and quotes him liberally). Without apology, he addresses his readers as fellow lovers of Shakespeare and shares with them the beauties of what he thought the finest passages of the plays he liked best.

Readers took to it, the first edition selling out in six weeks. It received favourable reviews as well, not only by Leigh Hunt, whose bias as a close friend might be questioned, but also by Francis Jeffrey, the editor of The Edinburgh Review, a notice that Hazlitt greatly appreciated. Though he contributed to that quarterly, and corresponded with its editor on business, he had never met Jeffrey, and the two were in no sense personal friends. For Jeffrey, the book was not so much a learned study of Shakespeare's plays as much as a loving and eloquent appreciation, full of insight, which displayed "considerable originality and genius".

This critical and popular acclaim offered Hazlitt the prospect of getting out of debt, and allowed him to relax and bask in the light of his growing fame. In literary circles however, his reputation had been tarnished in the meantime: he had openly taken both Wordsworth and Coleridge to task on personal grounds and for failing to fulfill the promise of their earlier accomplishments, and both were apparently responsible for retaliatory rumours which seriously damaged Hazlitt's repute. And the worst was yet to come.

Nonetheless Hazlitt's satisfaction at the relief he gained from his financial woes was supplemented by the positive response his return to the lecture hall received. In early 1818 he delivered a series of talks on "the English Poets", from Chaucer to his own time. Though somewhat uneven in quality, his lectures were ultimately judged a success. In making arrangements for the lectures, he had met Peter George Patmore, Assistant Secretary of the Surrey Institution where the lectures were presented. Patmore soon became a friend as well as Hazlitt's confidant in the most troubled period of the latter's life.

The Surrey Institution lectures were printed in book form, followed by a collection of his drama criticism, A View of the English Stage, and the second edition of Characters of Shakespear's Plays. Hazlitt's career as a lecturer gained some momentum, and his growing popularity allowed him to get a collection of his political writings published as well, Political Essays, with Sketches of Public Characters. Lectures on "the English Comic Writers" soon followed, and these as well were published in book form. He then delivered lectures on dramatists contemporary with Shakespeare, which were published as Lectures on the Dramatic Literature of the Age of Elizabeth. This series of talks did not receive the public acclaim that his earlier lectures had, but were reviewed enthusiastically after they were published.

More trouble was brewing, however. Hazlitt was attacked brutally in The Quarterly Review and Blackwood's Magazine, both Tory publications. One Blackwood's article mocked him as "pimpled Hazlitt", accused him of ignorance, dishonesty, and obscenity, and incorporated vague physical threats. Though Hazlitt was rattled by these attacks, he sought legal advice and sued. The lawsuit against Blackwood's was finally settled out of court in his favour. Yet the attacks did not entirely cease. The Quarterly Review issued a review of Hazlitt's published lectures in which he was condemned as ignorant and his writing as unintelligible. Such partisan onslaughts brought spirited responses. One, unlike an earlier response to the Blackwood's attack that never saw the light of day, was published, as A Letter to William Gifford, Esq. (1819; Gifford was the editor of the Quarterly). The pamphlet, notable also for deploying the term ultracrepidarian, which Hazlitt himself may have coined, amounts to an apologia for his life and work thus far and showed he was well able to defend himself. Yet Hazlitt's attackers had done their damage. Not only was he personally shaken, he found it more difficult to have his works published, and once more he had to struggle for a living.

==== Solitude and infatuation ====
His lecturing in particular had drawn to Hazlitt a small group of admirers. Best known today is the poet John Keats, who not only attended the lectures but became Hazlitt's friend in this period. The two met in November 1816 through their mutual friend, the painter Benjamin Robert Haydon, and were last seen together in May 1820 at a dinner given by Haydon. In those few years before the poet's untimely death, the two read and admired each other's work, and Keats, as a younger man seeking guidance, solicited Hazlitt's advice on a course of reading and direction in his career. Some of Keats's writing, particularly his key idea of "negative capability", was influenced by the concept of "disinterested sympathy" he discovered in Hazlitt, whose work the poet devoured. Hazlitt, on his part, later wrote that of all the younger generation of poets, Keats showed the most promise, and he became Keats's first anthologist when he included several of Keats's poems in a collection of British poetry he compiled in 1824, three years after Keats's death.

Less well known today than Keats were others who loyally attended his lectures and constituted a small circle of admirers, such as the diarist and chronicler Henry Crabb Robinson and the novelist Mary Russell Mitford. But the rumours that had been spread demonising Hazlitt, along with the vilifications of the Tory press, not only hurt his pride but seriously obstructed his ability to earn a living. Income from his lectures had also proved insufficient to keep him afloat.

His thoughts drifted to gloom and misanthropy. His mood was not improved by the fact that by now there was no pretence of keeping up appearances: his marriage had failed. Years earlier he had grown resigned to the lack of love between him and Sarah. He had been visiting prostitutes and displayed more idealised amorous inclinations toward a number of women whose names are lost to history. Now in 1819, he was unable to pay the rent on their rooms at 19 York Street and his family were evicted. That was the last straw for Sarah, who moved into rooms with their son and broke with Hazlitt for good, forcing him to find his own accommodation. He would sometimes see his son and even his wife, with whom he remained on speaking terms, but they were effectively separated.

At this time Hazlitt would frequently retreat for long periods to the countryside he had grown to love since his marriage, staying at the "Winterslow Hut", a coaching inn at Winterslow, near a property his wife owned. This was both for solace and to concentrate on his writing. He explained his motivation as one of not wanting to withdraw completely but rather to become an invisible observer of society, "to become a silent spectator of the mighty scene of things ... to take a thoughtful, anxious interest in what is passing in the world, but not to feel the slightest inclination to make or meddle with it." Thus, for days on end, he would shut himself away and write for periodicals, including the recently re-established (1820) London Magazine, to which he contributed drama criticism and miscellaneous essays.

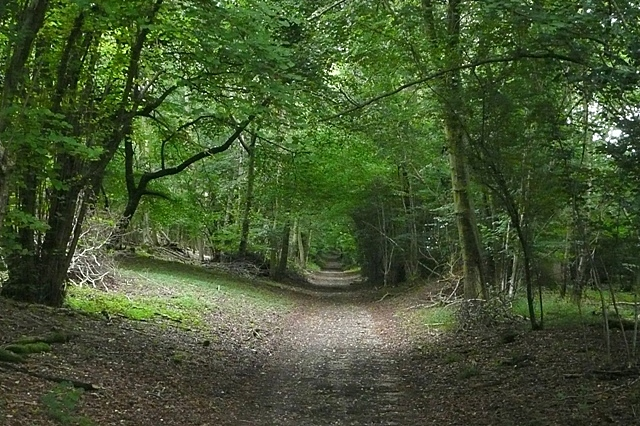
Roman road toward Middle Winterslow, and the route which Hazlitt preferred to take to the village

One idea that particularly bore fruit was that of a series of articles called "Table-Talk". (Many were written expressly for inclusion in the book of the same title, Table-Talk; or, Original Essays, which appeared in different editions and forms over the next few years.) These essays, structured in the loose manner of table talk, were written in the "familiar style" of the sort devised two centuries earlier by Montaigne, whom Hazlitt greatly admired. The personal "I" was now substituted for the editorial "we" in a careful remodulation of style that carried the spirit of these essays far from that of the typical eighteenth-century periodical essay, to which he had more closely adhered in The Round Table. In a preface to a later edition of Table-Talk, Hazlitt explained that in these essays he eschewed scholarly precision in favour of a combination of the "literary and the conversational". As in conversation among friends, the discussion would often branch off into topics related only in a general way to the main theme, "but which often threw a curious and striking light upon it, or upon human life in general".

In these essays, many of which have been acclaimed as among the finest in the language, Hazlitt weaves personal material into more general reflections on life, frequently bringing in long recollections of happy days of his years as an apprentice painter (as in "On the Pleasure of Painting", written in December 1820) as well as other pleasurable recollections of earlier years, "hours ... sacred to silence and to musing, to be treasured up in the memory, and to feed the source of smiling thoughts thereafter" ("On Going a Journey", written January 1822).

Hazlitt also had to spend time in London in these years. In another violent contrast, a London lodging house was the stage on which the worst crisis of his life was to play itself out.

In August 1820, a month after his father's death at the age of 83, he rented a couple of rooms in 9 Southampton Buildings in London from a tailor named Micaiah Walker. Walker's 19-year-old daughter Sarah, who helped with the housekeeping, would bring the new lodger his breakfast. Immediately, Hazlitt became infatuated with Miss Walker, more than 22 years his junior. (Before much longer, this "infatuation" turned into a protracted obsession.) His brief conversations with Walker cheered him and alleviated the loneliness that he felt from his failed marriage and the recent death of his father. He dreamed of marrying her, but that would require a divorce from Sarah Hazlitt—no easy matter. Finally, his wife agreed to grant him a Scottish divorce, which would allow him to remarry (as he could not had he been divorced in England).

Sarah Walker was, as some of Hazlitt's friends could see, a fairly ordinary girl. She had aspirations to better herself, and a famous author seemed like a prize catch, but she never really understood Hazlitt. When another lodger named Tomkins came along, she entered into a romantic entanglement with him as well, leading each of her suitors to believe he was the sole object of her affection. With vague words, she evaded absolute commitment until she could decide which she liked better or was the more advantageous catch.

Hazlitt discovered the truth about Tomkins, and from then on his jealousy and suspicions of Sarah Walker's real character afforded him little rest. For months, during the preparations for the divorce and as he tried to earn a living, he alternated between rage and despair, on the one hand, and the comforting if unrealistic thought that she was really "a good girl" and would accept him at last. The divorce was finalised on 17 July 1822, and Hazlitt returned to London to see his beloved—only to find her cold and resistant. They then become involved in angry altercations of jealousy and recrimination. And it was over, though Hazlitt could not for some time persuade himself to believe so. His mind nearly snapped. At his emotional nadir, he contemplated suicide.

It was with some difficulty that he eventually recovered his equilibrium. In order to ascertain Sarah's true character, he persuaded an acquaintance to take lodgings in the Walkers' building and attempt to seduce Sarah. Hazlitt's friend reported that the attempt seemed to be about to succeed, but she prevented him from taking the ultimate liberty. Her behaviour was as it had been with several other male lodgers, not only Hazlitt, who now concluded that he had been dealing with, rather than an "angel", an "impudent whore", an ordinary "lodging house decoy". Eventually, though Hazlitt could not know this, she had a child by Tomkins and moved in with him.

By pouring out his tale of woe to anyone he happened to meet (including his friends Peter George Patmore and James Sheridan Knowles), he was able to find a cathartic outlet for his misery. But catharsis was also provided by his recording the course of his love in a thinly disguised fictional account, published anonymously in May 1823 as Liber Amoris; or, The New Pygmalion. (Enough clues were present so that the identity of the writer did not remain hidden for long.)

Critics have been divided as to the literary merits of Liber Amoris, a deeply personal account of frustrated love that is quite unlike anything else Hazlitt ever wrote. Wardle suggests that it was compelling but marred by sickly sentimentality, and also proposes that Hazlitt might even have been anticipating some of the experiments in chronology made by later novelists.

One or two positive reviews appeared, such as the one in the Globe, 7 June 1823: "The Liber Amoris is unique in the English language; and as, possibly, the first book in its fervour, its vehemency, and its careless exposure of passion and weakness—of sentiments and sensations which the common race of mankind seek most studiously to mystify or conceal—that exhibits a portion of the most distinguishing characteristics of Rousseau, it ought to be generally praised".

However, such complimentary assessments were the rare exception. Whatever its ultimate merits, Liber Amoris provided ample ammunition for Hazlitt's detractors, and even some of his closest friends were scandalised. For months he did not even have contact with the Lambs. And the strait-laced Robinson found the book "disgusting", "nauseous and revolting", "low and gross and tedious and very offensive", believing that "it ought to exclude the author from all decent society". As ever, peace of mind proved elusive for William Hazlitt.

=== Return to philosophy, second marriage, and tour of Europe (1823–1825) ===
==== Philosopher, again ====
There were times in this turbulent period when Hazlitt could not focus on his work. But often, as in his self-imposed seclusion at Winterslow, he was able to achieve a "philosophic detachment", and he continued to turn out essays of remarkable variety and literary merit, most of them making up the two volumes of Table-Talk. (A number were saved for later publication in The Plain Speaker in 1826, while others remained uncollected.)

Some of these essays were in large part retrospectives on the author's own life ("On Reading Old Books" [1821], for example, along with others mentioned above). In others, he invites his readers to join him in gazing at the spectacle of human folly and perversity ("On Will-making" [1821], or "On Great and Little Things" [1821], for example). At times he scrutinises the subtle workings of the individual mind (as in "On Dreams" [1823]); or he invites us to laugh at harmless eccentricities of human nature ("On People with One Idea" [1821]).

Other essays bring into perspective the scope and limitations of the mind, as measured against the vastness of the universe and the extent of human history ("Why Distant Objects Please" [1821/2] and "On Antiquity" [1821] are only two of many). Several others scrutinise the manners and morals of the age (such as "On Vulgarity and Affectation", "On Patronage and Puffing", and "On Corporate Bodies" [all 1821]).

Many of these "Table-Talk" essays display Hazlitt's interest in genius and artistic creativity. There are specific instances of literary or art criticism (for example "On a Landscape of Nicolas Poussin" [1821] and "On Milton's Sonnets" [1822]) but also numerous investigations of the psychology of creativity and genius ("On Genius and Common Sense" [1821], "Whether Genius Is Conscious of Its Powers" [1823], and others). In his manner of exploring an idea by antitheses (for example, "On the Past and the Future" [1821], "On the Picturesque and Ideal" [1821]), he contrasts the utmost achievements of human mechanical skill with the nature of artistic creativity in "The Indian Jugglers" [1821].

Hazlitt's fascination with the extremes of human capability in any field led to his writing "The Fight" (published in the February 1822 New Monthly Magazine). This essay never appeared in the Table-Talk series or anywhere else in the author's lifetime. This direct, personal account of a prize fight, commingling refined literary allusions with popular slang, was controversial in its time as depicting too "low" a subject. Written at a dismal time in his life—Hazlitt's divorce was pending, and he was far from sure of being able to marry Sarah Walker—the article shows scarcely a trace of his agony. Not quite like any other essay by Hazlitt, it proved to be one of his most popular, was frequently reprinted after his death, and nearly two centuries later was judged to be "one of the most passionately written pieces of prose in the late Romantic period".

Another article written in this period, "On the Pleasure of Hating" (1823; included in The Plain Speaker), is on one level a pure outpouring of spleen, a distillation of all the bitterness of his life to that point. He links his own vitriol, however, to a strain of malignity at the core of human nature:

The pleasure of hating, like a poisonous mineral, eats into the heart of religion, and turns it to rankling spleen and bigotry; it makes patriotism an excuse for carrying fire, pestilence, and famine into other lands: it leaves to virtue nothing but the spirit of censoriousness, and a narrow, jealous, inquisitorial watchfulness over the actions and motives of others.

To one twentieth-century critic, Gregory Dart, this self-diagnosis by Hazlitt of his own misanthropic enmities was the sour and surreptitiously preserved offspring of Jacobinism. Hazlitt concludes his diatribe by refocusing on himself: "...have I not reason to hate and to despise myself? Indeed I do; and chiefly for not having hated and despised the world enough".

Not only do the "Table-Talk" essays frequently display "trenchant insights into human nature", they at times reflect on the vehicle of those insights and of the literary and art criticism that constitute some of the essays. "On Criticism" (1821) delves into the history and purposes of criticism itself; and "On Familiar Style" (1821 or 1822) reflexively explores at some length the principles behind its own composition, along with that of other essays of this kind by Hazlitt and some of his contemporaries, like Lamb and Cobbett.

In Table-Talk, Hazlitt had found the most congenial format for this thoughts and observations. A broad panorama of the triumphs and follies of humanity, an exploration of the quirks of the mind, of the nobility but more often the meanness and sheer malevolence of human nature, the collection was knit together by a web of self-consistent thinking, a skein of ideas woven from a lifetime of close reasoning on life, art, and literature. He illustrated his points with bright imagery and pointed analogies, among which were woven pithy quotations drawn from the history of English literature, primarily the poets, from Chaucer to his contemporaries Wordsworth, Byron, and Keats. Most often, he quoted his beloved Shakespeare and to a lesser extent Milton. As he explained in "On Familiar Style", he strove to fit the exact words to the things he wanted to express and often succeeded—in a way that would bring home his meaning to any literate person of some education and intelligence.

These essays were not quite like anything ever done before. They attracted some admiration during Hazlitt's lifetime, but it was only long after his death that their reputation achieved full stature, increasingly often considered among the best essays ever written in English. Nearly two centuries after they were written, for example, biographer Stanley Jones deemed Hazlitt's Table-Talk and The Plain Speaker together to constitute "the major work of his life", and critic David Bromwich called many of these essays "more observing, original, and keen-witted than any others in the language".

In 1823, Hazlitt also published anonymously Characteristics: In the Manner of Rochefoucault's Maxims, a collection of aphorisms modelled explicitly, as Hazlitt noted in his preface, on the Maximes (1665–1693) of the Duc de La Rochefoucauld. Never quite as cynical as La Rochefoucauld's, many, however, reflect his attitude of disillusionment at this stage of his life. Primarily, these 434 maxims took to an extreme his method of arguing by paradoxes and acute contrasts. For example, maxim "CCCCXXVIII":

There are some persons who never succeed, from being too indolent to undertake anything; and others who regularly fail, because the instant they find success in their power, they grow indifferent, and give over the attempt.

But they also lacked the benefit of Hazlitt's extended reasoning and lucid imagery, and were never included among his greatest works.

==== Recovery and second marriage ====
At the beginning of 1824, though worn out by thwarted passion and the venomous attacks on his character following Liber Amoris, Hazlitt was beginning to recover his equilibrium. Pressed for money as always, he continued to write for various periodicals, including The Edinburgh Review. To The New Monthly Magazine he supplied more essays in the "Table-Talk" manner, and he produced some art criticism, published in that year as Sketches of the Principal Picture Galleries of England.

He also found relief, finally, from the Sarah Walker imbroglio. In 1823, Hazlitt had met Isabella Bridgwater (née Shaw), who married him in March or April 1824, of necessity in Scotland, as Hazlitt's divorce was not recognised in England. Little is known about this Scottish-born widow of the Chief Justice of Grenada, or about her interaction with Hazlitt. She may have been attracted to the idea of marrying a well-known author. For Hazlitt, she offered an escape from loneliness and to an extent from financial worries, as she possessed an independent income of £300 per annum. The arrangement seems to have had a strong element of convenience for both of them. Certainly Hazlitt nowhere in his writings suggests that this marriage was the love match he had been seeking, nor does he mention his new wife at all. In fact, after three and half years, tensions likely resulting from (as Stanley Jones put it) Hazlitt's "improvidence", his son's dislike of her, and neglect of his wife due to his obsessive absorption in preparing an immense biography of Napoleon, resulted in her abrupt departure, and they never lived together again.

For now, in any case, the union afforded the two of them the opportunity to travel. First, they toured parts of Scotland, then, later in 1824, began a European tour lasting over a year.

==== The Spirit of the Age ====
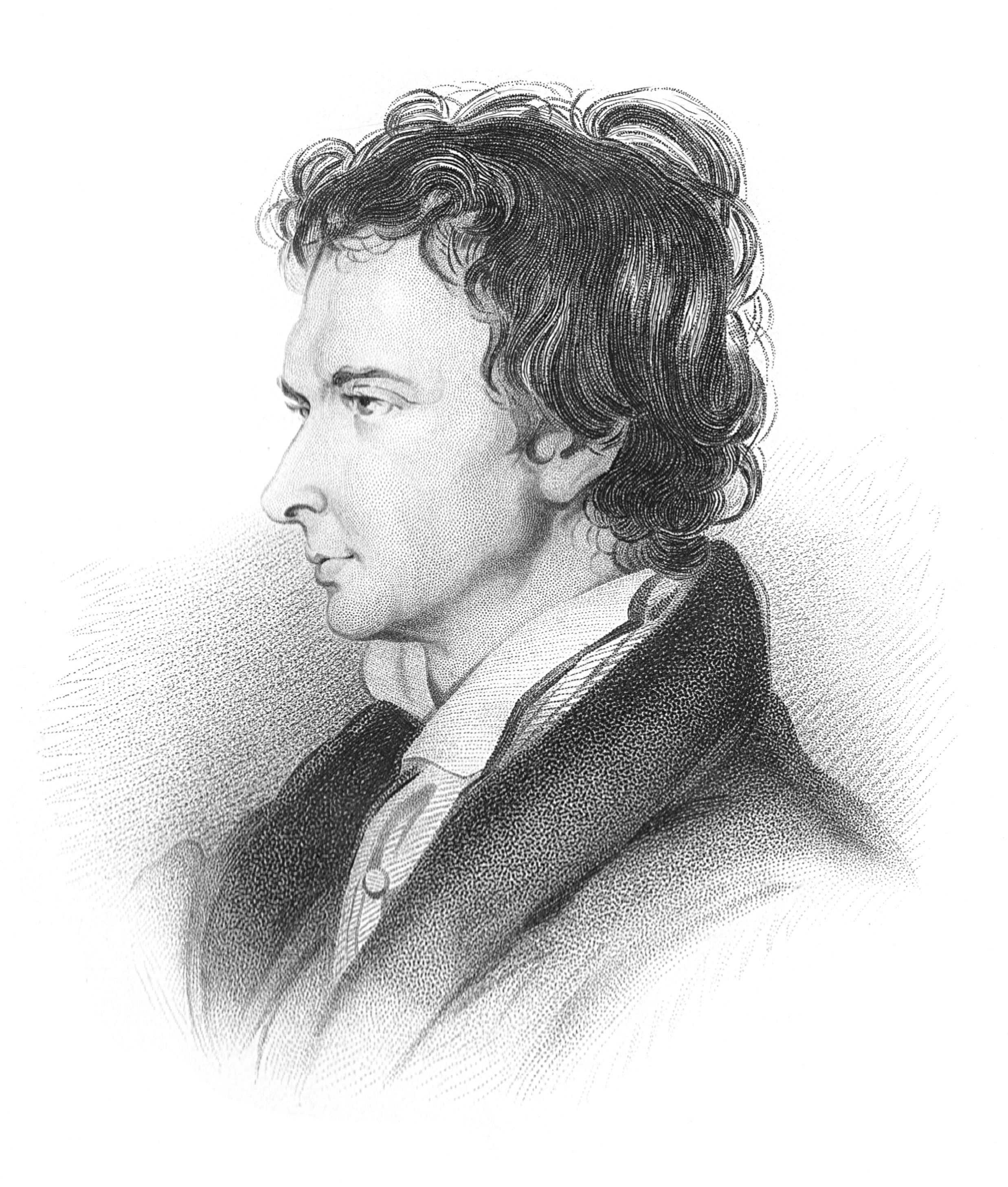
William Hazlitt in 1825 (engraving derived from a chalk sketch by William Bewick)

Before Hazlitt and his new bride set off for the continent, he submitted, among the miscellany of essays that year, one to the New Monthly on "Jeremy Bentham", the first in a series entitled "Spirits of the Age". Several more of the kind followed over the next few months, at least one in The Examiner. Together with some newly written, and one brought in from the "Table-Talk" series, they were collected in book form in 1825 as The Spirit of the Age: Or, Contemporary Portraits.

These sketches of twenty-five men, prominent or otherwise notable as characteristic of the age, came easily to Hazlitt. In his days as a political reporter he had observed many of them at close range. Others he knew personally, and for years their philosophy or poetry had been the subject of his thoughts and lectures.

There were philosophers, social reformers, poets, politicians, and a few who did not fall neatly into any of these categories. Bentham, Godwin, and Malthus, Wordsworth, Coleridge, and Byron were some of the most prominent writers; Wilberforce and Canning were prominent in the political arena; and a few who were hard to classify, such as The Rev. Edward Irving, the preacher, William Gifford, the satirist and critic, and the recently deceased Horne Tooke, a lawyer, politician, grammarian, and wit.

Many of the sketches presented their subjects as seen in daily life. We witness, for example, Bentham "tak[ing] a turn in his garden" with a guest, espousing his plans for "a code of laws 'for some island in the watery waste'", or playing the organ as a relief from incessant musings on vast schemes to improve the lot of mankind. As Bentham's neighbour for some years, Hazlitt had had good opportunity to observe the reformer and philosopher at first hand.

He had already devoted years to pondering much of the thinking espoused by several of these figures. Thoroughly immersed in the Malthusian controversy, for example, Hazlitt had published A Reply to the Essay on Population as early as 1807, and the essay on Malthus is a distillation of Hazlitt's earlier criticisms.

Where he finds it applicable, Hazlitt brings his subjects together in pairs, setting off one against the other, although sometimes his complex comparisons bring out unexpected similarities, as well as differences, between temperaments that otherwise appear to be at opposite poles, as in his reflections on Scott and Byron. So too he points out that, for all the limitations of Godwin's reasoning, as given in that essay, Malthus comes off worse: "Nothing...could be more illogical...than the whole of Mr. Malthus's reasoning applied as an answer...to Mr. Godwin's book". Most distasteful to Hazlitt was the application of "Mr. Malthus's 'gospel'", greatly influential at the time. Many in positions of power had used Malthus's theory to deny the poor relief in the name of the public good, to prevent their propagating the species beyond the means to support it; while on the rich no restraints whatsoever were imposed.

Yet, softening the asperities of his critique, Hazlitt rounds out his sketch by conceding that "Mr. Malthus's style is correct and elegant; his tone of controversy mild and gentlemanly; and the care with which he has brought his facts and documents together, deserves the highest praise".

His portraits of such Tory politicians as Lord Eldon are unrelenting, as might be expected. But elsewhere his characterisations are more balanced, more even-tempered, than similar accounts in past years. Notably, there are portraits of Wordsworth, Coleridge, and Southey, which are, to an extent, essences of his former thoughts about these poets—and those thoughts had been profuse. He had earlier directed some of his most vitriolic attacks against them for having replaced the humanistic and revolutionary ideas of their earlier years with staunch support of the Establishment. Now he goes out of his way to qualify his earlier assessments.

In "Mr. Wordsworth", for example, Hazlitt notes that "it has been said of Mr. Wordsworth, that 'he hates conchology, that he hates the Venus of Medicis.'..." (Hazlitt's own words in an article some years back). Indirectly apologising for his earlier tirade, Hazlitt here brings in a list of writers and artists, like Milton and Poussin, for whom Wordsworth did show appreciation.

Coleridge, whom Hazlitt had once idolised, gets special attention, but, again, with an attempt to moderate earlier criticisms. At an earlier time Hazlitt had dismissed most of Coleridge's prose as "dreary trash". Much of The Friend was "sophistry". The Statesman's Manual was not to be read "with any patience". A Lay Sermon was enough to "make a fool...of any man". For betraying their earlier liberal principles, both Coleridge and Southey were "sworn brothers in the same cause of righteous apostacy".

Now, again, the harshness is softened, and the focus shifts to Coleridge's positive attributes. Coleridge, according to Hazlitt, though one of the most learned and brilliant men of the age, was not necessarily its greatest writer, but he was its "most impressive talker," and he excused Coleridge's "apostacy" by noting that in recent times, when "Genius stopped the way of Legitimacy...it was to be...crushed." Thus, for Hazlitt, Coleridge sought, in the same regrettable but understandable vein as many other leading liberals, to protect himself by siding with the powers that be.

Southey, whose political about-face was more blatant than that of the others, still comes in for a measure of biting criticism: "not truth, but self-opinion is the ruling principle of Mr. Southey's mind". Yet Hazlitt goes out of his way to admire where he can. For example, "Mr. Southey's prose-style can scarcely be too much praised", and "In all the relations and charities of private life, he is correct, exemplary, generous, just".

Hazlitt contrasts Scott and Byron; he skewers his nemesis Gifford; he praises—not without his usual strictures—Jeffrey; and goes on to portray, in one way or another, such notables as Mackintosh, Brougham, Canning, and Wilberforce.

His praise of the poet Thomas Campbell has been cited as one major instance where Hazlitt's critical judgement proved wrong. Hazlitt can scarcely conceal his enthusiasm for such poems as Gertrude of Wyoming, but neither the poems nor Hazlitt's judgement of them have withstood the test of time. His friends Hunt and Lamb get briefer coverage, and—Hazlitt was never one to mince words—they come in for some relatively gentle chiding amid the praise. One American author makes an appearance, Washington Irving, under his pen name of Geoffrey Crayon.

In this manner twenty-five character sketches combine to "form a vivid panorama of the age". Through it all, the author reflects on the Spirit of the Age as a whole, as, for example, "The present is an age of talkers, and not of doers; and the reason is, that the world is growing old. We are so far advanced in the Arts and Sciences, that we live in retrospect, and doat on past achievements".

Some critics have thought the essays in The Spirit of the Age highly uneven in quality and somewhat hastily thrown together, at best "a series of perceptive but disparate and impressionistic sketches of famous contemporaries". It has also been noted, however, that the book is more than a mere portrait gallery. A pattern of ideas ties them together. No thesis is overtly stated, but some thoughts are developed consistently throughout.

Roy Park has noted in particular Hazlitt's critique of excessive abstraction as a major flaw in the period's dominant philosophy and poetry. ("Abstraction", in this case, could be that of religion or mysticism as well as science.) This is the reason, according to Hazlitt, why neither Coleridge, nor Wordsworth, nor Byron could write effective drama. More representative of the finer spirit of the age was poetry that turned inward, focusing on individual perceptions, projections of the poets' sensibilities. The greatest of this type of poetry was Wordsworth's, and that succeeded as far as any contemporary writing could.

Even if it took a century and a half for many of the book's virtues to be realised, enough was recognised at the time to make the book one of Hazlitt's most successful. Unsurprisingly the Tory Blackwood's Magazine lamented that the pillory had fallen into disuse and wondered what "adequate and appropriate punishment there is that we can inflict on this rabid caitiff". But the majority of the reviewers were enthusiastic. For example, the Eclectic Review marvelled at his ability to "hit off a likeness with a few artist-like touches" and The Gentleman's Magazine, with a few reservations, found his style "deeply impregnated with the spirit of the masters of our language, and strengthened by a rich infusion of golden ore...".

==== European tour ====
On 1 September 1824, Hazlitt and his wife began a tour of the European continent, crossing the English Channel by steamboat from Brighton to Dieppe and proceeding from there by coach and sometimes on foot to Paris and Lyon, crossing the Alps in Savoy, then continuing through Italy to Florence and Rome, the most southerly point on their route. Crossing the Apennines, they travelled to Venice, Verona, and Milan, then into Switzerland to Vevey and Geneva. Finally they returned via Germany, the Netherlands, Belgium, and France again, arriving at Dover, England, on 16 October 1825.

There were two extended stops on this excursion: Paris, where the Hazlitts remained for three months; and Vevey, Switzerland, where they rented space in a farmhouse for three months. During those lengthy pauses, Hazlitt accomplished some writing tasks, primarily submitting an account of his trip in several instalments to The Morning Chronicle, which helped to pay for the trip. These articles were later collected and published in book form in 1826 as Notes of a Journey through France and Italy (despite the title, there is also much about the other countries he visited, particularly Switzerland).

This was an escape for a time from all the conflicts, the bitter reactions to his outspoken criticisms, and the attacks on his own publications back in England. And, despite interludes of illness, as well as the miseries of coach travel and the dishonesty of some hotel keepers and coach drivers, Hazlitt managed to enjoy himself. He reacted to his sight of Paris like a child entering a fairyland: "The approach to the capital on the side of St. Germain's is one continued succession of imposing beauty and artificial splendour, of groves, of avenues, of bridges, of palaces, and of towns like palaces, all the way to Paris, where the sight of the Thuilleries completes the triumph of external magnificence...."

He remained with his wife in Paris for more than three months, eagerly exploring the museums, attending the theatres, wandering the streets, and mingling with the people. He was especially glad to be able to return to the Louvre and revisit the masterpieces he had adored twenty years earlier, recording for his readers all of his renewed impressions of canvases by Guido, Poussin, and Titian, among others.

He also was pleased to meet and befriend Henri Beyle, now better known by his nom de plume of Stendhal, who had discovered much to like in Hazlitt's writings, as Hazlitt had in his.

Finally he and his wife resumed the journey to Italy. As they advanced slowly in those days of pre-railway travel (at one stage taking nearly a week to cover less than two hundred miles), Hazlitt registered a running commentary on the scenic points of interest. On the road between Florence and Rome, for example,

Towards the close of the first day's journey ... we had a splendid view of the country we were to travel, which lay stretched out beneath our feet to an immense distance, as we descended into the little town of Pozzo Borgo. Deep valleys sloped on each side of us, from which the smoke of cottages occasionally curled: the branches of an overhanging birch-tree or a neighbouring ruin gave relief to the grey, misty landscape, which was streaked by dark pine-forests, and speckled by the passing clouds; and in the extreme distance rose a range of hills glittering in the evening sun, and scarcely distinguishable from the ridge of clouds that hovered near them.

Hazlitt, in the words of Ralph Wardle, "never stopped observing and comparing. He was an unabashed sightseer who wanted to take in everything available, and he could recreate vividly all he saw".

Yet frequently he showed himself to be more than a mere sightseer, with the painter, critic, and philosopher in him asserting their influence in turn or at once. A splendid scene on the shore of Lake Geneva, for example, viewed with the eye of both painter and art critic, inspired the following observation: "The lake shone like a broad golden mirror, reflecting the thousand dyes of the fleecy purple clouds, while Saint Gingolph, with its clustering habitations, shewed like a dark pitchy spot by its side; and beyond the glimmering verge of the Jura ... hovered gay wreaths of clouds, fair, lovely, visionary, that seemed not of this world....No person can describe the effect; but so in Claude's landscapes the evening clouds drink up the rosy light, and sink into soft repose!"

Likewise, the philosopher in Hazlitt emerges in his account of the following morning: "We had a pleasant walk the next morning along the side of the lake under the grey cliffs, the green hills and azure sky....the snowy ridges that seemed close to us at Vevey receding farther into a kind of lofty background as we advanced.... The speculation of Bishop Berkeley, or some other philosopher, that distance is measured by motion and not by the sight, is verified here at every step".

He was also constantly considering the manners of the people and the differences between the English and the French (and later, to a lesser extent, the Italians and Swiss). Did the French really have a "butterfly, airy, thoughtless, fluttering character"? He was forced to revise his opinions repeatedly. In some ways the French seemed superior to his countrymen. Unlike the English, he discovered, the French attended the theatre reverently, respectfully, "the attention ... like that of a learned society to a lecture on some scientific subject". And he found culture more widespread among the working classes: "You see an apple-girl in Paris, sitting at a stall with her feet over a stove in the coldest weather, or defended from the sun by an umbrella, reading Racine and Voltaire".

Trying to be honest with himself, and every day discovering something new about French manners that confounded his preconceptions, Hazlitt was soon compelled to retract some of his old prejudices. "In judging of nations, it will not do to deal in mere abstractions", he concluded. "In countries, as well as individuals, there is a mixture of good and bad qualities; yet we attempt to strike a general balance, and compare the rules with the exceptions".

As he had befriended Stendhal in Paris, so in Florence, besides visiting the picture galleries, he struck up a friendship with Walter Savage Landor. He also spent much time with his old friend Leigh Hunt, now in residence there.

Hazlitt was ambivalent about Rome, the farthest point of his journey. His first impression was one of disappointment. He had expected primarily the monuments of antiquity. But, he asked, "what has a green-grocer's stall, a stupid English china warehouse, a putrid trattoria, a barber's sign, an old clothes or old picture shop or a Gothic palace ... to do with ancient Rome?" Further, "the picture galleries at Rome disappointed me quite". Eventually he found plenty to admire, but the accumulation of monuments of art in one place was almost too much for him, and there were also too many distractions. There were the "pride, pomp, and pageantry" of the Catholic religion, as well as having to cope with the "inconvenience of a stranger's residence at Rome....You want some shelter from the insolence and indifference of the inhabitants....You have to squabble with every one about you to prevent being cheated, to drive a hard bargain in order to live, to keep your hands and your tongue within strict bounds, for fear of being stilettoed, or thrown into the Tower of St. Angelo, or remanded home. You have much to do to avoid the contempt of the inhabitants....You must run the gauntlet of sarcastic words or looks for a whole street, of laughter or want of comprehension in reply to all the questions you ask....

Venice presented fewer difficulties, and was a scene of special fascination for him: "You see Venice rising from the sea", he wrote, "its long line of spires, towers, churches, wharfs ... stretched along the water's edge, and you view it with a mixture of awe and incredulity". The palaces were incomparable: "I never saw palaces anywhere but at Venice". Of equal or even greater importance to him were the paintings. Here there were numerous masterpieces by his favourite painter Titian, whose studio he visited, as well as others by Veronese, Giorgione, Tintoretto, and more.

On the way home, crossing the Swiss Alps, Hazlitt particularly desired to see the town of Vevey, the scene of Rousseau's 1761 novel La Nouvelle Héloïse, a love story that he associated with his disappointed love for Sarah Walker. He was so enchanted with the region even apart from its personal and literary associations that he remained there with his wife for three months, renting a floor of a farmhouse named "Gelamont" outside of town, where "every thing was perfectly clean and commodious". The place was for the most part an oasis of tranquility for Hazlitt. As he reported:

Days, weeks, months, and even years might have passed on much in the same manner.... We breakfasted at the same hour, and the tea-kettle was always boiling...; a lounge in the orchard for an hour or two, and twice a week we could see the steam-boat creeping like a spider over the surface of the lake; a volume of the Scotch novels..., or M. Galignani's Paris and London Observer, amused us till dinner time; then tea and a walk till the moon unveiled itself, "apparent queen of the night," or the brook, swoln with a transient shower, was heard more distinctly in the darkness, mingling with the soft, rustling breeze; and the next morning the song of peasants broke upon refreshing sleep, as the sun glanced among the clustering vine-leaves, or the shadowy hills, as the mists retired from their summits, looked in at our windows.

Hazlitt's time at Vevey was not passed entirely in a waking dream. As at Paris, and sometimes other stopping points such as Florence, he continued to write, producing one or two essays later included in The Plain Speaker, as well as some miscellaneous pieces. A side trip to Geneva during this period led him to a review of his Spirit of the Age, by Francis Jeffrey, in which the latter takes him to task for striving too hard after originality. As much as Hazlitt respected Jeffrey, this hurt (perhaps the more because of his respect), and Hazlitt, to work off his angry feelings, dashed off the only verse from his pen that has ever come to light, "The Damned Author's Address to His Reviewers", published anonymously on 18 September 1825, in the London and Paris Observer, and ending with the bitterly sardonic lines, "And last, to make my measure full,/Teach me, great J[effre]y, to be dull!"

Much of his time, however, was spent in a mellow mood. At this time he wrote "Merry England" (which appeared in the December 1825 New Monthly Magazine). "As I write this", he wrote, "I am sitting in the open air in a beautiful valley.... Intent upon the scene and upon the thoughts that stir within me, I conjure up the cheerful passages of my life, and a crowd of happy images appear before me".

The return to London in October was a letdown. The grey skies and bad food compared unfavorably with his recent retreat, and he was suffering from digestive problems (these recurred throughout much of his later life), though it was also good to be home. But he already had plans to return to Paris.

=== Return to London, trip to Paris, and last years (1825–1830) ===
==== "The old age of artists" ====
As comfortable as Hazlitt was on settling in again to his home on Down Street in London in late 1825 (where he remained until about mid-1827), the reality of earning a living again stared him in the face. He continued to provide a stream of contributions to various periodicals, primarily The New Monthly Magazine. The topics continued to be his favourites, including critiques of the "new school of reformers", drama criticism, and reflections on manners and the tendencies of the human mind. He gathered previously published essays for the collection The Plain Speaker, writing a few new ones in the process. He also oversaw the publication in book form of his account of his recent Continental tour.

But what he most wanted was to write a biography of Napoleon. Now Sir Walter Scott was writing his own life of Napoleon, from a strictly conservative point of view, and Hazlitt wanted to produce one from a countervailing, liberal perspective. Really, his stance on Napoleon was his own, as he had idolised Napoleon for decades, and he prepared to return to Paris to undertake the research. First, however, he brought to fruition another favourite idea.

Always fascinated by artists in their old age (see "On the Old Age of Artists"), Hazlitt was especially interested in the painter James Northcote, student and later biographer of Sir Joshua Reynolds, and a Royal Academician. Hazlitt would frequently visit him—by then about 80 years old—and they conversed endlessly on men and manners, the illustrious figures of Northcote's younger days, particularly Reynolds, and the arts, particularly painting.

Northcote was at this time a crochety, slovenly old man who lived in wretched surroundings and was known for his misanthropic personality. Hazlitt was oblivious to the surroundings and tolerated the grumpiness. Finding congeniality in Northcote's company, and feeling many of their views to be in alignment, he transcribed their conversations from memory and published them in a series of articles entitled "Boswell Redivivus" in The New Monthly Magazine. (They were later collected under the title Conversations of James Northcote, Esq., R.A.) But there was little in common between these articles and Boswell's life of Johnson. Hazlitt felt such a closeness to the old artist that in his conversations, Northcote was transformed into a kind of alter ego. Hazlitt made no secret of the fact that the words he ascribed to Northcote were not all Northcote's own but sometimes expressed the views of Hazlitt as much as Hazlitt's own words.

Some of the conversations were little more than gossip, and they spoke of their contemporaries without restraint. When the conversations were published, some of those contemporaries were outraged. Northcote denied the words were his; and Hazlitt was shielded from the consequences to a degree by his residing in Paris, where he was at work on what he thought would be his masterpiece.

The last conversation (originally published in The Atlas on 15 November 1829, when Hazlitt had less than a year to live) is especially telling. Whether it really occurred more or less as given, or was a construct of Hazlitt's own imagination, it provides perspective on Hazlitt's own position in life at that time.

In words attributed to Northcote: "You have two faults: one is a feud or quarrel with the world, which makes you despair, and prevents you taking all the pains you might; the other is a carelessness and mismanagement, which makes you throw away the little you actually do, and brings you into difficulties that way."

Hazlitt justifies his own contrary attitude at length: "When one is found fault with for nothing, or for doing one's best, one is apt to give the world their revenge. All the former part of my life I was treated as a cipher; and since I have got into notice, I have been set upon as a wild beast. When this is the case, and you can expect as little justice as candour, you naturally in self-defence take refuge in a sort of misanthropy and cynical contempt for mankind."

And yet on reflection, Hazlitt felt that his life was not so bad after all:

The man of business and fortune ... is up and in the city by eight, swallows his breakfast in haste, attends a meeting of creditors, must read Lloyd's lists, consult the price of consols, study the markets, look into his accounts, pay his workmen, and superintend his clerks: he has hardly a minute in the day to himself, and perhaps in the four-and-twenty hours does not do a single thing that he would do if he could help it. Surely, this sacrifice of time and inclination requires some compensation, which it meets with. But how am I entitled to make my fortune (which cannot be done without all this anxiety and drudgery) who do hardly any thing at all, and never any thing but what I like to do? I rise when I please, breakfast at length, write what comes into my head, and after taking a mutton-chop and a dish of strong tea, go to the play, and thus my time passes.

He was perhaps overly self-disparaging in this self-portrait, but it opens a window on the kind of life Hazlitt was leading at this time, and how he evaluated it in contrast to the lives of his more overtly successful contemporaries.

==== Hero worship ====
In August 1826, Hazlitt and his wife set out for Paris again, so he could research what he hoped would be his masterpiece, a biography of Napoleon, seeking "to counteract the prejudiced interpretations of Scott's biography". Hazlitt "had long been convinced that Napoleon was the greatest man of his era, the apostle of freedom, a born leader of men in the old heroic mould: he had thrilled to his triumphs over 'legitimacy' and suffered real anguish at his downfall".

This did not work out quite as planned. His wife's independent income allowed them to take lodgings in a fashionable part of Paris; he was comfortable, but also distracted by visitors and far from the libraries he needed to visit. Nor did he have access to all the materials that Scott's stature and connections had provided him with for his own life of Napoleon. Hazlitt's son also came to visit, and conflicts broke out between him and his father that also drove a wedge between Hazlitt and his second wife: their marriage was by now in free fall.

With his own works failing to sell, Hazlitt had to spend much time churning out more articles to cover expenses. Yet distractions notwithstanding, some of these essays rank among his finest, for example his "On the Feeling of Immortality in Youth", published in The Monthly Magazine (not to be confused with the similarly named New Monthly Magazine) in March 1827. The essay "On a Sun-Dial", which appeared late in 1827, may have been written during a second tour to Italy with his wife and son.

On returning to London with his son in August 1827, Hazlitt was shocked to discover that his wife, still in Paris, was leaving him. He settled in modest lodgings on Half-Moon Street, and thereafter waged an unending battle against poverty, as he found himself forced to grind out a stream of mostly undistinguished articles for weeklies like The Atlas to generate desperately needed cash. Relatively little is known of Hazlitt's other activities in this period. He spent as much time, apparently, at Winterslow as he did in London. Some meditative essays emerged from this stay in his favourite country retreat, and he also made progress with his life of Napoleon. But he also found himself struggling against bouts of illness, nearly dying at Winterslow in December 1827. Two volumes—the first half—of the Napoleon biography appeared in 1828, only to have its publisher fail soon thereafter. This entailed even more financial difficulties for the author, and what little evidence we have of his activities at the time consists in large part of begging letters to publishers for advances of money.

The easy life he had spoken of to Northcote had largely vanished by the time that conversation was published about a year before his death. By then he was overwhelmed by the degradation of poverty, frequent bouts of physical as well as mental illness—depression—caused by his failure to find true love and by his inability to bring to fruition his defence of the man he worshipped as a hero of liberty and fighter of despotism.

Although Hazlitt retained a few devoted admirers, his reputation among the general public had been demolished by the cadre of reviewers in Tory periodicals whose efforts Hazlitt had excoriated in "On the Jealousy and the Spleen of Party". According to John Wilson of Blackwood's Magazine, for example, Hazlitt had already "been excommunicated from all decent society, and nobody would touch a dead book of his, any more than they would the body of a man who had died of the plague".

His four-volume life of Napoleon turned out to be a financial failure. Worse in retrospect, it was a poorly integrated hodgepodge of largely borrowed materials. Less than a fifth of his projected masterpiece consists of Hazlitt's own words. Here and there, a few inspired passages stand out, such as the following:

I have nowhere in any thing I may have written declared myself to be a Republican; nor should I think it worth while to be a martyr and a confessor to any form or mode of government. But what I have staked health and wealth, name and fame upon, and am ready to do so again and to the last gasp, is this, that there is a power in the people to change its government and its governors.

Hazlitt managed to complete The Life of Napoleon Buonaparte shortly before his death, but did not live to see it published in its entirety.

==== Last years ====
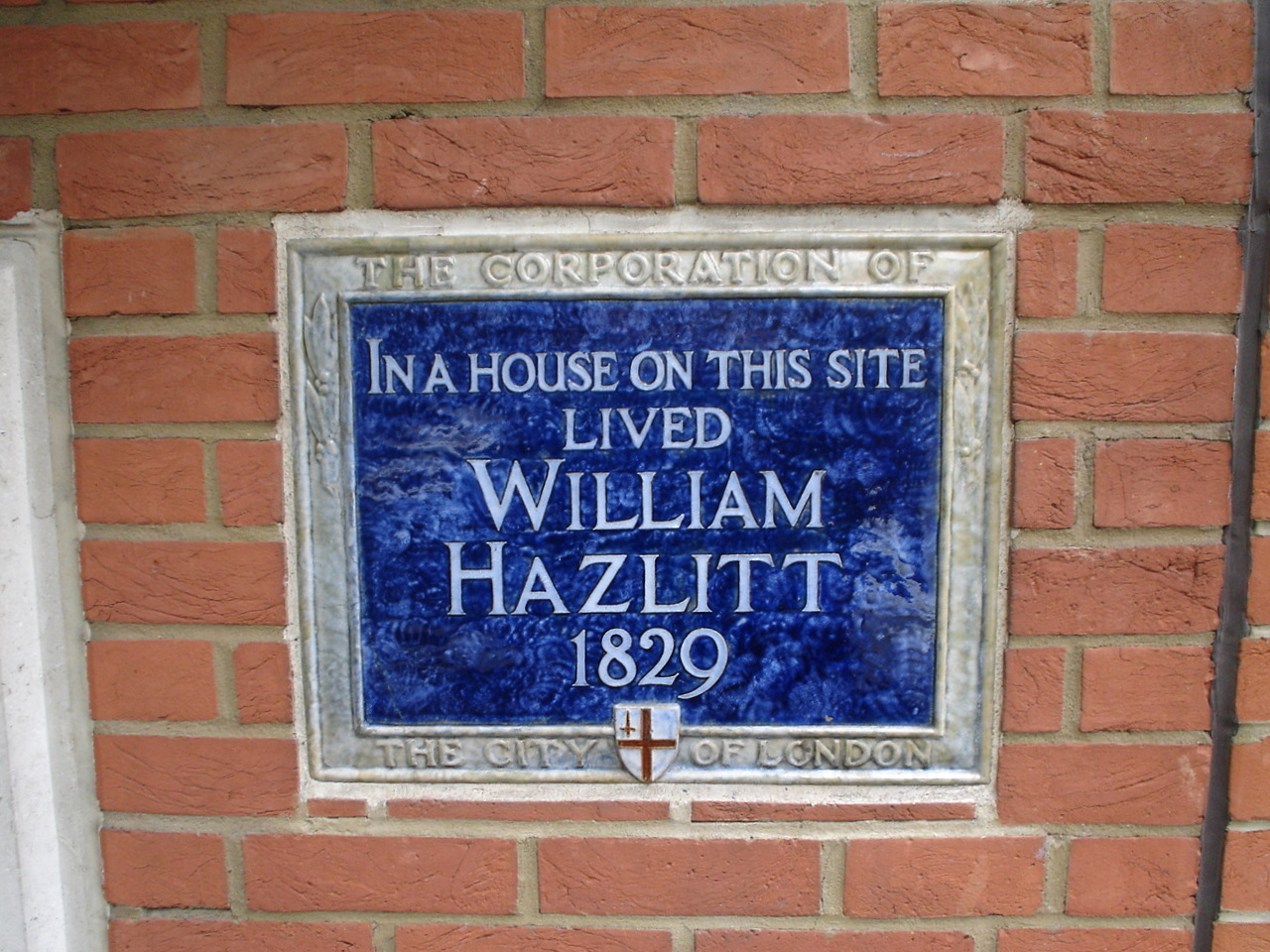
Plaque in Bouverie Street, London, marking the site of William Hazlitt's house

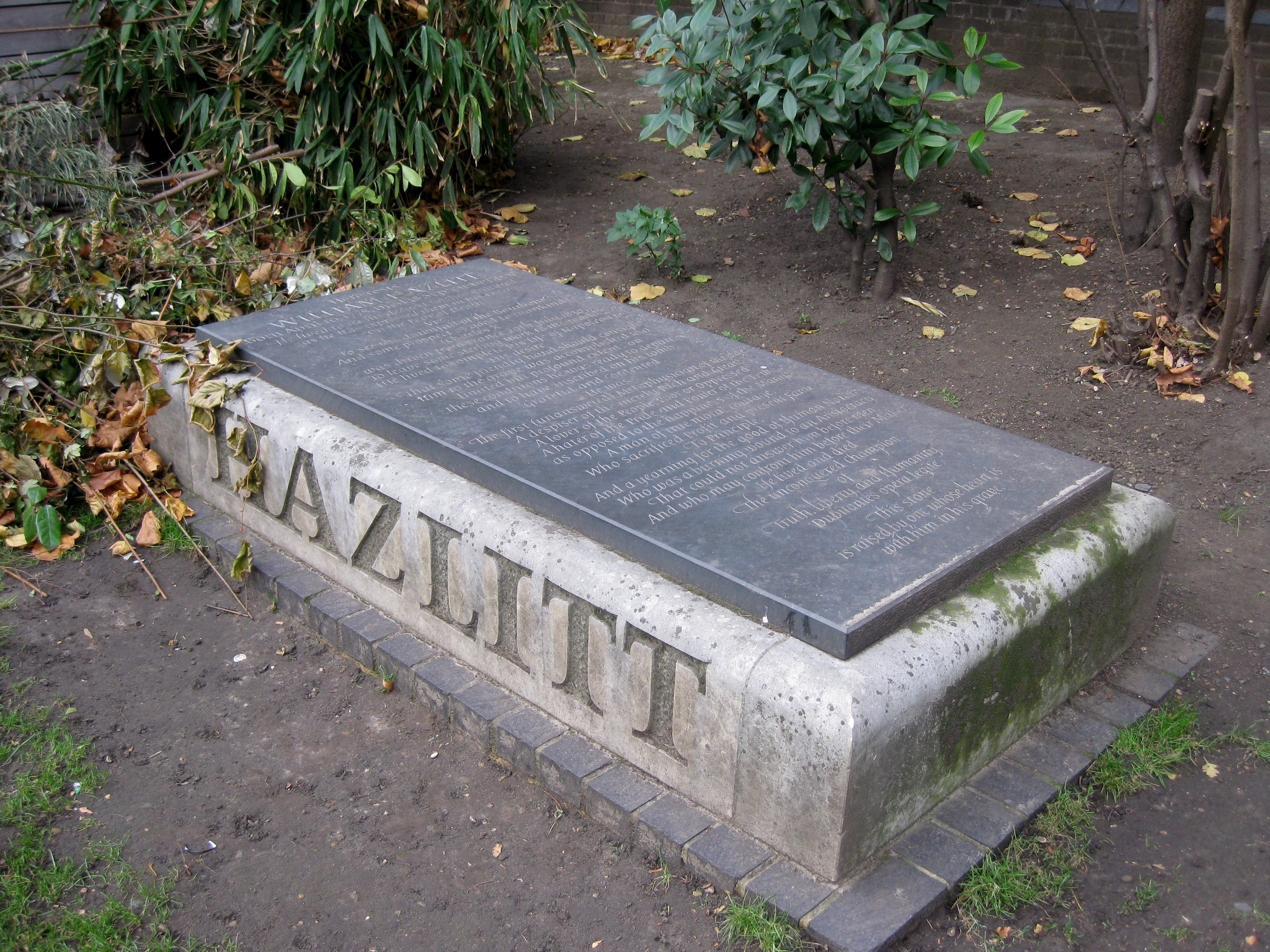
The site of Hazlitt's grave in the churchyard of St Anne's, Soho, with a new memorial commissioned following a campaign led by Tom Paulin

Few details remain of Hazlitt's daily life in his last years. Much of his time was spent by choice in the bucolic setting of Winterslow, but he needed to be in London for business reasons. There, he seems to have exchanged visits with some of his old friends, but few details of these occasions were recorded. Often he was seen in the company of his son and son's fiancée. Otherwise, he continued to produce a stream of articles to make ends meet.

In 1828, Hazlitt found work reviewing for the theatre again (for The Examiner). In playgoing he found one of his greatest consolations. One of his most notable essays, "The Free Admission", arose from this experience. As he explained there, attending the theatre was not merely a great solace in itself; the atmosphere was conducive to contemplating the past, not just memories of the plays themselves or his reviewing of past performances, but the course of his whole life. In words written within his last few months, the possessor of a free admission to the theatre, "ensconced in his favourite niche, looking from the 'loop-holes of retreat' in the second circle ... views the pageant of the world played before him; melts down years to moments; sees human life, like a gaudy shadow, glance across the stage; and here tastes of all earth's bliss, the sweet without the bitter, the honey without the sting, and plucks ambrosial fruits and amaranthine flowers (placed by the enchantress Fancy within his reach,) without having to pay a tax for it at the time, or repenting of it afterwards."

He found some time to return to his earlier philosophical pursuits, including popularised presentations of the thoughts expressed in earlier writings. Some of these, such as meditations on "Common Sense", "Originality", "The Ideal", "Envy", and "Prejudice", appeared in The Atlas in early 1830. At some point in this period he summarised the spirit and method of his life's work as a philosopher, which he had never ceased to consider himself to be; but "The Spirit of Philosophy" was not published in his lifetime. He also began contributing once again to The Edinburgh Review; paying better than the other journals, it helped stave off hunger.

After a brief stay on Bouverie Street in 1829, sharing lodgings with his son, Hazlitt moved into a small apartment at 6 Frith Street, Soho. He continued to turn out articles for The Atlas, The London Weekly Review, and now The Court Journal. Plagued more frequently by painful bouts of illness, he began to retreat within himself. Even at this time, however, he turned out a few notable essays, primarily for The New Monthly Magazine. Turning his suffering to advantage, he described the experience, with copious observations on the effects of illness and recovery on the mind, in "The Sick Chamber". In one of his last respites from pain, reflecting on his personal history, he wrote, "This is the time for reading. ... A cricket chirps on the hearth, and we are reminded of Christmas gambols long ago. ... A rose smells doubly sweet ... and we enjoy the idea of a journey and an inn the more for having been bed-rid. But a book is the secret and sure charm to bring all these implied associations to a focus. ... If the stage [alluding to his remarks in "The Free-Admission"] shows us the masks of men and the pageant of the world, books let us into their souls and lay open to us the secrets of our own. They are the first and last, the most home-felt, the most heart-felt of our enjoyments". At this time he was reading the novels of Edward Bulwer in hopes of reviewing them for The Edinburgh Review.

Such respites from pain did not last, though news of The Three Glorious Days that drove the Bourbons from France in July raised his spirits. A few visitors cheered these days, but, toward the end, he was frequently too sick to see any of them. By September 1830, Hazlitt was confined to his bed, with his son in attendance, his pain so acute that his doctor kept him drugged on opium much of the time. His last few days were spent in delirium, obsessed with some woman, which in later years gave rise to speculation: was it Sarah Walker? Or was it, as biographer Stanley Jones believes, more likely to have been a woman he had met more recently at the theatre? Finally, with his son and a few others in attendance, he died on 18 September. His last words were reported to have been "Well, I've had a happy life".

Hazlitt was buried in the churchyard of St Anne's Church, Soho in London on 23 September 1830, with only his son William, Charles Lamb, P. G. Patmore, and possibly a few other friends in attendance.

== Posthumous reputation ==
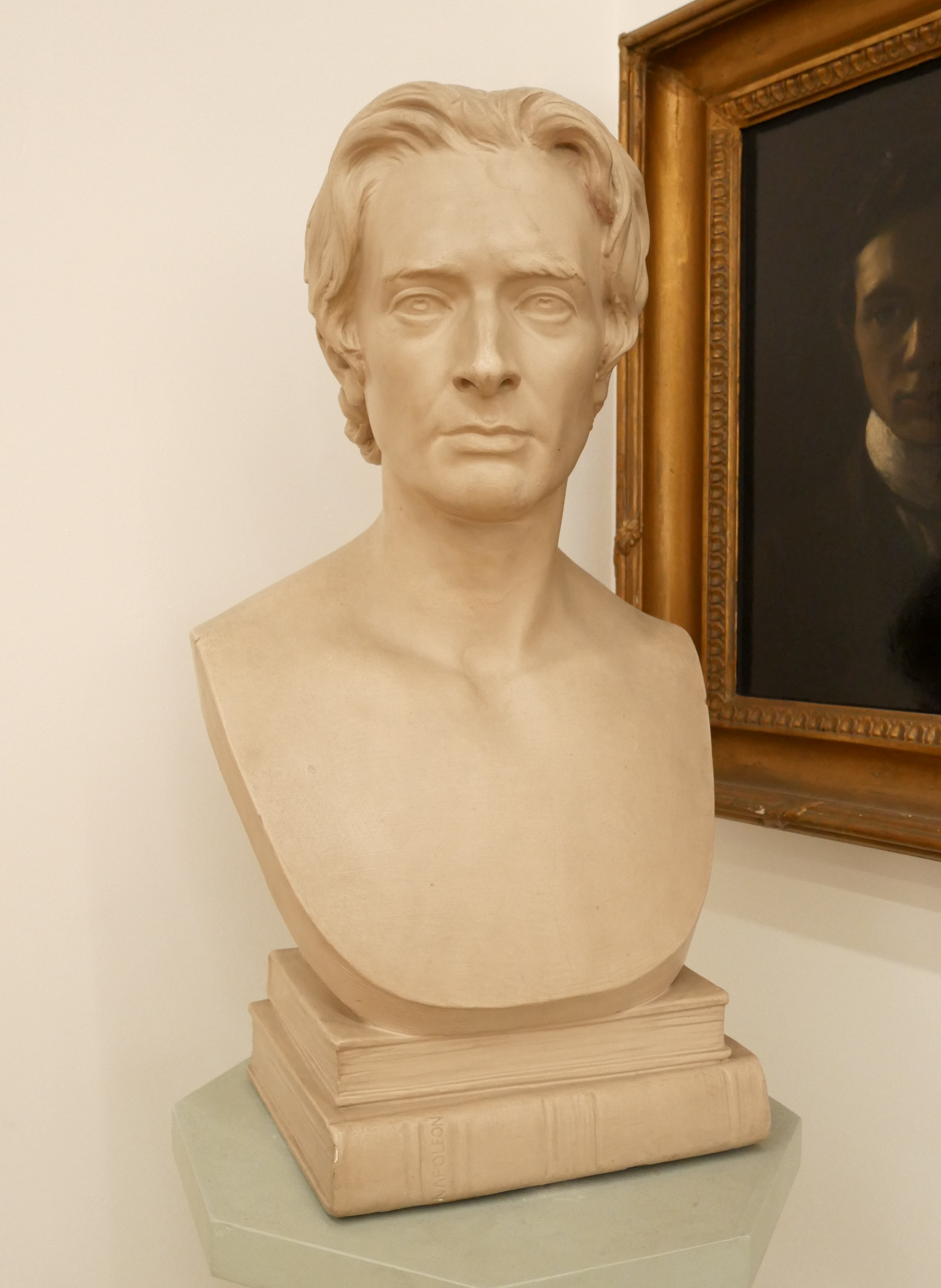
Bust of Hazlitt in Maidstone Museum

His works having fallen out of print, Hazlitt's reputation declined. In the late 1990s his reputation was reasserted by admirers and his works reprinted. Two major works by others then appeared: The Day-Star of Liberty: William Hazlitt's Radical Style by Tom Paulin in 1998 and Quarrel of the Age: The Life and Times of William Hazlitt by A. C. Grayling in 2000. Hazlitt's reputation has continued to rise, and now many contemporary thinkers, poets, and scholars consider him one of the greatest critics in the English language, and its finest essayist.

In 2003, following a lengthy appeal initiated by Ian Mayes together with A. C. Grayling, Hazlitt's gravestone was restored in St Anne's Churchyard, and unveiled by Michael Foot. A Hazlitt Society was then inaugurated. The society publishes an annual peer-reviewed journal called The Hazlitt Review.

The last place Hazlitt lived in, on Frith Street in London, is now a hotel, Hazlitt's.

The Jonathan Bate novel The Cure for Love (1998) was based indirectly on Hazlitt's life.

== Bibliography ==
=== Selected works ===
- An Essay on the Principles of Human Action (1805) – Internet Archive
- Free Thoughts on Public Affairs (1806) – Google Books
- A Reply to the Essay on Population, by the Rev. T. R. Malthus (1807) – Internet Archive
- The Round Table: A Collection of Essays on Literature, Men, and Manners (with Leigh Hunt; 1817) – Google Books
- Characters of Shakespear's Plays (1817) – Wikisource.
- Lectures on the English Poets (1818) – Google Books
- A View of the English Stage (1818) – Google Books
- Lectures on the English Comic Writers (1819) – Internet Archive
- Political Essays, with Sketches of Public Characters (1819) – Wikisource.
- Lectures Chiefly on the Dramatic Literature of the Age of Elizabeth (1820) – Internet Archive
- Table-Talk (1821–22; "Paris" edition, with somewhat different contents, 1825) – Wikisource.
- Characteristics: In the Manner of Rochefoucault's Maxims (1822) – Google Books
- Liber Amoris: or, The New Pygmalion (1823) – Google Books
- The Spirit of the Age (1825) – Wikisource.
- The Plain Speaker: Opinions on Books, Men, and Things (1826) – Volume I and Volume II on Google Books
- Notes of a Journey Through France and Italy (1826) – Internet Archive
- The Life of Napoleon Buonaparte (four volumes; 1828–1830)

=== Selected posthumous collections ===
- Literary Remains. Edited by William Carew Hazlitt. London: Saunders and Otley, 1836 – Internet Archive
- Sketches and Essays. Edited by William Carew Hazlitt. London, 1839 – Internet Archive
- Criticisms on Art. Edited by William Carew Hazlitt. London: C. Templeman, 1844 – Internet Archive
- Winterslow: Essays and Characters. Edited by William Carew Hazlitt. London: David Bogue, 1850 – Internet Archive
- The Collected Works of William Hazlitt. 13 vols. Edited by A. R. Waller and Arnold Glover, with an introduction by W. E. Glover. London: J. M. Dent, 1902–1906 – Internet Archive
- Selected Essays. Edited by George Sampson. Cambridge: at the University Press, 1917 – Internet Archive
- New Writings by William Hazlitt. Edited by P. P. Howe. London: Martin Secker, 1925 – HathiTrust
- New Writings by William Hazlitt: Second Series. Edited by P. P. Howe. London: Martin Secker, 1927 – HathiTrust
- Selected Essays of William Hazlitt, 1778–1830. Centenary ed. Edited by Geoffrey Keynes. London: Nonesuch Press, 1930, OCLC 250868603.
- The Complete Works of William Hazlitt. Centenary ed. 21 vols. Edited by P. P. Howe, after the edition of A. R. Waller and Arnold Glover. London: J. M. Dent, 1931–1934, OCLC 1913989.
- The Hazlitt Sampler: Selections from his Familiar, Literary, and Critical Essays. Edited by Herschel Moreland Sikes. Greenwich, Conn.: Fawcett Publications, 1961, ASIN B0007DMF94.
- Selected Writings. Edited by Ronald Blythe. Harmondsworth: Penguin Books, 1970 [reissued 2009], ISBN 9780199552528.
- The Letters of William Hazlitt. Edited by Herschel Moreland Sikes, assisted by Willard Hallam Bonner and Gerald Lahey. London: Macmillan, 1979, ISBN 9780814749869.
- Selected Writings. Edited by Jon Cook. Oxford: Oxford University Press, 1991, ISBN 9780199552528.
- The Selected Writings of William Hazlitt. 9 vols. Edited by Duncan Wu. London: Pickering and Chatto, 1998, ISBN 9781851963690 – WorldCat.
- The Fight, and Other Writings. Edited by Tom Paulin and David Chandler. London: Penguin Books, 2000, ISBN 9780140436136.
- Metropolitan Writings. Edited by Gregory Dart. Manchester: Fyfield Books, 2005, ISBN 9781857547580.
- New Writings of William Hazlitt. 2 vols. Edited by Duncan Wu. Oxford: Oxford University Press, 2007, ISBN 9780199207060.
- The Spirit of Controversy and Other Essays. Edited by Jon Mee and James Grande. Oxford: Oxford University Press, 2021.

Other editors of Hazlitt include Frank Carr (1889), D. Nichol Smith (1901), Jacob Zeitlin (1913), Will David Howe (1913), Arthur Beatty (1919?), Charles Calvert (1925?), A. J. Wyatt (1925), Charles Harold Gray (1926), G. E. Hollingworth (1926), Stanley Williams (1937?), R. W. Jepson (1940), Richard Wilson (1942), Catherine Macdonald Maclean (1949), William Archer and Robert Lowe (1958), John R. Nabholtz (1970), Christopher Salvesen (1972), and R. S. White (1996).

== See also ==
- Napoleonist syndrome
