= William Carew Hazlitt =

English lawyer, bibliographer, editor and writer

- Born: 22 August 1834
- Died: 8 September 1913 (aged 79)
- Education: Merchant Taylors' School
- Occupations: Lawyer, Bibliographer; Editor; Writer
- Parent: William Hazlitt
- Relatives: William Hazlitt (grandfather)

William Carew Hazlitt (22 August 1834 – 8 September 1913), known professionally as W. Carew Hazlitt, was an English lawyer, bibliographer, editor and writer. He was the son of the barrister and registrar William Hazlitt, a grandson of the essayist and critic William Hazlitt, and a great-grandson of the Unitarian minister and author William Hazlitt. William Carew Hazlitt was educated at the Merchant Taylors' School and was called to the bar of the Inner Temple in 1861.

== Works ==
Among Hazlitt's many publications are Handbook to the Popular, Poetical and Dramatic Literature of Great Britain: From the Invention of Printing to the Restoration (1867). Hazlitt published further contributions to the subject in Bibliographical Collections and Notes on Early English Literature, Made During the Years 1893–1903 (1903), and a Manual for the Collector and Amateur of Old English Plays ... (1892). He was also the chief editor of an edition of Warton's History of English Poetry (1871) and compiled the Catalogue of the Huth Library (1880).

He edited A Select Collection of Old English Plays, 4th edition (London: Reeves and Turner, 1874–76), which had been originally published by Dodsley in 1744.

He also published Collections and Notes, 1867-1876 (London: Reeves & Turner, 1876, containing detailed bibliographical entries on many early English printed books) followed by Bibliographical Collections and Notes on Early English Literature 1474-1700: Second Supplement (1882).

In 1897 Hazlitt published his autobiography under the title The Confessions of a Collector.

In 1875, he published an edition of the works of Thomas Randolph. In 1877 he published a new edition of Charles Cotton's translation of Montaigne's Essays.

He also published The History of the Venetian Republic: Her Rise, Her Greatness, and Her Civilization (1860) and Old Cookery Books and Ancient Cuisine (1886).

Of great use and historical interest to gardeners and collectors of herbals, etc., is his Gleanings in Old Garden Literature, published by Elliot Stock, London, 1887, in The Book-Lover's Library. This book includes, in its final chapter, a Bibliography of Gardening Literature, 1603–1800, and of Herbals and Bee Culture. The book focuses on European gardening and British adoptions and modifications thereof from the 15th through the 17th century.

Compendious in scope and idiosyncratic in selection is his A Dictionary of Faiths and Folk Lore. Reeves & Turner. 1905. OCLC 647632425., which preserves evidence of numerous folk customs now extinct.
