= William Hazlitt (registrar) =

English lawyer, author, and translator

William Hazlitt (26 September 1811 – 23 February 1893) was an English lawyer, author, and translator, best known for his Classical Gazetteer and for overseeing the posthumous publication and republication of many of the works of his father, the critic William Hazlitt.

The younger Hazlitt stayed on good terms with both parents despite their separation. As a young man, he began to write for the Morning Chronicle, and in 1833 he married Catherine Reynell. In 1844 he was called to the bar at the Middle Temple, and for more than thirty years he held the position of Registrar in the Court of Bankruptcy, from which he retired two years before his death in Addlestone, Surrey.

Besides the Classical Gazetteer, he wrote legal works such as The Registration of Deeds in England, its Past Progress and Present Position (1851) and A Manual of the Law of Maritime Warfare (1854), and produced many translations, including Victor Hugo's Notre-Dame: A Tale of the Ancien Régime (1833), Michelet's History of the Roman Republic (1847), Table Talk or Familiar Discourse of Martin Luther (1848), Travels in Tartary, Thibet, and China, During the Years 1844-5-6 by Évariste Régis Huc (1852), Louis XVII: His Life—His Suffering—His Death: The Captivity of the Royal Family in the Temple, by A. de Beauchesne (1853), Guizot's General History of Civilization in Europe, from the Fall of the Roman Empire to the French Revolution (1857), and the Works of Michael de Montaigne (1859).

His son, William Carew Hazlitt, also became a well-known writer.
